= List of San Diego International Film Festival award winners =

The San Diego International Film Festival is an independent film festival held annually in San Diego. The festival's top honorary award is the Gregory Peck Award for Cinematic Excellence that has been presented at the festival by the family of Gregory Peck since 2014. The festival also presents the Chris Brinker Award to first time directors. Those and other honorary and competitive awards presented by and at the festival are here organized by year and by award.

== Film Competition Award Winners By Year ==
=== SDiFF2025 ===
Oct 15-20, 2025

- Best Feature: Aontas, Ireland
- Artistic Director’s Award: Matter of Time
- Best Gala Fil: Hamnet
- Best Documentary: Standout: The Ben Kjar Story
- Best International Feature: Hello Mother, Mongolia
- Best Ensemble: Fantasy Life
- Best Comedy: For Worse
- Best Women Film Series: The Fisherman, Ghana
- Best Short Documentary: The Opening Address
- Best Short Narrative: Sally, Get the Potatoes
- Best International Short Film: Kong Kong
- Best Animation: Forevergreen
- Best Student Film: Echoes of the Wild

Audience Choice Awards:

- Feature: Obraz, Montenegro.
- Documentary: Standout: The Ben Kjar Story and A Quiet Love
- Short: Rise
- Gala Award: Hamnet

=== SDiFF2024 ===
Oct 16-20, 2024

- Artistic Director's Award: Drive Back Home
- Best Gala Film: Conclave
- Best Feature Film: Bob Trevino Likes It
- Best Documentary: Moses 13 Steps
- Breakthrough International: Mariana's Trench
- Best International Feature: Stranger's Case
- Best Drama Feature: The Uninvited
- Best Women's Film Series: We Are Dangerous
- Best Short Doc: Hello Stranger
- Best Short Narrative: The Last Ranger
- Best Shorts Track: Heartstrings
- Best International Short Film: Il Taglio Di Jonas
- Best Animation: Luki and the Lights
- Kumeyaay Award: Bring Them Home
- Best Student Film: Xander

Audience Choice Awards:

- Audience Choice Feature: Evergreen$
- Audience Choice Documentary: Bring Them Home
- Audience Choice Short: Buscando Alma
- Audience Choice Gala: September 5

=== SDiFF2023 ===
Oct 18-22, 2023

- Artistic Director's Award: Fresh Kills
- Best Gala Film: American Fiction
- Best Feature Film: Blood For Dust
- Best Documentary: The Grab
- Breakthrough Documentary: Hidden Masters
- Best International Feature: Ariel: Back to Buenos Aires
- Best Drama Feature: Junction
- Best Comedy Feature: A Kind of Kidnapping
- Best Women's Film Series: Miranda's Victim
- Best Short Doc: Squid Fleet
- Best Short Narrative: Things Unheard Of
- Best Shorts Track: Global Consciousness Track
- Best International Short Film: Lambing
- Best Animation: American Sikh
- Kumeyaay Award: Before The Sun
- Best Student Film: The External-Internal Monologue of an Interdependent Insomniac
- Best Military: Brothers After War

Audience Choice Awards:

- Audience Choice Feature: Three Storey Comedy
- Audience Choice Documentary: Brothers After War
- Audience Choice Short: Desi Standard Time Travel
- Audience Choice Gala: The Holdovers

=== SDiFF2022 ===
Oct 19-23, 2022

- Artistic Director's Award: American Murderer (dir. Matthew Gentile)
- Best Gala Film: The Banshees of Inisherin
- Best Feature Film: Freedom's Path
- Best Documentary: With This Breath I Fly
- Best International Feature: The Woman In the White Car
- Best Drama Feature: What We Do Next
- Best Comedy Feature: Róise & Frank
- Best Women's Film Series: The Moon & Back
- Best Ensemble Cast: Bleecker
- Best Short Doc: For the Bees
- Best Short Narrative: Shower Boys
- Best International Short Film: The Red Suitcase
- Best Animation: Tehura
- Kumeyaay Award: The Wind & the Reckoning
- Best Local Film: Don't Do It
- Best Student Film: Black Whole
- Valor Award: Mending the Line (dir. John Waller)

Audience Choice Awards:

- Audience Choice Feature: The Wind & the Reckoning
- Audience Choice Doc: Love, Charlie: The Rise and Fall of Chef Charlie Trotter
- Audience Choice Short: Moon
- Audience Choice Gala: The Banshees of Inisherin

=== SDiFF2021 ===
Oct 14-24, 2021

- Best Feature Film: Queen of Glory (dir. Nana Mensah)
- Best Documentary Feature: Holy Frit (dir. Justin Monroe)
- Best International Feature: Petite Maman (dir. Céline Sciamma)
- Best Thriller Feature: The Boathouse (dir. Hannah Cheesman)
- Best Drama Feature: The Beta Test (dir. Jim Cummings)
- Best Comedy Feature: They/Them/Us (dir. Jon Sherman)
- Best Ensemble Cast: Voodoo Macbeth
- Best Short Doc: The Bitter Root
- Best International Short: Good Morning, Ignacio (dir. Alan Jonsson Gavica & Leticia Fabián)
- Best Animation: Freebird
- Kumeyaay Award: Pictures of My People (dir. Mark Ruberg)
- Military Award: Do Not Hesitate
- Best Local Film: Cheyenne
- Best Student (College): Cheyenne
- Best Student (High School): Mazel Tov
- Chris Brinker Award: Women is Losers (dir. Lissette Feliciano)

Audience Choice Awards:

- Audience Choice Feature: Somos ecos
- Audience Choice Doc: The Disruptors (dir. Stephanie Soechtig)
- Audience Choice Short: Munkie (dir. Steven Chow)
- Audience Choice Gala: Belfast (dir. Kenneth Branagh)

=== SDiFF2020 ===
Oct 15-18, 2020

- Best Narrative Feature: Drunk Bus (dir. John Carlucci and Brandon LaGanke)
- Best Documentary: MLK/FBI (dir. Sam Pollard)
- Best International Feature: 150 Million Magical Sparrows (dirs. Brahmanand S. Singh, Tanvi Jain)
- Best Thriller Feature: Through the Glass Darkly (dir. Lauren Fash)
- Best Drama Feature: Farewell Amor (dir. Ekwa Msangi)
- Best Comedy Feature: Eat Wheaties! (dir. Scott Abramovitch)
- Best Ensemble Cast: Before/During/After (dir. Stephen Kunken, Jack Lewars)
- Best Short Documentary: Panthoot (dir. Richard Reens)
- Best Short Narrative: Last Queen on Earth (dir. Michael Shumway)
- Best International Short Film: Chen Chen (dir. Kargo Chen)
- Best Animation: To: Gerard (dir. Taylor Meacham)
- Kumeyaay Award: Invasion: The Unist'ot'en's Fight for Sovereignty (dirs. Michael Toledano, Sam Vinal)
- Best Local Film: Anna (dir. Rich Underwood)
- Chris Brinker Award: The MisEducation of Bindu (dir. Prarthana Mohan)
- Artistic Director's Award: You Asked for the Facts: Bobby Kennedy at the Univ of Mississippi

Audience Choice Awards:

- Audience Choice Documentary: The Mustangs: America's Wild Horses
- Audience Choice Short: Feeling Through (dir. Doug Roland)
- Audience Choice Gala: Nomadland
- Audience Choice Feature: Drunk Bus

=== SDiFF2019 ===
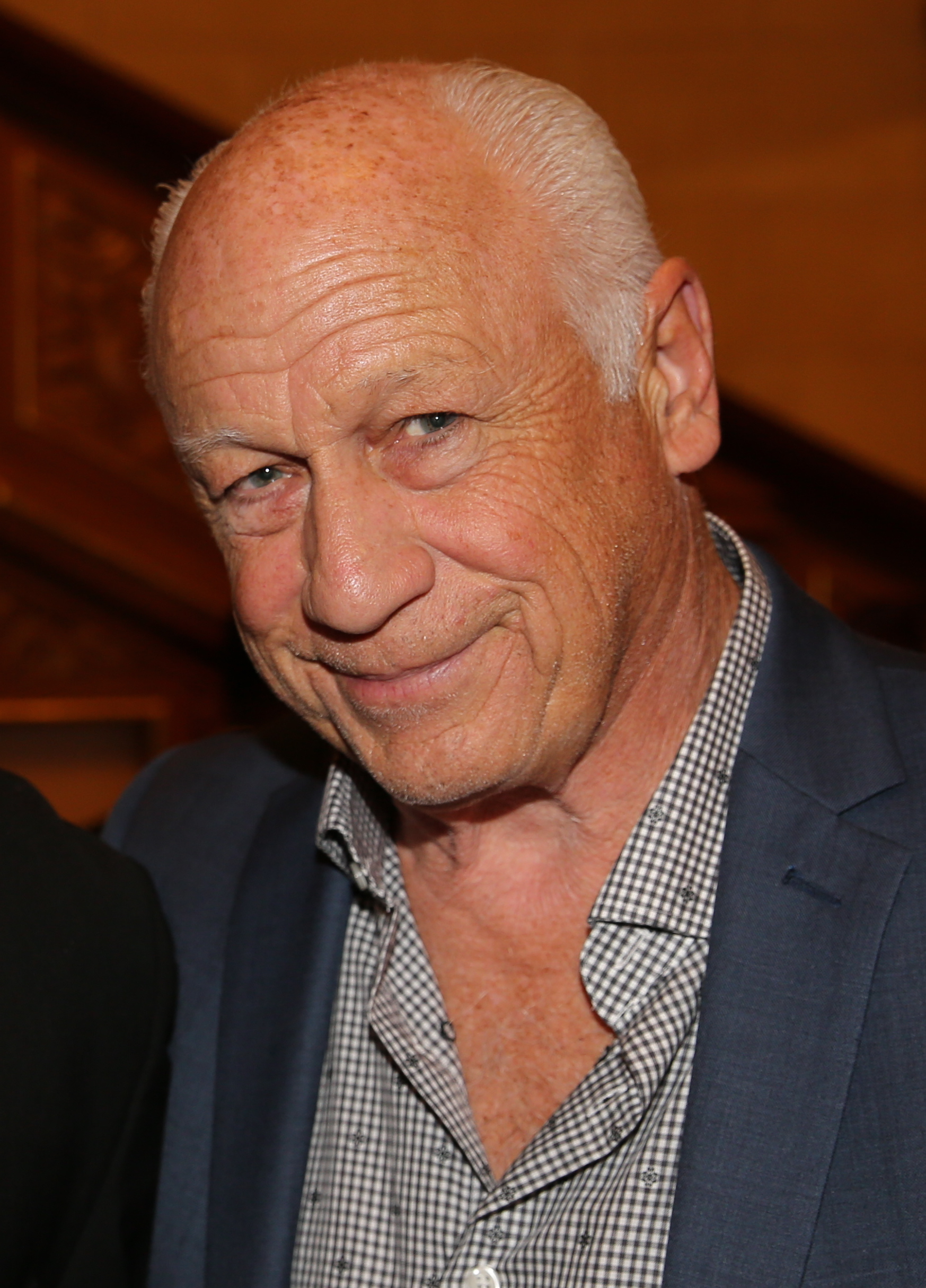
Joey Travolta directed Carol of the Belles, Winner of the 2019 Audience Award for Best Feature Film Award

Oct 15-20, 2019

- Best Narrative Feature : The Steed (dir. Erdenebileg Ganbold)
- Best Documentary: Breaking Their Silence: Women on the Frontline of the Poaching War (dir. Kerry David)
- Best Short Film: Long Time Listener, First Time Caller (dir. Nora Kirkpatrick)
- Best International Short Film: Portraitist (dir. Cyrus Neshvad)
- Best Animation: Riptide
- Best Global Cinema: Philophobia (dir. Guy Davies)
- Kumeyaay Award: Angelique's Isle (dir. Marie-Hélène Cousineau, Michelle Derosier)
- Best Ensemble Cast: Inside Game (dir. Randall Batinkoff)
- Best Original Screenplay: Love in Kilnerry (dir. Daniel Keith)
- Best World Premiere: 100 Days to Live (dir. Ravin Gandhi)
- Best Student Film: Sonora
- Best Local Film: Flourish (dir. Christopher Allan Francis, Nicole Franco)
- Best Comedy Film: Babysplitters (dir. Sam Friedlander)
- Best Thriller Feature: Safe Inside (dir. Renata Gabryjelska)
- Litecoin Filmmaker Award: Philophobia
- Artistic Director's Award: Safe Spaces (dir. Daniel Schechter)

Audience Choice Awards:

- Studio Film: Marriage Story (dir. Noah Baumbach)
- Feature Film: Carol of the Bells (dir. Joey Travolta)
- Documentary: Breaking Their Silence, Women on the Frontline of the Poaching War (dir. Kerry David)
- Short Film: Men of Vision (dir. Frank Todaro)

=== SDiFF2018 ===
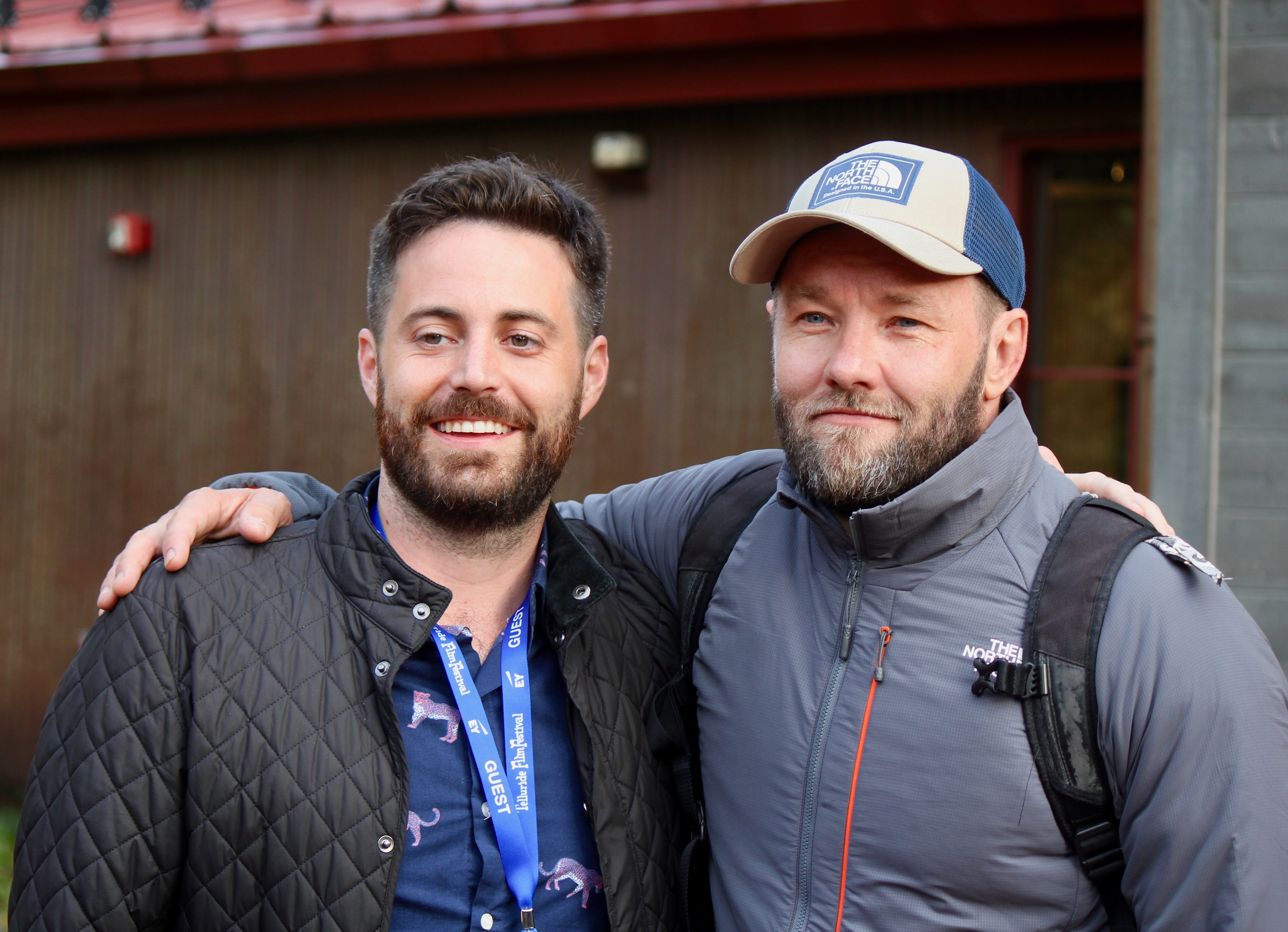
Garrard Conley & Joel Edgerton, writer and director of Boy Erased

Oct 10-14, 2018 | Jury Awards:

- Best Animation: The Driver is Red (dir. Randall Christopher)
- Best Student Film: Learning to Swim
- Best Global Cinema: My Name is "Batlir", Not Butler (dir. Stare Yildirim)
- Kumeyaay Award: Indian Horse
- Most Inspirational Film: The Push (dir. Grant Korgan, Brian Niles)
- Best World Premiere: Electric Love (dir. Aaron Fradkin)
- Best Local Film: Daisy Belle (dir. William Wall)
- Best Local Breakout: Romance is Dead (dir. Todd Jackson)
- Best Short Film: Akeda (dir. Dan Bronfield)
- Best Short Comedy Film: Hero (dir. Drew and Nate Garcia)
- Best Documentary: Stroop: Journey into the Rhino Horn War
- Best Thriller: Rust Creek
- Best Breakout Feature: I May Regret (dir. Graham Streeter)
- Best Feature Film: Tiger
- Artistic Directors' Award: Soufra (dir. Thomas A. Morgan)

Audience Choice Awards:

- Best Documentary: Soufra
- Best Feature: I May Regret
- Best Short: Your Call Is Important To Us
- Best Studio: Boy Erased

=== SDiFF2017 ===
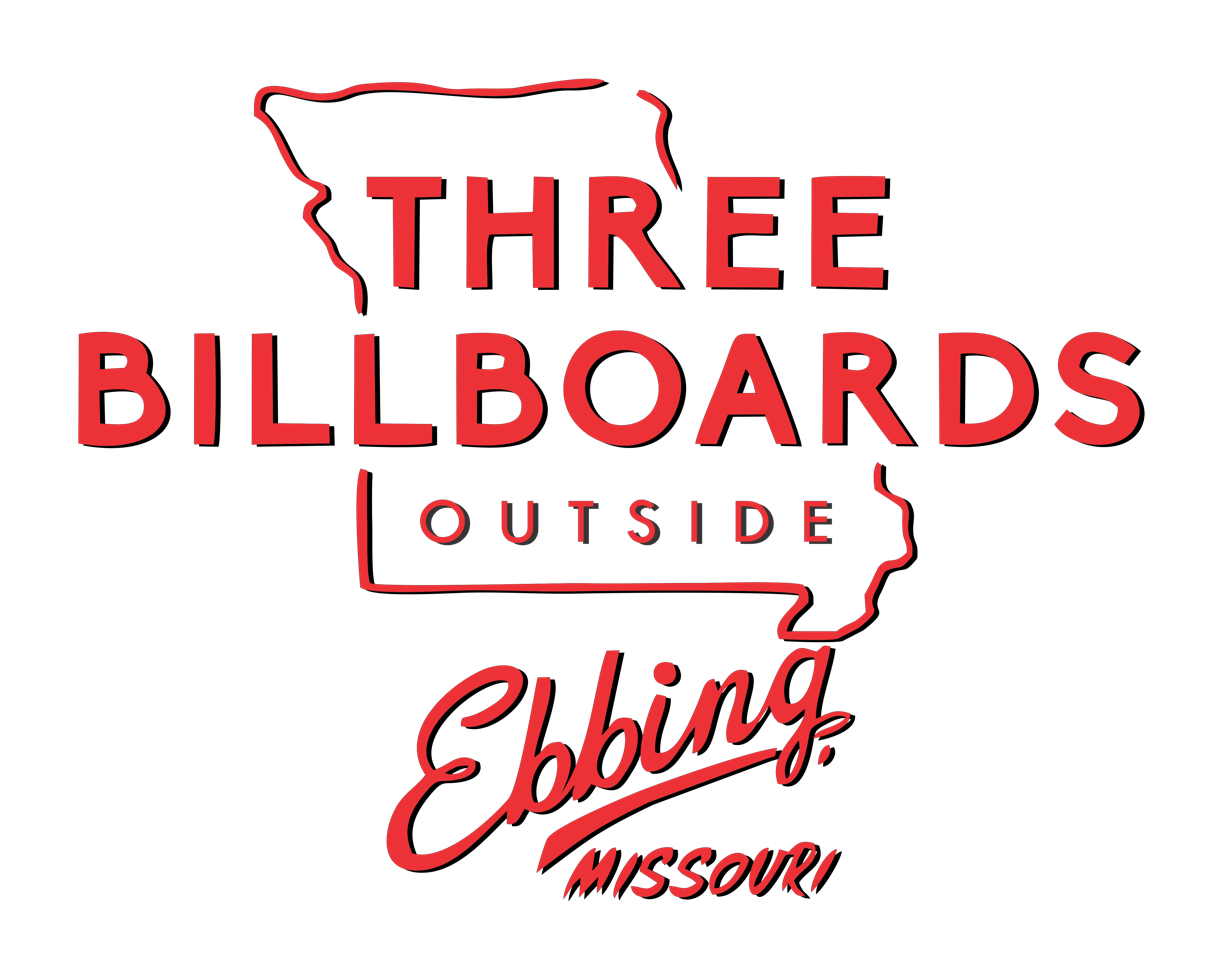
Audience Choice Award Winner for Best Studio Film

Oct 4-8, 2017 | Jury Awards:

- Best Narrative Feature: The Bachelors (dir. Kurt Voelker)
- Best Documentary: The Last Animals
- Best Short Film: The Foster Portfolio
- Best Foreign Short: Ostoja Will Move Your Piano
- Best Animated Short: Green Light (dir. Seong-Min Kim)
- Best Global Cinema: The Divine Order
- Kumeyayy Eagle Award: Waabooz (dir. Molly Katagiri)
- Best Military Film: Apache Warrior (dir. David Salzberg, Christian Tureaud)
- Best Ensemble Film: Butterfly Caught (dir. Manny Rodriguez Jr.)
- Best World Premiere: Dismissed (dir. Benjamin Arfmann)
- Best Comedy Feature: The Lonely Italian (dir. Lee Farber)
- Best Breakthrough Feature: Selling Isobel
- Chairman's Award: Dog Years (dir. Adam Rifkin)

Audience Choice Awards:

- Best Documentary: Resistance is Life (dir. Apo W. Bazidi)
- Best Feature: Life Hack
- Best Short: The Dog With the Woman (dir. Phoebe Arnstein, Stephen Ledger-Lomas)
- Best Studio: Three Billboards Outside Ebbing, Missouri

=== SDiFF2016 ===
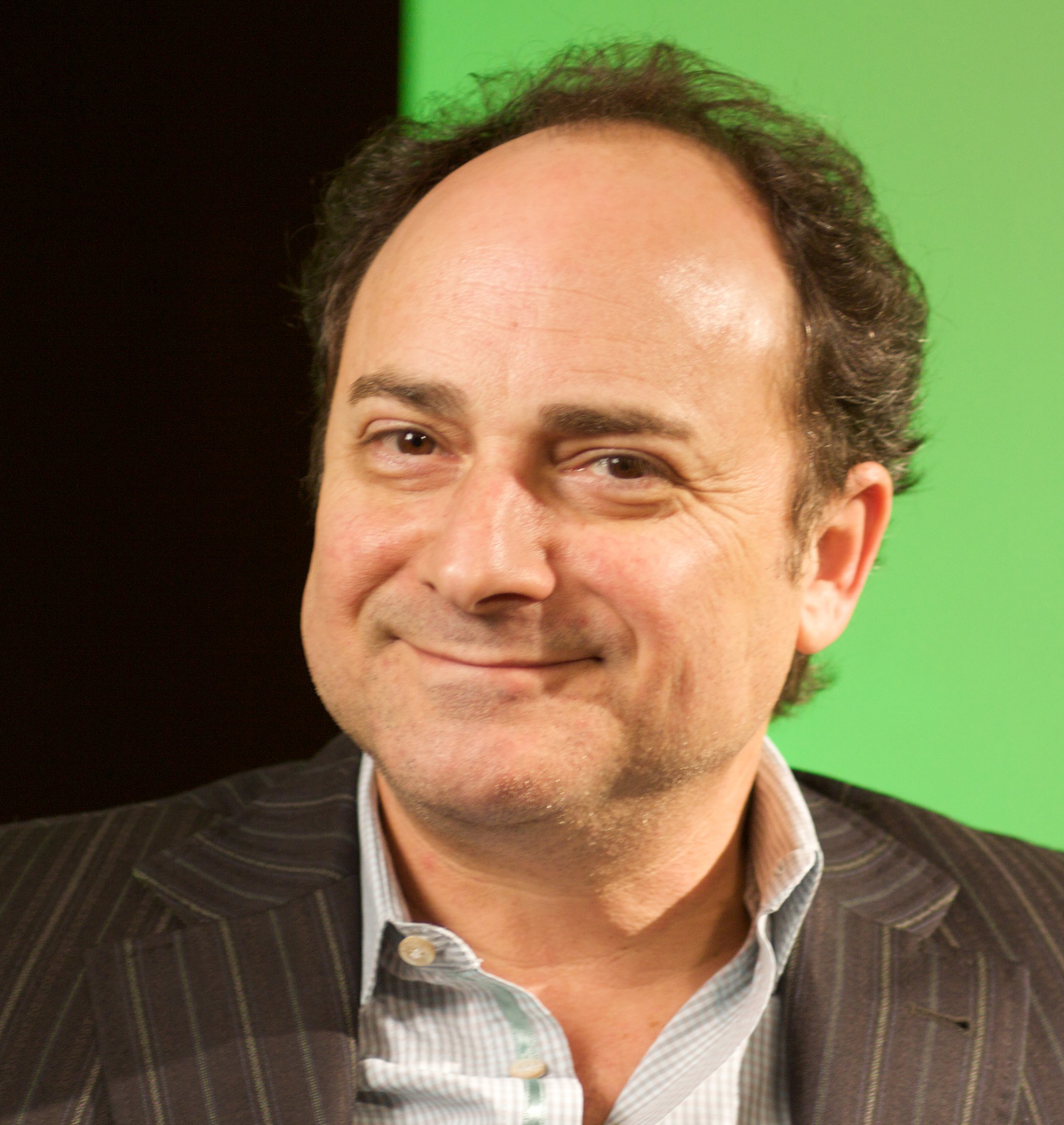
Kevin Pollak accepted the Best Comedy Award in 2016 for The Late Bloomer which he directed.

Sept 28-Oct 2, 2016 | Jury Awards:

- Best Narrative Short: Bon Voyage (dir. Marc Raymond Wilkin)
- Best Comedy: The Late Bloomer (dir. Kevin Pollak)
- Best Military Film: Railway Spine (dir. Samuel Gonzalez, Jr.)
- Kumeyayy Eagle Award: Te Ata (dir. Nathan Frankowski)
- Best Documentary: Political Animals
- Best International Film: Julieta (dir. Pedro Almodovar)
- Breakthrough Feature: Po
- Chairman's Award: Citizen Soldier (dir. David Salzberg, Christian Tureaud)
- Best Narrative Feature: So B. It
- Breakthrough Documentary: In Utero

Audience Choice Awards:

- Best Documentary: Seed: The Untold Story
- Best International Film: The Cliff (Acantilado)
- Best Narrative Feature: Dead Draw (dir. Brian Klemesrud)
- Best Narrative Short: Mine (dir. Simon Berry)

=== SDFF2015 ===
Sep 30-Oct 4, 2015 | Jury Awards:

- Best Narrative Feature – Diablo
- Best Documentary – India's Daughter
- Best International Film – Victoria
- Best Narrative Short – SubRosa (dir. Thora Hilmarsdottir)
- Best Animated Film – SOAR (dir. Alyce Tzue)
- Best Military Film – No Greater Love (dir. Justin Roberts)
- Kumeyaay Award – For Blood (dir. Chadwick Pelletier, John T. Connor)
- Chairman's Award – Kidnap Capital

Audience Choice:

- Best Feature – Moments of Clarity
- Best Documentary – Return to Dak To
- Best Short – The Gunfighter (dir. Eric Kissack)
- Best Gala – He Named Me Malala

=== SDFF2014 ===
Sep 24-28, 2014 | Jury Awards:

- Best Narrative Feature: Where the Road Runs Out (dir. Rudolf Buitendach)
- Best Documentary: Waiting for Mamu
- Best International: Schimbarev (dir. Álex Sampayo)
- Best Narrative Short: The Bravest, The Boldest (dir. Moon Molson)
- Best Animated Film: The Dam Keeper
- Kumeyaay Award: Sycuan: Our People. Our Culture. Our History.
- U-T San Diego Award: Where the Road Runs Out
- Chairman's Award: The Hornet's Nest

Audience Choice:

- Best Gala Film: The Imitation Game
- Best Feature: Cas & Dylan
- Best Documentary: Waiting for Mamu
- Best Short: Sure Thing
- Best International: Noble

=== SDFF2013 ===
Oct 2-6, 2013 | Jury Awards:

- Best Narrative Feature: Autumn Blood
- Best Latin Feature: Dirty Hearts

=== SDFF2011 ===
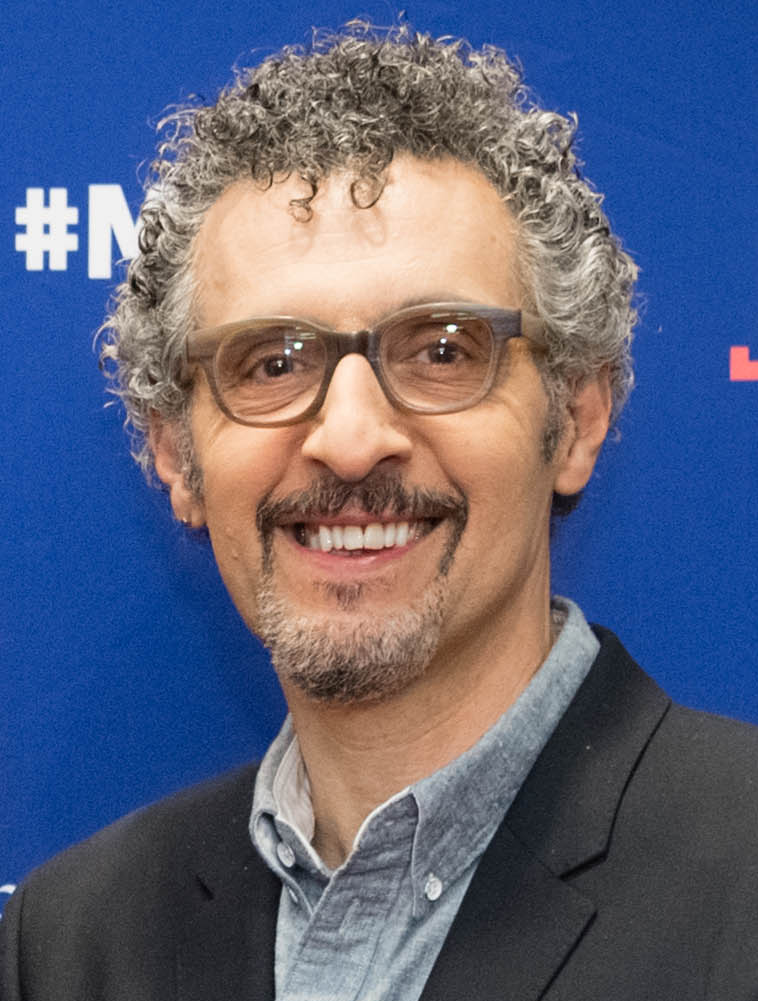
- John Turturro won Best Actor Award in 2011
  Best Narrative Feature - East Fifth Bliss (dir. Michael Knowles)
- Best Documentary - Semper Fi: Always Faithful (dir. Tony Hardmon & Rachel Libert)
- Best Short Film - It Takes Balls (dir. Benoit Lach)
- Best San Diego Film - Repeat After Me (dir. Bryan Bangerter)
- Best Screenplay - James Westby (Rid of Me)
- Best Actor - John Turturro, (Somewhere Tonight)
- Best Actress - Rachel Boston (The Pill)

Audience Choice:

- Best Feature - Like Crazy (dir. Drake Doremus)
- Best Documentary - The Highest Pass, dir. Jon Fitzgerald

=== SDFF2010 ===
- Best Narrative Feature - A Little Help
- Best Documentary - Waiting for Superman
- Best Short Film - Touch
- Best San Diego Film - This is Charlotte King, dir. Jeffrey Durkin
- Best Actor - Drew Fuller (The Kane Files: Life in Trial)
- Best Actress - Emily VanCamp (Norman)

Audience Choice:

- Best Feature - Nowhere Boy
- Best Documentary - Waiting for Superman

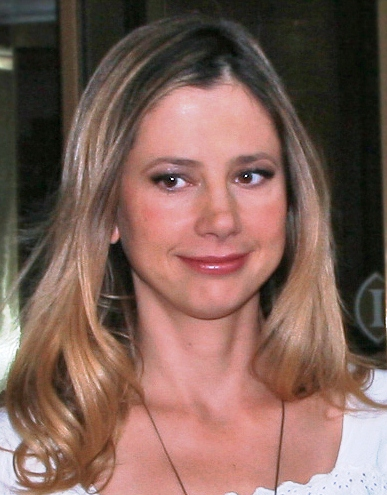
Mira Sorvino won the Best Actress Award in 2009

=== SDFF2009 ===
- Best Narrative Feature - Formosa Betrayed (dir. Adam Kane)
- Best Documentary - American Harmony
- Best Short Film - True Beauty This Night
- Best Music Video - Reilly's "Sunlight" (Dir. David Altrogge)
- Best San Diego Film - Wyland Earth Day (Dir. Chris Marrow)
- Best Screenplay - Shem Bitterman (The Job)
- Best Actor - James Van Der Beek (Formosa Betrayed)
- Best Actress - Mira Sorvino (Like Dandelion Dust)

Audience Choice:

- Best Feature - Reach for Me (dir. LeVar Burton)
- Best Documentary - Jesse's Story (dir. Mark S. Jacobs)

=== SDFF2008 ===
- Best Feature - Summerhood (dir. Jacob Medjuck)
- Best Actress - Sasha Alexander - The Last Lullaby
- Best Actor - Michael Tassoni - The Appearance of a Man (dir. Daniel Pace)
- Heineken Red Star Award - The Appearance of a Man
- Physical Graffiti Best Action Sports Story - Against the Grain
- Best Short - In the Name of the Son
- Best Documentary - Uncounted (dir. David Earnhardt)
- Best Music Video - Greg Laswell - How the Day Sounds
- Best San Diego Short - Residue

Audience Choice:

- Best Feature - The Last Lullaby
- Best Documentary - Speed & Angels (dir. Peyton Wilson)

=== SDFF2007 ===
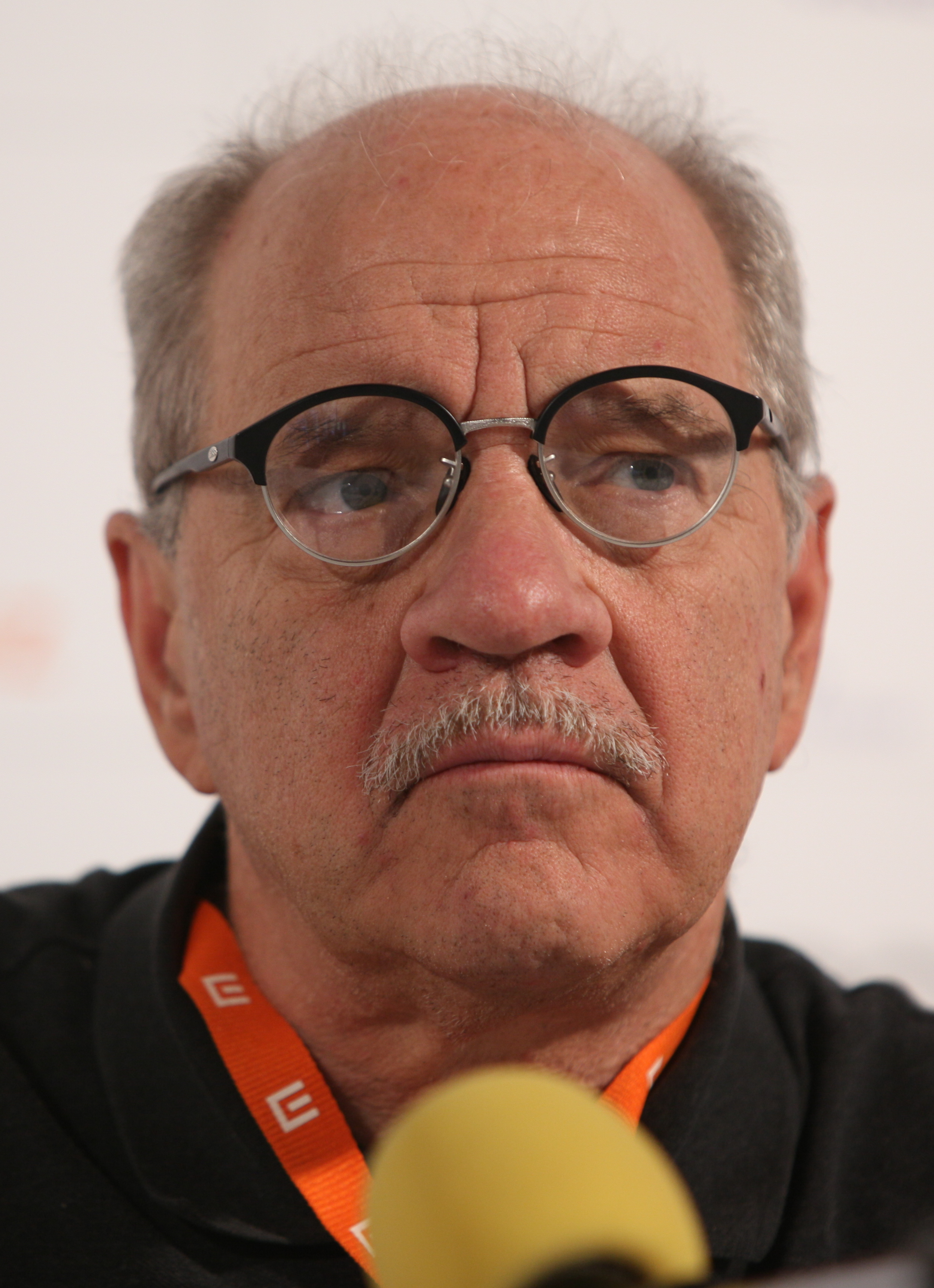
Paul Schrader won Best Screenplay in 2007

Sept 27-30, 2007

- Best Feature Film: Intervention (dir. Mary McGuckian)
- Best Documentary - Kurt Cobain: About A Son
- Best Short - Rory Kindersley, “Slingers”
- Best Director - Alfredo De Villa, Adrift in Manhattan
- Best Screenplay - The Walker, written by Paul Schrader
- Best Cinematography - The Northern Kingdom, Mark Schwartzbard
- Best Actor - Brian Petersen, Coyote
- Best Actress - Jennifer Tilly, Intervention
- Best Female Filmmaker - Annie Sunderberg, The Devil Came on Horseback
- Best San Diego Filmmaker - Greg Durbin, “Passing Through”
- Best Music Video - "Paramount" by Deadarm, Cleopatra, Kb. Directed by Carlos Florez
- Heineken Red Star Award - Killing Zelda Sparks

=== SDFF2006 ===
Sept. 27 – Oct. 1, 2006

- Best Feature Film - Danika
- Best Director - Jordan Albertsen, The Standard
- Best Screenplay - Tim Boughn, Neo Ned
- Best Documentary --Chasing the Horizon
- Best Short - "Olyver Brody"
- Best Female Filmmaker - Heather MacAllister, The Narrow Gate
- Best Actor - Ryan Donowho, The Favor
- Best Actress - Regina Hall, Danika
- San Diego Filmmaker - "Nothing To Do With Amy"
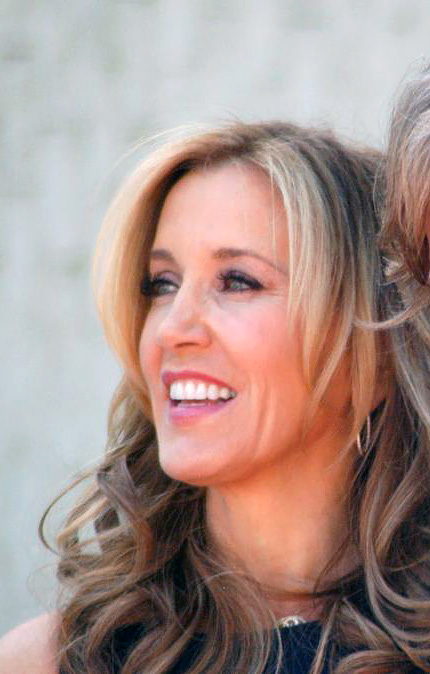
  Felicity Huffman won Best Actress in 2005
- Best Music Video - "Just Go", Misdirection
- Best Music Video Director—Fernando Apodaca, "Life Wasted", Pearl Jam

Audience Choice:

- Best Feature - Neo Ned
- Best Documentary - The Creek Runs Red

=== SDFF2005 ===
Sept 21-25, 2005

- Best Feature Film - "Innocent Voices," (dir. Luis Mandoki)
- Best Documentary - "Earthlings," (dir. Shaun Monson)
- Best Short Film - "Apartment 206," (dir. Gregory Zymet)
- Best Screenplay - "When Do We Eat," (dir. Nina Davidovich & Salvador Litvak)
- Best Actor - Carlos Padilla Lenero, "Innocent Voices"
- Best Actress - Felicity Huffman, "Transamerica"
- Best Director - Christopher Jaymes, "In Memory of My Father"
- San Diego Feature Film - "Everyone Their Grain of Sand", (dir. Elizabeth Bird)
- San Diego Filmmaker – Canaan Brumley, "Ears, Open. Eyeballs, Click."
- Crystal Vision – Gable-Cook-Schmid Public Relations

Audience Choice:

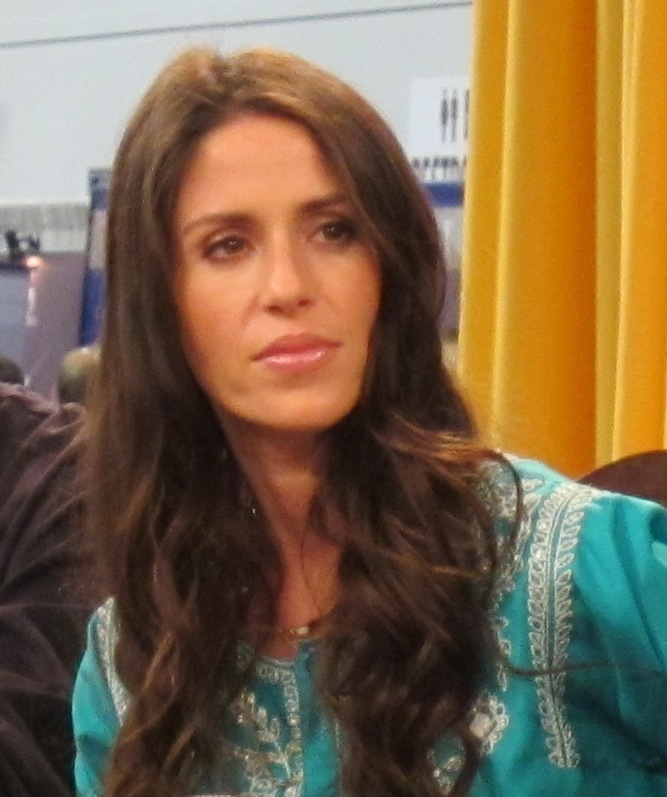
- Soleil Moon Frye directed the Best Documentary Winner in 2004
  Best Feature - "The Matador," (dir. Richard Shepard)
- Best Documentary - "Little Man," (dir. Nicole Conn )

=== SDFF2004 ===
Sept 29 - Oct 4, 2004

- Best Feature - Around the Bend, dir. Jordan Roberts
- Best Documentary - Sonny Boy, Soleil Moon Frye
- Best Short – American Made, dir. Sharat Raju
- Best Director – Black Cloud, Rick Shroeder
- Best Screenplay – Celeste Davis (Purgatory House)
- SD Screenwriting Contest Winner – "Whitefish", George Olson
- Best Actor - James Russo (The Box)
- Best Actress - Sally Andrews (Her Majesty)
- Best San Diego Feature Film - Never Been Done, (dir. Matthew Powers)
- Best San Diego Filmmaker - Devin Scott

=== SDFF2003 ===
- Best Feature - "I am David" Paul Feig
- Best Director Award - A. W. Vidmer (Stuey)
- Best Screenplay Award: Rodney Lee Conover, Jeffrey Hause & David Hines (Bachelorman)

== Night of the Stars Honorees ==
=== SDiFF2026 ===
October 13, 2026

Hosts: Carlo Cecchetto and Marcella Lee

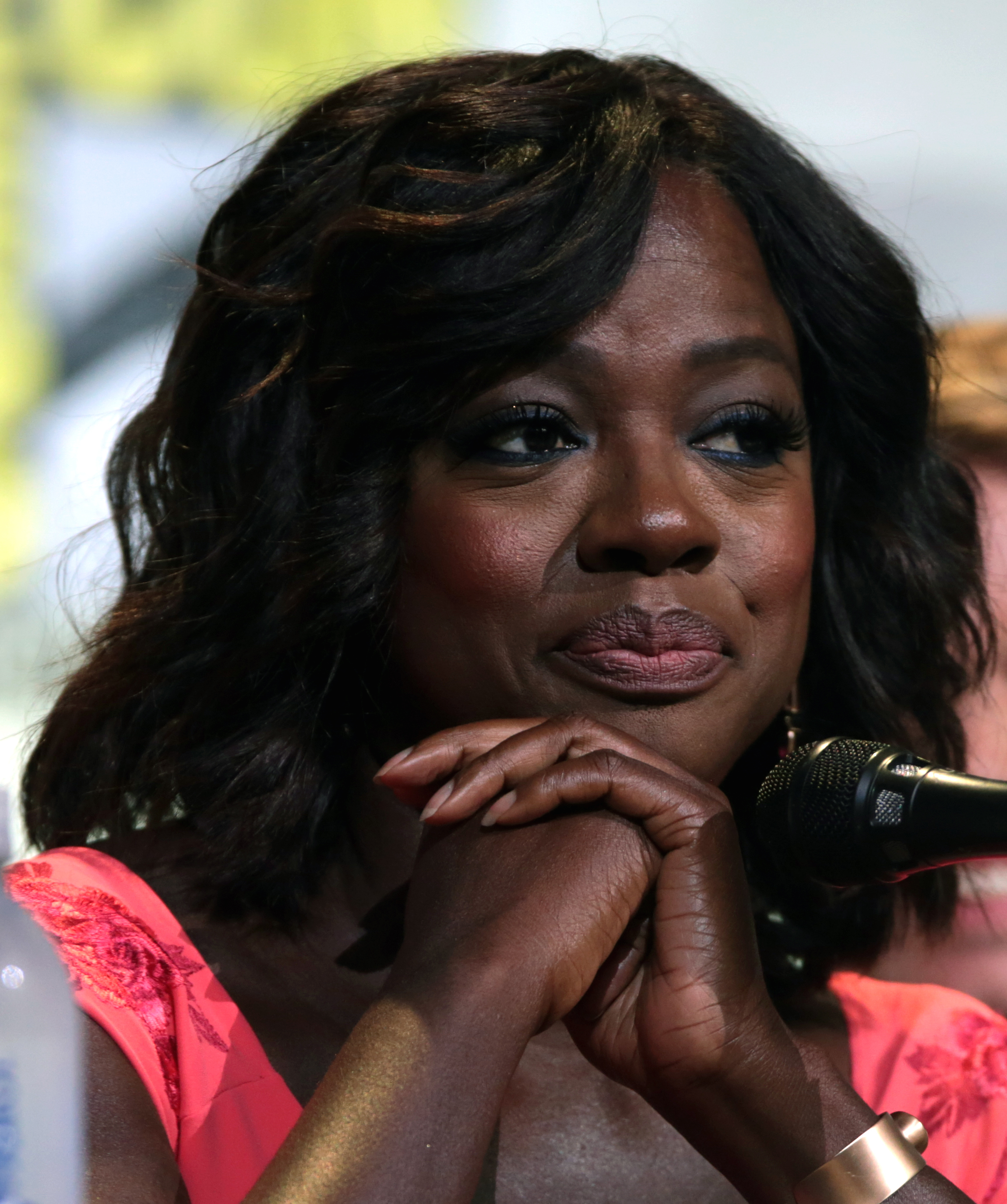
- Viola Davis
  Gregory Peck Award: Viola Davis
- Virtuoso Award: Mira Sorvino
- Trailblazer Award: Iliza Shlesinger

=== SDiFF2025 ===
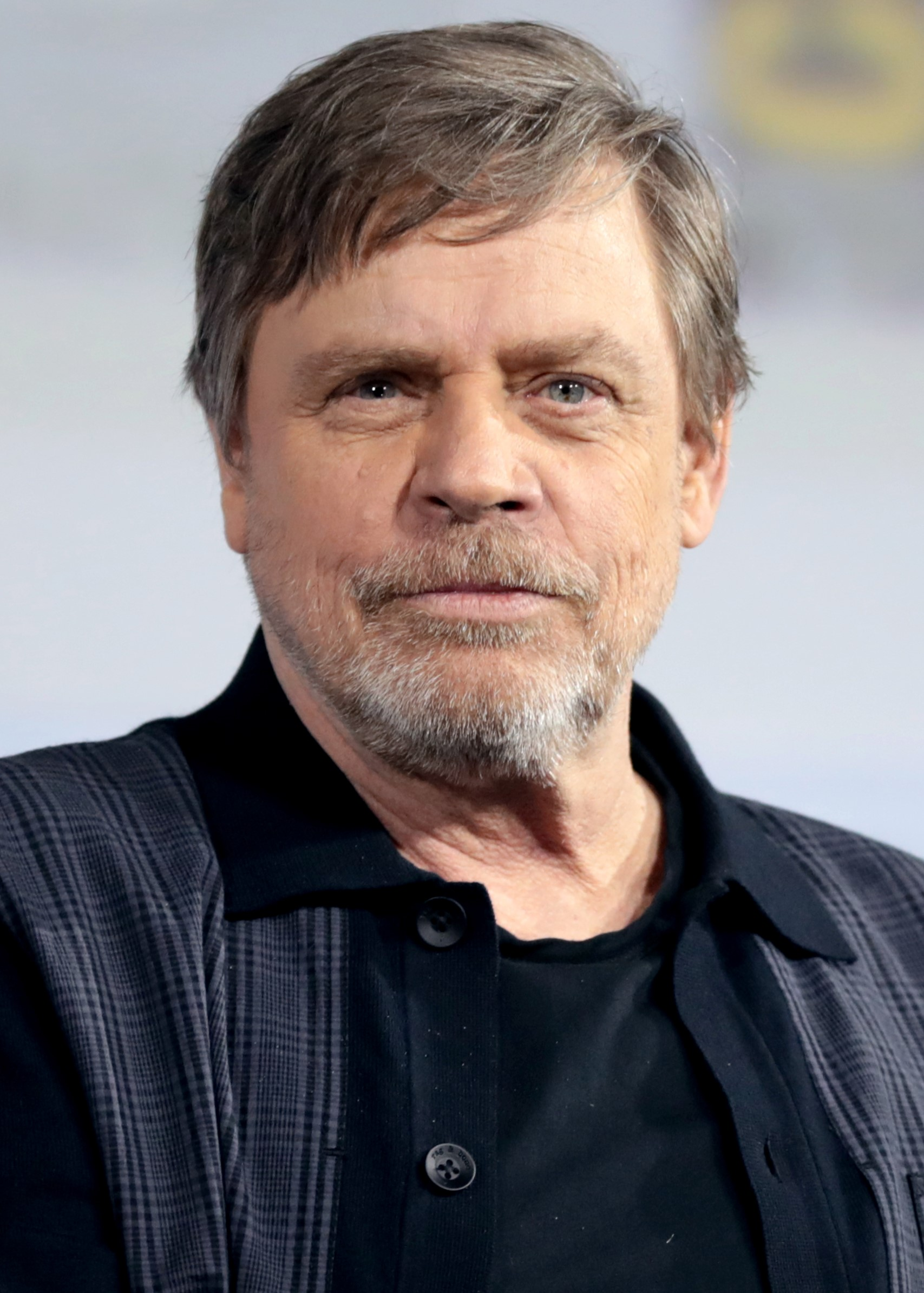
Mark Hamill honored with the Gregory Peck Award in 2025

October 16, 2025

- Gregory Peck Award: Mark Hamill
- Visionary Impact Award: Marlee Matlin
- Virtuoso Award: John Magaro
- Spotlight Award: Joe Mangianello

Festival guests: Brian Austin Green

=== SDiFF2024 ===
October 17, 2024

- Gregory Peck Award: Penelope Ann Miller
- Cinema Vanguard Award: Alessandro Nivola
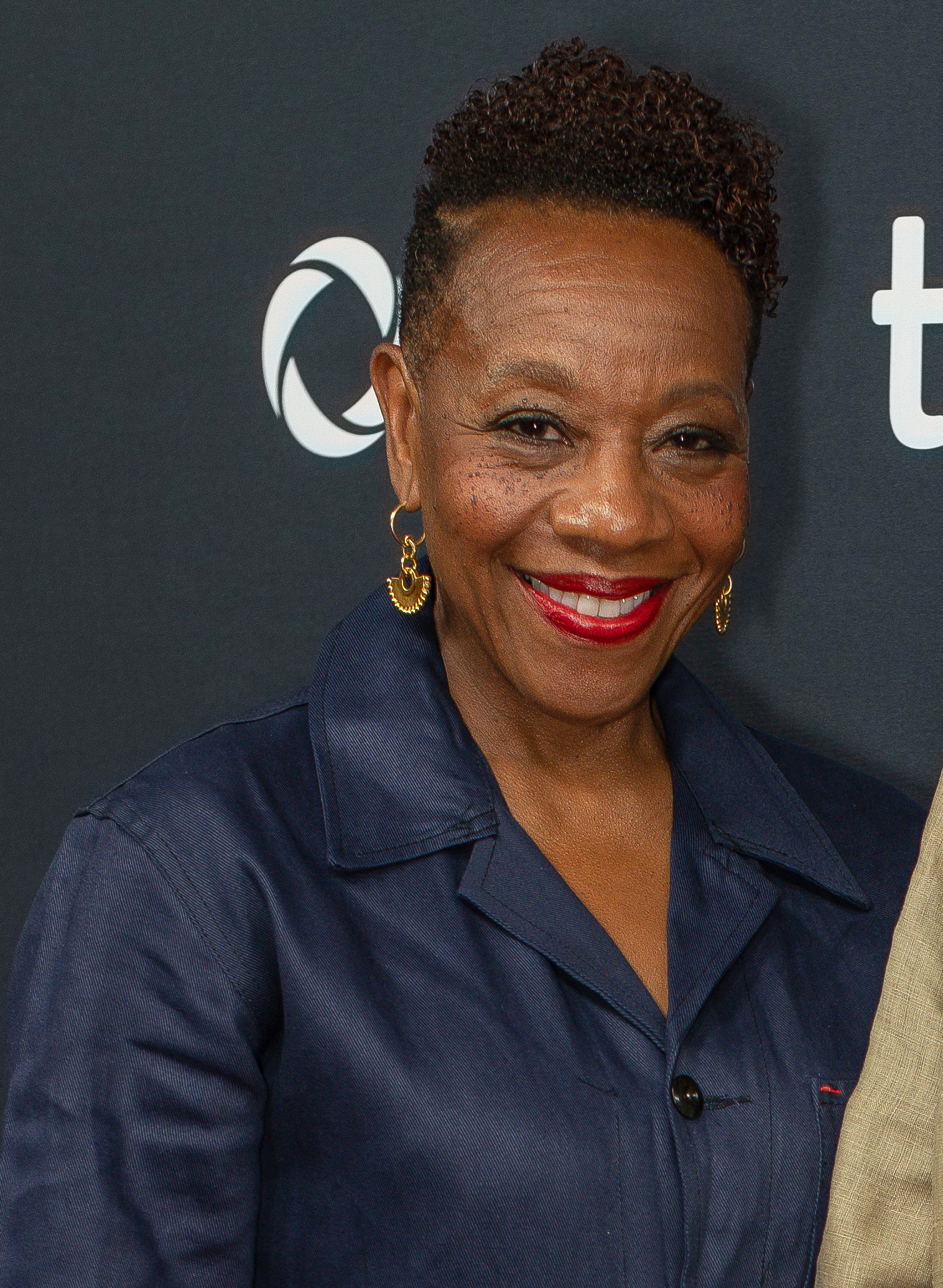
- Marianne Jean-Baptiste won the Virtuoso Award in 2024
  Virtuoso Award: Marianne Jean-Baptiste
- Humanitarian Award: Lhakpa Sherpa
- Auteur Award: Amanda Righetti

=== SDiFF2023 ===
No awards banquet was held in 2021 due to the 2023 SAG/AFTRA strike.

=== SDiFF2022 ===
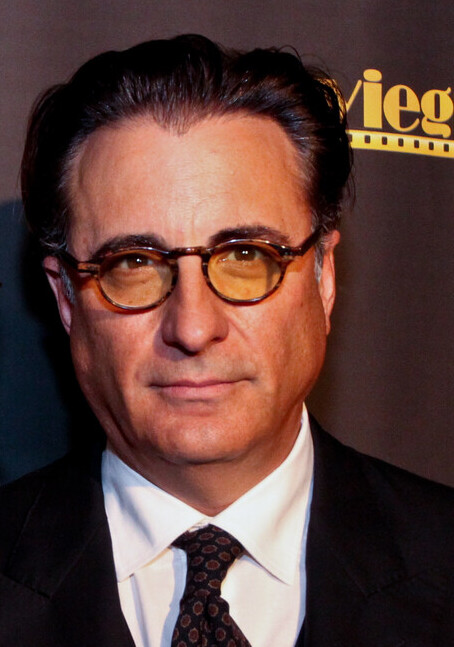
Andy Garcia received the Gregory Peck Award on October 20, 2022

Oct 20, 2022 | The Conrad Prebys Performing Arts Center in La Jolla

- Gregory Peck Award: Andy Garcia
- Cinema Vanguard: Regina Hall
- Fairbanks: Tony Hale
- Virtuoso Award: Lisa Ann Walker
- Humanitarian Award: Dr. Brook Parker-Bello
- Spotlight Award: Colson Baker

Festival Guests: Jung Ryeo-won, District Attorney Summer Stephan

=== SDiFF2021 ===
Oct 14-24, 2021

No awards banquet was held in 2021 due to COVID-19 protocols about social distancing.

=== SDiFF2020 ===
No awards banquet was held in 2020 due to COVID-19 protocols about social distancing.

=== SDiFF2019 ===
Oct 18, 2019 | Pendry Hotel San Diego

Host: Scott Mantz

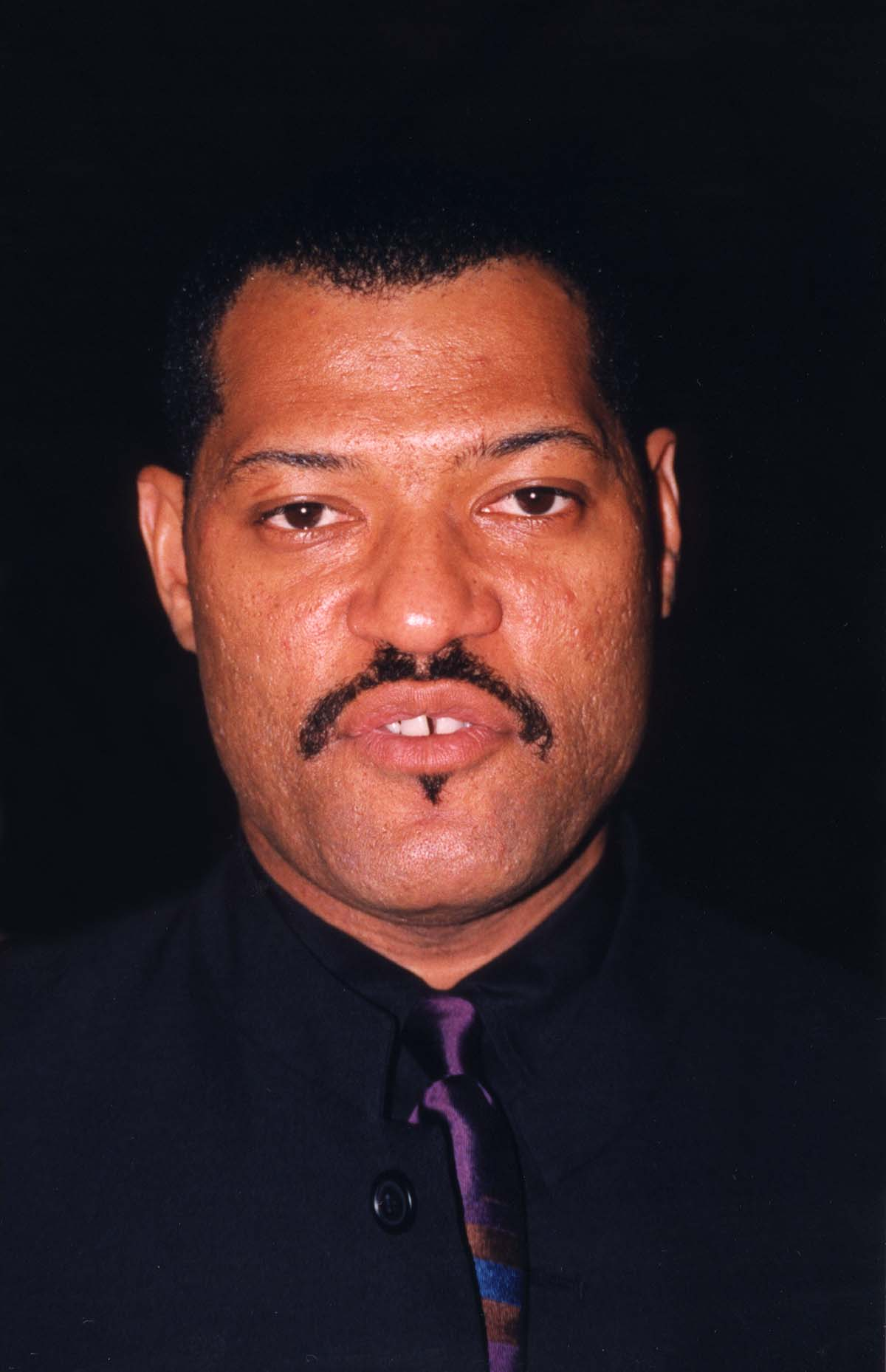
- Laurence Fishburne won the Gregory Peck Award in 2019
  Gregory Peck Award: Laurence Fishburne
- Humanitarian Award: Lindsay Wagner
- Cinema Vanguard: Jared Harris
- Music Icon Award: Pitbull (not present)
- Fairbanks Award: Jillian Bell
- Rising Star Award: Camila Morrone
- Chris Brinker Award: Ravin Gandhi

Festival Guests: Stephen Gyllenhaal, Cindy Marten.

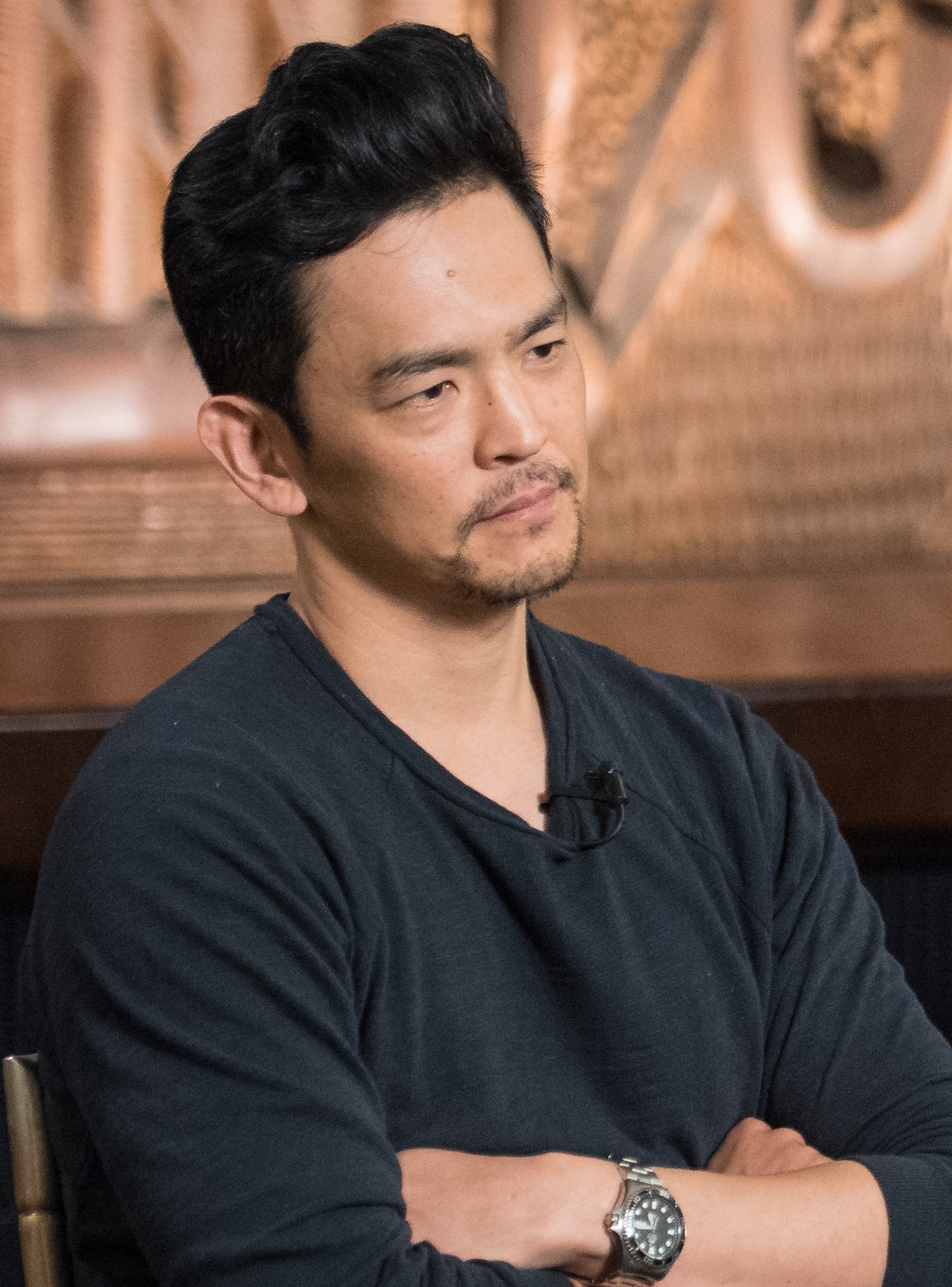
John Cho won the Spotlight Award in 2018

=== SDiFF2018 ===
Oct 11, 2018 | Pendry Hotel San Diego

Host: Scott Mantz

- Gregory Peck Award: Keith Carradine
- Music Icon Award: Kenny Loggins
- Cinema Vanguard Award: Topher Grace
- Fairbanks Award: Kathryn Hahn
- Nemeth Humanitarian Award: Zachary Levi
- Spotlight Award: John Cho
- Auteur Award: Alex Wolff
- Rising Star Award: Christian Navarro
- Chris Brinker Award: Stare Yildirim

Festival Guests: Hal Linden, Nat Wolff, Jassa Ahluwalia

=== SDiFF2017 ===
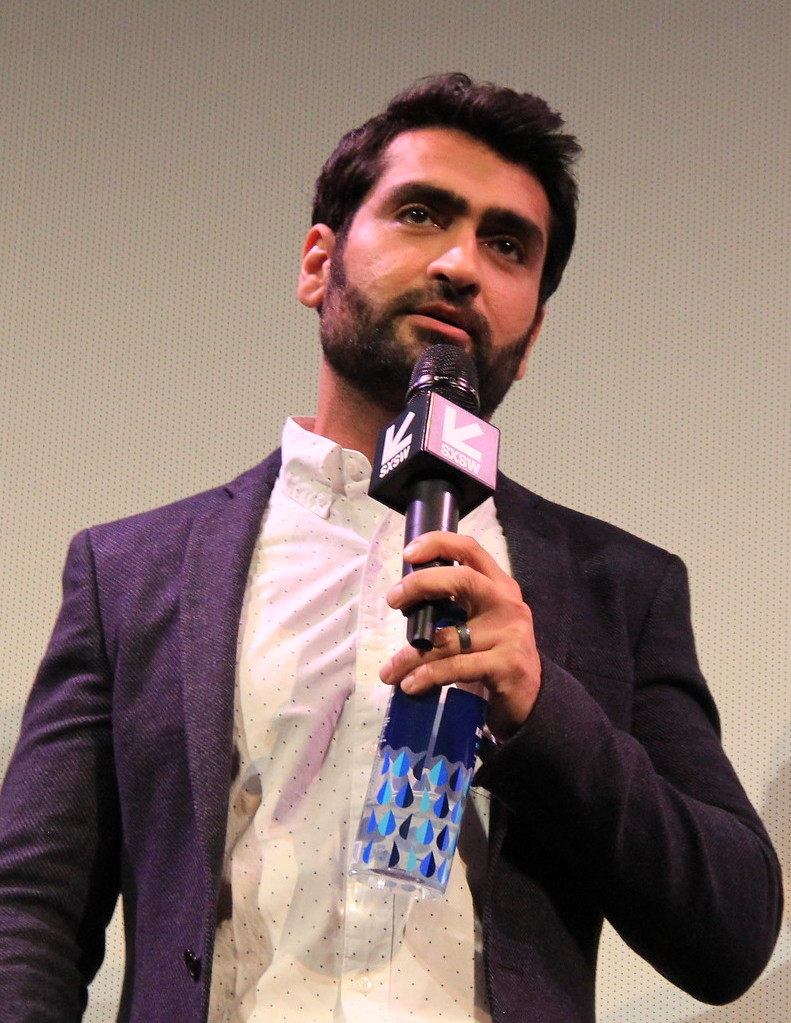
Kumail Nanjiani won the Auteur Award in 2017

Oct 5, 2017 | Pendry Hotel San Diego

Host: Jeffrey Lyons Co-hosts: Ben Lyons, Scott Mantz

- Gregory Peck Award: Patrick Stewart
- Auteur Award: Kumail Nanjiani
- Virtuoso Award: Heather Graham
- Visionary Filmmaker Award: Taran Killam
- Rising Star Award: Blake Jenner
- Chris Brinker Award: Manny Rodriguez

Festival Guests: Rian Johnson, Nick Eversman (presenter)

=== SDiFF2016 ===
Sept 29th, 2016 | Museum of Contemporary Art

Host: Jeffrey Lyons Co-hosts: Ben Lyons, Scott Mantz

- Gregory Peck Award: Annette Bening
- Auteur Award: Simon Helberg
- Cinema Vanguard Award: Kate Beckinsale
- Rising Star Award: Jason Mitchell
- Chris Brinker Award: Anne Hamilton

Festival Guests: Warren Beatty, Kevin Pollak, Josie Totah (as JJ Totah), Sean Patrick Flanery, Kweku Mandela

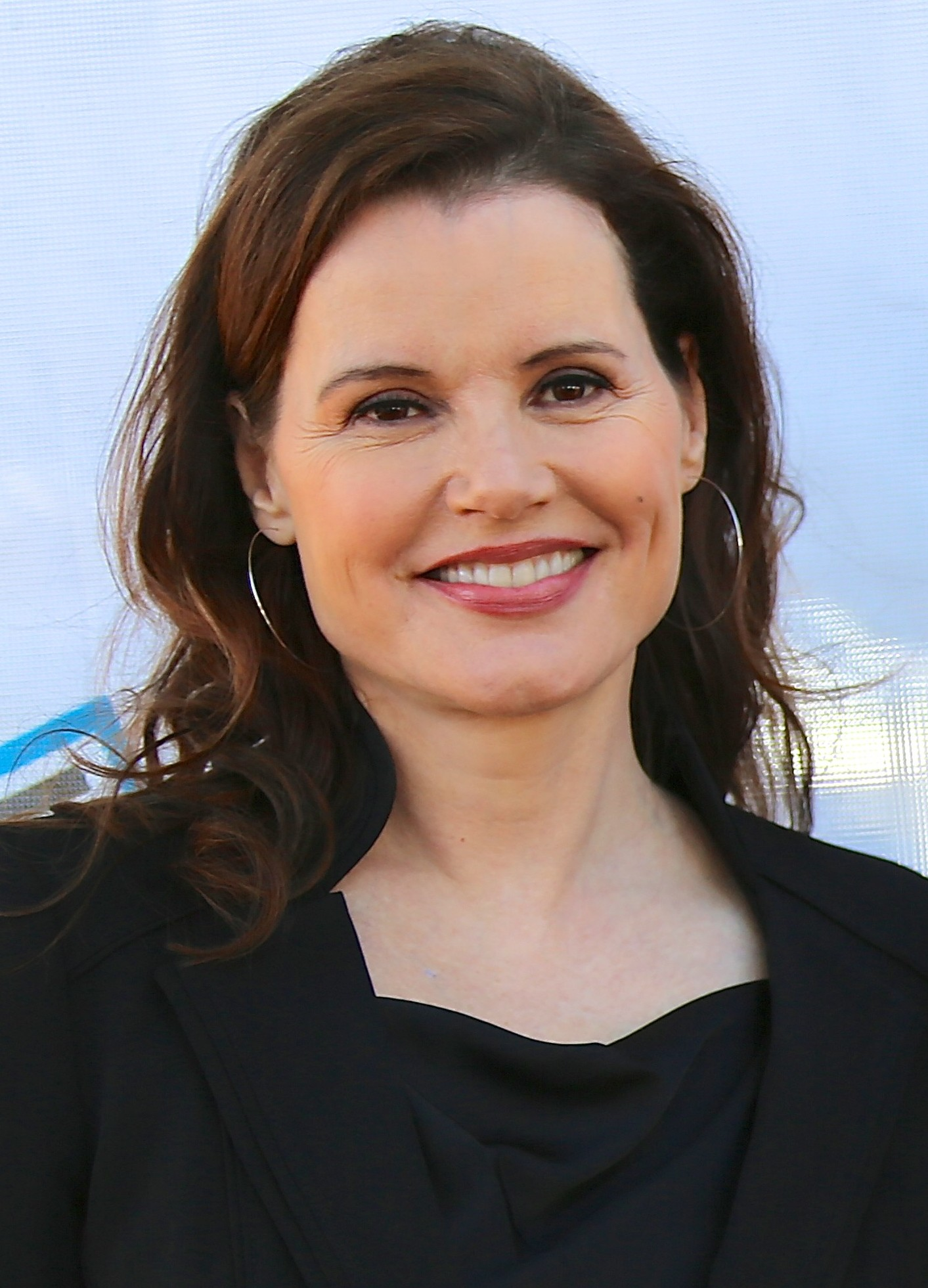
Geena Davis won the Humanitarian Award in 2015

=== SDFF2015 ===
Oct 1, 2015 - Museum of Contemporary Art

Host: Jeffrey Lyons

- Reframed Humanitarian Award: Geena Davis
- Cinema Vanguard Award: Adrien Brody
- Auteur Award: Brit Marling
- Rising Star Award: John Boyega
- Chris Brinker Award: Jack Robbins

Festival Guest:s Mika Haka, Leslee Udwin, Roger Ross Williams, Dawn Porter

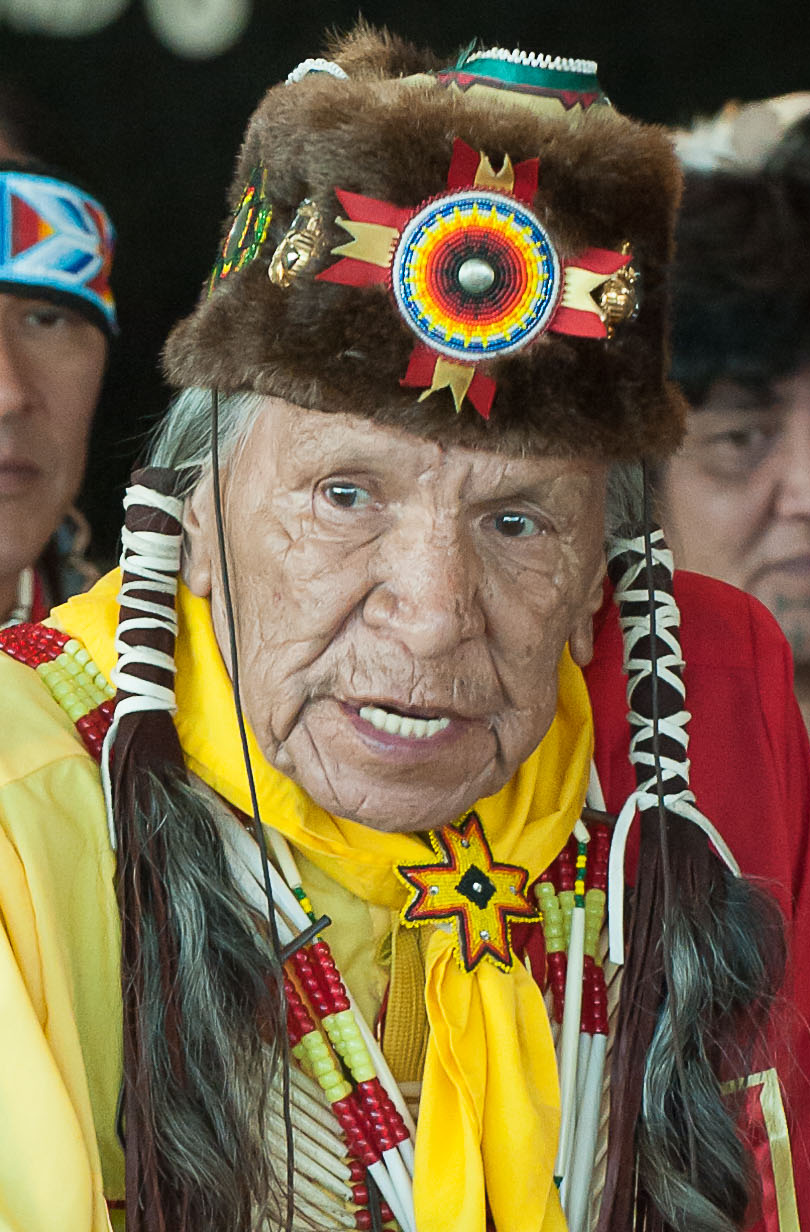
American Indian Advisory Board member Saginaw Grant received the American Legacy Award in 2014

=== SDFF2014 ===
Sept 25, 2014 | Museum of Contemporary Art

- Gregory Peck Award: Alan Arkin
- Cinema Vanguard Award: Beau Bridges
- Excellence In Acting: Michele Monaghan
- Visionary Filmmaker Award: Eli Roth
- Virtuoso Award: Alison Pill
- American Legacy Award: Saginaw Grant
- Chris Brinker Award: John Hill

Festival Guests: Tom Berenger, Josh Duhamel, Dennis Haysbert, Stelio Savante

=== SDFF2013 ===
Oct 3, 2013 | Museum of Contemporary Art

- Humanitarian Award: Mariel Hemingway
- Visionary Filmmaker Award: Judd Apatow
- Emerging Producer Award: Justin Nappi

Festival Guests: Michael B. Jordan, Troy Duffy

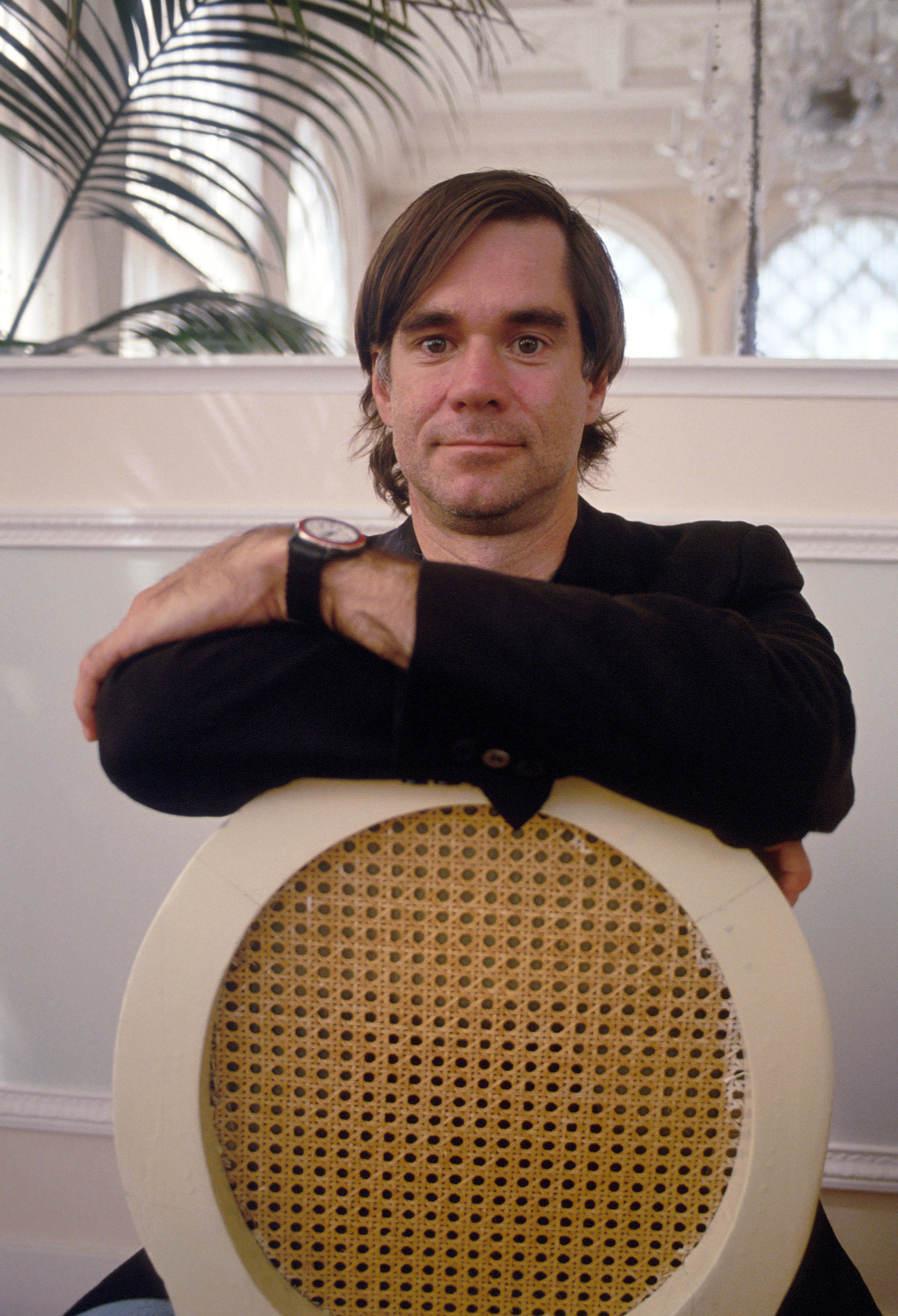
Gus Van Sant won the Visionary Filmmaker Award and received a film retrospective in 2012

=== SDFF2012 ===
Sept 27, 2012 | Museum of Contemporary Art

- Visionary Filmmaker Award: Gus Van Sant

Guests: Robin Williams, Ben Affleck, Diane Ladd, Anne Heche, Pennie Lane, Stephen Gyllenhaal, Martin McDonagh, Mark Christopher Lawrence

=== SDFF2011 ===
Sep 28-Oct 2

Confirmed Guests: Will Reiser, Tom Sizemore, Lee Hirsch

=== SDFF2010 ===
Sept 20, 2010

Guests: Jenna Fischer, Kim Coates, Leland Orser, Davis Guggenheim, Jason Ritter and Elliott Gould.

=== SDFF2009 ===
- Indie Icon Award - Seymour Cassel

Confirmed Guests: William Shatner, Richard Dreyfuss, James Van Der Beek, James Cromwell

=== SDFF2005 ===
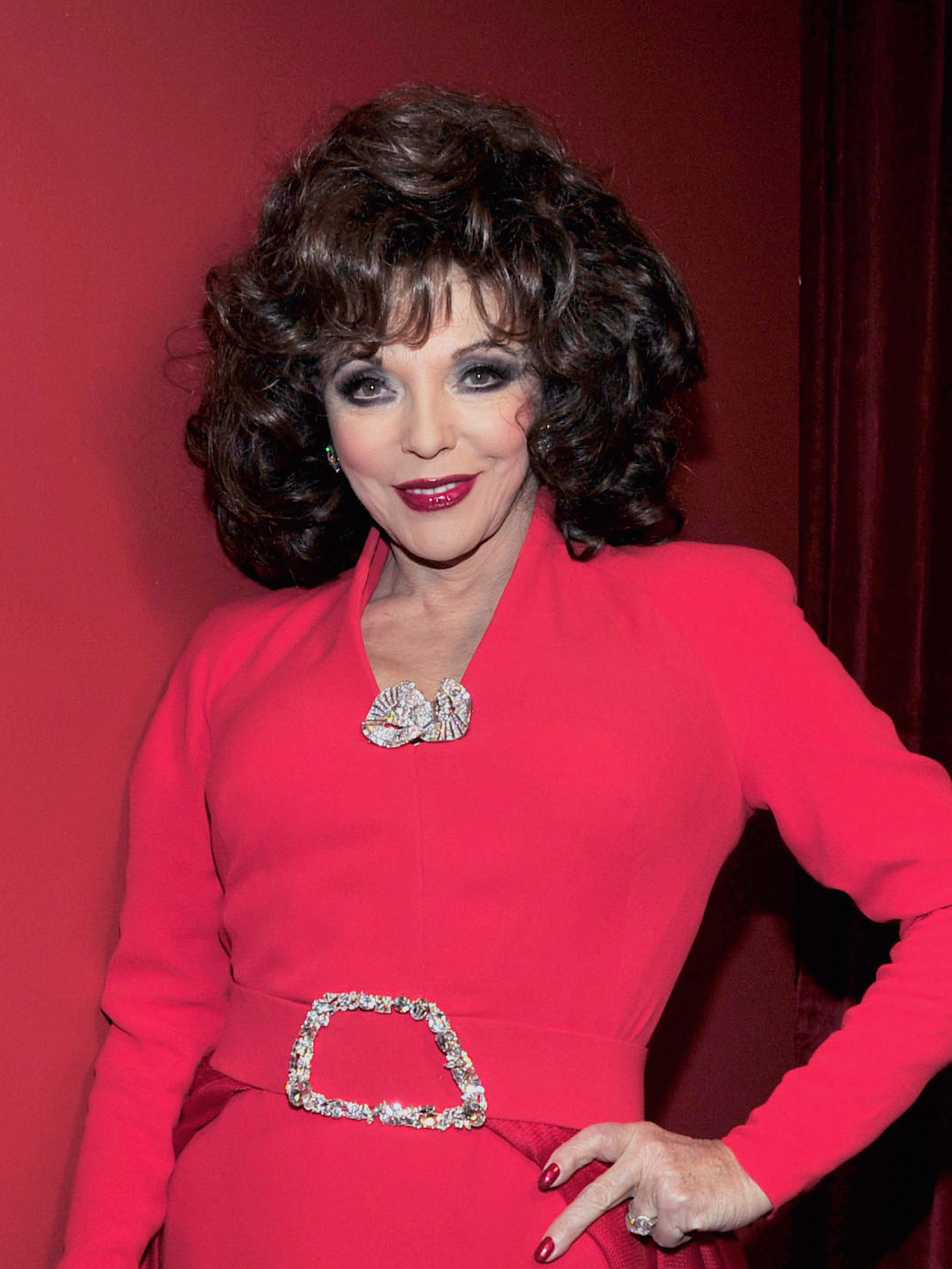
Joan Collins won a Lifetime Achievement Award in 2005

Sept 24, 2005

- Lifetime Achievement Award: Joan Collins
- Humanitarian Award: Joaquin Phoenix
- David Angell Humanitarian Award: John Walsh
- Soaring Star Award: Colin Hanks
- Discover Screenwriter Award: Paul Haggis

Confirmed Guests: Melissa Joan Hart, Bryan Greenberg, Ben Younger.

=== SDFF2004 ===
- Lifetime Achievement Award - Cliff Robertson
- Governor's Award - Phyllis Diller

=== SDFF2003 ===
- Lifetime Achievement Award - Stacy Keach

=== SDFF2002 ===
Achievement in Acting Award: James Woods

Confirmed Festival Guests: Kevin Smith, Jeff Anderson, Rod Lurie, Tatum O’Neal, Cliff Robertson, Joey Lauren Adams and Scott Baio

== By award ==
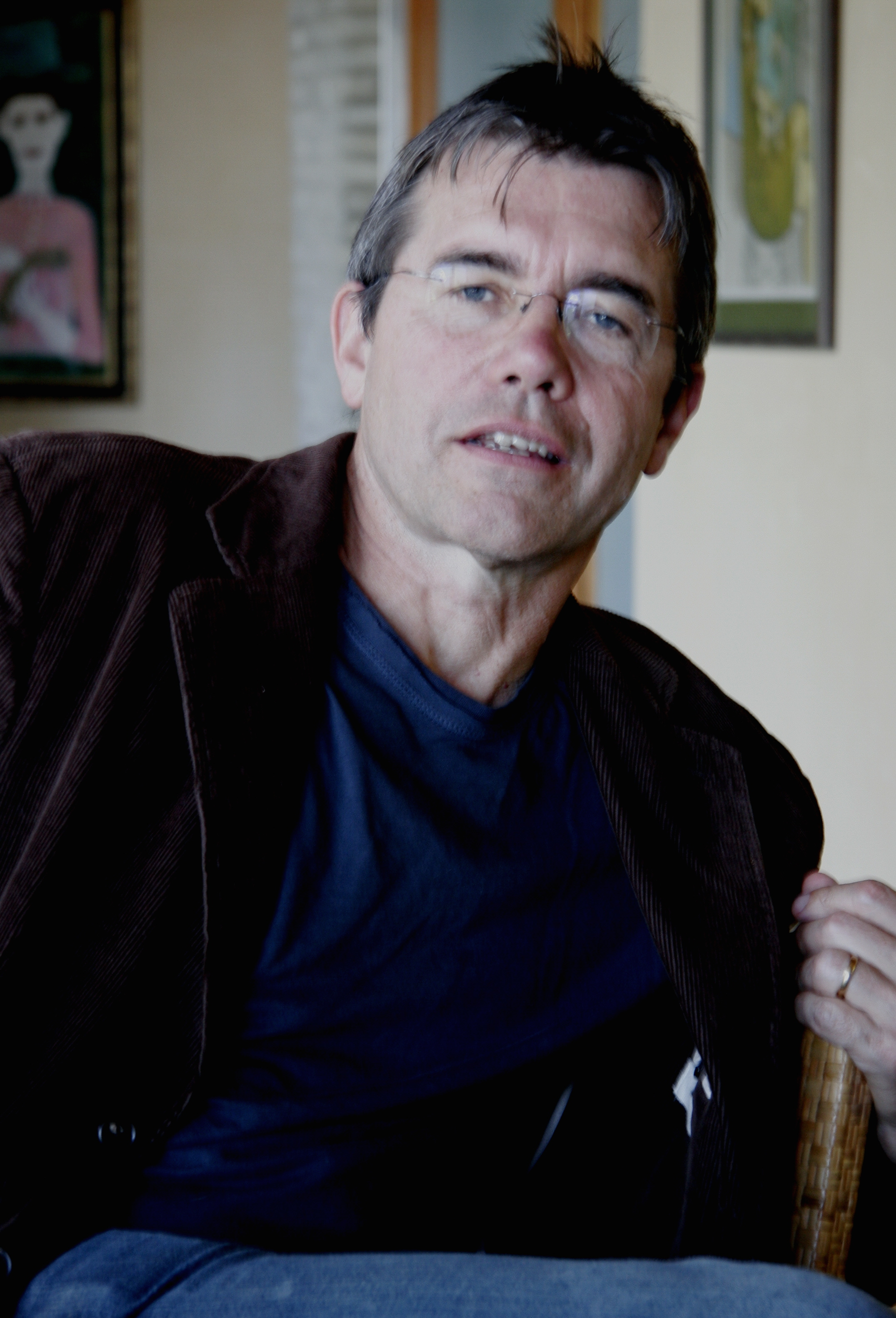
Stephen Gyllenhaal directed the 2016 winner So B. It

=== Golden Eagles ===
==== Best Narrative Feature ====
- 2022: Freedom's Path
- 2021: Queen of Glory (dir. Nana Mensah)
- 2020: Drunk Bus (dir. John Carlucci and Brandon LaGanke)
- 2019: The Steed (dir. Erdenebileg Ganbold)
- 2018: Tiger (dir. Alisteir Grierson)
- 2017: The Bachelors (dir. Kurt Voelker)
- 2016: So B. It (dir. Stephen Gyllenhaal)
- 2015: Diablo (dir. Lawrence Roeck)
- 2014: Where the Road Runs Out (dir. Rudolf Buitendach)

==== Best Documentary ====
- 2022: With This Breath I Fly
- 2021: Petite Maman (dir. Céline Sciamma)
- 2020: MLK/FBI
- 2019: Breaking Their Silence: Women on the Frontline of the Poaching War (dir. Kerry David)
- 2018: Stroop: Journey into the Rhino Horn War (dir. Susan Scott)
- 2017: The Last Animals (dir. Kate Brooks)
- 2016: Political Animals (dirs. Tracy Wares, Jonah Markowitz)
- 2015: India's Daughter (dir. Leslee Udwin)
- 2014: Waiting for Mamu (dir. Thomas A. Morgan)

==== Best Animation ====
- 2022: Tehura
- 2021: Freebird
- 2020: To: Gerard (dir. Taylor Meacham)
- 2019: Riptide
- 2018: The Driver is Red (dir. Randall Christopher)
- 2017: Green Light (dir. Seong-Min Kim)
- 2015: SOAR (dir. Alyce Tzue)
- 2014: The Dam Keeper (dir. Robert Kondo)

=== Kumeyaay Eagle Award ===
San Diego is in Kumeyaay Territory

for Best Native American Film

- 2022: The Wind & the Reckoning (dir. David L. Cunningham)
- 2021: Pictures of My People (dir. Mark Ruberg)
- 2020: Invasion: The Unist'ot'en's Fight for Sovereignty (dirs. Michael Toledano, Sam Vinal)
- 2019: Angelique's Isle (dir. Marie-Hélène Cousineau, Michelle Derosier)
- 2018: Indian Horse (dir. Stephen Campanelli)
- 2017: Waabooz (dir. Molly Katagiri)
- 2016: Te Ata (dir. Nathan Frankowski)
- 2015: For Blood (dir. Chadwick Pelletier, J.T. Connor)
- 2014: Sycuan: Our People. Our Culture. Our History.

=== Audience Awards ===
==== Best Documentary ====
- 2022: Holy Frit (dir. Justin Monroe)
- 2021: The Disruptors (dir. Stephanie Soechtig)
- 2020: The Mustangs: America's Wild Horses
- 2019: Breaking Their Silence: Women on the Frontline of the Poaching War (dir. Kerry David)
- 2018: Soufra (dir. Thomas A. Morgan)
- 2017: Resistance is Life (dir. Apo W. Bazidi)
- 2016: Seed: The Untold Story (dir. Taggart Siegel)
- 2015: Moments of Clarity (dir. Stev Elam)
- 2014: Waiting for Mamu
- 2011: The Highest Pass (dir. Jon Fitzgerald)
- 2010: Waiting for Superman (dir. Davis Guggenheim)
- 2009: Jesse's Story (dir. Mark S. Jacobs)
- 2008: Speed & Angels (dir. Peyton Wilson)
- 2006: The Creek Runs Red (dirs. B. Beesley, J. Brannum)
- 2005: "Little Man," (dir. Nicole Conn )

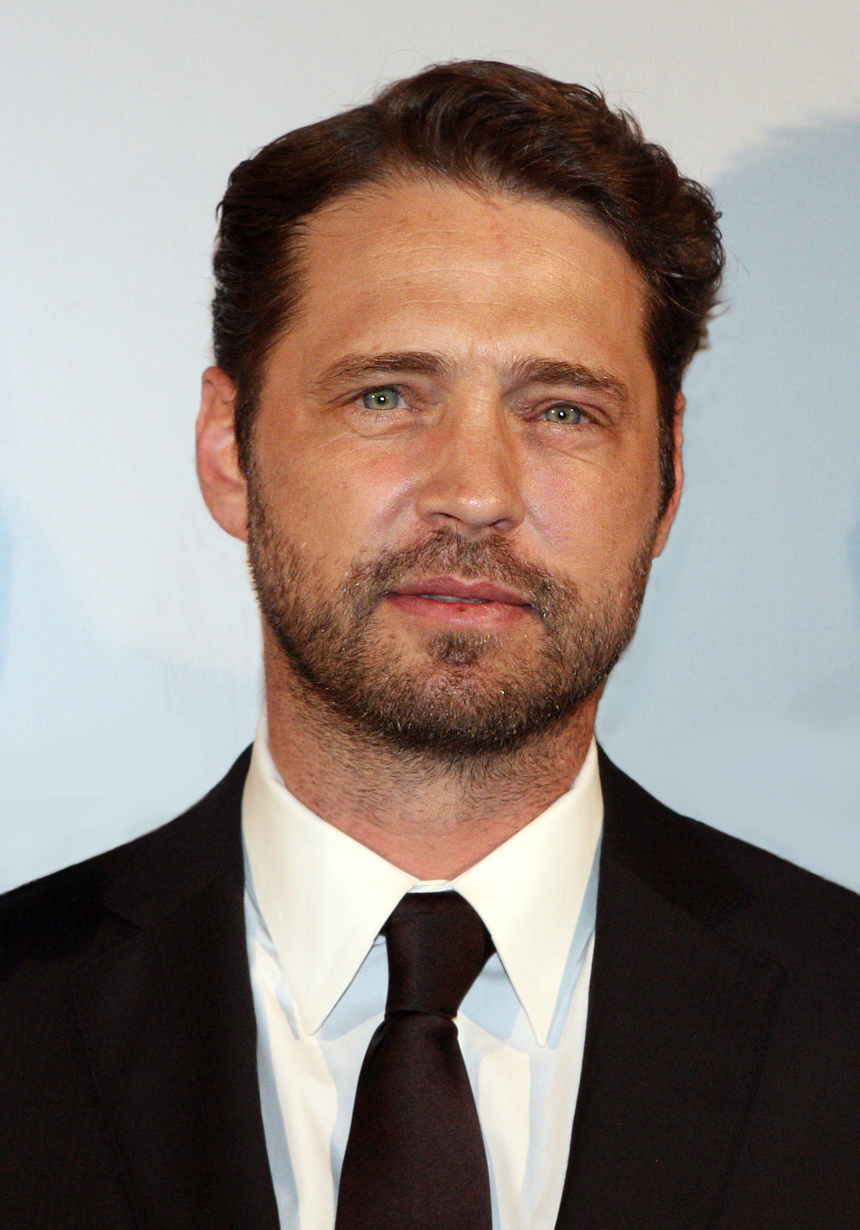
Jason Priestley directed the winner of the 2014 Audience Award for Best Narrative Feature

==== Best Narrative Feature ====
- 2022: The Wind & the Reckoning
- 2021: Somos Ecos (dir. Julian Diaz Velosa)
- 2020: Drunk Bus
- 2019: Carol of the Bells (dir. Joey Travolta)
- 2018: I May Regret
- 2017: Life Hack
- 2016: Dead Draw (dir. Brian Klemesrud)
- 2015: Moments of Clarity (dir. Stev Elam)
- 2014: Cas & Dylan (dir. Jason Priestley)
- 2013: Autumn Blood (dir. Markus Blunder)
- 2011: Like Crazy (dir. Drake Doremus)
- 2010: Nowhere Boy (dir. Sam Taylor-Johnston)
- 2009: Reach for Me (dir. LeVar Burton)
- 2008: The Last Lullaby (dir. Jeffrey Goodman)
- 2006: Neo Ned (dir. Van Fischer)
- 2005: The Matador (dir. Richard Shepard)

==== Best Narrative Short ====
- 2022: Moon
- 2021: Munkie (dir. Steven Chow)
- 2020: Feeling Through (dir. Doug Roland)
- 2019: Men of Vision
- 2018: Your Call Is Important To Us
- 2017: The Dog With the Woman (dir. P., S. Ledger-Lomas)
- 2016: Mine (dir. Simon Berry)
- 2015:The Gunfighter (dir. Eric Kissack)
- 2014: Sure Thing

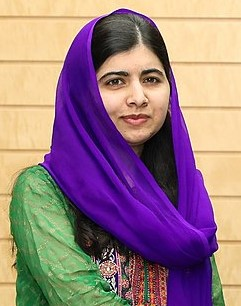
Malala Yousafzai starred in the Audience Choice for Best Documentary in 2015

==== Best Studio/Gala Film ====
- 2022: The Banshees of Inisherin (dir. Martin McDonagh)
- 2021: Belfast (dir. Kenneth Branagh)
- 2020: Nomadland (dir. Chloe Zhao)
- 2019: Marriage Story (dir. Noah Baumbach)
- 2018: Boy Erased (dir. Joel Edgerton)
- 2017: Three Billboards Outside Ebbing, Missouri (dir. Martin McDonagh)
- 2015: He Named Me Malala (dir. Davis Guggenheim)
- 2014: The Imitation Game (dir. Morten Tyldum)

=== Gregory Peck Award ===
- See Gregory Peck Award for Cinematic Excellence

=== Chris Brinker Award ===
For best first time director.

- 2020: Prarthana Mohan
- 2019: Ravin Gandhi
- 2018: Stare Yildirim
- 2017: Manny Rodriguez
- 2016: Anne Hamilton
- 2015: Jack Robbins
- 2014: John Hill

=== Cinema Vanguard Award ===
- 2024: Alessandro Nivola
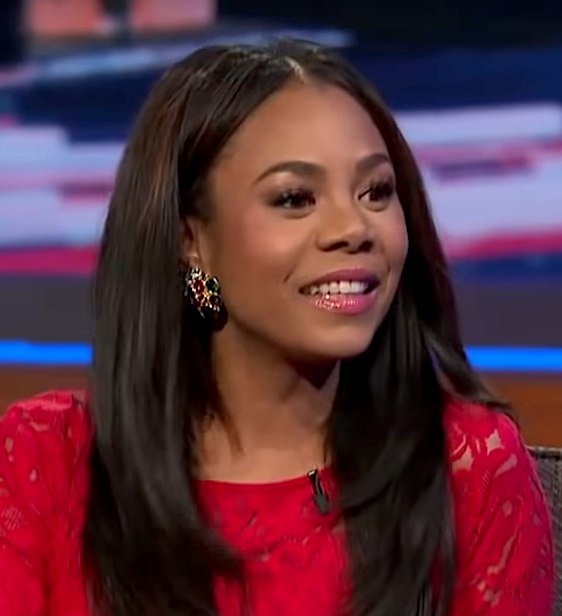
- Regina Hall will receive the Cinema Vanguard Award on October 20, 2022
  2022: Regina Hall
- 2019: Jared Harris
- 2018: Topher Grace
- 2016: Kate Beckinsale
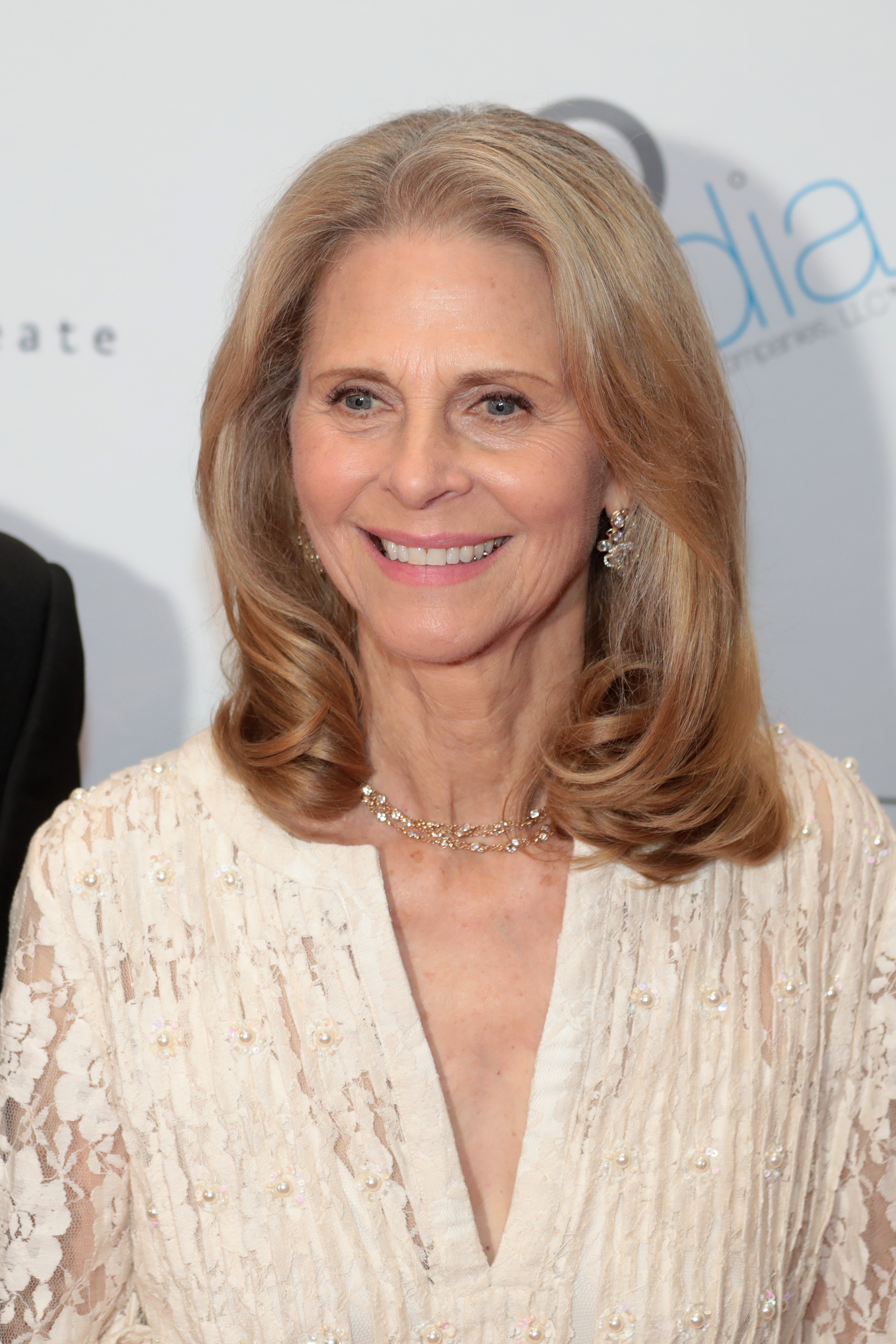
  Lindsay Wagner won the Humanitarian Award in 2019
- 2015: Adrien Brody
- 2014: Beau Bridges

=== Humanitarian Award ===
- 2024: Lhakpa Sherpa
- 2022: Dr. Brook Parker-Bello
- 2019: Lindsay Wagner
- 2018: Zachary Levi
- 2015: Geena Davis
- 2013: Muriel Hemingway
- 2005: Joaquin Phoenix

=== Fairbanks Award ===
- 2022: Tony Hale
- 2019: Jillian Bell
- 2018: Kathryn Hahn

=== Virtuoso Award ===
- 2024: Marianne Jean-Baptiste
- 2022: Lisa Ann-Walter
- 2017: Heather Graham
- 2014: Alison Pill

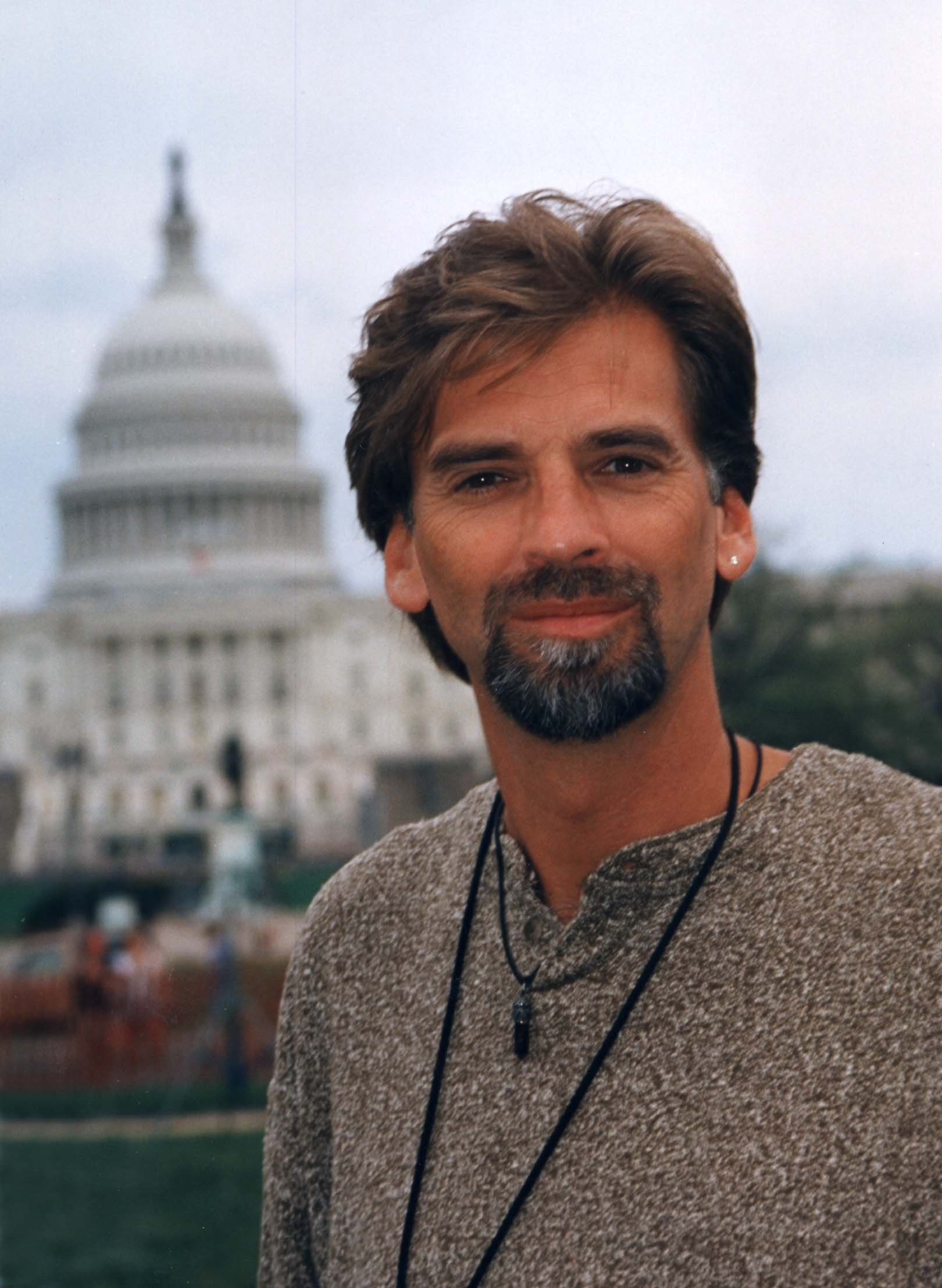
Kenny Loggins won the Music Icon Award in 2018

=== Auteur Award ===
- 2024: Amanda Righetti
- 2018: Alex Wolff
- 2017: Kumail Nanjiani
- 2016: Simon Helberg
- 2015: Brit Marling

=== Music Icon Award ===
- 2019: Pitbull
- 2018: Kenny Loggins

=== Spotlight Award ===
- 2022: Colson Baker
- 2018: John Cho

=== Rising Star Award ===
- 2019: Camila Morrone
- 2018: Christian Navarro
- 2017: Blake Jenner
- 2016: Jason Mitchell
- 2015: John Boyega
- 2007: Dominique Swain
- 2005: Colin Hanks (Soaring Star)
