= Gregory Peck Award =

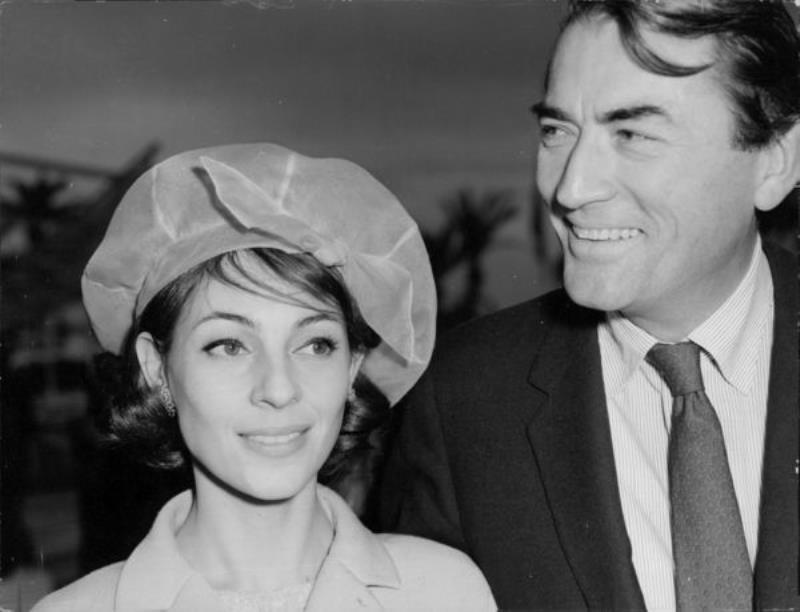
Veronique and Gregory Peck

The Gregory Peck Award for Cinematic Excellence is an award given at the San Diego International Film Festival (SDIFF) to honor the career achievement of a film actor, producer or director. It is named in memory of Hollywood actor Gregory Peck with the support of his family.

The award is SDIFF's most prestigious award and headlining presentation at their biggest formal event Variety's Night of the Stars.

== History ==
The award originated in 2008 at the Dingle International Film Festival (DIFF) in Ireland with the support and participation of Pecks' family, who chose Dingle because it is the ancestral home of the actor's great-grandmother Catherine Ashe who hailed from Annascaul in the Dingle Peninsula. Its original name was the "Gregory Peck Excellence in the Art of Film Award."

In 2014, the family began presenting the award in San Diego where the actor was born, raised his family and where he founded La Jolla Playhouse. Since the DIFF was forced to close due to financial reasons in 2019, the award is presented exclusively at SDIFF.

== Trophies ==
Winners in Dingle were awarded with a design based on "The Aglish Pillar" created by Irish Jeweller Brian de Staic. Winners in San Diego have received a "Golden Eagle Statuette" sculpted by Apache artist Ruben Chato.

== Honorees ==
Recipient	Photo	Date	Presented by	Venue	Notes	Ref
Viola Davis		October 13, 2026	Cecilia Peck	Conrad Prebys Performing Arts Center - La Jolla		
Mark Hamill		October 16, 2025	Carole Horst, Variety deputy editor	Conrad Prebys Performing Arts Center - La Jolla		
Penelope Ann Miller		October 17, 2024	Cecilia Peck	Conrad Prebys Performing Arts Center - La Jolla		
Andy Garcia		October 20, 2022	Cecilia Peck	Conrad Prebys Performing Arts Center - La Jolla		
Laurence Fishburne		October 18, 2019	Cecilia Peck	Pendry Hotel - Downtown San Diego		
Maurice Galway		June 29, 2019	Anthony Peck	The Phoenix Cinema - Dingle	Presented to the founder of the Dingle IFF upon the occasion of its closing.	
Keith Carradine		October 11, 2018	Cecilia Peck	Pendry Hotel - Downtown San Diego		
Patrick Stewart		October 5, 2017	Cecilia Peck	Pendry Hotel - Downtown San Diego		
Annette Bening		September 29, 2016	Anthony Peck	Museum of Contemporary Art - La Jolla		
The Peck Family		2016		Santa Barbara, California	Presented by DIFF and the Santa Barbara Sister City Board to commemorate Gregory Peck's centenary year.	
Alan Arkin		September 25, 2014		Museum of Contemporary Art - La Jolla		
Laura Dern		June 16, 2014	Jim Sheridan	The Blasket Centre, Dún Chaoin		
Jean-Jacques Beineix		March 18, 2011		The Phoenix Cinema - Dingle		
Stephen Frears		March 20, 2010		The Phoenix Cinema - Dingle		
Jim Sheridan		September 11, 2009	Anthony Peck	The Phoenix Cinema - Dingle		
Gabriel Byrne		2008	Veronique and Cecilia Peck (In attendance)	Dingle	"Gregory Peck Excellence in the Art of Film Award"	

== See also ==
- List of San Diego International Film Festival award winners
