= Tiger (2018 film) =

2018 American sports drama film

- Film poster
- Directed by: Alister Grierson
- Written by: Michael Pugliese; Prem Singh
- Produced by: Daniel Grodnik p.g.a. Deepak Singh
- Starring: Mickey Rourke; Janel Parrish; Prem Singh; Michael Pugliese
- Cinematography: Nathan Wilson
- Edited by: Ben Joss; Mark Warner
- Music by: Cezary Skubiszewski
- Production companies: R3M Productions; Running Tiger Films; Starrunner Entertainment
- Distributed by: R3M Pictures.
- Release dates: October 13, 2018 (San Diego); November 30, 2018
- Running time: 100 minutes
- Country: United States
- Language: English

Tiger is a 2018 American sports drama film directed by Alister Grierson, written by Michael Pugliese and Prem Singh, and produced by Daniel Grodnik based on the true story of former Ontario flyweight boxing champion Pardeep Singh Nagra, a Sikh who aspired to be a boxer only to be prevented from becoming one due to his refusal to shave his beard. The film stars Mickey Rourke, Janel Parrish, Prem Singh, and Michael Pugliese.

The film, which had its world premiere at the San Diego International Film Festival on October 13, 2018 where it won Best Feature Film. It was given a limited release in the United States and Canada by R3M Pictures on November 30, 2018 before rolling out to a nationwide release.

== Plot ==
Tiger is inspired by the true story of Pardeep Singh Nagra, a practicing Sikh man who was banned from the sport of boxing due to his religious beliefs. Pardeep fights back with the support of his coach and mentor (Mickey Rourke) and a community lawyer (Janel Parrish). Obstacles faced include racial profiling by public officials, overtly racist threats, jealous rival boxers and pressure to change from loved ones. It is within the course of these challenges, and at his weakest moment, that he discovers love (Janel Parrish). Consequently, his legacy will be forever tied to his two biggest battles; one in the courtroom, the other in the ring.

== Cast ==
- Mickey Rourke as Frank Donovan
- Janel Parrish as Charlotte
- Marshall Manesh as Kulwant
- Prem Singh as Pardeep Nagra
- Michael Pugliese as Bryan Doyle
- Jacob Grodnik as Barry Zaya
- Mike Dennis as Ian

== Production ==
Prem Singh and Michael Pugliese began writing the screenplay in 2010. After years of trying to get the film into production, it finally started to come together early 2015. Alister Grierson was attached in April 2015. Prem and Michael found out Mickey Rourke trained with Freddie Roach at Wild Card Boxing Club and took the next flight out. They waited for Mickey Rourke to leave the gym where they pitched him the project. He was later attached in September 2015. Janel Parrish was later attached in October 2015.

=== Filming ===
Principal photography began in Cincinnati and Hamilton, Ohio in November 2015.

The making of the film reportedly caused a lot of road closings in the Hamilton area. Filming also took place in Miami University Hamilton. Principal photography wrapped in December 2015.

== Music ==
Cezary Skubiszewski wrote and composed the original score with a full orchestra.

Manj Musik wrote the song "Punjabi Worldwide" for the film which features Fat Joe.

== Accolades ==
On October 14, 2018, Tiger won the "Best Feature Film" award at the San Diego International Film Festival.
