= Dingle International Film Festival =

Annual film festival in Dingle, Ireland

- Established: 2007
- Founded by: Maurice Galway
- Disestablished: 2019
- Awards: Gregory Peck Award

The Dingle International Film Festival (DIFF: Irish Gaelic: Féile Scannán Idirnáisiúnta an Daingin) was a film festival held annually in March that took place between 2007 and 2019 in Dingle, Ireland.

== History ==
Established in 2007 by Maurice Galway, the festival screened a number of films over the years, including the World Premiere of We'll Always Have Dingle, a documentary about Galway founding the festival. The film played in 2010 and again in 2011. Galway won the Gregory Peck award at the festival in 2019.

Notable guests have included inventor Garrett Brown, Gabriel Bryne, Laura Dern, Ned Dowd, Aidan Gillen, sound engineer Tom Johnson, Sarah Miles, Cillian Murphy, Barry Keoghan, Barbara Kopple, Maureen O Hara, Sir Alan Parker, Jack Reynor, Saoirse Ronan, Jim Sheridan and Scott Wilson.

=== Festival closing ===
The festival closed its doors for financial reasons in July 2019. The Animation Dingle Film Festival, an "offshoot" of DIFF, will continue. The 2020 presentations, scheduled for 20–21 March 2020, was cancelled due to COVID-19 but winners were announced via a live-stream awards announcement presented by JAM Media.

Since this iteration closed, a new team came together and continue the great tradition of film on the Dingle Peninsula. The new festival has run three very successful festivals and multiple events since 2022. Upcoming festival DFF Dingle Film Festival takes place in Dingle 13-15 November 2025. More info at festival website - dingelfilmfest.com

== Awards ==
=== The Gregory Peck Award for Excellence in the Art of Film ===
The family of iconic Hollywood actor Gregory Peck presented a career achievement award at the festival. Peck's great grandmother Catherine Ashe hailed from Annascaul in the Dingle Peninsula. Peck was a cousin to Thomas Ashe, founding member and battalion commander of the Irish Volunteers during the Easter Rising who later died in prison as the result of a hunger strike.

Notable recipients at Dingle IFF are Gabriel Byrne, Jim Sheridan, Jean Jacques Beineix, Stephen Frears and Laura Dern. In 2014, the Peck family began presenting the award at the San Diego International Film Festival in the actor's native hometown. Other recipients include Alan Arkin, Patrick Stewart, Annette Bening, Keith Carradine and Laurence Fishburne.

=== Animation awards ===
In 2015, the festival held an awards ceremony in association with Animation Ireland. Recipients of the Murakami Award have included Jimmy T. Murakami, Richie Baneham, Tomm Moore and Don Bluth and Gary Goldman.

== Non-competition events ==
The Irish Film Board has hosted a selection of critically acclaimed Irish films.

Classic films like Ryan's Daughter (1970) have opened the festival.
