= Somewhere Tonight (film) =

- Directed by: Michael Di Jiacomo
- Written by: Michael Di Jiacomo
- Produced by: Thomas J. Mangan IV; Gijs van de Westelaken; Bruce Weiss
- Starring: John Turturro
- Cinematography: Thomas Kist
- Edited by: Barry Alexander Brown
- Music by: Giulio Carmassi
- Release date: 8 July 2011 (Karlovy Vary)
- Running time: 85 minutes
- Countries: United States; Netherlands
- Language: English

Somewhere Tonight (also titled 1-900-Tonight) is a 2011 comedy-drama film starring John Turturro.

== Plot ==
Two lonely people, a "fortysomething virgin" man and a "homely sounding" woman agoraphobe, talk via a phone-sex service.

== Cast ==
- John Turturro as Leroy
- Katherine Borowitz as Patti
- Max Casella as Fred
- Elizabeth Marvel as Martha
- Lynn Cohen as Mrs. Pecorino

== Production ==
It is a "loose adaptation" of Theo van Gogh's 06, "based on a play (1994) by Johan Doesburg".

== Awards ==
Turturro won the Best Actor Award at the San Diego Film Festival for his performance in this film in 2011.

== See also ==
- 1-900 (film)
