= Ears, Open. Eyeballs, Click. =

Ears Open. Eyeballs, Click.
- Directed by: Canaan Brumley
- Produced by: Canaan Brumley
- Music by: John Stutzman
- Distributed by: Films Transit International Inc.
- Release date: 2005
- Running time: 95 minutes
- Country: United States
- Language: English

Ears, Open. Eyeballs, Click is a 2005 documentary film by Canaan Brumley, about the experiences of Marine recruits during bootcamp. Unlike many documentaries, this film offers no narration nor a focus on central characters, shooting from a fly-on-the-wall perspective. Despite this unusual approach, the film has received very positive reviews overall, especially from film festivals, such as the Los Angeles Film Festival and the San Diego Film Festival.

Brumley began shooting of the film with four cameramen, but only a few weeks into production, they quit. Brumley ended up shooting most of the film himself.

The film won the San Diego Filmmaker Award at the 2005 San Diego International Film Festival.

Brumley himself has handled distribution through DVD sales on his website. In addition, the film has been showing on the Documentary Channel.

== Content summary ==
The film is an observation of Platoon 1141, Company C, 1st Recruit Training Battalion, Marine Corps Recruit Depot San Diego, California. The film begins with the platoon's arrival at MCRD San Diego and continues to follow their journey, offering no narration and no central characters. The recruits are shown learning proper vernacular, learning drill, learning their rifles, and being confronted by their Drill Instructors. The film ends with Platoon 1141 graduating and earning the title of Marine, with the final scene showing new recruits making their phone calls to home upon arriving at boot camp.

== Explanation of title ==
During Marine Corps Recruit Training, recruits in formation are prohibited from turning their head or eyes away from their direct front, even when being addressed; when a Drill Instructor (DI) speaks to a recruit, that recruit is expected to stare forward if the DI is oblique to or behind him, and through him if the DI is directly to his front. When instructing recruits, a DI may command "Ears", to which the proper response for the recruits is "Open, sir!" If commanding them to look at him, the DI may command "Eyeballs", (or some other, less formal declaration, such as, "Look here" in any case the required response is the same) to which the recruits also have a formulaic response, in this case "Click." "Snap" is also common. The proper response is determined entirely by the will of the instructors, though it is almost always standardized through the company training.
