= The Last Lullaby =

- Directed by: Jeffrey Goodman
- Written by: Peter Biegen; Max Allan Collins
- Produced by: David Koplan
- Starring: Tom Sizemore; Sasha Alexander; Sprague Grayden; Randall Batinkoff; Bill Smitrovich
- Cinematography: Richard Rutowski
- Music by: Ben Lovett
- Distributed by: Chaillot Films
- Release date: March 28, 2008 (AFI Dallas International Film Festival)
- Running time: 93 minutes
- Country: United States
- Language: English
- Budget: $2,000,000

The Last Lullaby is a 2008 film noir starring Tom Sizemore, and Sasha Alexander. Filming took place in Shreveport, Louisiana.

The film won the Best Actress (Sasha Alexander) and Audience Award at the San Diego Film Festival in 2008.

== Plot ==
Price is an ex-hitman who retired to live the "easy life" only to find himself restless. He takes one final contract on Sarah, a small town library employee, only to fall in love with his target.

== Production ==
The film, an adaptation of the novel The Last Quarry by Max Allan Collins, was entirely shot in and around Shreveport. It was the director’s first feature film.

In an interview, Sizemore said that the film was one of the things he had done he liked best.

== Cast ==
- Tom Sizemore as Price
- Sasha Alexander as Sarah
- Bill Smitrovich as Martin
- Sprague Grayden as Jules
- Ray McKinnon as Ominous Figure
- Randall Batinkoff as Rick
- Jerry Hardin as Martin Lennox
- Smith Cho as Connie

== Reception ==
A review wrote: "As per its noir pedigree, The Last Lullaby peppers the tale with colorful characters and familiar faces (including excellent aging character actors like Bill Smitrovich and Jerry Hardin, doing yeoman’s work as those immoral top-of-the-food-chain characters deviously pulling their strings).”

Another review praised the lead actor and direction: ”Tom Sizemore as the lead carries the movie very effectively. Goodman give scenes time to build, allowing Sizemore’s fidgetiness, twitching and somber gaze to accentuate the character’s melancholy. ”
