= 9th AARP Movies for Grownups Awards =

Film award ceremony

- Date: February 15, 2010

Highlights
- Most nominations: It's Complicated (6)

The 9th AARP Movies for Grownups Awards, presented by AARP the Magazine, honored films released in 2009 made by people over the age of 50 and were announced on February 15, 2010. Robert De Niro was the winner of the annual Career Achievement Award, and LeVar Burton won the award for Breakthrough Achievement for his direction of Reach for Me.

== Awards ==
=== Winners and Nominees ===
Winners are listed first, highlighted in boldface, and indicated with a double dagger (‡).

**Best Movie for Grownups**: **Invictus**‡; Crazy Heart; Julie & Julia; Up; Up in the Air	**Best Director**: **Kathryn Bigelow – The Hurt Locker**‡; Lee Daniels - Precious: Based on the Novel 'Push' by Sapphire; Clint Eastwood - Invictus; Nora Ephron - Julie & Julia; Rob Marshall - Nine; Nancy Meyers - It's Complicated
**Best Actor**: **Jeff Bridges - Crazy Heart**‡; Daniel Day-Lewis - Nine; Robert De Niro - Everybody's Fine; Morgan Freeman - Invictus; Viggo Mortensen - The Road	**Best Actress**: **Helen Mirren - The Last Station**‡; Ellen Burstyn - Lovely, Still; Meryl Streep - It's Complicated; Meryl Streep - Julie & Julia
**Best Supporting Actor**: **Alec Baldwin - It's Complicated**‡; Eugene Levy - Taking Woodstock; Alfred Molina - An Education; Christopher Plummer - The Last Station; John Travolta - The Taking of Pelham 123	**Best Supporting Actress**: **Kim Basinger - The Burning Plain**‡; Judi Dench - Nine; Marcia Gay Harden - Whip It; Susan Sarandon - The Lovely Bones; Imelda Staunton - Taking Woodstock
**Best Comedy for Grownups**: **It's Complicated**‡; Away We Go; In the Loop; Pirate Radio; The Informant!	**Best Screenwriter**: **Nancy Meyers - It's Complicated**‡; Joel and Ethan Coen - A Serious Man; Nora Ephron - Julie & Julia; James Schamus - Taking Woodstock
**Best Buddy Picture**: **The Soloist**‡; The Damned United	**Best Intergenerational Film**: **Everybody's Fine**‡; The Blind Side; Taking Woodstock; Whip It
**Best Grownup Love Story**: **Meryl Streep and Stanley Tucci - Julie & Julia**‡; Helen Mirren and Christopher Plummer - The Last Station; Imelda Staunton and Henry Goodman - Taking Woodstock; Marcia Gay Harden and Daniel Stern - Whip It; Meryl Streep and Alec Baldwin - It's Complicated	**Best Movie for Grownups Who Refuse to Grow Up**: **Star Trek**‡; Coraline; The Princess and the Frog; The Fantastic Mr. Fox; Up
**Best Documentary**: **The Way We Get By**‡; Edie & Thea: A Very Long Engagement; Gotta Dance; The Philosopher Kings; Still Bill	**Best Foreign Film**: **Captain Abu Raed - Jordan**‡; The Beaches of Agnès - France and Germany; For My Father - Israel; O' Horten - Norway; Terribly Happy - Cinema of Denmark

=== Career Achievement Award ===
- Robert De Niro: "a film icon who has captivated audiences for decades with his stellar performances in films such as Taxi Driver, Raging Bull, Meet The Parents, and 2009’s Everybody's Fine."

=== Breakthrough Accomplishment ===
- LeVar Burton: "His first grownup theatrical film, the Emmy-winning actor tackles a story of love in a hospice facility. Guiding his stars Alfre Woodard and Seymour Cassel, he deftly avoids traps that could have led to maudlin sentimentality."

=== Films with multiple nominations and wins ===
Films that received multiple nominations
Nominations	Film
6	It's Complicated
5	Julie & Julia
5	Taking Woodstock
3	Invictus
3	The Last Station
3	Nine
3	Whip It
2	Crazy Heart
2	Everybody's Fine
2	Up

Films that received multiple awards
Wins	Film
3	It's Complicated
