= Peter Biegen =

American Writer

Peter Biegen is an American screenwriter, playwright and filmmaker. He co-wrote the screenplay The Last Lullaby (with Max Allan Collins) and wrote and directed the short film Ceremonies of the Horsemen (starring Richard Schiff and Josh Zuckerman). The short was selected to be part of the permanent archive at the Visual Center of Yad Vashem in Jerusalem.

Biegen has written for Lifetime television, ghost written on several projects, is a member of both the Writers Guild of America and the Writers Guild of Canada, and a 2014 fellow of the Sundance Institute. He was a writer on the 2017 series The Mist.

Biegen has developed film projects with Michael Apted, Rodrigo Garcia, Julie Lynn, Eric Stoltz and Don Was (among others).

Biegen is also an executive of Parrot Dice Pictures in Los Angeles, and was the host of the internet radio show "The Parrot Dice Pictures Radio Program" from 2009 through 2011.. His nonfiction work has been published in Cineaste, Bright Lights Film Journal, Chicago Story Press, PopMatters, Playbill, and other periodicals. In 2024 he was awarded a Monson Arts Residency for his writing, and was shortlisted for The Letter Review Prize in Nonfiction for his piece on the 2022 mass shooting in an LGBTQ+ nightclub in Colorado Springs.

Biegen's new biography of modernist photographer Paul Outerbridge, Jr. is under contract with Cornell University Press.
