= Reach for Me =

- Theatrical Release Poster
- Directed by: LeVar Burton
- Written by: Michael Adams
- Produced by: Charlene Blaine-Schulenburg; Hilary Carr; Mark A. Jones; Chan Mahon; Susan R. Rodgers; Mark Wolfe
- Starring: Seymour Cassel; Johnny Whitworth; Lacey Chabert; Adrienne Barbeau; Charlene Blaine-Schulenburg; Larry Hankin; LeVar Burton; Alfre Woodard
- Cinematography: Kriss Krosskove
- Edited by: Avril Beukes
- Music by: Julio Reyes; Copello
- Production company: AMediaVision Productions
- Distributed by: Brainstorm Media; Lost and Found Entertainment; Spotlight Pictures
- Release dates: October 2008 (Oldenburg Film Festival); December 18, 2009 (United States)
- Running time: 90 minutes
- Country: United States
- Language: English

Reach for Me is a 2008 American comedy-drama film directed by LeVar Burton. It won the AARP Movies for Grownups' Breakthrough Accomplishment award in 2010.

== Cast ==
The film's cast includes many award winners including Oscar Nominee Alfre Woodard and Golden Globe Nominee Adrienne Barbeau.

=== Cast list ===
- Seymour Cassel as Alvin
- Johnny Whitworth as Kevin
- Lacey Chabert as Sarah
- Adrienne Barbeau as Valerie
- Charlene Blaine-Schulenburg as Nell
- Larry Hankin as Elliot
- LeVar Burton as Nathanial
- Alfre Woodard as Evelyn

== Production ==
Reach for Me was the first 4K end-to-end production and the first feature film shot on the Dalsa Origin camera.

== Awards and festivals ==
9th AARP Movies for Grownups Awards, presented by AARP the Magazine
- Breakthrough Accomplishment

AARP’s ‘Movies for Grownups’ Film Festival (Las Vegas, Nevada)
- Special Feature

Lake Arrowhead Film Festival
- Best Feature
- Best of the Festival

San Diego Film Festival
- Audience Choice Award – Best Feature
- Seymour Cassel receives Indie Icon Award

Mill Valley Film Festival
- Official Selection
- Seymour Cassel is guest speaker of their prestigious ‘Insight’ Program

Downtown Film Festival Los Angeles
- Centerpiece Gala Selection
- Seymour Cassel receives The Hollywood Reporter Lifetime Achievement Award

Tallgrass Film Festival (Wichita, Kansas)
- Centerpiece Gala Selection
- Seymour Cassel receives Ad Astra Award

Off Plus Camera Film Festival (Kraków, Poland)
- Press Favorite
- Seymour Cassel receives Special Tribute

Oldenburg International Film Festival (Germany)
- World Premiere Gala Selection
- Seymour Cassel given star on their walk of fame
