= Pardeep Singh Nagra =

Indo-Canadian Sikh boxer

Personal information
- Nickname: The Tiger
- Born: 1970 (age 55–56)

Sport
- Sport: Boxing
- Weight class: Flyweight
- Coached by: Dewith Frazer

Pardeep Singh Nagra (born 1970) is a Sikh, Indo-Canadian former amateur boxer who competed from 1998 to 2001.

Nicknamed "The Tiger", Pardeep was known for his distinct appearance with his large beard and turban on his head. As a practising Sikh, he had completely uncut hair on his head and beard, which was the topic of much controversy throughout his career. A film was made in 2018, loosely based around his life named Tiger starring Prem Singh, Mickey Rourke, and Janel Parrish.

He was one of the first people to fight the beard ban in Canada in amateur boxing, and since winning that case in Canada, he worked in other countries such as England to help other bearded fighters to abolish the clean shaving rule. He helped to get the beard ban removed for current British professional boxer Inder Singh Bassi, who got the ban removed in 2018.

Nagra was also the former Ontario flyweight champion in 1999. Nagra served as a police officer in the Peel Regional Police after his boxing career, and later went on to work in the Toronto District School Board as the manager of employment equity.

== See also ==
- Boxing in Canada
- List of Canadian Sikhs
- Prohibitions in Sikhism
- Sikhism in Canada
