= The Steed =

2019 film

- Film poster
- Mongolian: Khiimori
- Directed by: Erdenebileg Ganbold
- Written by: Erdenebileg Ganbold; Huba Khuba
- Produced by: Trevor Morgan Doyle; Alexa Khan
- Starring: Erdenebileg Ganbold; Ariunbold E
- Cinematography: Baatar Batsukh
- Music by: Tumennast G.
- Production companies: Three Flames Pictures; Three Flames Pictures Mongolia; Heart of Hollywood Motion Pictures (in association with); Nomadia Pictures; Three Flames Pictures (primary)
- Release date: 5 January 2019
- Running time: 110 minutes
- Country: Mongolia
- Languages: Mongolian; Russian; Kazakh

The Steed is a 2019 Mongolian children's drama film directed by Erdenebileg Ganbold. It was selected as the Mongolian entry for the Best International Feature Film at the 92nd Academy Awards, but it was not nominated. It won the Best Feature Film award at the 2019 San Diego International Film Festival.

== Plot ==
As the Russian Revolution spills into Mongolia, a boy seeks to be reunited with his horse.

== Cast ==
- Erdenebileg Ganbold as Erdene
- Ariunbold E. as Chuluun (Boy)
- Enkhtuul G. as Mother
- Tserendagva Purevdorj as Morin Khuur Craftsman
- Mendbayar Dagvadorj as Morin Khuur Craftsman's Wife
- Vasiliy Mishchenko as Russian Farmer
- Aidos Bektemir as Kazakh Herdsman
- Nurlan Alimzhanov as Kazakh Herdsman's Son
- Tserenbold Tsegmid as Chief Gongor (as Tsegmed Tserenbold)
- Yalalt Namsrai as Baarai
- Todgerel Erdenetuya as Badarchin
- Altangerel G. as Horseman
- Purevdorj J. as Shaman
- Aleksandr Kalashnik as Russian Fugitive
- Oleg Naumov as Russian Soldier
- Akniet Belasar as Kazakh Daughter-in-Law (as Akniet Belarsarova)
- Erkhemjargal J. as Tsakhar
- Khuubaatar U. as Khuder
- Enkhsaikhan U. as Mongolian Lord

== See also ==
- List of submissions to the 92nd Academy Awards for Best International Feature Film
- List of Mongolian submissions for the Academy Award for Best International Feature Film
- List of films about horses

== Accolades ==
The Steed won the Golden Eagle for Best Feature Film at the 2019 San Diego International Film Festival and the Spirit of Cinema Award at the Oldenburg International Film Festival.
