= Kate Brooks =

American photojournalist

- Born: 1977 (age 48–49)
- Occupations: Filmmaker, Photojournalist
- Known for: Photography from the Middle East and Afghanistan
- Notable work: In the Light of Darkness The Boxing Girls of Kabul The Last Animals, documentary film (2017)

Kate Brooks (born 1977) is an American photojournalist who has covered the Middle East, Afghanistan, and Pakistan since the September 11 attacks.

== Biography ==
At age 20, while studying Russian and photography, Kate became actively involved in the plight of Russian orphans, starting a non-profit aid group to help the children at an institution outside of Moscow, while documenting their lives. The resulting photographs were published in Human Rights Watch's (HRW) report entitled "Abandoned by the State: Cruelty and Neglect in Russian Orphanages" and syndicated worldwide through Saba Press Photos. The campaign for orphans' rights galvanized global interest and raised funds to help orphaned children. She has worked as a freelance photojournalist ever since.

Immediately after the September 11 attacks, Brooks was ordered to move to Pakistan to photograph the impact of U.S. foreign policy on the region and life in post-Taliban Afghanistan. In 2003, she covered the American invasion of Iraq and the beginning of the insurgency for Time Magazine.

Since then, Brooks has continued to work across the region, photographing news and the impact of conflict on civilian populations, notably the Cedar Revolution, Pakistan earthquake, 2006 Lebanon war, Iraqi refugee exodus, clashes in Nahr al-Bared, Afghan elections, aftermath of Operation Cast Lead in Gaza, Swat Valley refugee crisis and protests in Tahrir Square.

Brooks has photographed military and political leaders such as former Pakistani President Pervez Musharraf for Time magazine, President Asif Ali Zardari for The New York Times Magazine, Afghan President Hamid Karzai for GQ and Time, General Stanley McChrystal for The Atlantic cover story by Robert Kaplan, King Abdullah II and Lebanese Prime Minister Saad Hariri.

Her photographs have also appeared in The New Yorker, Smithsonian, Newsweek, U.S. News & World Report, Vanity Fair Italy, and The Wall Street Journal

Brooks was a Knight-Wallace Fellow in Journalism in 2012–2013.

== Books ==
- No Woman's Land: On the Frontlines with Female Reporters (2012)
- In the Light of Darkness: A Photographer’s Journey After 9/11 (2011)

== Documentary films ==
- The Last Animals (2017) directed by Brooks was about man-caused mass animal extinction. The documentary premiered at Tribeca Film Festival where Brooks was awarded a Disruptor Award. For two years she campaigned for ivory and rhino horn bans while the film travelled the film festival circuit around the world. In 2018, The Last Animals won the Impact Award at Wildscreen in competition with Blue Planet II. In 2019 the film was broadcast globally by National Geographic, streamed on Hulu in the U.S and Netflix overseas.
- The Boxing Girls of Kabul (2011) directed by Ariel Nassar was about a group of young Afghan women dream of representing their country as boxers at the 2012 Olympics, embarking on a journey of both personal and political transformation. The film premiered at the International Documentary Film Awards in 2011, won a Canadian Screen Award and Inspirit Foundation Pluralism Prize. Brooks worked on the documentary as a contributing cinematographer and photographer.
- Kate Brooks was an Executive Producer on the documentary Tigre Gente (2021) that premiered at Tribeca Film Festival and broadcast on National Geographic in Latin America.

== Awards ==
- Photo District News 30 Under 30 2002
- TIME Pictures of the Year 2002
- TIME Picture of the Year 2005
- Picture of the Year International 2007
- World Press Photo Masterclass 2007
- International Photography Awards 2008
- Disruptor Award 2017
- Impact Award Wildscreen 2018
- Picture of the Year International 2020
