= Conrad Prebys Performing Arts Center =

Concert hall in La Jolla, California

- The Conrad
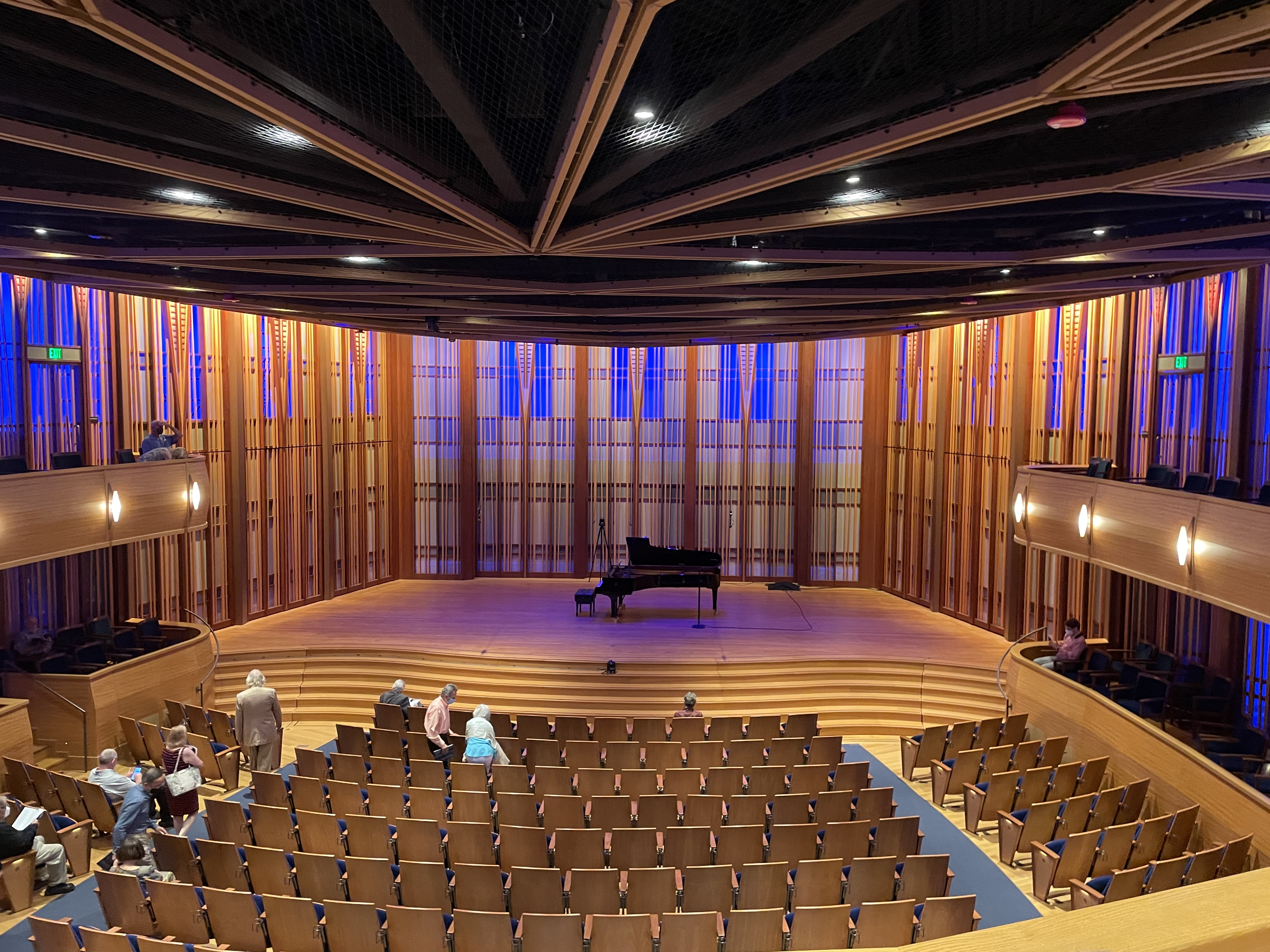
- Interior of the Baker-Baum Concert Hall
- Interactive map of Conrad Prebys Performing Arts Center
- Location: La Jolla, California
- Coordinates: 32.842180°N 117.274730°W
- Owner: La Jolla Music Society
- Capacity: 513 (Concert Hall); 116-300 (Recital Hall)
- Type: Concert hall
- Event: Music
- Public transit: MTS Gilman Transit Center

Construction
- Groundbreaking: February 1, 2017
- Opened: April 5, 2019
- Cost: $82 million
- Architect: Epstein Joslin Architects

Tenant
- La Jolla Music Society

Website
- Venue Website

The Conrad Prebys Performing Arts Center, also known as The Conrad, is a concert hall in La Jolla, a community of San Diego, California. It was opened in April 2019 and serves as the permanent residence of the La Jolla Music Society.

== History ==
Since 1986, the La Jolla Music Society (LJMS) rented the Sherwood Auditorium at the Museum of Contemporary Art San Diego throughout their concert seasons and well as their SummerFest. In 2012, the LJMS learned of the museum's plans to demolish Sherwood Auditorium. In May 2014, the LJMS purchased a 30,760-square-foot parcel of land worth $10 million in the Village of La Jolla using $50 million in funds from eleven donors including $15 million from Conrad Prebys. With increased funds, construction of The Conrad began on February 1, 2017. The opening concert on April 5, 2019, featured performances by Hilary Hahn, Jean-Yves Thibaudet, Jake Shimabukuro, Lil Buck, the Miró Quartet, Inon Barnatan, Heiichiro Ohyama, Cho-liang Lin, David Finckel, and Wu Han.

== Venue ==
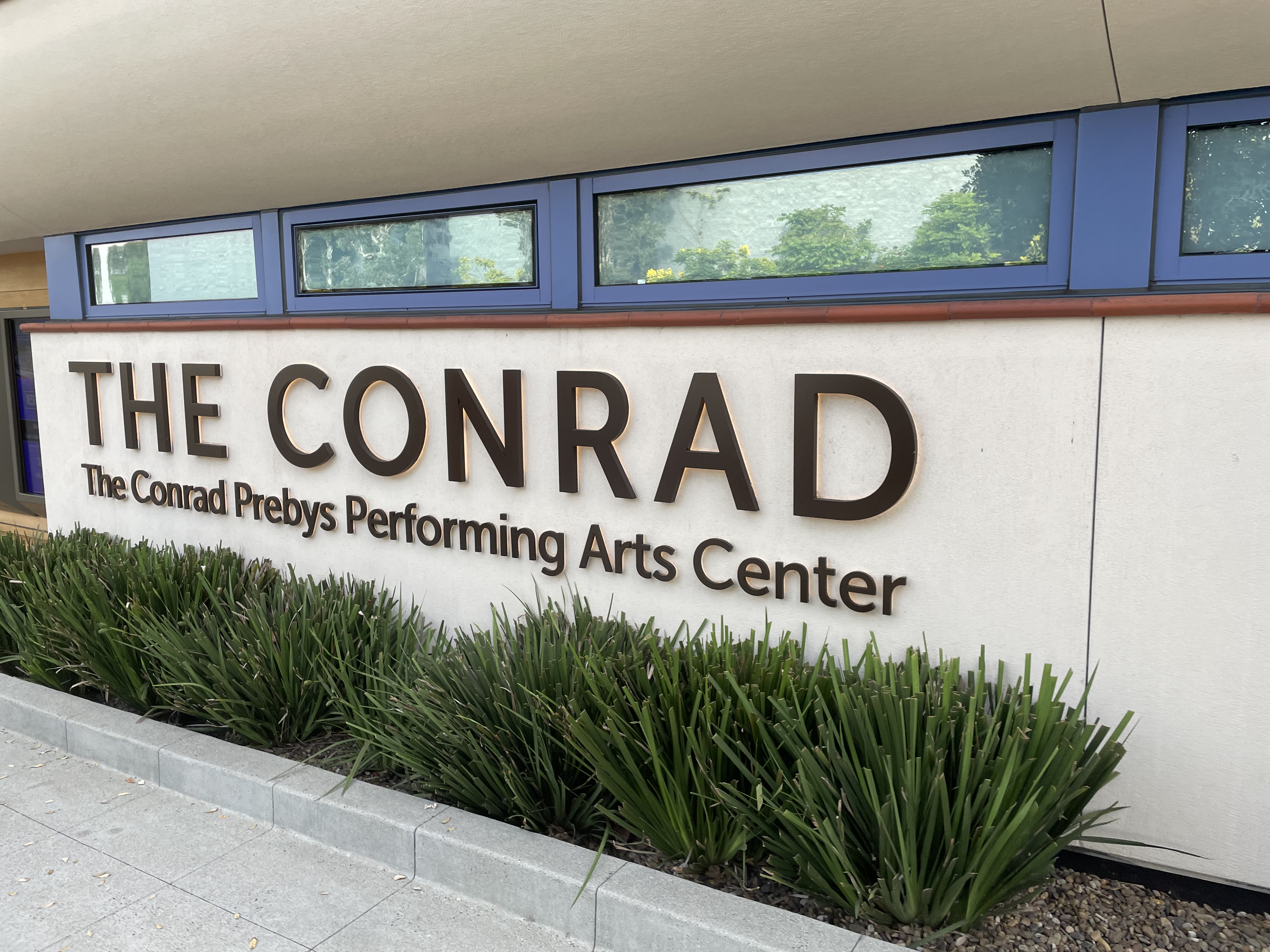
Exterior Logo

The Conrad was built and designed by New England–based Epstein Joslin Architects Inc. and the hall acoustics were managed by Yasuhisa Toyota, president of Nagata Acoustics. Underneath the complex is a $1 million dollar "bathtub" which collects rainwater to prevent flooding.

=== Baker-Baum Concert Hall ===
The concert hall is named after Brenda Baker and Steve Baum who gifted $10 million to the La Jolla Music Society. The hall has a capacity of 513 with oak, eucalyptus, and cedar woods and the stage has many customization options including a pit.

=== The JAI ===
The 140-seat theater is named after Joan and Irwin M. Jacobs who also gifted $10 million. If guests are seated at tables, the venue is estimated to have a capacity of 116 but if guests are left standing, the estimated capacity is around 300. The space is used primarily for jazz, experimental music, and other amplified performances.

== Special Events ==
=== The San Diego International Film Festival ===
The San Diego International Film Festival in October of 2026 held their 25th annual celebration. The Film Festival lasted from October 13th to the 18th. Their opening night celebration was located at the Conrad Prebys Performing Arts Center in La Jolla while featuring major red carpet arrivals and award ceremonies. The event had the opportunity to showcase 90 films from 22 countries, including The ceremonies recognized international achievements in cinema including independent films, documentaries, and premieres.
