= AARP Movies for Grownups Award for Best Screenwriter =

Annual US film award

- Awarded for: Best screenplay by a writer over 50
- Country: United States
- Presented by: AARP
- First award: David Hare for The Hours (2002)
- Currently held by: Paul Thomas Anderson for One Battle After Another (2025)
- Website: https://www.aarp.org/entertainment/movies-for-grownups/

The AARP Movies for Grownups Award for Best Screenwriter is one of the AARP Movies for Grownups Awards presented annually by the AARP. The award honors a screenwriter over the age of 50 who has written an outstanding supporting screenplay for a film produced in a given year. The award for Best Screenwriter was first given in 2003, when the awards expanded beyond their initial categories of Best Movie for Grownups, Best Director, Best Actor, Best Actress, Best Documentary, Best Foreign Film, and Best Movie for Grownups Who Refuse to Grow Up.

== Winners and Nominees ==
indicates the winners.

=== 2000s ===
Year	Film	Nominees
2002 (2nd)	The Hours	David Hare
2002 (2nd)	Gangs of New York	Jay Cocks
2002 (2nd)	The Quiet American	Christopher Hampton
2002 (2nd)	The Pianist	Ronald Harwood
2003 (3rd)	In America	Jim Sheridan
2003 (3rd)	Something's Gotta Give	Nancy Meyers
2003 (3rd)	Cold Mountain	Anthony Minghella
2003 (3rd)	Casa de los Babys	John Sayles
2004 (4th)	Spider-Man 2	Alvin Sargent
2004 (4th)	Bad Education	Pedro Almodóvar
2004 (4th)	Spanglish	James L. Brooks
2004 (4th)	Million Dollar Baby	Paul Haggis & F.X. Toole
2005 (5th)	Brokeback Mountain	Larry McMurtry & Diana Ossana
2005 (5th)	Bad Education.	Pedro Almodóvar
2005 (5th)	Crash	Paul Haggis
2005 (5th)	Broken Flowers	Jim Jarmusch
2005 (5th)	Yes	Sally Potter
2006 (6th)	Flags of Our Fathers	William Broyles Jr. & Paul Haggis
2006 (6th)	Boynton Beach Club	Susan Seidelman, David Cramer & Florence Seidelman
2006 (6th)	For Your Consideration	Christopher Guest & Eugene Levy
2006 (6th)	Keeping Mum	Richard Russo
2006 (6th)	Catch a Fire	Shawn Slovo
2007 (7th)	The Diving Bell and the Butterfly	Ronald Harwood
2007 (7th)	No Country for Old Men	Joel and Ethan Coen
2007 (7th)	In the Valley of Elah	Paul Haggis
2007 (7th)	Atonement	Christopher Hampton
2007 (7th)	American Gangster	Steven Zaillian
2008 (8th)	Changeling	J. Michael Straczynski
2008 (8th)	Vicky Cristina Barcelona	Woody Allen
2008 (8th)	Burn After Reading	Joel and Ethan Coen
2008 (8th)	The Curious Case of Benjamin Button	Eric Roth
2008 (8th)	Doubt	John Patrick Shanley
2009 (9th)	It's Complicated	Nancy Meyers
2009 (9th)	A Serious Man	Joel and Ethan Coen
2009 (9th)	Julie & Julia	Nora Ephron
2009 (9th)	Taking Woodstock	James Schamus

=== 2010s ===
Year	Film	Nominees
2010 (10th)	The Company Men	John Wells
2010 (10th)	True Grit	Joel and Ethan Coen
2010 (10th)	The Next Three Days	Paul Haggis
2010 (10th)	Another Year	Mike Leigh
2010 (10th)	The King's Speech	David Seidler
2011 (11th)	Midnight in Paris	Woody Allen
2011 (11th)	The Descendants	Alexander Payne
2011 (11th)	Extremely Loud and Incredibly Close	Eric Roth
2011 (11th)	A Better Life	Roger Simon
2011 (11th)	Moneyball	Steven Zaillian & Aaron Sorkin
2012 (12th)	The Sessions	Ben Lewin
2012 (12th)	Amour	Michael Haneke
2012 (12th)	Lincoln	Tony Kushner
2012 (12th)	Hyde Park on Hudson	Richard Nelson
2012 (12th)	Silver Linings Playbook	David O. Russell
2013 (13th)	Before Midnight	Richard Linklater with Julie Delpy and Ethan Hawke
2013 (13th)	Inside Llewyn Davis	Joel and Ethan Coen
2013 (13th)	About Time	Richard Curtis
2013 (13th)	Enough Said	Nicole Holofcener
2013 (13th)	American Hustle	David O. Russell & Eric Warren Singer
2014 (14th)	Wild	Nick Hornby & Cheryl Strayed
2014 (14th)	Birdman or (The Unexpected Virtue of Ignorance)	Alejandro González Iñárritu
2014 (14th)	Into the Woods	James Lapine
2014 (14th)	Boyhood	Richard Linklater
2014 (14th)	The Theory of Everything	Anthony McCarten
2015 (15th)	Joy	David O. Russell
2015 (15th)	Brooklyn	Nick Hornby
2015 (15th)	The Intern	Nancy Meyers
2015 (15th)	Love & Mercy	Oren Moverman & Michael Alan Lerner
2015 (15th)	Steve Jobs	Aaron Sorkin
2016 (16th)	Manchester by the Sea	Kenneth Lonergan
2016 (16th)	Julieta	Pedro Almodovar
2016 (16th)	Silence	Jay Cocks & Martin Scorsese
2016 (16th)	Fantastic Beasts and Where to Find Them	J.K. Rowling
2016 (16th)	Fences	August Wilson
2017 (17th)	Molly's Game	Aaron Sorkin
2017 (17th)	The Shape of Water	Guillermo del Toro
2017 (17th)	Call Me By Your Name	James Ivory
2017 (17th)	Darkest Hour	Anthony McCarten
2017 (17th)	I, Tonya	Steven Rogers
2018 (18th)	Can You Ever Forgive Me?	Nicole Holofcener & Jeff Whitty
2018 (18th)	Green Book	Peter Farrelly, Brian Hayes Curie & Nick Vallelonga
2018 (18th)	The Favourite	Deborah Davis & Tony McNamara
2018 (18th)	Ben Is Back	Peter Hedges
2018 (18th)	First Reformed	Paul Schrader
2019 (19th)	Marriage Story	Noah Baumbach
2019 (19th)	Harriet	Kasi Lemmons & Gregory Allen Howard
2019 (19th)	The Two Popes	Anthony McCarten
2019 (19th)	Once Upon a Time in Hollywood	Quentin Tarantino
2019 (19th)	The Irishman	Steven Zaillian

=== 2020s ===
Year	Film	Nominees
2020/21 (20th)	The Trial of the Chicago 7	Aaron Sorkin
2020/21 (20th)	Da 5 Bloods	Danny Bilson, Paul De Meo, Kevin Willmott, Spike Lee
2020/21 (20th)	Ma Rainey's Black Bottom	Ruben Santiago Hudson
2020/21 (20th)	News of the World	Paul Greengrass & Luke Davies
2020/21 (20th)	One Night in Miami...	Kemp Powers
2021 (21st)	West Side Story	Tony Kushner
2021 (21st)	Licorice Pizza	Paul Thomas Anderson
2021 (21st)	Belfast	Kenneth Branagh
2021 (21st)	The Power of the Dog	Jane Campion
2021 (21st)	Nightmare Alley	Guillermo del Toro & Kim Morgan
2022 (22nd)	Living	Kazuo Ishiguro
2022 (22nd)	TÁR	Todd Field
2022 (22nd)	The Fabelmans	Tony Kushner & Steven Spielberg
2022 (22nd)	She Said	Rebecca Lenkiewicz
2022 (22nd)	The Woman King	Dana Stevens
2023 (23rd)	Barbie	Noah Baumbach & Greta Gerwig
2023 (23rd)	The Holdovers	David Hemingson
2023 (23rd)	Poor Things	Tony McNamara
2023 (23rd)	Oppenheimer	Christopher Nolan
2023 (23rd)	Killers of the Flower Moon	Martin Scorsese & Eric Roth
2024 (24th)	Wicked	Winnie Holzman and Dana Fox
2024 (24th)	Emilia Pérez	Jacques Audiard, Thomas Bidegain & Nicolas Livecchi
2024 (24th)	A Complete Unknown	Jay Cocks & James Mangold
2024 (24th)	Conclave	Peter Straughan
2024 (24th)	Dune: Part Two	Denis Villeneuve & Jon Spaihts
2025 (25th)	One Battle After Another	Paul Thomas Anderson
2025 (25th)	Jay Kelly	Noah Baumbach & Emily Mortimer
2025 (25th)	Is This Thing On?	Bradley Cooper, Will Arnett & Mark Chappell
2025 (25th)	Downton Abbey: The Grand Finale	Julian Fellowes
2025 (25th)	Nuremberg	James Vanderbilt

== Writers with multiple nominations and wins ==
The following individuals received two or more Best Screenwriter awards:

Wins	Screenwriter	Nominations
2	Aaron Sorkin	4
2	Noah Baumbach	3

The following individuals received multiple Best Screenwriter nominations:

Nominations	Screenwriter
5	Ethan Coen
5	Joel Coen
5	Paul Haggis
4	Aaron Sorkin
3	Pedro Almodovar
3	Noah Baumbach
3	Tony Kushner
3	Anthony McCarten
3	Nancy Meyers
3	David O. Russell
3	Steven Zaillian
2	Woody Allen
2	Paul Thomas Anderson
2	Jay Cocks
2	Guillermo del Toro
2	Ronald Harwood
2	Nicole Holofcener
2	Nick Hornby
2	Richard Linklater
2	Eric Roth

== Age superlatives ==
Record	Screenwriter	Film	Age (in years)
Oldest winner	Alvin Sargent	Spider-Man 2	77
Oldest nominee	James Ivory	Call Me By Your Name	89
Youngest winner	Ethan Hawke	Before Midnight	44
Youngest nominee	Ethan Hawke	Before Midnight	44

== See also ==
- Academy Award for Best Original Screenplay
- Academy Award for Best Adapted Screenplay
- Academy Award for Best Story
- Golden Globe Award for Best Screenplay
- BAFTA Award for Best Original Screenplay
- BAFTA Award for Best Adapted Screenplay
- Independent Spirit Award for Best Screenplay
- Critics' Choice Movie Award for Best Screenplay
- Writers Guild of America Award for Best Original Screenplay
- Writers Guild of America Award for Best Adapted Screenplay
