= AARP Movies for Grownups Award for Best Buddy Picture =

Retired annual US film award

- Awarded for: Best film about friendship between people over 50
- Country: United States
- Presented by: AARP
- First award: 2008 (for films released during the 2007 film season)
- Currently held by: Finch (2021)
- Website: https://www.aarp.org/entertainment/movies-for-grownups/

The AARP Movies for Grownups Award for Best Buddy Picture is one of the AARP Movies for Grownups Awards presented annually by the AARP. The award honors the best film from a given year that is about friendship between people over the age of 50. The award for Best Buddy Picture was first given at the 7th AARP Movies for Grownups Awards. Other new awards that year were Best Supporting Actor and Best Supporting Actress.

No award for Best Buddy Picture was given for movies premiering in 2011, 2017, or 2018. In 2020, AARP listed five nominees for Best Buddy Picture from 2019, but did not award any of them.

== Winners and nominees ==
indicates the winners.

=== 2000s ===
Year	Film	Director(s)	Ref.
2007 (7th)	The Bucket List‡	Rob Reiner	
2008 (8th)	Tyler Perry's The Family that Preys‡	Tyler Perry	
2008 (8th)	Mamma Mia!	Phyllida Lloyd	
2008 (8th)	Soul Men	Malcolm D. Lee	
2008 (8th)	The Women	Diane English	
2009 (9th)	The Soloist‡	Joe Wright	
2009 (9th)	The Damned United	Tom Hooper	

=== 2010s ===
Year	Film	Director(s)	Ref.
2010 (10th)	Unstoppable‡	Tony Scott	
2011 (11th)	No award given	N/A	
2012 (12th)	Robot & Frank‡	Jake Schreier	
2013 (13th)	Last Vegas‡	John Turtletaub	
2014 (14th)	Land Ho!‡	Martha Stephens; Aaron Katz	
2015 (15th)	Learning to Drive‡	Isabel Coixet	
2015 (15th)	The 33	Patricia Riggen	
2015 (15th)	The Intern	Nancy Meyers	
2015 (15th)	A Walk in the Woods	Ken Kwapis	
2015 (15th)	Youth	Paolo Sorrentino	
2016 (16th)	Absolutely Fabulous: The Movie‡	Mandie Fletcher	
2016 (16th)	Fences	Denzel Washington	
2016 (16th)	Genius	Michael Grandage	
2016 (16th)	The Founder	John Lee Hancock	
2016 (16th)	The Nice Guys	Shane Black	
2017 (17th)	No award given	N/A	
2018 (18th)	No award given	N/A	
2019 (19th) (Note: In 2019 the AARP announced five nominees for Best Buddy Picture but did not identify a winner.)	A Beautiful Day in the Neighborhood	Marielle Heller	
2019 (19th)	Ford v Ferrari	James Mangold	
2019 (19th)	Just Mercy	Destin Daniel Cretton	
2019 (19th)	The Lighthouse	Robert Eggers	
2019 (19th)	The Two Popes	Fernando Meirelles	

=== 2020s ===
Year	Film	Director(s)	Ref.
2020/21 (20th)	Da 5 Bloods‡	Spike Lee	
2020/21 (20th)	Bad Boys for Life	Adil & Billal	
2020/21 (20th)	Bill & Ted Face the Music	Dean Parisot	
2020/21 (20th)	Let Them All Talk	Steven Soderbergh	
2020/21 (20th)	Standing Up, Falling Down	Matt Ratner	
2021 (21st)	Finch‡	Miguel Sapochnik	
2021 (21st)	12 Mighty Orphans	Ty Roberts	
2021 (21st)	The Harder They Fall	Jeymes Samuel	
2021 (21st)	Off the Rails	Jules Williamson	
2021 (21st)	Queen Bees	Michael Lembeck	
