= 15th AARP Movies for Grownups Awards =

Film award ceremony

- Announced on: January 5, 2016
- Presented on: February 8, 2016
- Site: Beverly Wilshire Hotel
- Hosted by: Kathy Griffin

Highlights
- Best Film: Spotlight
- Most awards: Joy (2)
- Most nominations: Joy (8)

The 15th AARP Movies for Grownups Awards, presented by AARP the Magazine, honored films released in 2015. Nominations were announced on December 11, 2015. The awards recognized films created by and about people over the age of 50. Winners were announced on January 5, 2016. The awards ceremony, held a month later on February 8, 2016, was hosted by actress and comedian Kathy Griffin at the Beverly Wilshire Hotel.

== Awards ==
=== Winners and Nominees ===
Winners are listed first, highlighted in boldface, and indicated with a double dagger (‡).

**Best Movie for Grownups**: **Spotlight**‡; Brooklyn; Joy; Love & Mercy; The Martian	**Best Director**: **Ridley Scott – The Martian**‡; Todd Haynes - Carol; Alejandro González Iñárritu - The Revenant; David O. Russell - Joy; Steven Spielberg - Bridge of Spies
**Best Actor**: **Bryan Cranston - Trumbo**‡; Michael Caine - Youth; Tom Courtenay - 45 Years; Johnny Depp - Black Mass; Ian McKellen - Mr. Holmes	**Best Actress**: **Lily Tomlin - Grandma**‡; Blythe Danner - I'll See You in My Dreams; Helen Mirren - Woman in Gold; Charlotte Rampling - 45 Years; Maggie Smith - The Lady in the Van
**Best Supporting Actor**: **Mark Rylance - Bridge of Spies**‡; Jeff Daniels - Steve Jobs; Robert De Niro - Joy; Michael Keaton - Spotlight; Sylvester Stallone - Creed	**Best Supporting Actress**: **Diane Ladd - Joy**‡; Joan Allen - Room; Jane Fonda - Youth; Helen Mirren - Trumbo; Cynthia Nixon - James White
**Best Comedy**: **The Intern**‡; 5 Flights Up; Danny Collins; Joy; The Second Best Exotic Marigold Hotel	**Best Screenwriter**: **David O. Russell - Joy**‡; Nick Hornby - Brooklyn; Nancy Meyers - The Intern; Oren Moverman and Michael Alan Lerner - Love & Mercy; Aaron Sorkin - Steve Jobs
**Best Time Capsule**: **Love & Mercy**‡; Carol; Joy; The Man from U.N.C.L.E.; Straight Outta Compton	**Best Intergenerational Film**: **Creed**‡; Grandma; The Intern; Straight Outta Compton; Woman in Gold
**Best Grownup Love Story**: **5 Flights Up**‡; 45 Years; Carol; Freeheld; I'll See You in My Dreams	**Best Buddy Picture**: **Learning to Drive**‡; The 33; The Intern; A Walk in the Woods; Youth
**Best Movie for Grownups Who Refuse to Grow Up**: **Inside Out**‡; Kingsman: The Secret Service; Paddington; The Peanuts Movie; Shaun the Sheep Movie	**Best Documentary**: **The Last Man on the Moon**‡; Best of Enemies; In Transit; Radical Grace; Very Semi-Serious
**Best Foreign Film**: **Rams - Iceland**‡; Mia Madre - Italy; The Salt of the Earth - Brazil; Tangerines - Estonia; Taxi - Iran	**Readers' Choice Poll**: Bridge of Spies; Brooklyn; Carol; Concussion; The Danish Girl; Inside Out; The Intern; Joy; Love & Mercy; The Martian; Room; The Second Best Exotic Marigold Hotel; Suffragette

=== Career Achievement Award ===
- Michael Douglas: "[F]rom his earliest days, beginning with the searing drama One Flew Over the Cuckoo's Nest, the two-time Oscar-winning actor/producer has challenged audiences to leave a movie theater with more than gum on their shoes."

=== Films with multiple nominations and awards ===
Films that received multiple nominations
Nominations	Film
8	Joy
5	The Intern
4	Carol
4	Love & Mercy
3	Bridge of Spies
3	Brooklyn
3	45 Years
3	The Martian
3	Youth
2	Creed
2	5 Flights Up
2	Grandma
2	I'll See You in My Dreams
2	Inside Out
2	Room
2	The Second Best Exotic Marigold Hotel
2	Spotlight
2	Steve Jobs
2	Straight Outta Compton
2	Trumbo
2	Woman in Gold

Films that received multiple awards
Wins	Film
2	Joy
