= AARP Movies for Grownups Award for Best Comedy =

Film award

- Awarded for: Best comedy film about or made by people above the age of 50
- Country: United States
- Presented by: AARP
- First award: 2006 (for films released during the 2005 film season)
- Final award: 2017
- Most recent winner: La La Land (2016)
- Website: https://www.aarp.org/entertainment/movies-for-grownups/

The AARP Movies for Grownups Award for Best Comedy was one of the AARP Movies for Grownups Awards presented annually by the AARP. The award honored the best comedy in a given year made by or featuring artists over the age of 50. The first award for Best Comedy was given to The Producers at AARP's first in-person awards ceremony in 2006.

In 2017, the AARP changed the category name to Best Comedy/Musical for just one year, discontinuing the award before the next year's ceremony.

== Winners and Nominees ==
indicates the winners.

=== 2000s ===
Year	Film	Director	Ref.
2005 (5th)	The Producers‡	Susan Stroman	
2005 (5th)	The Family Stone	Thomas Bezucha	
2005 (5th)	The 40-Year-Old Virgin	Judd Apatow	
2005 (5th)	In Her Shoes	Curtis Hanson	
2005 (5th)	Rumor Has It...	Rob Reiner	
2006 (6th)	Little Miss Sunshine‡	Jonathan Dayton; Valerie Faris	
2006 (6th)	Failure to Launch	Tom Dey	
2006 (6th)	For Your Consideration	Christopher Guest	
2006 (6th)	Keeping Mum	Niall Johnson	
2006 (6th)	Thank You for Smoking	Jason Reitman	
2007 (7th)	The Darjeeling Limited‡	Wes Anderson	
2007 (7th)	Dan in Real Life	Peter Hedges	
2007 (7th)	Death at a Funeral	Frank Oz	
2007 (7th)	Juno	Jason Reitman	
2007 (7th)	Wild Hogs	Walt Becker	
2008 (8th)	Ghost Town‡	David Koepp	
2008 (8th)	Smart People	Noam Murro	
2008 (8th)	What Just Happened	Barry Levinson	
2008 (8th)	Baby Mama	Michael McCullers	
2008 (8th)	Be Kind Rewind	Michael Gondry	
2009 (9th)	It's Complicated‡	Nancy Meyers	
2009 (9th)	Away We Go	Sam Mendes	
2009 (9th)	In the Loop	Armando Iannucci	
2009 (9th)	Pirate Radio	Richard Curtis	
2009 (9th)	The Informant!	Steven Soderbergh	

=== 2010s ===
Year	Film	Director	Ref.
2010 (10th)	City Island‡	Raymond De Felitta	
2010 (10th)	Date Night	Shawn Levy	
2010 (10th)	Flipped	Rob Reiner	
2010 (10th)	Red	Robert Schwentke	
2011 (11th)	The Artist‡	Michel Hazanavicius	
2011 (11th)	50/50	Jonathan Levine	
2011 (11th)	Bridesmaids	Paul Feig	
2011 (11th)	Midnight in Paris	Woody Allen	
2011 (11th)	Tower Heist	Brett Ratner	
2012 (12th)	Bernie‡	Richard Linklater	
2012 (12th)	The Best Exotic Marigold Hotel	John Madden	
2012 (12th)	Moonrise Kingdom	Wes Anderson	
2012 (12th)	The Oranges	Julian Farino	
2012 (12th)	Parental Guidance	Andy Fickman	
2013 (13th)	The Way Way Back‡	Nat Faxon; Jim Rash	
2013 (13th)	Don Jon	Joseph Gordon-Levitt	
2013 (13th)	Last Vegas	John Turtletaub	
2013 (13th)	Mental	P. J. Hogan	
2013 (13th)	The Secret Life of Walter Mitty	Ben Stiller	
2014 (14th)	Chef‡	Jon Favreau	
2014 (14th)	Land Ho!	Martha Stephens; Aaron Katz	
2014 (14th)	St. Vincent	Theodore Melfi	
2014 (14th)	This Is Where I Leave You	Shawn Levy	
2014 (14th)	Le Week-End	Roger Michell	
2015 (15th)	The Intern‡	Nancy Meyers	
2015 (15th)	5 Flights Up	Richard Loncraine	
2015 (15th)	Danny Collins	Dan Fogelman	
2015 (15th)	Joy	David O. Russell	
2015 (15th)	The Second Best Exotic Marigold Hotel	John Madden	
2016 (16th)	La La Land‡	Damien Chazelle	
2016 (16th)	Absolutely Fabulous: The Movie	Mandie Fletcher	
2016 (16th)	Florence Foster Jenkins	Stephen Frears	
2016 (16th)	Hello, My Name Is Doris	Michael Showalter	
2016 (16th)	My Big Fat Greek Wedding 2	Kirk Jones	
