= 12th AARP Movies for Grownups Awards =

Film award ceremony

- Date: February 4, 2013

Highlights
- Most awards: The Best Exotic Marigold Hotel, Flight, Lincoln (2)
- Most nominations: Lincoln (8)

The 12th AARP Movies for Grownups Awards, presented by AARP the Magazine, honored films released in 2012 and were announced on February 4, 2013. Susan Sarandon was the winner of the annual Career Achievement Award, and Dustin Hoffman won the award for Breakthrough Achievement for his first directorial effort, Quartet.

== Awards ==
=== Winners and Nominees ===
Winners are listed first, highlighted in boldface, and indicated with a double dagger (‡).

**Best Movie for Grownups**: **The Best Exotic Marigold Hotel**‡; Hitchcock; Lincoln; Les Misérables; The Sessions	**Best Director**: **Steven Spielberg – Lincoln**‡; Kathryn Bigelow - Zero Dark Thirty; Ang Lee - Life of Pi; David O. Russell - Silver Linings Playbook; Gus Van Sant - Promised Land
**Best Actor**: **Denzel Washington - Flight**‡; Daniel Day-Lewis - Lincoln; John Hawkes - The Sessions; Anthony Hopkins - Hitchcock; Jean-Louis Trintignant - Amour	**Best Actress**: **Judi Dench - The Best Exotic Marigold Hotel**‡; Ann Dowd - Compliance; Helen Mirren - Hitchcock; Emmanuelle Riva - Amour; Meryl Streep - Hope Springs
**Best Supporting Actor**: **John Goodman - Flight**‡; Tom Cruise - Rock of Ages; Robert De Niro - Silver Linings Playbook; Tommy Lee Jones - Lincoln; Tom Wilkinson - The Best Exotic Marigold Hotel	**Best Supporting Actress**: **Jacki Weaver - Silver Linings Playbook**‡; Sally Field - Lincoln; Catherine Keener - A Late Quartet; Shirley MacLaine - Bernie; Frances McDormand - Promised Land
**Best Comedy**: **Bernie**‡; The Best Exotic Marigold Hotel; Moonrise Kingdom; The Oranges; Parental Guidance	**Best Screenwriter**: **Ben Lewin - The Sessions**‡; Michael Haneke - Amour; Tony Kushner - Lincoln; Richard Nelson - Hyde Park on Hudson; David O. Russell - Silver Linings Playbook
**Best Time Capsule**: **Argo**‡; Hitchcock; Hyde Park on Hudson	**Best Intergenerational Film**: **Silver Linings Playbook**‡; Moonrise Kingdom; Parental Guidance; Starlet; Trouble with the Curve
**Best Grownup Love Story**: **Hitchcock**‡; The Best Exotic Marigold Hotel; Hope Springs; Lincoln; Quartet	**Best Buddy Picture**: **Robot and Frank**‡
**Best Movie for Grownups Who Refuse to Grow Up**: **Moonrise Kingdom**‡; The Hobbit: An Unexpected Journey; Mirror Mirror; The Three Stooges; Wreck-It Ralph	**Best Documentary**: **Searching for Sugar Man**‡; Betting the Farm; Charles Bradley: Soul of America; How to Survive a Plague; Surviving Hitler: A Love Story
**Best Foreign Film**: **Amour - France**‡	**Readers' Choice**: **Lincoln**‡; Amour; Argo; The Best Exotic Marigold Hotel; Hitchcock; Les Misérables; Quartet; The Sessions; Silver Linings Playbook; Zero Dark Thirty

=== Career Achievement Award ===
- Susan Sarandon

=== Breakthrough Accomplishment ===
- Dustin Hoffman: "Hoffman doesn't just cut his cast loose [in Quartet, his directorial debut]; he guides them through a minefield of possible missteps to create a film bursting with sentiment, yet stubbornly dry-eyed."

=== Films with multiple nominations and awards ===
Films that received multiple nominations
Nominations	Film
8	Lincoln
6	The Best Exotic Marigold Hotel
6	Hitchcock
6	Silver Linings Playbook
4	Amour
4	The Sessions
3	Moonrise Kingdom
3	Quartet
2	Argo
2	Bernie
2	Flight
2	Hope Springs
2	Hyde Park on Hudson
2	Parental Guidance
2	Promised Land
2	Zero Dark Thirty

Films that received multiple awards
Wins	Film
2	The Best Exotic Marigold Hotel
2	Flight
2	Lincoln
