= 10th AARP Movies for Grownups Awards =

Film award ceremony

- Date: February 7, 2011
- Hosted by: Dana Delany & Peter Gallagher

Highlights
- Most nominations: The Kids Are All Right (5)

The 10th AARP Movies for Grownups Awards, presented by AARP the Magazine, honored films released in 2010 made by people over the age of 50 and were announced on January 14, 2011. The ceremony was hosted by actors Dana Delany and Peter Gallagher on February 7, 2011 at the Beverly Wilshire Hotel in Los Angeles. Robert Redford was the winner of the annual Career Achievement Award, and Helen Mirren won the award for Breakthrough Achievement for her performance in Red.

== Awards ==
=== Winners and Nominees ===
Winners are listed first, highlighted in boldface, and indicated with a double dagger (‡).

**Best Movie for Grownups**: **The King's Speech**‡; Another Year; Casino Jack; City Island; The Company Men; Get Low; The Kids Are All Right; Letters to Juliet; Red; Secretariat	**Best Director**: **Danny Boyle – 127 Hours**‡; Paul Greengrass - Green Zone; Paul Haggis - The Next Three Days; Tony Scott - Unstoppable; John Wells - The Company Men
**Best Actor**: **Colin Firth - The King's Speech**‡; Michael Caine - Harry Brown; Michael Douglas - Solitary Man; Robert Duvall - Get Low; Kevin Spacey - Casino Jack	**Best Actress**: **Lesley Manville - Another Year**‡; Annette Bening - The Kids Are All Right; Julianne Moore - The Kids Are All Right; Vanessa Redgrave - Letters to Juliet; Tilda Swinton - I Am Love
**Best Supporting Actor**: **John Malkovich - Secretariat**‡; Geoffrey Rush - The King's Speech; Kevin Costner - The Company Men; Bill Murray - Get Low; Ben Kingsley - Shutter Island	**Best Supporting Actress**: **Phylicia Rashad - For Colored Girls**‡; Sissy Spacek - Get Low; Diane Keaton - Morning Glory; Melissa Leo - The Fighter; Gemma Jones - You Will Meet a Tall Dark Stranger
**Best Comedy**: **City Island**‡; Date Night; Flipped; Red	**Best Screenwriter**: **John Wells - The Company Men**‡; Joel and Ethan Coen - True Grit; Paul Haggis - The Next Three Days; Mike Leigh - Another Year; David Seidler - The King's Speech
**Best Buddy Picture**: **Unstoppable**‡	**Best Intergenerational Film**: **Flipped**‡; The Karate Kid; The Kids Are All Right; That Evening Sun; Touching Home
**Best Grownup Love Story**: **Annette Bening and Julianne Moore - The Kids Are All Right**‡; Blythe Danner and Richard Dreyfuss - The Lightkeepers; Julianna Margulies and Andy Garcia - City Island; Ruth Sheen and Jim Broadbent - Another Year; Naomi Watts and Sean Penn - Fair Game	**Best Movie for Grownups Who Refuse to Grow Up**: **The Karate Kid**‡; Alice in Wonderland; Diary of a Wimpy Kid; How to Train Your Dragon; Toy Story 3
**Best Documentary**: **Waste Land**‡; Client 9: The Rise and Fall of Eliot Spitzer; Joan Rivers: A Piece of Work; Waiting for "Superman"; Marwencol	**Best Foreign Film**: **Farewell - France**‡; A Film Unfinished - Israel and Germany; The First Beautiful Thing - Italy; Mother - South Korea; Peepli Live - India
**Readers' Choice**: **The King's Speech**‡; Another Year; Casino Jack; City Island; The Company Men; Get Low; The Kids Are All Right; Letters to Juliet; Red; Secretariat

=== Career Achievement Award ===
- Robert Redford: "a film icon who has captivated audiences for decades with stellar performances in countless films including The Way We Were, All the President's Men and The Natural, and Oscar-winning directing in Ordinary People."

=== Breakthrough Accomplishment ===
- Helen Mirren: "The First Lady of the Cinema, playing a spy forced out of retirement, kicks a heap of bad-guy butt. Best moment: at the trigger of a machine gun the size of a Buick."

=== Films with multiple nominations and wins ===
Films that received multiple nominations
Nominations	Film
5	The Kids Are All Right
4	Another Year
4	The Company Men
4	Get Low
4	The King's Speech
3	City Island
2	Casino Jack
2	Flipped
2	The Karate Kid
2	Letters to Juliet
2	The Next Three Days
2	Red
2	Secretariat
2	Unstoppable

Films that received multiple awards
Wins	Film
3	The King's Speech
