= 7th AARP Movies for Grownups Awards =

Film award ceremony

- Date: February 4, 2008
- Hosted by: Jamie Lee Curtis and John Cleese

Highlights
- Most nominations: Mamma Mia! (5)

The 7th AARP Movies for Grownups Awards, presented by AARP the Magazine, honored films released in 2007 made by people over the age of 50. The ceremony was held on February 4, 2008 at the Bel Air Hotel in Los Angeles, and was hosted by actors Jamie Lee Curtis and John Cleese. Hal Holbrook won the annual Career Achievement Award, and Gena Rowlands won the award for Breakthrough Achievement for her writing in Paris, je t'aime.

Three new awards debuted at this year's ceremony, honoring the best supporting actor, best supporting actress, and best buddy picture of the year.

== Awards ==
=== Winners and Nominees ===
Winners are listed first, highlighted in boldface, and indicated with a double dagger (‡).

**Best Movie for Grownups**: **The Savages**‡; Atonement; The Bucket List; The Kite Runner; Michael Clayton	**Best Director**: **Tony Gilroy – Michael Clayton**‡; Joel and Ethan Coen - No Country for Old Men; Paul Haggis - In the Valley of Elah; Mike Nichols - Charlie Wilson's War; Julian Schnabel - The Diving Bell and the Butterfly
**Best Actor**: **Chris Cooper - Breach**‡; Richard Gere - The Hoax; Tom Hanks - Charlie Wilson's War; Tommy Lee Jones - In the Valley of Elah; Denzel Washington - American Gangster	**Best Actress**: **Julie Christie - Away from Her**‡; Sally Field - Two Weeks; Vanessa Redgrave - Evening; Meryl Streep - Lions for Lambs
**Best Supporting Actor**: **Tom Wilkinson - Michael Clayton**‡; Philip Bosco - The Savages; Homayoun Ershadi - The Kite Runner; Andy Griffith - Waitress; Hal Holbrook - Into the Wild	**Best Supporting Actress**: **Ruby Dee - American Gangster** ‡; Jane Asher - Death at a Funeral; Olympia Dukakis - Away from Her; Fernanda Montenegro - Love in the Time of Cholera; Vanessa Redgrave - Atonement
**Best Comedy for Grownups**: **The Darjeeling Limited**‡; Dan in Real Life; Death at a Funeral; Juno; Wild Hogs	**Best Screenwriter**: **Ronald Harwood - The Diving Bell and the Butterfly**‡; Joel and Ethan Coen - No Country for Old Men; Paul Haggis - In the Valley of Elah; Christopher Hampton - Atonement; Steven Zaillian - American Gangster
**Best Buddy Picture**: **The Bucket List**‡	**Best Intergenerational Film**: **The Namesake**‡; The Great Debaters; 3:10 to Yuma; The Savages; Juno
**Best Grownup Love Story**: **John Travolta and Christopher Walken - Hairspray**‡	**Best Movie for Grownups Who Refuse to Grow Up**: **Enchanted**‡; Ratatouille; Mr. Bean's Holiday; Knocked Up; The Simpsons Movie
**Best Documentary**: **In the Shadow of the Moon**‡ (tie); **Sicko**‡ (tie); For the Bible Tells Me So; Hear and Now; Run, Granny, Run	**Best Foreign Film**: **My Best Friend - France**‡; After the Wedding - Denmark; Vitus - Switzerland; La Vie en rose - France; Persepolis - France

=== Career Achievement Award ===
- Hal Holbrook: "'This is one of the greatest moments of my life!' the veteran star said, ranking it right up there with his Oscar nomination that year — his first — for Into the Wild."

=== Breakthrough Accomplishment ===
- Gena Rowlands: "Rowlands, who'd never written a screenplay in her life, sat down and created an exquisite scene, the story of a long-married couple on the eve of their divorce. Sparely written and wonderfully realized by director Gerard Depardieu, the scene creates in the viewer the discomfort of overhearing a too private conversation in too public a place."

=== Films with multiple nominations and wins ===
Films that received multiple nominations
Nominations	Film
3	American Gangster
3	Atonement
3	In the Valley of Elah
3	Michael Clayton
3	The Savages
2	Away from Her
2	The Bucket List
2	Charlie Wilson's War
2	Death at a Funeral
2	The Diving Bell and the Butterfly
2	Juno
2	The Kite Runner
2	No Country for Old Men

Films that received multiple awards
Wins	Film
2	Michael Clayton
