= 13th AARP Movies for Grownups Awards =

Film award ceremony

- Announced on: January 9, 2014
- Presented on: February 10, 2014
- Hosted by: Kathy Griffin

Highlights
- Best Movie for Grownups: 12 Years a Slave
- Most awards: Nebraska (2)
- Most nominations: Enough Said, Lee Daniels' The Butler, Nebraska, Philomena, The Way, Way Back (4)

The 13th AARP Movies for Grownups Awards, presented by AARP the Magazine, honored films released in 2013 and were announced on January 9, 2014. The awards recognized films created by and about people over the age of 50. The ceremony, held a month later on February 10, 2014, was hosted by actress and comedian Kathy Griffin.

== Awards ==
=== Winners and nominees ===
Winners are listed first, highlighted in boldface, and indicated with a double dagger (‡).

**Best Movie for Grownups**: **12 Years a Slave**‡; All Is Lost; Captain Phillips; Nebraska; Philomena; Saving Mr. Banks	**Best Director**: **Alfonso Cuarón – Gravity**‡; J. C. Chandor - All Is Lost; Paul Greengrass - Captain Phillips; Nicole Holofcener - Enough Said; Stephen Frears - Philomena
**Best Actor**: **Bruce Dern - Nebraska**‡; Tom Hanks - Captain Phillips; Brad Pitt - World War Z; Robert Redford - All Is Lost; Forest Whitaker - Lee Daniels' The Butler	**Best Actress**: **Judi Dench - Philomena**‡; Julia Louis-Dreyfus - Enough Said; Paulina García - Gloria; Meryl Streep - August: Osage County; Emma Thompson - Saving Mr. Banks
**Best Supporting Actor**: **Chris Cooper - August: Osage County**‡; Steve Carell - The Way, Way Back; Tony Danza - Don Jon; John Goodman - Inside Llewyn Davis; Bill Nighy - About Time	**Best Supporting Actress**: **Oprah Winfrey - Lee Daniels' The Butler**‡; Allison Janney - The Way, Way Back; Margo Martindale - August: Osage County; Julianne Moore - Don Jon; June Squibb - Nebraska
**Best Comedy**: **The Way, Way Back**‡; Don Jon; Last Vegas; Mental; The Secret Life of Walter Mitty	**Best Screenwriter**: **Richard Linklater with Julie Delpy and Ethan Hawke - Before Midnight**‡; Joel and Ethan Coen - Inside Llewyn Davis; Richard Curtis - About Time; Nicole Holofcener - Enough Said; David O. Russell and Eric Singer - American Hustle
**Best Time Capsule**: **American Hustle**‡; Lee Daniels' The Butler; Dallas Buyers Club; Inside Llewyn Davis; The Wolf of Wall Street	**Best Intergenerational Film**: **Nebraska**‡; Bless Me, Ultima; The Book Thief; Philomena; The Way, Way Back
**Best Grownup Love Story**: **Enough Said**‡; Before Midnight; Lee Daniels' The Butler; Still Mine; Unfinished Song	**Best Buddy Picture**: **Last Vegas**‡
**Best Movie for Grownups Who Refuse to Grow Up**: **Saving Mr. Banks**‡; Cloudy with a Chance of Meatballs; Frozen; The Lone Ranger	**Best Documentary**: **20 Feet from Stardom**‡; Herb & Dorothy: 50x50; Muscle Shoals; Running from Crazy; Running Wild: The Life of Dayton O. Hyde
**Best Foreign Film**: **Renoir - France**‡; The Act of Killing - Denmark; Child's Pose - Romania; Gloria - Chile; Hannah Arendt - Germany, Luxembourg, Cinema of France	

=== Career Achievement Award ===
- Susan Sarandon

=== Breakthrough Accomplishment ===
- Mary Steenburgen: "She's already won an Oscar and is one of TV's most welcome faces; now, for her role as an aspiring Vegas lounge singer, Steenburgen, 60, reveals herself to be a first-rate vocalist (and she even wrote her own song)."

=== Films with multiple nominations and awards ===
Films that received multiple nominations
Nominations	Film
4	Enough Said
4	Lee Daniels' The Butler
4	Nebraska
4	Philomena
4	The Way, Way Back
3	All Is Lost
3	August: Osage County
3	Captain Phillips
3	Don Jon
3	Inside Llewyn Davis
3	Saving Mr. Banks
2	About Time
2	American Hustle
2	Before Midnight
2	Gloria

Films that received multiple awards
Wins	Film
2	Nebraska
