= 8th AARP Movies for Grownups Awards =

Film award ceremony

- Date: January 27, 2009

Highlights
- Most nominations: Mamma Mia! (5)

The 8th AARP Movies for Grownups Awards, presented by AARP the Magazine, honored films released in 2008 made by people over the age of 50 and were announced on January 27, 2009. Pierce Brosnan won the award for Breakthrough Achievement for his performance in Mamma Mia!. Unlike most years, the ceremony did not feature an award for Career Achievement.

== Awards ==
=== Winners and Nominees ===
Winners are listed first, highlighted in boldface, and indicated with a double dagger (‡).

**Best Movie for Grownups**: **Frost/Nixon**‡; The Curious Case of Benjamin Button; Doubt; Married Life; The Wrestler	**Best Director**: **Gus Van Sant – Milk**‡; Danny Boyle - Slumdog Millionaire; Jonathan Demme - Rachel Getting Married; Ron Howard - Frost/Nixon; John Patrick Shanley - Doubt
**Best Actor**: **Frank Langella - Frost/Nixon**‡; Mickey Rourke - The Wrestler; Clint Eastwood - Gran Torino; Chris Cooper - Married Life; Richard Jenkins - The Visitor	**Best Actress**: **Meryl Streep - Doubt**‡; Frances McDormand - Burn After Reading; Catherine Deneuve - A Christmas Tale; Alfre Woodard - Tyler Perry's The Family That Preys; Annette Bening - The Women
**Best Supporting Actor**: **Bill Irwin - Rachel Getting Married**‡; Bill Murray - City of Ember; John Malkovich - Burn After Reading; Dennis Quaid - The Express: The Ernie Davis Story; Pierce Brosnan - Mamma Mia!	**Best Supporting Actress**: **Christine Baranski and Julie Walters - Mamma Mia!** (tie)‡; Kim Cattrall - Sex and the City: The Movie; Bette Midler - Then She Found Me; Debra Winger - Rachel Getting Married; Cloris Leachman - The Women
**Best Comedy for Grownups**: **Ghost Town**‡; Smart People; What Just Happened; Baby Mama; Be Kind Rewind	**Best Screenwriter**: **J. Michael Straczynski - Changeling**‡; Woody Allen - Vicky Cristina Barcelona; Joel and Ethan Coen - Burn After Reading; Eric Roth - The Curious Case of Benjamin Button; John Patrick Shanley - Doubt
**Best Buddy Picture**: **Tyler Perry's The Family That Preys**‡; Mamma Mia!; Soul Men; The Women	**Best Intergenerational Film**: **The Visitor**‡; Rachel Getting Married; Gran Torino; The Curious Case of Benjamin Button; Smart People
**Best Grownup Love Story**: **Emma Thompson and Dustin Hoffman - Last Chance Harvey**‡; Meryl Streep and Pierce Brosnan - Mamma Mia!; Diane Lane and Richard Gere - Nights in Rodanthe; Karen Allen and Harrison Ford - Indiana Jones and the Kingdom of the Crystal Skull; Mary Steenburgen and Richard Jenkins - Step Brothers	**Best Movie for Grownups Who Refuse to Grow Up**: **Iron Man**‡; WALL-E; Kung Fu Panda; City of Ember; Marley & Me
**Best Documentary**: **Man on Wire**‡; Young@Heart; Chris & Don: A Love Story; I.O.U.S.A.; Flow: For Love of Water	**Best Foreign Film**: **The Edge of Heaven - Germany and Turkey**‡; A Christmas Tale - France; Late Bloomers - Switzerland; Silent Light - Mexico; The Class - France

=== Breakthrough Accomplishment ===
- Pierce Brosnan: "We just love the way he attacks the challenge of pop singing with such reckless abandon. Simon Cowell would be aghast, but we're charmed."

=== Films with multiple nominations and wins ===
Films that received multiple nominations
Nominations	Film
5	Mamma Mia!
4	Doubt
4	Rachel Getting Married
3	Burn After Reading
3	The Curious Case of Benjamin Button
3	Frost/Nixon
3	The Women
2	A Christmas Tale
2	City of Ember
2	Gran Torino
2	Married Life
2	Tyler Perry's The Family That Preys
2	Smart People
2	The Visitor
2	The Wrestler

Films that received multiple awards
Wins	Film
3	Frost/Nixon
3	Mamma Mia!
