= AARP Movies for Grownups Award for Best Grownup Love Story =

Retired annual US film award

- Awarded for: Best romance for an audience of people 50 and above
- Country: United States
- Presented by: AARP
- First award: 2003 (for films released during the 2002 film season)
- Most recent winner: Daryl McCormack and Emma Thompson; Good Luck to You, Leo Grande (2022)
- Website: https://www.aarp.org/entertainment/movies-for-grownups/

The AARP Movies for Grownups Award for Best Grownup Love Story is one of the AARP Movies for Grownups Awards presented annually by AARP the Magazine. The award honors the film with the best romance focused on adult characters, usually focusing on characters or performers over the age of 50. The award for Best Grownup Love Story was first given in 2003, when the awards expanded beyond their initial four categories of Best Movie for Grownups, Best Director, Best Actor, and Best Actress.

Despite its name, the award recognizes performers who portray the love story onscreen, not the film's screenwriter. While AARP the Magazine typically limits its winners and nominees to films by and about people over 50, there have been ten films nominated for Best Grownup Love Story whose romantic leads were both below that age: The Painted Veil, J. Edgar, Before Midnight, Carol, Breathe, The Greatest Showman, On the Basis of Sex, Emma., Wild Mountain Thyme, and Lady Chatterley's Lover. To date, The Greatest Showman is the only winner of Best Grownup Love Story in which all romantic leads were below the age of 50.

== Winners and Nominees ==
indicates the winners.

=== 2000s ===
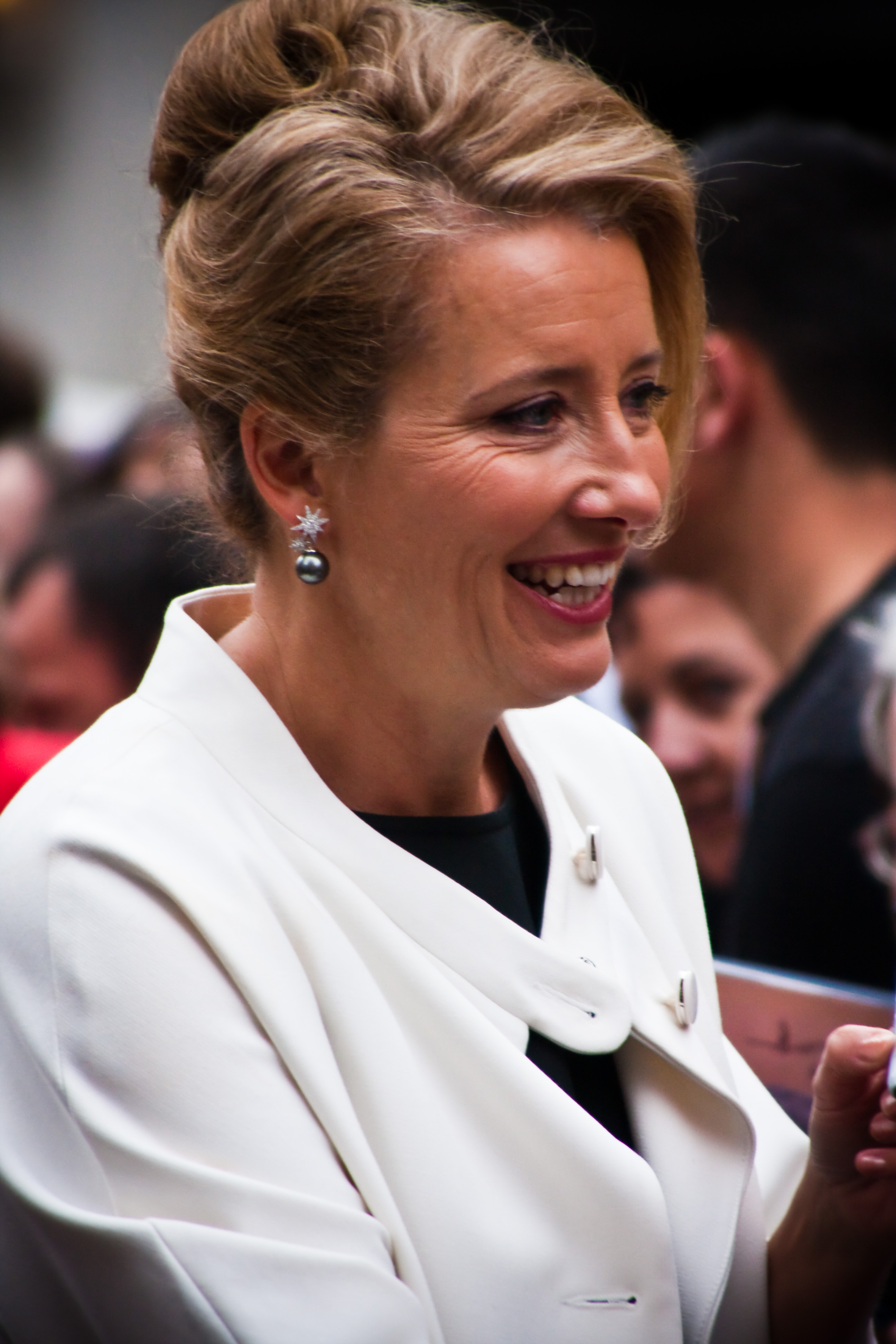
Emma Thompson's nomination for Love Actually made her the first performer nominated for Best Grownup Love Story while under the age of 50.

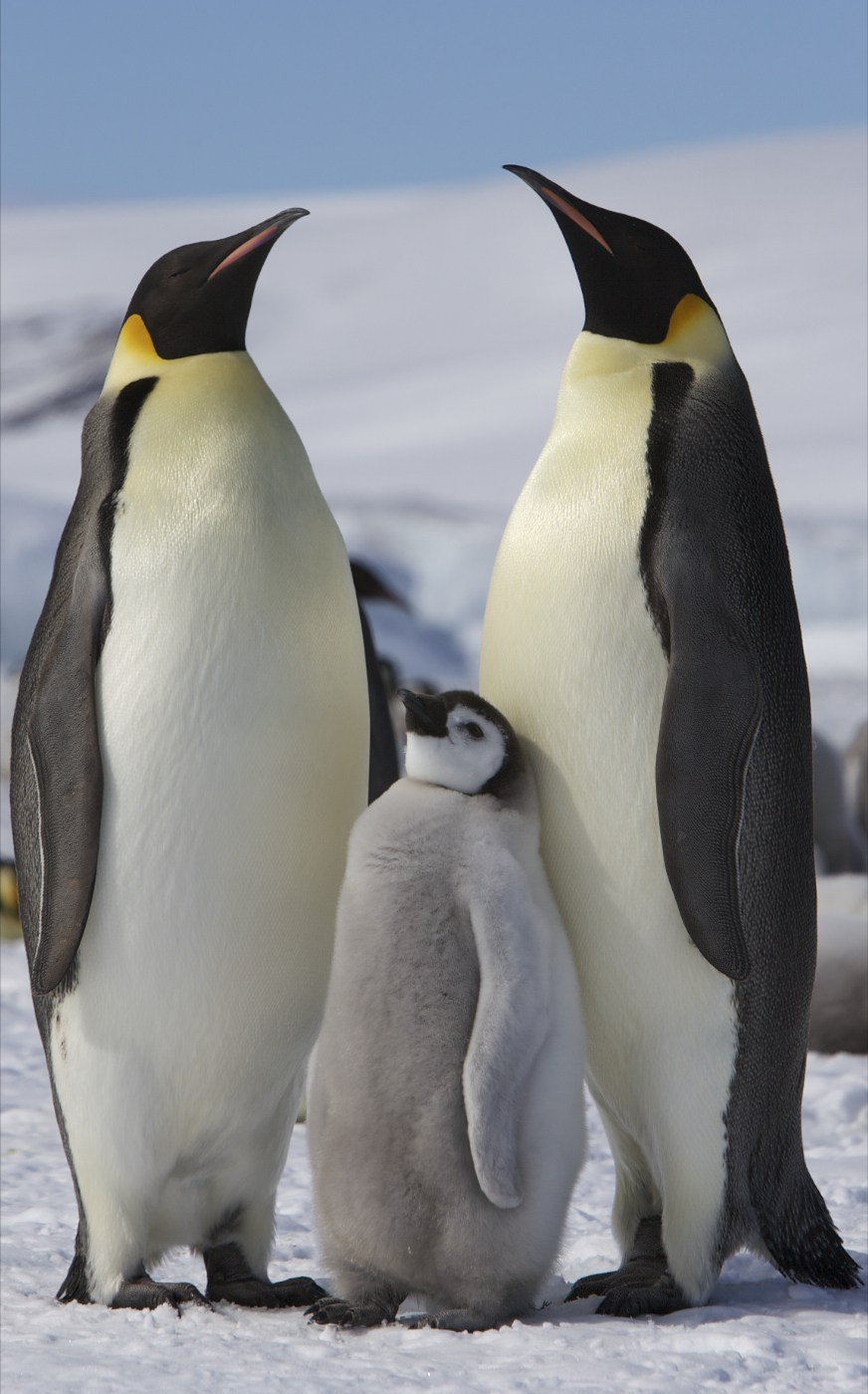
The Emperor penguins from March of the Penguins are the only nominees from a documentary, and the only non-human nominees.

Year	Performers	Film	Ref.
2002 (2nd)	Vanessa Redgrave and Albert Finney	The Gathering Storm ‡	
2002 (2nd)	Ellen Burstyn and James Garner	Divine Secrets of the Ya-Ya Sisterhood	
2002 (2nd)	Susan Sarandon and Dustin Hoffman	Moonlight Mile	
2002 (2nd)	Jill Clayburgh and Jeffrey Tambor	Never Again	
2003 (3rd)	Diane Keaton and Jack Nicholson	Something's Gotta Give ‡	
2003 (3rd)	Emma Thompson and Alan Rickman	Love Actually	
2003 (3rd)	Catherine O'Hara and Eugene Levy	A Mighty Wind	
2004 (4th)	Gena Rowlands and James Garner	The Notebook ‡	
2004 (4th)	Helen Mirren and Robert Redford	The Clearing	
2004 (4th)	Marg Helgenberger and Dennis Quaid	In Good Company	
2004 (4th)	Susan Sarandon and Richard Gere	Shall We Dance?	
2005 (5th)	Diane Keaton and Craig T. Nelson	The Family Stone ‡	
2005 (5th)	Joan Allen and Kevin Costner	The Upside of Anger	
2005 (5th)	Olympia Dukakis and Peter Falk	The Thing About My Folks	
2005 (5th)	Rene Russo and Al Pacino	Two for the Money	
2005 (5th)	The penguin pairs	March of the Penguins	
2006 (6th)	Blythe Danner and Tom Wilkinson	The Last Kiss ‡	
2006 (6th)	Louise Fletcher and Donald Sutherland	Aurora Borealis	
2006 (6th)	Sally Kellerman and Len Cariou	Boynton Beach Club	
2006 (6th)	Kristin Scott Thomas and Rowan Atkinson	Keeping Mum	
2006 (6th)	Naomi Watts and Edward Norton	The Painted Veil	
2007 (7th)	John Travolta and Christopher Walken	Hairspray ‡	
2008 (8th)	Emma Thompson and Dustin Hoffman	Last Chance Harvey	
2008 (8th)	Meryl Streep and Pierce Brosnan	Mamma Mia!	
2008 (8th)	Diane Lane and Richard Gere	Nights in Rodanthe	
2008 (8th)	Karen Allen and Harrison Ford	Indiana Jones and the Kingdom of the Crystal Skull	
2008 (8th)	Mary Steenburgen and Richard Jenkins	Step Brothers	
2009 (9th)	Meryl Streep and Stanley Tucci	Julie & Julia ‡	
2009 (9th)	Helen Mirren and Christopher Plummer	The Last Station	
2009 (9th)	Imelda Staunton and Henry Goodman	Taking Woodstock	
2009 (9th)	Marcia Gay Harden and Daniel Stern	Whip It	
2009 (9th)	Meryl Streep and Alec Baldwin	It's Complicated	

=== 2010s ===
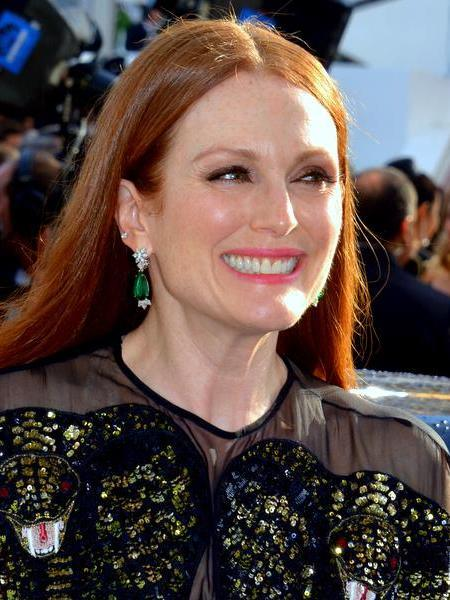
Julianne Moore has been nominated twice for lesbian romances, in The Kids Are All Right and Freeheld.

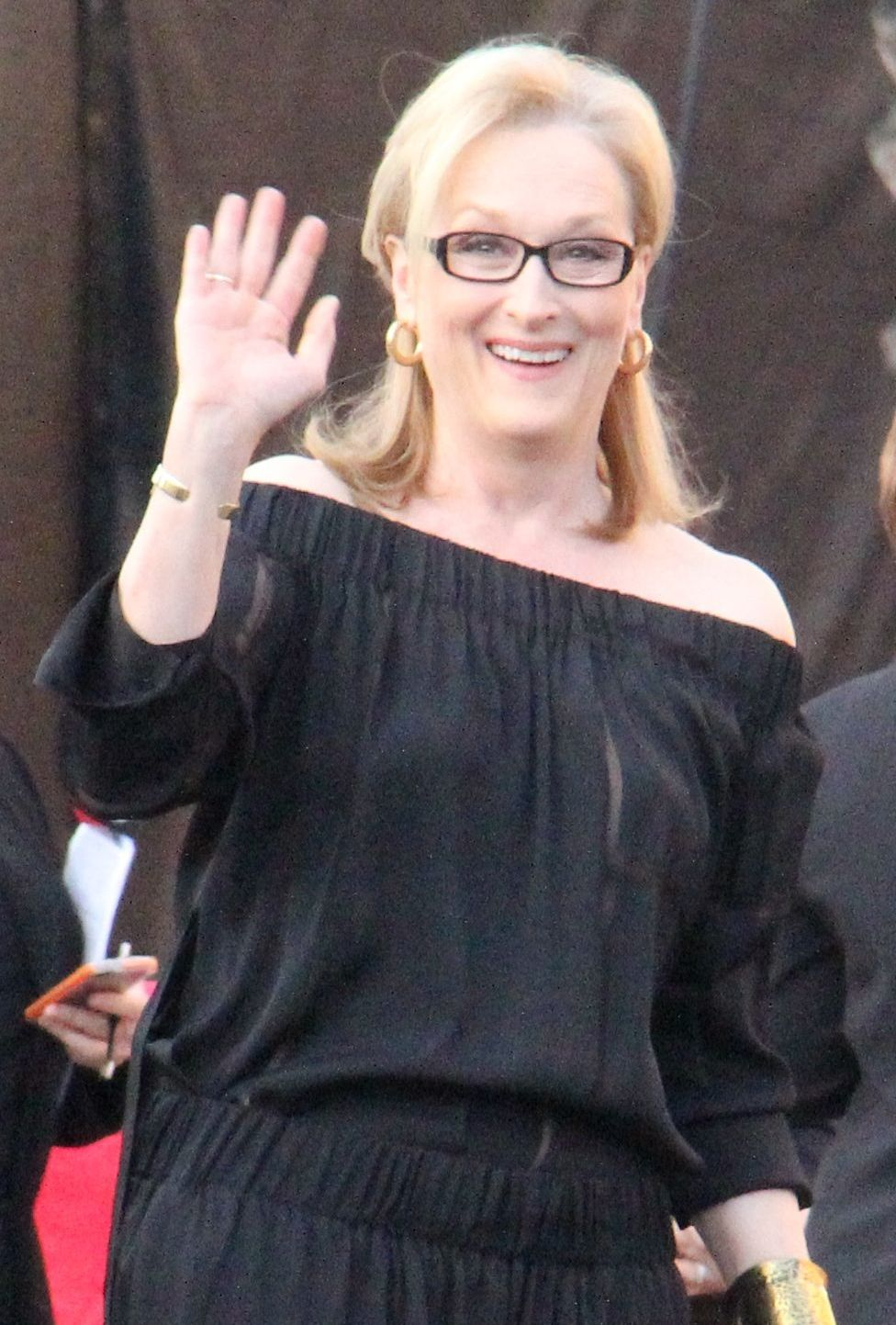
Meryl Streep has been nominated a record six times, including twice in 2009 for It's Complicated and Julie & Julia, for which she won alongside Stanley Tucci.

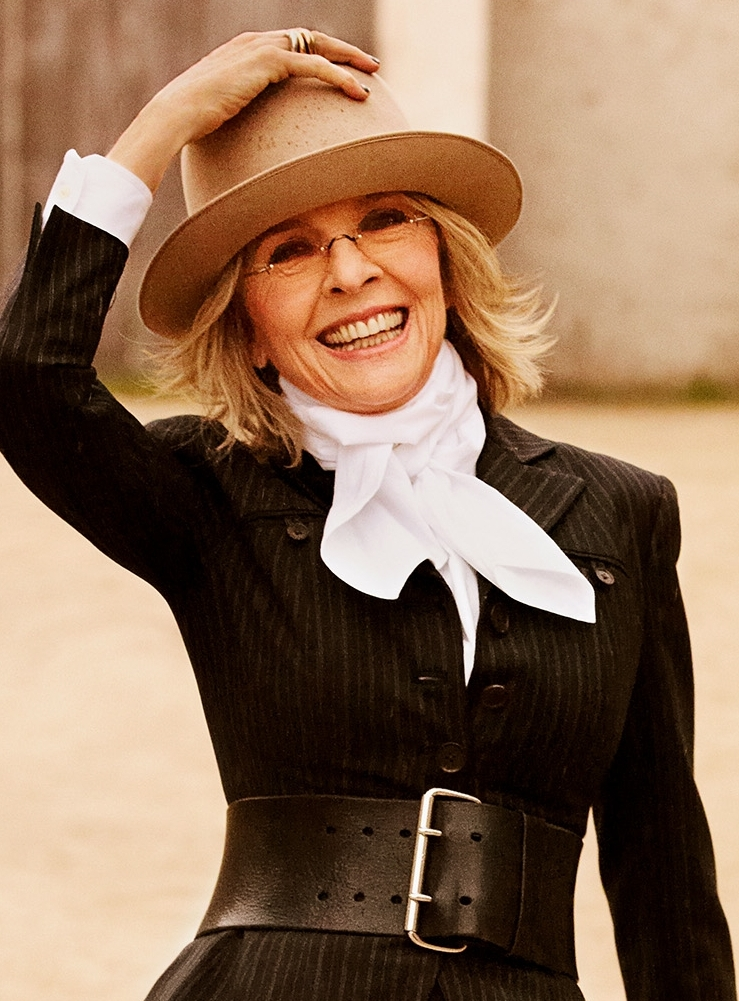
Diane Keaton has won three of the four times she was nominated.

Year	Performers	Film	Ref.
2010 (10th)	Annette Bening and Julianne Moore	The Kids Are All Right ‡	
2010 (10th)	Blythe Danner and Richard Dreyfuss	The Lightkeepers	
2010 (10th)	Julianna Margulies and Andy Garcia	City Island	
2010 (10th)	Ruth Sheen and Jim Broadbent	Another Year	
2010 (10th)	Naomi Watts and Sean Penn	Fair Game	
2011 (11th)	Meryl Streep and Jim Broadbent	The Iron Lady ‡	
2011 (11th)	Emily Watson and Peter Mullan	War Horse	
2011 (11th)	Jodie Foster and Mel Gibson	The Beaver	
2011 (11th)	Leonardo DiCaprio and Armie Hammer	J. Edgar	
2012 (12th)	Helen Mirren and Anthony Hopkins	Hitchcock ‡	
2012 (12th)	Tom Wilkinson and Rajendra Gupta	The Best Exotic Marigold Hotel	
2012 (12th)	Meryl Streep and Tommy Lee Jones	Hope Springs	
2012 (12th)	Sally Field and Daniel Day-Lewis	Lincoln	
2012 (12th)	Maggie Smith and Tom Courtenay	Quartet	
2013 (13th)	Julia Louis-Dreyfus and James Gandolfini	Enough Said ‡	
2013 (13th)	Julie Delpy and Ethan Hawke	Before Midnight	
2013 (13th)	Oprah Winfrey and Forest Whitaker	Lee Daniels' The Butler	
2013 (13th)	Geneviève Bujold and James Cromwell	Still Mine	
2013 (13th)	Vanessa Redgrave and Terence Stamp	Song for Marion	
2014 (14th)	John Lithgow and Alfred Molina	Love Is Strange ‡	
2014 (14th)	Diane Keaton and Michael Douglas	And So it Goes	
2014 (14th)	Helen Mirren and Om Puri	The Hundred-Foot Journey	
2014 (14th)	Kristin Scott Thomas and Kevin Kline	My Old Lady	
2014 (14th)	Lindsay Duncan and Jim Broadbent	Le Week-End	
2015 (15th)	Diane Keaton and Morgan Freeman	5 Flights Up ‡	
2015 (15th)	Charlotte Rampling and Tom Courtenay	45 Years	
2015 (15th)	Cate Blanchett and Rooney Mara	Carol	
2015 (15th)	Julianne Moore and Elliot Page	Freeheld	
2015 (15th)	Blythe Danner and Sam Elliott	I'll See You in My Dreams	
2016 (16th)	Margo Martindale and Richard Jenkins	The Hollars ‡	
2016 (16th)	Viola Davis and Denzel Washington	Fences	
2016 (16th)	Meryl Streep and Hugh Grant	Florence Foster Jenkins	
2016 (16th)	Lainie Kazan and Michael Constantine	My Big Fat Greek Wedding 2	
2016 (16th)	Susan Sarandon and J.K. Simmons	The Meddler	
2017 (17th)	Michelle Williams and Hugh Jackman	The Greatest Showman ‡	
2017 (17th)	Claire Foy and Andrew Garfield	Breathe	
2017 (17th)	Annette Bening and Jamie Bell	Film Stars Don't Die in Liverpool	
2017 (17th)	Helen Mirren and Donald Sutherland	The Leisure Seeker	
2017 (17th)	Jane Fonda and Robert Redford	Our Souls at Night	
2018 (18th)	Blythe Danner and Robert Forster	What They Had	
2018 (18th)	Judi Dench and Kenneth Branagh	All is True	
2018 (18th)	Felicity Jones and Armie Hammer	On the Basis of Sex	
2018 (18th)	Kathryn Hahn and Paul Giamatti	Private Life	
2018 (18th)	Sissy Spacek and Robert Redford	The Old Man & the Gun	
2019 (19th)	No award was given for Best Grownup Love Story for 2019.	N/A	

=== 2020s ===
Year	Performers	Film	Ref.
2020/21 (20th)	Colin Firth and Stanley Tucci	Supernova ‡	
2020/21 (20th)	Anya Taylor-Joy and Johnny Flynn	Emma.	
2020/21 (20th)	Lesley Manville and Liam Neeson	Ordinary Love	
2020/21 (20th)	Emily Blunt and Jamie Dornan	Wild Mountain Thyme	
2020/21 (20th)	Talia Shire and Peter Gerety	Working Man	
2021 (21st)	Haley Bennett and Peter Dinklage	Cyrano‡	
2021 (21st)	Dave Johns and Alison Steadman	23 Walks	
2021 (21st)	Caitríona Balfe & Jamie Dornan and Ciarán Hinds & Judi Dench	Belfast	
2021 (21st)	Jim Broadbent and Helen Mirren	The Duke	
2021 (21st)	Frances McDormand and Denzel Washington	The Tragedy of Macbeth	
2022 (22nd)	Daryl McCormack and Emma Thompson	Good Luck to You, Leo Grande‡	
2022 (22nd)	Olivia Colman and Micheal Ward	Empire of Light	
2022 (22nd)	Emma Corrin and Jack O'Connell	Lady Chatterley's Lover	
2022 (22nd)	Dale Dickey and Wes Studi	A Love Song	
2022 (22nd)	George Clooney and Julia Roberts	Ticket to Paradise	

== Actors with multiple wins and nominations ==
=== Multiple wins ===
Wins	Performer
3	Diane Keaton
2	Blythe Danner
2	Meryl Streep
2	Emma Thompson
2	Stanley Tucci

=== Multiple nominations ===
Nominations	Performer
6	Helen Mirren
6	Meryl Streep
4	Jim Broadbent
4	Blythe Danner
4	Diane Keaton
3	Robert Redford
3	Susan Sarandon
3	Emma Thompson
2	Annette Bening
2	Tom Courtenay
2	Judi Dench
2	Jamie Dornan
2	James Garner
2	Richard Gere
2	Armie Hammer
2	Dustin Hoffman
2	Richard Jenkins
2	Julianne Moore
2	Vanessa Redgrave
2	Kristin Scott Thomas
2	Donald Sutherland
2	Stanley Tucci
2	Naomi Watts
2	Tom Wilkinson

== Age superlatives ==
Record	Performer	Film	Age (in years)
Oldest winner	Morgan Freeman	5 Flights Up	78
Oldest nominee	Michael Constantine	My Big Fat Greek Wedding 2	89
Youngest winner	Michelle Williams	The Greatest Showman	37
Youngest nominee	Anya Taylor-Joy	Emma.	24
