= AARP Movies for Grownups Award for Best Foreign Film =

Retired annual US film award

AARP Movies for Grownups Award for Best Foreign Film/Best International Film
- Awarded for: Best movie not in the English language that is by or about people over 50
- Country: United States
- Presented by: AARP
- First award: 2002 (for films released during the 2001 film season)
- Currently held by: Sentimental Value (2025)
- Website: https://www.aarp.org/entertainment/movies-for-grownups/

The AARP Movies for Grownups Award for Best Foreign Film is one of the AARP Movies for Grownups Awards presented annually by the AARP. The award honors the best film in the English language that is made by or focuses on people over the age of 50. The Best Foreign Film Award is one of the seven original trophies issued by AARP the Magazine, along with awards for Best Movie for Grownups, Best Director, Best Actor, Best Actress, Best Documentary, and Best Movie for Grownups Who Refuse to Grow Up.

The exact name of the award has shifted occasionally throughout its history. At the 1st AARP Movies for Grownups Awards, it was referred to as Best Foreign Film. In some years, it was referred to as Best Foreign Language Film instead. In 2021, the AARP titled the award "Best Foreign Film/Best International Film," mirroring the Academy of Motion Picture Arts and Sciences's shift that year from Best Foreign Language Feature Film to Best International Feature Film. They returned to the title Best Foreign Film the next year.

== Winners and nominees ==
indicates the winners.

=== 2000s ===
Year	Film title used in nomination	Original title	Director(s)	Country or countries	Language(s)
2001 (1st)	Under the Sand	Sous le sable	François Ozon	France	French
2002 (2nd)	Monsoon Wedding		Mira Nair	India	Hindi
2002 (2nd)	The Fast Runner	ᐊᑕᓈᕐᔪᐊᑦ	Zacharias Kunuk	Canada	Inuktitut
2002 (2nd)	I'm Going Home	Je rentre à la maison Vou Para Casa	Manoel de Oliveira	France; Portugal	French; English
2002 (2nd)	Rabbit-Proof Fence	Rabbit-Proof Fence	Phillip Noyce	Australia	Walmajarri; English
2003 (3rd)	Nowhere in Africa	Nirgendwo in Afrika	Caroline Link	Germany	German; Swahili; English
2003 (3rd)	Autumn Spring	Babí léto	Vladimír Michálek	Czech Republic	Czech
2003 (3rd)	The Barbarian Invasions	Les Invasions barbares	Denys Arcand	Canada; France	French; English
2003 (3rd)	Russian Ark	Русский ковчег Russkij Kovcheg	Alexander Sokurov	Russia	Russian; Persian
2004 (4th)	Good Bye, Lenin!	Good Bye, Lenin!	Wolfgang Becker	Germany	German
2004 (4th)	The Motorcycle Diaries	Diarios de motocicleta	Walter Salles	Argentina	Spanish; Quechua
2004 (4th)	Osama	اُسامه	Siddiq Barmak	Afghanistan	Dari
2004 (4th)	Monsieur Ibrahim	Monsieur Ibrahim et les fleurs du Coran	François Dupeyron	France	French
2004 (4th)	The Sea Inside	Mar adentro	Alejandro Amenábar	Spain	Spanish; Galician; Catalan
2005 (5th)	Ushpizin	האושפיזין	Gidi Dar	Israel	Hebrew
2005 (5th)	Bad Education	La mala educación	Pedro Almodóvar	Spain	Spanish
2005 (5th)	Saraband	Saraband	Ingmar Bergman	Sweden	Swedish; English; German
2005 (5th)	After You...	Après vous	Pierre Salvadori	France	French
2005 (5th)	Crónicas	Crónicas	Sebastián Cordero	Ecuador	Spanish; English
2006 (6th)	The Lives of Others	Das Leben der Anderen	Florian Henckel von Donnersmarck	Germany	German
2006 (6th)	The Young Lieutenant	Le Petit Lieutenant	Xavier Beauvois	France	French
2006 (6th)	The Syrian Bride	הכלה הסורית	Eran Riklis	Israel	Arabic; English; Hebrew; Russian; French
2006 (6th)	Volver	Volver	Pedro Almodóvar	Spain	Spanish
2006 (6th)	Water	Water वाटर	Deepa Mehta	Canada	Hindi
2007 (7th)	My Best Friend	Mon meilleur ami	Patrice Leconte	France	French
2007 (7th)	After the Wedding	Efter brylluppet	Susanne Bier	Denmark; Sweden	Danish; English
2007 (7th)	Vitus	Vitus	Fredi M. Murer	Switzerland	Swiss German
2007 (7th)	La Vie en Rose	La Vie en Rose	Olivier Dahan	France	French
2007 (7th)	Persepolis	Persepolis	Marjane Satrapi; Vincent Paronnaud	France	French; English; Persian; German
2008 (8th)	The Edge of Heaven	Auf der anderen Seite; Yaşamın Kıyısında	Fatih Akin	Germany; Turkey	German; Turkish; English
2008 (8th)	A Christmas Tale	Un conte de Noël	Arnaud Desplechin	France	French
2008 (8th)	Late Bloomers	Die Herbstzeitlosen	Bettina Oberli; Stephanie Glaser	Switzerland	Swiss German
2008 (8th)	Silent Light	Stellet Licht	Carlos Reygadas	Mexico	Plautdietsch
2008 (8th)	The Class	Entre les murs	Laurent Cantet	France	French
2009 (9th)	Captain Abu Raed	كابتن أبو رائد	Amin Matalqa	Jordan	Arabic
2009 (9th)	The Beaches of Agnès	Les plages d'Agnès	Agnès Varda	France	French
2009 (9th)	For My Father	סוף שבוע בתל אביב	Dror Zahavi	Israel	Hebrew
2009 (9th)	O' Horten	O' Horten	Bent Hamer	Norway	Norwegian
2009 (9th)	Terribly Happy	Frygtelig lykkelig	Henrik Ruben Genz	Denmark	Danish

=== 2010s ===
Year	Film title used in nomination	Original title	Director(s)	Country or countries	Language(s)
2010 (10th)	Farewell	L'affaire Farewell	Christian Carion	France	French; Russian; English
2010 (10th)	A Film Unfinished	שתיקת הארכיון; Geheimsache Ghettofilm	Yael Hersonski	Germany; Israel	English; Hebrew; German; Polish
2010 (10th)	The First Beautiful Thing	La prima cosa bella	Paolo Virzi	Italy	Italian
2010 (10th)	Mother	마더	Bong Joon-ho	South Korea	Korean
2010 (10th)	Peepli Live	Peepli Live	Anusha Rizvi	India	Hindi
2011 (11th)	The Names of Love	Le Nom des gens	Michel Leclerc	France	French
2011 (11th)	For 80 Days	80 Dias	Jon Garaño	Spain	Spanish
2011 (11th)	In Darkness	W ciemności	Agnieszka Holland	Poland	Polish
2011 (11th)	Queen to Play	Joueuse	Caroline Bottaro	France	French
2011 (11th)	The Skin I Live In	La piel que habito	Pedro Almodóvar	Spain	Spanish
2012 (12th)	Amour		Michael Haneke	Austria	French
2013 (13th)	Renoir	Renoir	Gilles Bourdos	France	French
2013 (13th)	The Act of Killing	Jagal	Joshua Oppenheimer; Christine Cynn; Anonymous Indonesian	Denmark; Norway; United Kingdom	Indonesian
2013 (13th)	Child's Pose	Poziția copilului	Călin Peter Netzer	Romania	Romanian
2013 (13th)	Gloria	Gloria	Sebastián Lelio	Chile	Spanish
2013 (13th)	Hannah Arendt	Hannah Arendt	Margarethe von Trotta	Germany; Luxembourg; France	German; English; French; Hebrew; Latin
2014 (14th)	Diplomacy	Diplomatie	Volker Schlöndorff	Germany; France	French; German
2014 (14th)	The Admiral: Roaring Currents	명량	Kim Han-min	South Korea	Korean; Japanese
2014 (14th)	Human Capital	Il capitale umano	Paolo Virzi	Italy	Italian
2014 (14th)	Leviathan	Левиафан	Andrey Zvyagintsev	Russia	Russian
2014 (14th)	Manakamana	Manakamana	Stephanie Spray; Pacho Velez	Nepal	Nepali
2015 (15th)	Rams	Hrútar	Grímur Hákonarson	Iceland	Icelandic
2015 (15th)	Mia Madre		Nanni Moretti	Italy	Italian
2015 (15th)	The Salt of the Earth	Le sel de la terre	Wim Wenders; Juliano Ribeiro Salgado	Brazil	French; Portuguese; Italian
2015 (15th)	Tangerines	მანდარინები Mandariinid	Zaza Urushadze	Estonia (Georgia (country)) Georgia	Estonian; Russian
2015 (15th)	Taxi	تاکسی	Jafar Panahi	Iran	Persian
2016 (16th)	Elle	Elle	Paul Verhoeven	France	French
2016 (16th)	A Man Called Ove	En man som heter Ove	Hannes Holm	Sweden	Swedish
2016 (16th)	Aquarius		Kleber Mendonça Filho	Brazil	Portuguese
2016 (16th)	Our Last Tango	Un tango más	German Kral	Argentina	Spanish
2016 (16th)	The People vs. Fritz Bauer	Der Staat gegen Fritz Bauer	Lars Kraume	Germany	German
2017 (17th)	A Taxi Driver	택시운전사	Jang Hoon	South Korea	Korean
2017 (17th)	Chavela		Catherine Gund; Daresha Kyi	Mexico	Spanish
2017 (17th)	The Insult	ʼadiyye raʼam 23 (قضية رقم ٢٣)	Ziad Doueiri	Lebanon	Arabic (Lebanese)
2017 (17th)	Like Crazy	La pazza gioia	Paolo Virzi	Italy	Italian
2017 (17th)	The Women's Balcony	ישמח חתני	Emil Ben-Shimon	Israel	Hebrew
2018 (18th)	Roma		Alfonso Cuarón	Mexico	Spanish / Mixtec
2018 (18th)	Cold War	Zimna wojna	Paweł Pawlikowski	Poland	Polish
2018 (18th)	Never Look Away	Werk ohne Autor	Florian Henckel von Donnersmarck	Germany	German
2018 (18th)	Shoplifters	Manbiki Kazoku (万引き家族)	Hirokazu Kore-eda	Japan	Japanese
2018 (18th)	The Guilty	Den skyldige	Gustav Möller	Denmark	Danish
2019 (19th)	Pain and Glory	Dolor y gloria	Pedro Almodóvar	Spain	Spanish
2019 (19th)	An Unexpected Love	El amor menos pensado	Juan Vera	Argentina	Spanish
2019 (19th)	Parasite	기생충	Bong Joon-ho	South Korea	Korean
2019 (19th)	The Farewell	别告诉她	Lulu Wang	United States	Mandarin; English
2019 (19th)	The Unorthodox		Eliran Malka	Israel	Hebrew

=== 2020s ===
Year	Film title used in nomination	Original title	Director(s)	Country or countries	Language(s)
2020/21 (20th)	Collective	Colectiv	Alexander Nanau	Romania	Romanian
2020/21 (20th)	Another Round	Druk	Thomas Vinterberg	Denmark	Danish
2020/21 (20th)	Bacurau		Kleber Mendonça Filho; Juliano Dornelles	Brazil	Portuguese
2020/21 (20th)	The Life Ahead	La vita davanti a sé	Edoardo Ponti	Italy	Italian
2020/21 (20th)	The Weasels' Tale	El Cuento de las Comadrejas	Juan José Campanella	Argentina	Spanish
2021 (21st)	Sheep Without a Shepherd	误杀	Sam Quah	China	Mandarin
2021 (21st)	Drive My Car	ドライブ・マイ・カー	Ryusuke Hamaguchi	Japan	Japanese
2021 (21st)	The Hand of God	È stata la mano di Dio	Paolo Sorrentino	Italy	Italian
2021 (21st)	There Is No Evil	شیطان وجود ندارد	Mohammad Rasoulof	Iran	Persian
2021 (21st)	Two of Us	Deux	Filippo Meneghetti	France	French, German
2022 (22nd)	The Quiet Girl	An Cailín Ciúin	Colm Bairéad	(Republic of Ireland) Ireland	Irish
2022 (22nd)	Argentina, 1985		Santiago Mitre	Argentina	Spanish
2022 (22nd)	Bardo, False Chronicle of a Handful of Truths	Bardo, falsa crónica de unas cuantas verdades	Alejandro G. Iñárritu	Mexico	Spanish, English
2022 (22nd)	Broker	브로커	Hirokazu Kore-eda	South Korea	Korean
2022 (22nd)	One Fine Morning	Un beau matin	Mia Hansen-Løve	France	French
2023 (23rd)	The Zone of Interest		Jonathan Glazer	United Kingdom	German, Polish, Yiddish
2023 (23rd)	Amerikatsi	Ամերիկացի	Michael A. Goorjian	Armenia	Armenian, English, Russian
2023 (23rd)	Perfect Days	パーフェクト・デイズ	Wim Wenders	Japan	Japanese
2023 (23rd)	Radical		Christopher Zalla	Mexico	Spanish
2023 (23rd)	The Taste of Things	La Passion de Dodin Bouffant	Trần Anh Hùng	France	French
2025 (25th)	Sentimental Value	Affeksjonsverdi	Joachim Trier	Norway	Norwegian, English, Swedish
2025 (25th)	It Was Just an Accident	یک تصادف ساده	Jafar Panahi	Iran France	Persian, Azerbaijani
2025 (25th)	No Other Choice	어쩔수가없다	Park Chan-wook	South Korea	Korean
2025 (25th)	Nouvelle Vague		Richard Linklater	France	French, English
2025 (25th)	The Secret Agent	O Agente Secreto	Kleber Mendonça Filho	Brazil	Portuguese, German

== Awards and nominations by country ==
The following countries received three or more nominations for Best Foreign Film:

Wins	Country	Nominations
7	France	22
5	Germany	9
1	Israel	6
1	Spain	6
1	South Korea	5
1	Mexico	5
1	United Kingdom	2
0	Italy	6
0	Denmark	5
0	Argentina	5
0	Brazil	3
0	Canada	3
0	Sweden	3
0	Japan	3

The following directors received multiple Best Foreign Film nominations:

Wins	Director	Nominations
1	(Spain) Pedro Almodóvar	4
1	(Germany) Florian Henckel von Donnersmarck	2
0	(Italy) Paolo Virzi	3
0	(South Korea) Bong Joon-ho	2
0	(South Korea) Hirokazu Kore-eda	2
0	(Brazil) Kleber Mendonça Filho	2
0	(Germany) Wim Wenders	2
