= AARP Movies for Grownups Award for Best Movie for Grownups Who Refuse to Grow Up =

Retired annual US film award

- Awarded for: Best film targeted at people below the age of 50
- Country: United States
- Presented by: AARP
- First award: 2002 (for films released during the 2001 film season)
- Final award: 2017
- Most recent winner: Kubo and the Two Strings (2016)
- Website: https://www.aarp.org/entertainment/movies-for-grownups/

The AARP Movies for Grownups Award for Best Movie for Grownups Who Refuse to Grow Up was one of the AARP Movies for Grownups Awards presented annually by the AARP. The award honored the best film in a given year that, while targeted at people below the age of 50, could still be enjoyed by an older audience.

== History ==
The award is one of the seven original trophies issued by AARP the Magazine, along with awards for Best Movie for Grownups, Best Director, Best Actor, Best Actress, Best Foreign Film, and Best Documentary. The award was discontinued after the 16th AARP Movies for Grownups Awards in 2017.

== Winners and Nominees ==
indicates the winners.

=== 2000s ===
Year	Film	Director	Ref.
2001 (1st)	Shrek‡	Andrew Adamson & Vicky Jenson	
2002 (2nd)	Spirited Away‡	Hayao Miyazaki	
2002 (2nd)	Harry Potter and the Chamber of Secrets	Chris Columbus	
2002 (2nd)	Ice Age	Chris Wedge	
2002 (2nd)	Jonah: A VeggieTales Movie	Phil Vischer & Mike Nawrocki	
2003 (3rd)	School of Rock‡	Richard Linklater	
2003 (3rd)	Finding Nemo	Andrew Stanton	
2003 (3rd)	Kill Bill: Volume 1	Quentin Tarantino	
2004 (4th)	The Incredibles‡	Brad Bird	
2004 (4th)	Anchorman: The Legend of Ron Burgundy	Adam McKay	
2004 (4th)	Dodgeball: A True Underdog Story	Rawson Marshall Thurber	
2004 (4th)	Mean Girls	Mark Waters	
2004 (4th)	The Polar Express	Robert Zemeckis	
2005 (5th)	King Kong‡	Peter Jackson	
2005 (5th)	Batman Begins	Christopher Nolan	
2005 (5th)	The Chronicles of Narnia: The Lion, the Witch and the Wardrobe	Andrew Adamson	
2005 (5th)	Wallace & Gromit: The Curse of the Were-Rabbit	Nick Park & Steve Box	
2005 (5th)	Wedding Crashers	David Dobkin	
2006 (6th)	Lassie‡	Charles Sturridge	
2006 (6th)	Charlotte's Web	Gary Winick	
2006 (6th)	Nacho Libre	Jared Hess	
2006 (6th)	Nanny McPhee	Kirk Jones	
2006 (6th)	Night at the Museum	Shawn Levy	
2007 (7th)	Enchanted‡	Kevin Lima	
2007 (7th)	Ratatouille	Brad Bird	
2007 (7th)	Mr. Bean's Holiday	Steve Bendelack	
2007 (7th)	Knocked Up	Judd Apatow	
2007 (7th)	The Simpsons Movie	David Silverman	
2008 (8th)	Iron Man‡	Jon Favreau	
2008 (8th)	Wall-E	Andrew Stanton	
2008 (8th)	Kung Fu Panda	John Stevenson & Mark Osborne	
2008 (8th)	City of Ember	Gil Kenan	
2008 (8th)	Marley & Me	David Frankel	
2009 (9th)	Star Trek‡	J. J. Abrams	
2009 (9th)	Coraline	Henry Selick	
2009 (9th)	The Princess and the Frog	Ron Clements & John Musker	
2009 (9th)	Fantastic Mr. Fox	Wes Anderson	
2009 (9th)	Up	Pete Docter	

=== 2010s ===
Year	Film	Director	Ref.
2010 (10th)	The Karate Kid‡	Harald Zwart	
2010 (10th)	Alice in Wonderland	Tim Burton	
2010 (10th)	Diary of a Wimpy Kid	Thor Freudenthal	
2010 (10th)	How to Train Your Dragon	Chris Sanders & Dean DeBlois	
2010 (10th)	Toy Story 3	Lee Unkrich	
2011 (11th)	The Muppets‡	James Bobin	
2011 (11th)	Dolphin Tale	Charles Martin Smith	
2011 (11th)	Harry Potter and the Deathly Hallows – Part 2	David Yates	
2011 (11th)	Hugo	Martin Scorsese	
2012 (12th)	Moonrise Kingdom‡	Wes Anderson	
2012 (12th)	The Hobbit: An Unexpected Journey	Peter Jackson	
2012 (12th)	Mirror Mirror	Tarsem Singh	
2012 (12th)	The Three Stooges	Farrelly brothers	
2012 (12th)	Wreck-It Ralph	Rich Moore	
2013 (13th)	Saving Mr. Banks‡	John Lee Hancock	
2013 (13th)	Cloudy with a Chance of Meatballs	Phil Lord and Christopher Miller	
2013 (13th)	Frozen	Chris Buck & Jennifer Lee	
2013 (13th)	The Lone Ranger	Gore Verbinski	
2014 (14th)	The Lego Movie‡	Phil Lord and Christopher Miller	
2014 (14th)	Big Hero 6	Don Hall & Chris Williams	
2014 (14th)	Maleficent	Robert Stromberg	
2014 (14th)	Muppets Most Wanted	James Bobin	
2014 (14th)	Night at the Museum: Secret of the Tomb	Shawn Levy	
2015 (15th)	Inside Out‡	Pete Docter	
2015 (15th)	Kingsman: The Secret Service	Matthew Vaughn	
2015 (15th)	Paddington	Paul King	
2015 (15th)	The Peanuts Movie	Steve Martino	
2015 (15th)	Shaun the Sheep Movie	Mark Burton & Richard Starzak	
2016 (16th)	Kubo and the Two Strings‡	Travis Knight	
2016 (16th)	Moana	Ron Clements & John Musker	
2016 (16th)	Sing	Garth Jennings	
2016 (16th)	The Jungle Book	Jon Favreau	
2016 (16th)	Zootopia	Byron Howard & Rich Moore	
