= AARP Movies for Grownups Award for Best Supporting Actress =

Annual US film award

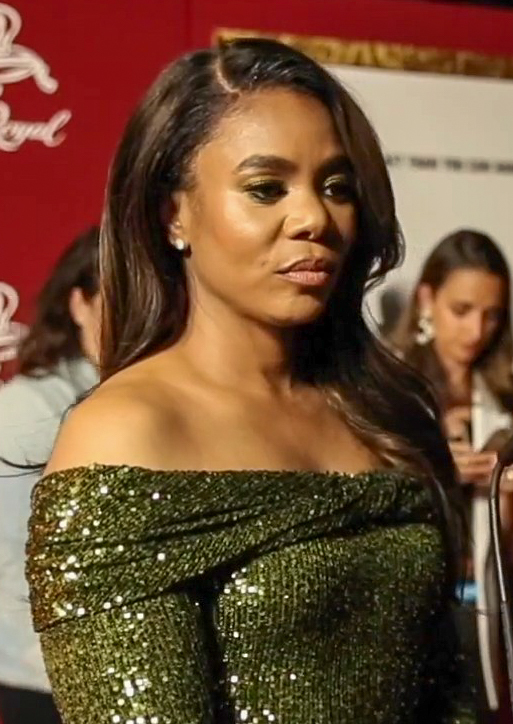
- The 2025 recipient: Regina Hall
- Awarded for: Best Performance by an Actress over 50 in a Supporting Role
- Country: United States
- Presented by: AARP
- First award: Ruby Dee for American Gangster (2007)
- Currently held by: Regina Hall for One Battle After Another (2025)
- Website: https://www.aarp.org/entertainment/movies-for-grownups/

The AARP Movies for Grownups Award for Best Supporting Actress is one of the AARP Movies for Grownups Awards presented annually by the AARP. The award honors an actress over the age of 50 who has given an outstanding supporting performance in a film in a given year. The awards for Supporting Actress and Supporting Actor were first given at the 7th AARP Movies for Grownups Awards in 2008. Prior to that, the only individual acting awards were for Best Actor and Best Actress.

== Winners and Nominees ==
indicates the winners.

=== 2000s ===
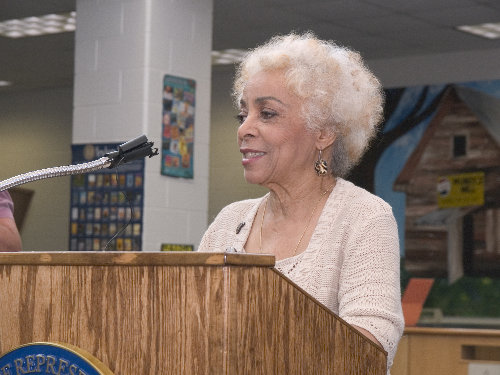
Ruby Dee was the first and, to date, oldest winner of Best Supporting Actress, for her role in American Gangster.

Year	Actress	Role(s)	Film	Ref.
2007 (7th)	Ruby Dee ‡	Mama Lucas	American Gangster	
2007 (7th)	Jane Asher	Sandra	Death at a Funeral	
2007 (7th)	Olympia Dukakis	Marian	Away from Her	
2007 (7th)	Fernanda Montenegro	Tránsito Ariza	Love in the Time of Cholera	
2007 (7th)	Vanessa Redgrave	Briony Tallis	Atonement	
2008 (8th)	Christine Baranski ‡ (tie)	Tanya Chesham-Leigh	Mamma Mia!	
2008 (8th)	Julie Walters ‡ (tie)	Rosie Mulligan	Mamma Mia!	
2008 (8th)	Kim Cattrall	Samantha Jones	Sex and the City	
2008 (8th)	Cloris Leachman	Maggie	The Women	
2008 (8th)	Bette Midler	Bernice Graves	Then She Found Me	
2008 (8th)	Debra Winger	Abby Buchman	Rachel Getting Married	
2009 (9th)	Kim Basinger ‡	Gina	The Burning Plain	
2009 (9th)	Judi Dench	Liliane La Fleur	Nine	
2009 (9th)	Marcia Gay Harden	Brooke Cavendar	Whip It	
2009 (9th)	Susan Sarandon	Grandma Lynn	The Lovely Bones	
2009 (9th)	Imelda Staunton	Sonia Teichberg	Taking Woodstock	

=== 2010s ===
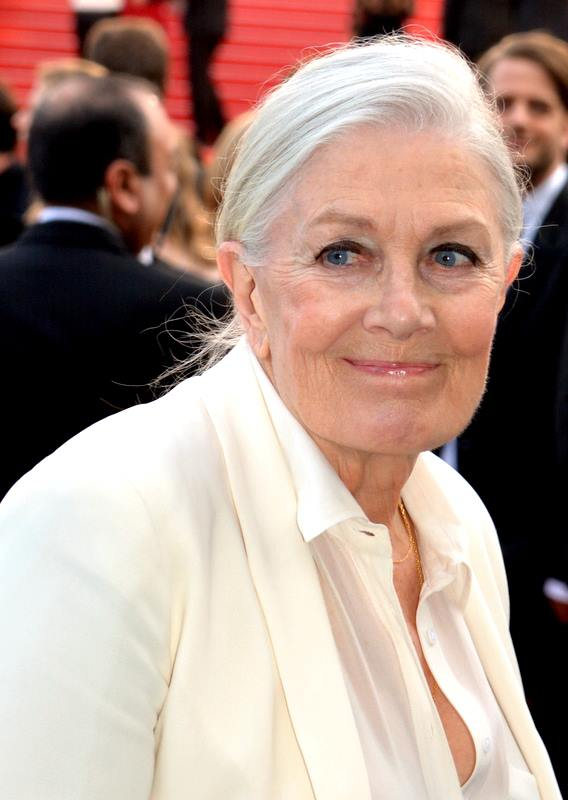
Vanessa Redgrave was the first solo winner born outside the United States.

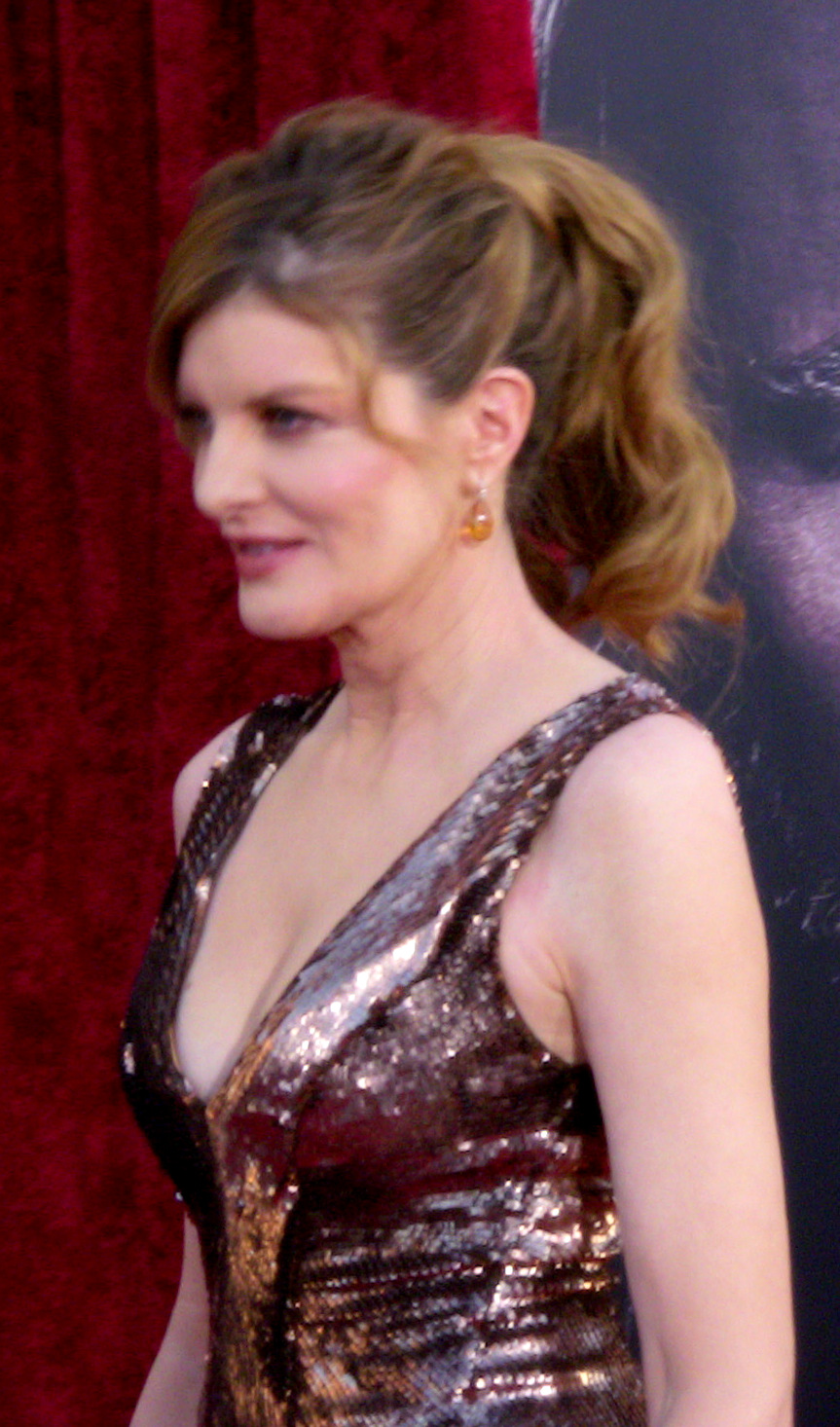
Rene Russo's win for Nightcrawler was her first professional award besides a win for Best Kiss at the Blockbuster Entertainment Awards.

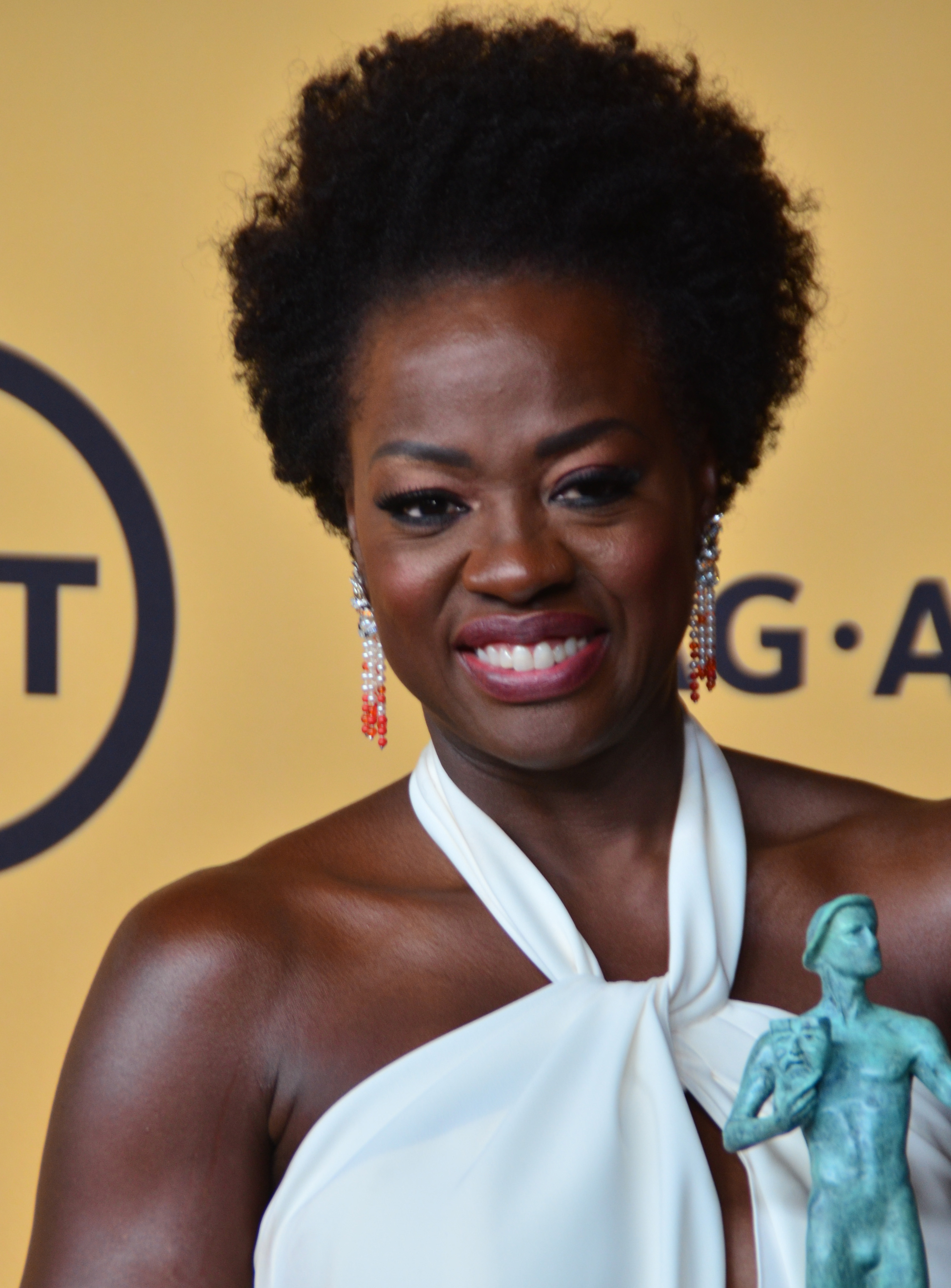
At 51 years old, Viola Davis's win for Fences made her the youngest recipient of Best Supporting Actress to date.

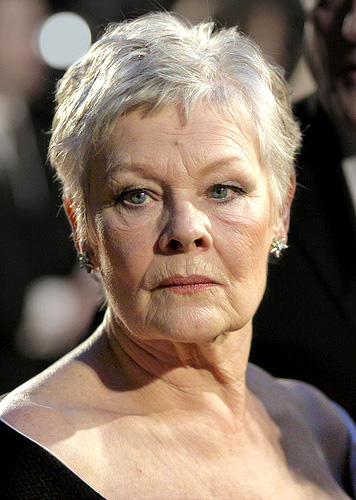
In addition to her three nominations and one win for Supporting Actress, Judi Dench has seven nominations and two wins for Best Actress.

Year	Actress	Role(s)	Film	Ref.
2010 (10th)	Phylicia Rashad ‡	Gilda ("Lady in Black")	For Colored Girls	
2010 (10th)	Gemma Jones	Helena Shepridge	You Will Meet a Tall Dark Stranger	
2010 (10th)	Diane Keaton	Colleen Peck	Morning Glory	
2010 (10th)	Melissa Leo	Alice Eklund-Ward	The Fighter	
2010 (10th)	Sissy Spacek	Mattie Darrow	Get Low	
2011 (11th)	Vanessa Redgrave ‡	Volumnia	Coriolanus	
2011 (11th)	Ellen Burstyn	Doris	Another Happy Day	
2011 (11th)	Judi Dench	Anna Marie Hoover	J. Edgar	
2011 (11th)	Allison Janney	Charlotte Phelan	The Help	
2011 (11th)	Janet McTeer	Hubert Page	Albert Nobbs	
2012 (12th)	Jacki Weaver ‡	Dolores Solitano	Silver Linings Playbook	
2012 (12th)	Sally Field	Mary Todd Lincoln	Lincoln	
2012 (12th)	Catherine Keener	Juliette Gelbart	A Late Quartet	
2012 (12th)	Shirley MacLaine	Marjorie "Margie" Nugent	Bernie	
2012 (12th)	Frances McDormand	Sue Thomason	Promised Land	
2013 (13th)	Oprah Winfrey ‡	Gloria Gaines	Lee Daniels' The Butler	
2013 (13th)	Allison Janney	Betty Thompson	The Way Way Back	
2013 (13th)	Margo Martindale	Mattie Fae Aiken	August: Osage County	
2013 (13th)	Julianne Moore	Esther	Don Jon	
2013 (13th)	June Squibb	Kate Grant	Nebraska	
2014 (14th)	Rene Russo ‡	Nina Romina	Nightcrawler	
2014 (14th)	Laura Dern	Bobbi Grey	Wild	
2014 (14th)	Susan Sarandon	Florence Aadland	The Last of Robin Hood	
2014 (14th)	Meryl Streep	The Witch	Into the Woods	
2014 (14th)	Marisa Tomei	Kate Hull	Love is Strange	
2015 (15th)	Diane Ladd ‡	Mimi	Joy	
2015 (15th)	Joan Allen	Nancy Newsome	Room	
2015 (15th)	Jane Fonda	Brenda Morel	Youth	
2015 (15th)	Helen Mirren	Hedda Hopper	Trumbo	
2015 (15th)	Cynthia Nixon	Gail White	James White	
2016 (16th)	Viola Davis ‡	Rose Lee Maxson	Fences	
2016 (16th)	Nicole Kidman	Sue Brierly	Lion	
2016 (16th)	Helen Mirren	Col. Katherine Powell	Eye in the Sky	
2016 (16th)	Molly Shannon	Joanne Mulcahey	Other People	
2016 (16th)	Sigourney Weaver	Mrs. Clayton / Grandma	A Monster Calls	
2017 (17th)	Laurie Metcalf ‡	Marion McPherson	Lady Bird	
2017 (17th)	Holly Hunter	Beth Gardner	The Big Sick	
2017 (17th)	Allison Janney	LaVona Golden	I, Tonya	
2017 (17th)	Melissa Leo	Reverend Mother Marie Saint-Clair	Novitiate	
2017 (17th)	Lesley Manville	Cyril Woodcock	Phantom Thread	
2018 (18th)	Judi Dench ‡	Anne Hathaway	All Is True	
2018 (18th)	Angela Bassett	Ramonda	Black Panther	
2018 (18th)	Blythe Danner	Ruth Everhardt	What They Had	
2018 (18th)	Nicole Kidman	Nancy Eamons	Boy Erased	
2018 (18th)	Michelle Yeoh	Eleanor Sung-Young	Crazy Rich Asians	
2019 (19th)	Laura Dern ‡	Nora Fanshaw	Marriage Story	
2019 (19th)	Nicole Kidman	Gretchen Carlson	Bombshell	
2019 (19th)	Jennifer Lopez	Ramona Vega	Hustlers	
2019 (19th)	Maggie Smith	Violet Crawley, Dowager Countess of Grantham	Downton Abbey	
2019 (19th)	Zhao Shu-zhen	Nai Nai	The Farewell	

=== 2020s ===
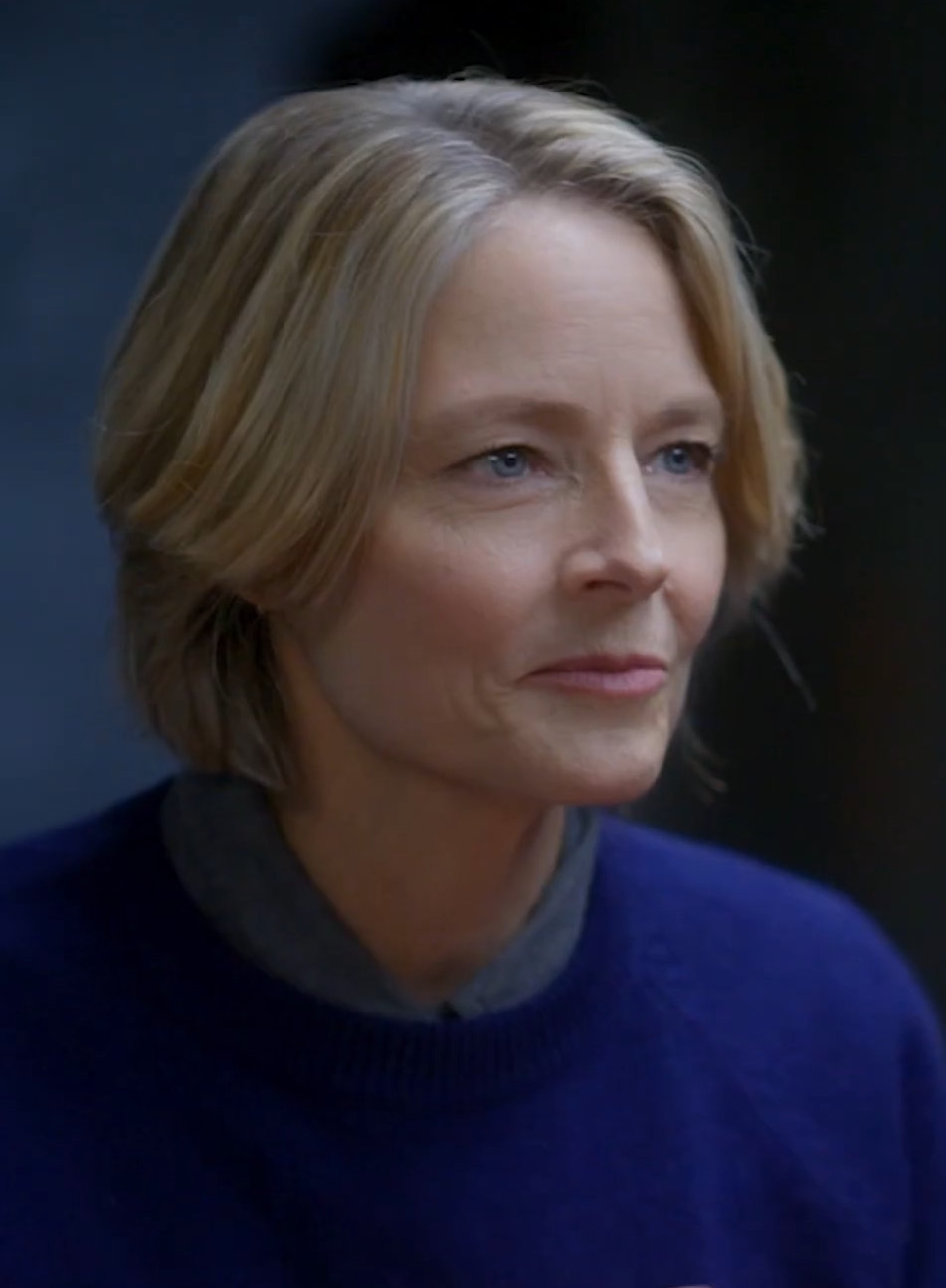
Jodie Foster won twice for her performances in The Mauritanian (2020) and Nyad (2023), making her the most awarded woman in this category.

Year	Actor	Role(s)	Film	Ref.
2020 (20th)	Jodie Foster ‡	Nancy Hollander	The Mauritanian	
2020 (20th)	Candice Bergen	Roberta	Let Them All Talk	
2020 (20th)	Ellen Burstyn	Elizabeth Weiss	Pieces of a Woman	
2020 (20th)	Glenn Close	Bonnie "Mamaw" Vance	Hillbilly Elegy	
2020 (20th)	Youn Yuh-jung	Soon-ja	Minari	
2021 (21st)	Aunjanue Ellis-Taylor‡	Oracene "Brandy" Price	King Richard	
2021 (21st)	Cate Blanchett	Lilith Ritter	Nightmare Alley	
2021 (21st)	Judi Dench	Granny	Belfast	
2021 (21st)	Marlee Matlin	Jackie Rossi	CODA	
2021 (21st)	Rita Moreno	Valentina	West Side Story	
2022 (22nd)	Judith Ivey‡	Agata	Women Talking	
2022 (22nd)	Angela Bassett	Ramonda	Black Panther: Wakanda Forever	
2022 (22nd)	Patricia Clarkson	Rebecca Corbett	She Said	
2022 (22nd)	Jamie Lee Curtis	Deirdre Beaubeirdre	Everything Everywhere All at Once	
2022 (22nd)	Gabrielle Union	Inez French	The Inspection	
2023 (23rd)	Jodie Foster‡	Bonnie Stoll	Nyad	
2023 (23rd)	Viola Davis	Deloris Jordan	Air	
2023 (23rd)	Taraji P. Henson	Shug Avery	The Color Purple	
2023 (23rd)	Julianne Moore	Gracie	May December	
2023 (23rd)	Leslie Uggams	Agnes Ellison	American Fiction	
2024 (24th)	Joan Chen‡	Chungsing Wang	Dìdi	
2024 (24th)	Aunjanue Ellis-Taylor	Hattie	Nickel Boys	
2024 (24th)	Lesley Manville	Dr. Cotter	Queer	
2024 (24th)	Connie Nielsen	Lucilla	Gladiator II	
2024 (24th)	Isabella Rossellini	Sister Agnes	Conclave	
2025 (25th)	Regina Hall‡	Deandra	One Battle After Another	
2025 (25th)	Amy Madigan	Gladys	Weapons	
2025 (25th)	Helen Mirren	June	Goodbye June	
2025 (25th)	Gwyneth Paltrow	Kay Stone	Marty Supreme	
2025 (25th)	Sigourney Weaver	Dr. Grace Augustine	Avatar: Fire and Ash	

== Actors with multiple wins and nominations ==
The following individuals received multiple Best Supporting Actress nominations:

=== Multiple wins ===
Wins	Actor
2	Jodie Foster

=== Multiple nominations ===
Nominations	Actress
4	Judi Dench
3	Allison Janney
3	Nicole Kidman
3	Helen Mirren
2	Angela Bassett
2	Ellen Burstyn
2	Viola Davis
2	Laura Dern
2	Jodie Foster
2	Melissa Leo
2	Julianne Moore
2	Vanessa Redgrave
2	Susan Sarandon
2	Sigourney Weaver

== Age superlatives ==
Record	Actress	Film	Age (in years)
Oldest winner	Ruby Dee	American Gangster	85
Oldest nominee	Ellen Burstyn	Pieces of a Woman	87
Youngest winner	Viola Davis	Fences	51
Youngest nominee	Nicole Kidman	Lion	49

== See also ==
- Academy Award for Best Supporting Actress
- BAFTA Award for Best Actress in a Supporting Role
- Broadcast Film Critics Association Award for Best Supporting Actress
- Golden Globe Award for Best Supporting Actress – Motion Picture
- Independent Spirit Award for Best Supporting Female
- Screen Actors Guild Award for Outstanding Performance by a Female Actor in a Supporting Role
