= AARP Movies for Grownups Award for Best Supporting Actor =

Annual US film award

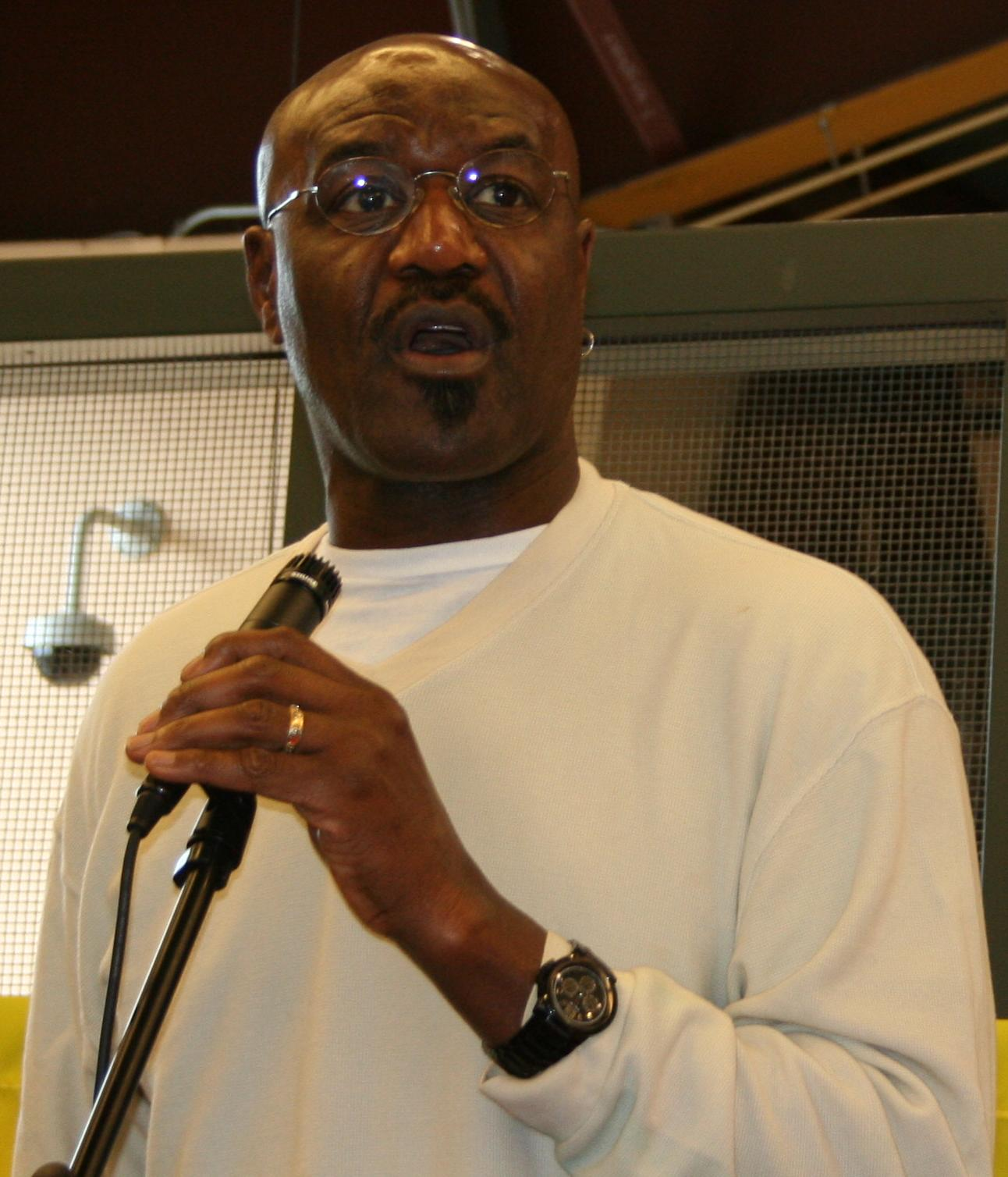
- The 2025 recipient: Delroy Lindo
- Awarded for: Best Performance by an Actor over 50 in a Supporting Role
- Country: United States
- Presented by: AARP
- First award: Tom Wilkinson for Michael Clayton (2007)
- Currently held by: Delroy Lindo for Sinners (2025)
- Website: https://www.aarp.org/entertainment/movies-for-grownups/

The AARP Movies for Grownups Award for Best Supporting Actor is one of the AARP Movies for Grownups Awards presented annually by the AARP. The award honors an actor over the age of 50 who has given an outstanding performance in a film in a given year. The awards for Supporting Actor and Supporting Actress were first given at the 7th AARP Movies for Grownups Awards in 2008. Prior to that, the only individual acting awards were for Best Actor and Best Actress.

== Winners and Nominees ==
indicates the winners.

=== 2000s ===
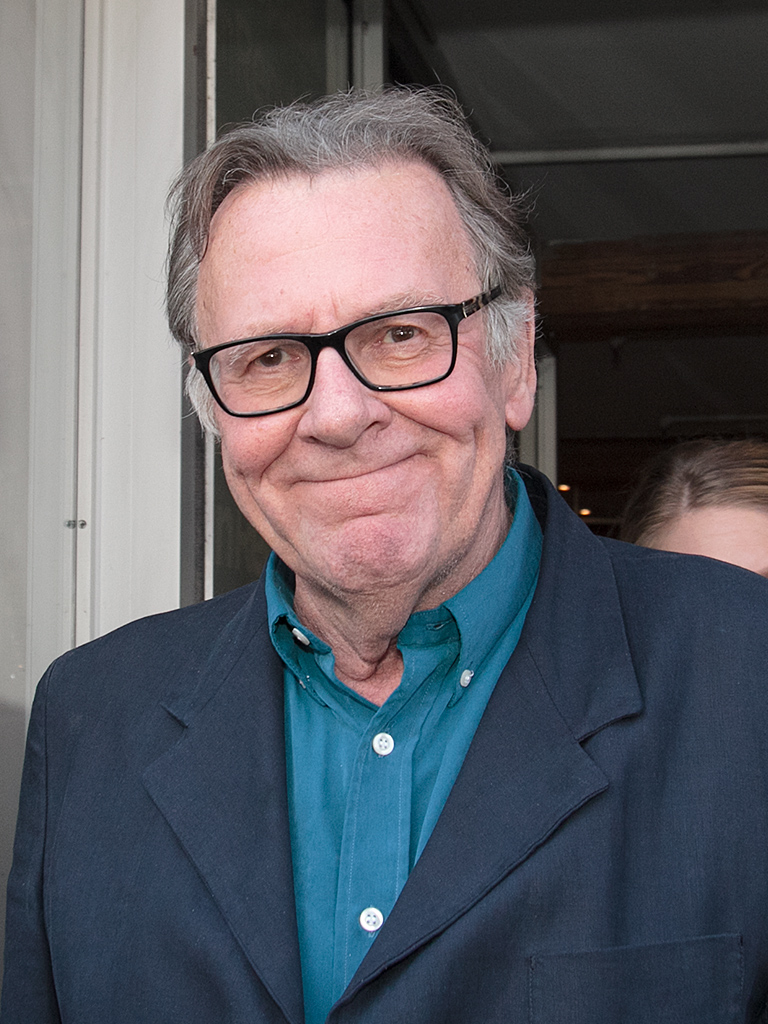
Tom Wilkinson won the inaugural Best Supporting Actor award for his performance in Michael Clayton.

Year	Actor	Role(s)	Film	Ref.
2007 (7th)	Tom Wilkinson	Arthur Edens	Michael Clayton	
2007 (7th)	Philip Bosco	Lenny Savage	The Savages	
2007 (7th)	Homayoun Ershadi	the Agha Sahib	The Kite Runner	
2007 (7th)	Andy Griffith	Joe	Waitress	
2007 (7th)	Hal Holbrook	Ron Franz	Into the Wild	
2008 (8th)	Bill Irwin	Paul Buchman	Rachel Getting Married	
2008 (8th)	Pierce Brosnan	Sam Carmichael	Mamma Mia!	
2008 (8th)	John Malkovich	Osbourne Cox	Burn After Reading	
2008 (8th)	Bill Murray	Mayor Cole	City of Ember	
2008 (8th)	Dennis Quaid	Ben Schwartzwalder	The Express: The Ernie Davis Story	
2009 (9th)	Alec Baldwin	Jacob "Jake" Adler	It's Complicated	
2009 (9th)	Eugene Levy	Max Yasgur	Taking Woodstock	
2009 (9th)	Alfred Molina	Jack Mellor	An Education	
2009 (9th)	Christopher Plummer	Leo Tolstoy	The Last Station	
2009 (9th)	John Travolta	Dennis "Ryder" Ford / Mr. Blue	The Taking of Pelham 123	

=== 2010s ===
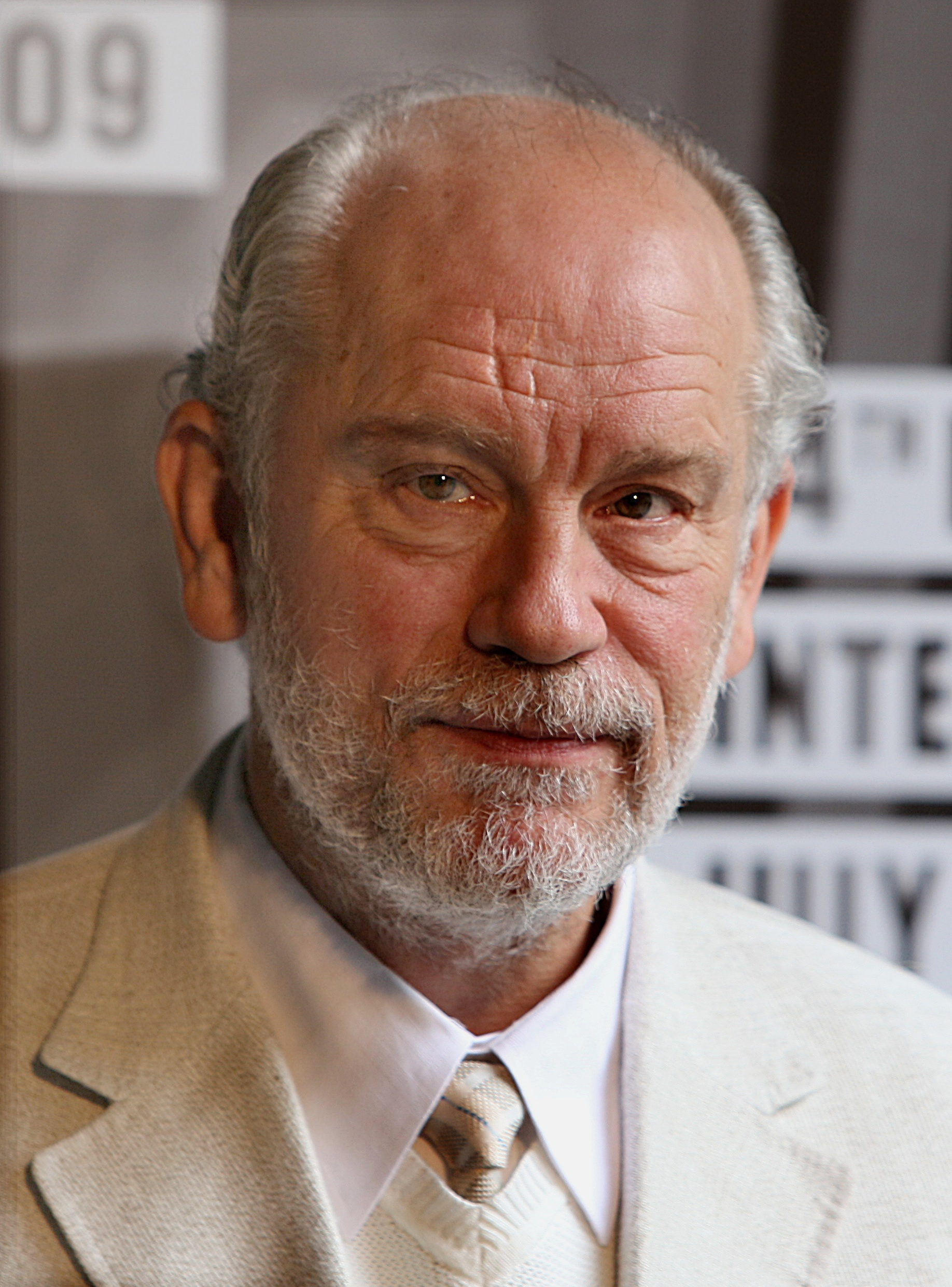
In Secretariat, John Malkovich became the first performer to win Best Supporting Actor for playing a real person.

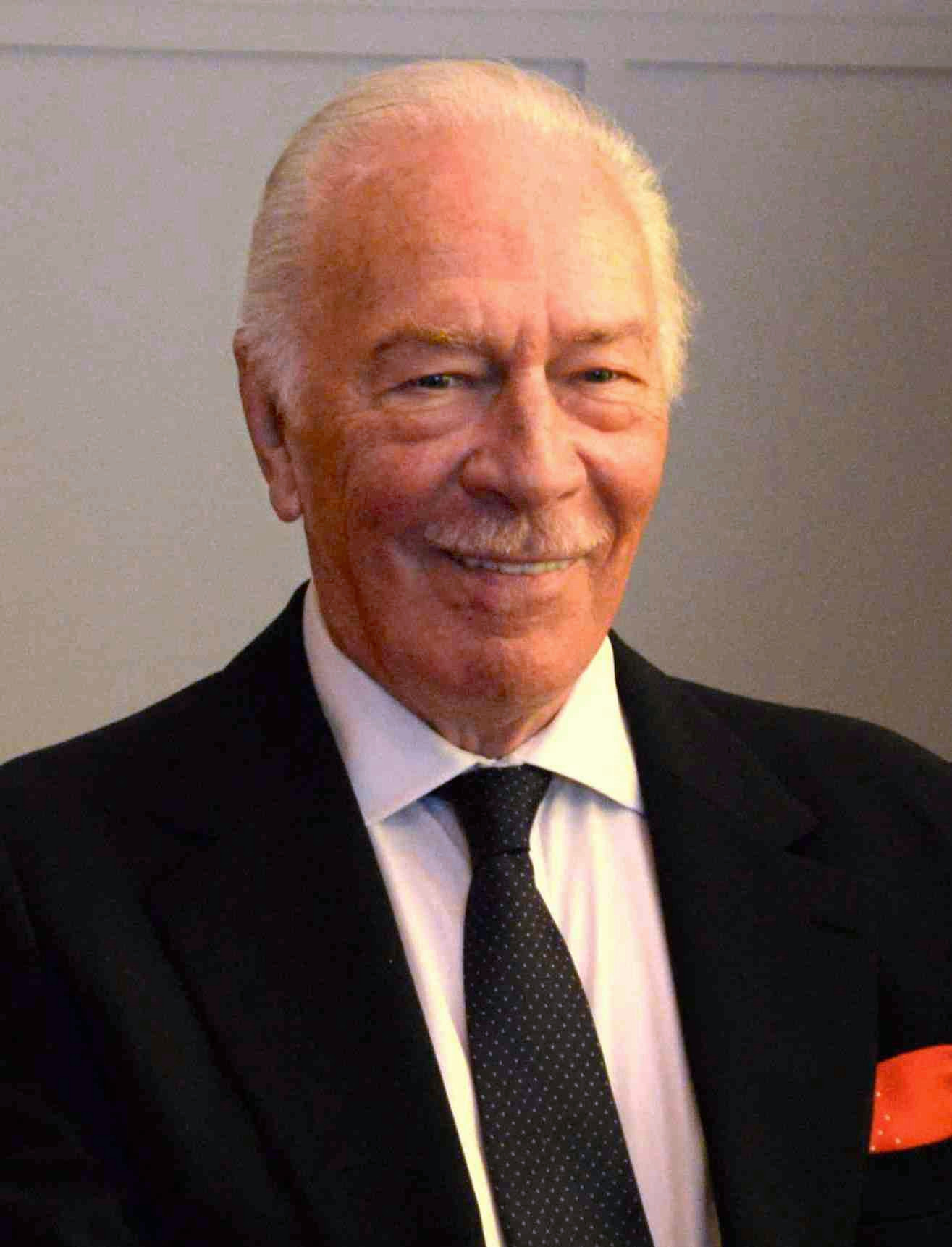
Christopher Plummer became the oldest winner for his performance in Beginners.

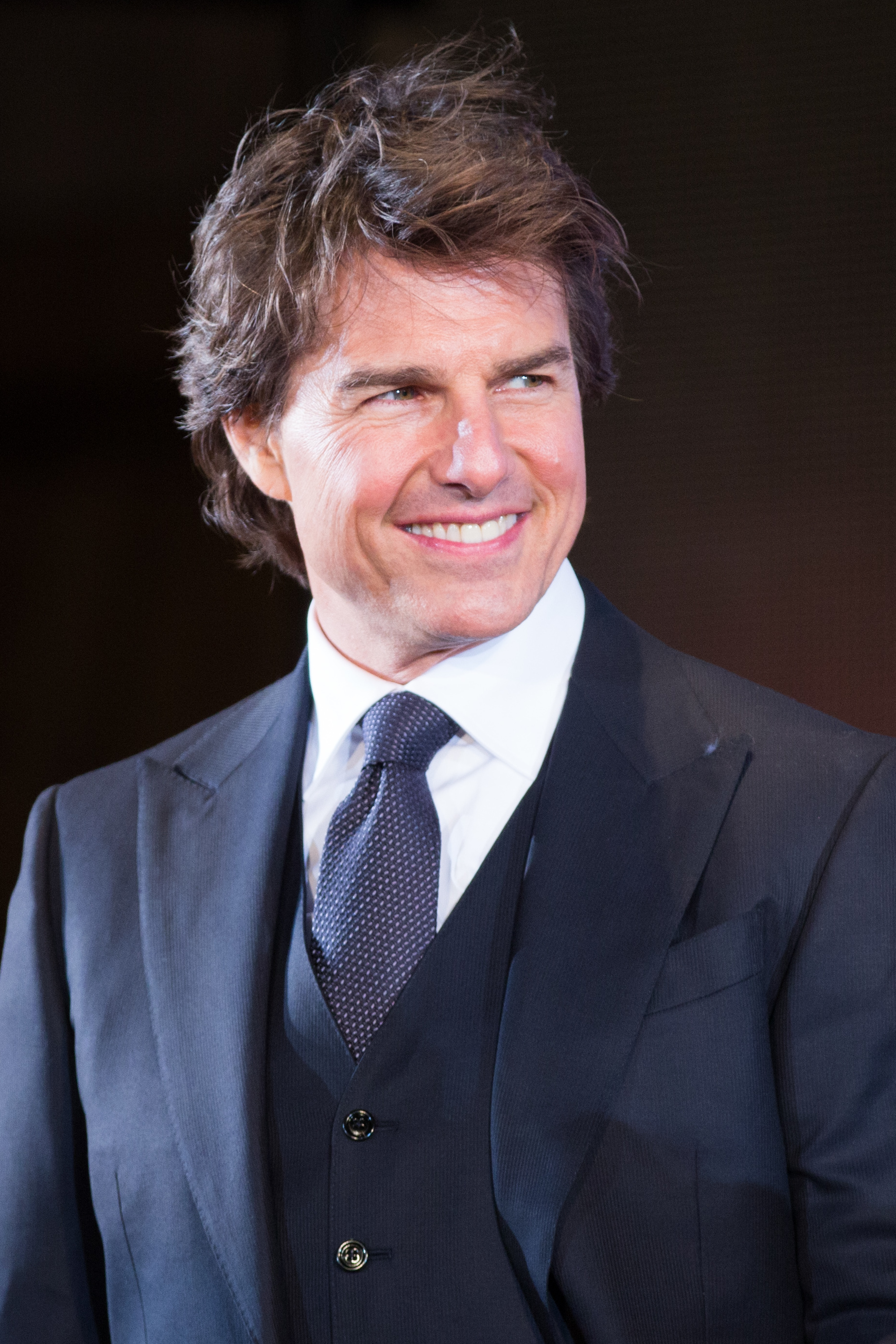
Tom Cruise is the youngest nominee to date. He was just 50 when he was recognized for his performance in Rock of Ages.

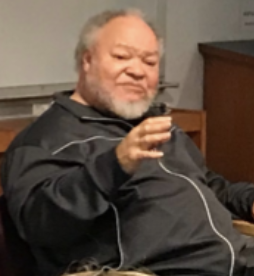
Stephen McKinley Henderson's performance in Fences made him the first Black actor to be recognized with a Best Supporting Actor nomination.

Year	Actor	Role(s)	Film	Ref.
2010 (10th)	John Malkovich	Lucien Laurin	Secretariat	
2010 (10th)	Kevin Costner	Jack Dolan	The Company Men	
2010 (10th)	Ben Kingsley	Dr. John Cawley	Shutter Island	
2010 (10th)	Bill Murray	Frank Quinn	Get Low	
2010 (10th)	Geoffrey Rush	Lionel Logue	The King's Speech	
2011 (11th)	Christopher Plummer	Hal Fields	Beginners	
2011 (11th)	Jeremy Irons	John Tuld	Margin Call	
2011 (11th)	Ben Kingsley	Georges Méliès	Hugo	
2011 (11th)	Max von Sydow	The Renter	Extremely Loud and Incredibly Close	
2011 (11th)	Christoph Waltz	August Rosenbluth	Water for Elephants	
2012 (12th)	John Goodman	Harling Mays	Flight	
2012 (12th)	Tom Cruise	Stacee Jaxx	Rock of Ages	
2012 (12th)	Robert De Niro	Patrizio "Pat" Solitano, Sr.	Silver Linings Playbook	
2012 (12th)	Tommy Lee Jones	Thaddeus Stevens	Lincoln	
2012 (12th)	Tom Wilkinson	Sir Graham Dashwood	The Best Exotic Marigold Hotel	
2013 (13th)	Chris Cooper	Charles Aiken, Sr.	August: Osage County	
2013 (13th)	Steve Carell	Trent Ramsey	The Way Way Back	
2013 (13th)	Tony Danza	Jon Martello, Sr.	Don Jon	
2013 (13th)	John Goodman	Roland Turner	Inside Llewyn Davis	
2013 (13th)	Bill Nighy	James Lake	About Time	
2014 (14th)	J. K. Simmons	Terence Fletcher	Whiplash	
2014 (14th)	Robert Duvall	Judge Joseph Palmer	The Judge	
2014 (14th)	John Goodman	Frank	The Gambler	
2014 (14th)	Don Johnson	Jim Bob Luke	Cold in July	
2014 (14th)	Christoph Waltz	Walter Keane	Big Eyes	
2015 (15th)	Mark Rylance	Rudolf Abel	Bridge of Spies	
2015 (15th)	Jeff Daniels	John Sculley	Steve Jobs	
2015 (15th)	Robert De Niro	Rudy Mangano	Joy	
2015 (15th)	Michael Keaton	Walter "Robbie" Robinson	Spotlight	
2015 (15th)	Sylvester Stallone	Robert "Rocky" Balboa	Creed	
2016 (16th)	Jeff Bridges	Marcus Hamilton	Hell or High Water	
2016 (16th)	Kevin Costner	Al Harrison	Hidden Figures	
2016 (16th)	Stephen McKinley Henderson	Jim Bono	Fences	
2016 (16th)	Issey Ogata	Inoue Masashige	Silence	
2016 (16th)	Timothy Spall	David Irving	Denial	
2017 (17th)	Richard Jenkins	Giles	The Shape of Water	
2017 (17th)	Willem Dafoe	Bobby Hicks	The Florida Project	
2017 (17th)	Laurence Fishburne	Richard Mueller	Last Flag Flying	
2017 (17th)	Woody Harrelson	Bill Willoughby	Three Billboards Outside Ebbing, Missouri	
2017 (17th)	Christopher Plummer	J. Paul Getty	All the Money in the World	
2018 (18th)	Richard E. Grant	Jack Hock	Can You Ever Forgive Me?	
2018 (18th)	Robert Duvall	Tom Mulligan	Widows	
2018 (18th)	Sam Elliott	Bobby Maine	A Star is Born	
2018 (18th)	Robert Forster	Norbert Everhardt	What They Had	
2018 (18th)	Ian McKellen	Earl of Southampton	All Is True	
2019 (19th)	Tom Hanks	Fred Rogers	A Beautiful Day in the Neighborhood	
2019 (19th)	Jamie Foxx	Walter McMillian	Just Mercy	
2019 (19th)	Anthony Hopkins	Pope Benedict XVI	The Two Popes	
2019 (19th)	Al Pacino	Jimmy Hoffa	The Irishman	
2019 (19th)	Brad Pitt	Cliff Booth	Once Upon a Time in Hollywood	

=== 2020s ===
Year	Actor	Role(s)	Film	Ref.
2020 (20th)	Demián Bichir	Miguel Borrás	Land	
2020 (20th)	Bill Murray	Felix Keane	On the Rocks	
2020 (20th)	Clarke Peters	Otis	Da 5 Bloods	
2020 (20th)	Paul Raci	Joe	Sound of Metal	
2020 (20th)	Mark Rylance	William Kunstler	The Trial of the Chicago 7	
2021 (21st)	Jared Leto	Paolo Gucci	House of Gucci	
2021 (21st)	Ciarán Hinds	"Pop"	Belfast	
2021 (21st)	J.K. Simmons	William Frawley	Being the Ricardos	
2021 (21st)	Timothy Spall	Equerry Major Alistair Gregory	Spencer	
2021 (21st)	David Strathairn	Pete Krumbein	Nightmare Alley	
2022 (22nd)	Judd Hirsch	Boris Podgorny	The Fabelmans	
2022 (22nd)	Andre Braugher	Dean Baquet	She Said	
2022 (22nd)	Brendan Gleeson	Colm Doherty	The Banshees of Inisherin	
2022 (22nd)	Woody Harrelson	sjökapten	Triangle of Sadness	
2022 (22nd)	Ke Huy Quan	Waymond Wang	Everything Everywhere All at Once	
2023 (23rd)	Robert De Niro	William King Hale	Killers of the Flower Moon	
2023 (23rd)	Willem Dafoe	Dr. Godwin Baxter	Poor Things	
2023 (23rd)	Colman Domingo	Albert "Mister" Johnson	The Color Purple	
2023 (23rd)	Robert Downey Jr.	Lewis Strauss	Oppenheimer	
2023 (23rd)	Mark Ruffalo	Duncan Wedderburn	Poor Things	
2024 (24th)	Peter Sarsgaard	Roone Arledge	September 5	
2024 (24th)	Clarence Maclin	Himself	Sing Sing	
2024 (24th)	Guy Pearce	Harrison Lee Van Buren	The Brutalist	
2024 (24th)	Stanley Tucci	Cardinal Aldo Bellini	Conclave	
2024 (24th)	Denzel Washington	Macrinus	Gladiator II	
2025 (25th)	Delroy Lindo	Delta Slim	Sinners	
2025 (25th)	Benicio del Toro	Sergio St. Carlos	One Battle After Another	
2025 (25th)	Sean Penn	Colonel Steven J. Lockjaw	One Battle After Another	
2025 (25th)	Michael Shannon	Robert H. Jackson	Nuremberg	
2025 (25th)	Stellan Skarsgård	Gustav Borg	Sentimental Value	

== Actors with multiple nominations ==
The following individuals received multiple Best Supporting Actor nominations:

Nominations	Actor
3	Robert De Niro
3	John Goodman
3	Bill Murray
3	Christopher Plummer
2	Kevin Costner
2	Willem Dafoe
2	Robert Duvall
2	Woody Harrelson
2	Ben Kingsley
2	John Malkovich
2	Mark Rylance
2	J.K. Simmons
2	Timothy Spall
2	Christoph Waltz
2	Tom Wilkinson

== Age superlatives ==
Record	Actor	Film	Age (in years)
Oldest winner	Judd Hirsch	The Fabelmans	87
Oldest nominee	Christopher Plummer	All the Money in the World	88
Youngest winner	Alec Baldwin	It's Complicated	51
Youngest nominee	Jared Leto	House of Gucci	50

== See also ==
- Academy Award for Best Supporting Actor
- BAFTA Award for Best Actor in a Supporting Role
- Broadcast Film Critics Association Award for Best Supporting Actor
- Golden Globe Award for Best Supporting Actor – Motion Picture
- Independent Spirit Award for Best Supporting Male
- Screen Actors Guild Award for Outstanding Performance by a Male Actor in a Supporting Role
