= The Intern (2015 film) =

2015 film by Nancy Meyers

- Theatrical release poster
- Directed by: Nancy Meyers
- Written by: Nancy Meyers
- Produced by: Nancy Meyers; Suzanne Farwell
- Starring: Robert De Niro; Anne Hathaway; Rene Russo
- Cinematography: Stephen Goldblatt
- Edited by: Robert Leighton
- Music by: Theodore Shapiro
- Production companies: RatPac-Dune Entertainment; Waverly Films
- Distributed by: Warner Bros. Pictures
- Release date: September 25, 2015
- Running time: 121 minutes
- Country: United States
- Language: English
- Budget: $35 million
- Box office: $197.1 million

The Intern is a 2015 American comedy drama film directed, written and co-produced by Nancy Meyers. The film stars Robert De Niro, Anne Hathaway and Rene Russo.

The plot follows a 70-year-old widower who becomes a senior intern at a fashion website, where he forms an unlikely friendship with the company's workaholic CEO.

The Intern was released on September 25, 2015, by Warner Bros. Pictures. The film received mixed reviews from critics, though De Niro and Hathaway's performances were praised, and grossed $197 million worldwide against a $35 million production budget.

== Plot ==
Seventy-year-old widower Ben Whittaker, a retired executive from Dex One, finds himself bored with retirement. He applies to fill the newly created position of senior intern at About the Fit, a fast-growing e-commerce fashion startup in Brooklyn.

Ben impresses everyone and is one of three interns hired. He is assigned to work with CEO Jules Ostin, who is somewhat skeptical at first and ignores him. However, Ben wins over his co-workers with his congeniality and his helpful advice on life and work.

One morning, Ben organizes a longtime messy desk that Jules has been agonizing about, winning her good graces. Later, looking out a window, he notices Jules's chauffeur drinking. Going outside, Ben persuades him to leave. Acting as her chauffeur, he drives Jules home.

The next day, Jules's driver does not show up, so Becky asks Ben to pick her up. When he asks Jules some personal questions, she asks her VP Cameron to reassign him. However, that evening, they bond when she discovers that he worked for almost 40 years in the same building that About the Fit now occupies. The next morning, Jules learns that Cameron has replaced Ben as her intern with Doris, a terrible driver who nearly crashes. Jules finds Ben and apologizes, begging him to come back, which he does.

Jules starts assigning Ben work, and he helps lighten her workload. He also begins a relationship with About the Fit's in-house massage therapist, Fiona. When Jules accidentally sends a scathing email about her mother to her mother, Ben volunteers to take some co-workers to break into her mother's house to delete it from her mother's computer. They narrowly avoid getting caught by the police in the process.

Ben becomes acquainted with Jules's family. Her husband Matt gave up his own very successful career to be a stay-at-home dad to their daughter, Paige, when her company started to take off. However, the marriage is slowly breaking apart as the couple grows more distant. When driving Paige home from a party, Ben discovers that Matt is having an affair.

Meanwhile, Jules is under pressure to give up her post as CEO to someone outside the company, as her investors fear that she is unable to cope with the unexpectedly high workload. Believing it will give her more time at home with her family, Jules gives in to the pressure. She has Ben accompany her on a business trip to San Francisco to interview a potential CEO candidate. While there, Jules reveals that she knows about Matt's infidelity, but has not confronted him about it, as she is not ready to deal with it.

To buy herself time to save her marriage, Jules decides to hire the prospective CEO, but Ben urges her to think about how much effort and passion she has used to build About the Fit. Matt unexpectedly drops in at Jules's office to try to persuade her to reconsider hiring a CEO as well. He also confesses to the infidelity, saying that the affair is over. Sorry and ashamed, Matt wants to support Jules in her dreams and get their marriage back on track.

Jules goes looking for Ben, wanting to tell him that she has changed her mind about hiring a CEO, but learns that he has taken the day off to enjoy his tai chi exercise group. She joins them and finally lets herself relax.

== Cast ==
- Robert De Niro as Benjamin "Ben" Whittaker (The Intern)
- Anne Hathaway as Jules Ostin
- Rene Russo as Fiona Farwell
- Anders Holm as Matt
- Adam DeVine as Jason
- Andrew Rannells as Cameron
- Linda Lavin as Patty
- Christina Scherer as Becky
- Celia Weston as Doris
- JoJo Kushner as Paige
- Zack Pearlman as Davis
- Jason Orley as Lewis

== Production ==
=== Development and casting ===
Originally set up at Paramount Pictures, The Intern was planned to feature Tina Fey and Michael Caine in the lead roles. Handed over to Warner Bros., Fey was replaced by Reese Witherspoon as the attached star, although Witherspoon left the film on January 15, 2014, due to scheduling conflicts. On February 7, 2014, Anne Hathaway was in final talks to replace Witherspoon in the lead role. Stephen Goldblatt was set as director of photography. On June 23, 2014, Zack Pearlman joined the cast of the film.

=== Filming ===
Principal photography began on June 23, 2014, in Brooklyn, New York City, where De Niro was spotted on the set of the film. Cinematography was by Stephen Goldblatt.

On October 2, 2014, director Nancy Meyers announced that filming was completed.

=== Credits ===
The film was written and directed by Nancy Meyers, and co-produced by Meyers and Suzanne Farwell through RatPac-Dune Entertainment and Waverly Films production studios.

The score was composed by Theodore Shapiro, with Nathan Matthew David writing additional music.

Robert Leighton edited the film.

== Reception ==
=== Box office ===
The Intern grossed $75.8 million in North America and $121.4 million in other territories for a worldwide total of $197.1 million, against a net production budget of $35 million. The film opened alongside Hotel Transylvania 2 and was projected to gross $15–20 million in its opening weekend. It grossed $17.7 million, finishing second at the box office behind Hotel Transylvania 2 ($48.5 million).

=== Critical response ===
On the review aggregator website Rotten Tomatoes, 59% of 201 critics' reviews are positive, with an average rating of 5.7/10. The website's consensus reads: "The Intern doesn't do enough with its timely premise, but benefits from the unorthodox chemistry of its talented leads." Metacritic, which uses a weighted average, assigned the film a score of 51 out of 100, based on 36 critics, indicating "mixed or average" reviews.

Richard Roeper of the Chicago Sun-Times gave the film 3½ stars out of 4, stating, "With some genuinely insightful dialogue, a number of truly funny bits of physical business, and small scenes allowing us to get to know and like a half-dozen supporting players".

Manohla Dargis of The New York Times wrote that the film was similar to Meyers's other works, stating that it was "frothy, playful, homogeneous, routinely maddening and generally pretty irresistible". Despite criticizing Meyers's screenplay and "conflicted ideas about powerful women", Dargis praised the casting of De Niro, stating that he "owns the movie from the moment he opens his mouth". Hathaway's role was derided as "less of a character and more of a fast-walking, speed-talking collection of gender grievances".

Clem Bastow, writing for The Guardian, suggested that poor reviews for the film were primarily coming from men, who form the overwhelming majority of film critics. Bastow further suggested that female critics would "feel the need to go hard on certain films for women" such as The Intern.

Director Quentin Tarantino viewed the film as Oscar-worthy, stating:

It does seem to be to some degree there's a boom or bust aspect when it comes to Hollywood when it comes to female directors. There becomes an era when there's a lot working then that settles down and there's a dry period—but frankly, maybe I'm just talking shit because the thing is there are female directors. Maybe they're not being the ones that are being asked to be on The Hollywood Reporter roundtable. One of my favorite movies this last year was Nancy Meyers' The Intern. They're not considering that for the Oscars even though I think Robert De Niro gave one of the best performances this year in that movie. I thought the script was actually one of her best. Right up there with It's Complicated. They're not asking her to be part of the discussion.

=== Accolades ===
Year	Award	Category	Recipients	Result	Ref.
2016	AARP Movies for Grownups Awards	Best Comedy	The Intern	Won	
2016	Broadcast Film Critics Association Awards	Best Actor in a Comedy	Robert De Niro	Nominated	
2016	Critics' Choice Movie Awards	Best Actor in a Comedy	Robert De Niro	Nominated	
2016	Casting Society of America	Casting - Big Budget Feature - Comedy	The Intern	Nominated	
2016	Jupiter Award, Germany	Best International Actor	Robert De Niro	Nominated	
2016	Jupiter Award, Germany	Best International Actress	Anne Hathaway	Nominated	
2016	Max Movie Awards, South Korea	Best Actress	Anne Hathaway	Nominated	
2016	Teen Choice Awards	Choice Movie: Comedy	Nancy Meyers	Nominated	
2016	Teen Choice Awards	Choice Movie Actress: Comedy	Anne Hathaway	Nominated	

== Remakes ==
On February 27, 2020, Bollywood actress Deepika Padukone announced that she would produce a Hindi remake of The Intern, also playing the female lead role. However, production was postponed due to the COVID-19 pandemic. Rishi Kapoor was initially cast as the male lead, but after his sudden death in April 2020 due to leukemia, he was replaced by Amitabh Bachchan in March 2021. Principal photography began in November 2021. In August 2025, it was announced that Padukone would not be acting in the film, to allow her to focus on production, and a new female lead was being sought.

On July 5, 2022, the first episode of the Japanese television remake of The Intern, called Unicorn ni Notte or Riding a Unicorn, was released. It features Hidetoshi Nishijima in the De Niro role and Mei Nagano in the Hathaway role.

Jack Nguyen and his newly established Joat Films announced that he and Warner Bros., together with Anthology Studios, would co-produce the upcoming Korean adaptation titled The Intern. Choi Min-sik and Han So-hee were confirmed for the lead roles in the remake, which started production in September 2025. On August 4, 2026, Warner Bros. Korea released the first teaser trailer and poster, confirming the Korean title as 인턴 and scheduling its South Korean theatrical release for September 16, 2026.
