= 14th AARP Movies for Grownups Awards =

Film award ceremony

- Date: January 2015

Highlights
- Most nominations: Love is Strange (5)

The 14th AARP Movies for Grownups Awards, presented by AARP the Magazine, honored films released in 2014 made by and for people over the age of 50. The awards were announced by the magazine on January 10, 2015, with the winners recognized at a ceremony hosted by John Leguizamo at the Beverly Wilshire Hotel on February 2. Israel Horovitz won the award for Breakthrough Achievement for his directorial debut, My Old Lady, and Kevin Costner won the Career Achievement Award.

== Awards ==
=== Winners and nominees ===
Winners are listed first, highlighted in boldface, and indicated with a double dagger (‡).

**Best Movie for Grownups**: **The Theory of Everything**‡; Birdman or (The Unexpected Virtue of Ignorance); Boyhood; The Imitation Game; Love is Strange	**Best Director**: **Richard Linklater – Boyhood**‡; Clint Eastwood - American Sniper; Alejandro González Iñárritu - Birdman or (The Unexpected Virtue of Ignorance); James Marsh - The Theory of Everything; Ira Sachs - Love is Strange
**Best Actor**: **Steve Carell - Foxcatcher**‡; Michael Keaton - Birdman or (The Unexpected Virtue of Ignorance); John Lithgow - Love is Strange; Bill Murray - St. Vincent; Al Pacino - The Humbling	**Best Actress**: **Julianne Moore - Still Alice**‡; Lindsay Duncan - Le Week-End; Jane Fonda - This is Where I Leave You; Diane Keaton - And So It Goes; Maggie Smith - My Old Lady
**Best Supporting Actor**: **J.K. Simmons - Whiplash**‡; Robert Duvall - The Judge; John Goodman - The Gambler; Don Johnson - Cold in July; Christoph Waltz - Big Eyes	**Best Supporting Actress**: **Rene Russo - Nightcrawler**‡; Susan Sarandon - The Last of Robin Hood; Meryl Streep - Into the Woods; Marisa Tomei - Love is Strange; Laura Dern - Wild
**Best Comedy**: **Chef**‡; Land Ho!; St. Vincent; This is Where I Leave You; Le Week-End	**Best Screenwriter**: **Nick Hornby and Cheryl Strayed - Wild**‡; Alejandro González Iñárritu - Birdman or (The Unexpected Virtue of Ignorance); James Lapine - Into the Woods; Richard Linklater - Boyhood; Anthony McCarten - The Theory of Everything
**Best Time Capsule**: **Big Eyes (1960s)**‡; Get on Up (1950s-70s); Jersey Boys (1960s); Selma (1965)	**Best Intergenerational Film**: **St. Vincent**‡; Chef; The Judge; This is Where I Leave You
**Best Grownup Love Story**: **John Lithgow & Alfred Molina - Love is Strange**‡; Diane Keaton & Michael Douglas - And So It Goes; Helen Mirren & Om Puri - The Hundred-Foot Journey; Kristin Scott Thomas & Kevin Kline - My Old Lady; Lindsay Duncan & Jim Broadbent - Le Week-End	**Best Buddy Picture**: **Land Ho!**‡
**Best Movie for Grownups Who Refuse to Grow Up**: **The Lego Movie**‡; Big Hero 6; Maleficent; Muppets Most Wanted; Night at the Museum: Secret of the Tomb	**Best Documentary**: **Keep On Keepin' On**‡; Advanced Style; Glen Campbell: I'll Be Me; Perfect Strangers; The Trials of Muhammad Ali
**Best Foreign Film**: **Diplomacy - France & Cinema of Germany**‡; The Admiral: Roaring Currents - South Korea; Human Capital - Italy; Leviathan - Russia; Manakamana - Nepal	

=== Breakthrough Achievement ===
- Israel Horovitz: "A less confident first-timer might have balked at taking on Maggie Smith, Kevin Kline, and Kristin Scott Thomas, but Horovitz attacks the task like a veteran, managing to delicately balance strong performances by three of the screen's most accomplished actors."

==== We Also Loved ====
- Jon Stewart's debut, Rosewater

=== Career Achievement Award ===
- Kevin Costner

=== Films with multiple nominations ===
Films that received multiple nominations
Nominations	Film
5	Love is Strange
4	Birdman or (The Unexpected Virtue of Ignorance)
3	Boyhood
3	Le Week-End
3	St. Vincent
3	The Theory of Everything
3	This Is Where I Leave You
2	And So It Goes
2	Big Eyes
2	Chef
2	Into the Woods
2	The Judge
2	Land Ho!
2	My Old Lady
2	Wild
