= 1st AARP Movies for Grownups Awards =

Film award ceremony

- Date: May 2002

Highlights
- Best Movie for Grownups: Lantana
- Most nominations: In the Bedroom and Gosford Park (tie) (3)

The 1st AARP Movies for Grownups Awards, presented by AARP the Magazine, honored films released in 2001 made by and for people over the age of 50. The awards were announced in the May/June issue of AARP the Magazine, which had recently been created by merging AARP's previous magazines, Modern Maturity and My Generation into one publication.

The awards were created by editor Bill Newcott after My Generation discontinued its movie review column due to a lack of films targeted to a 50-plus audience. The goal, according to AARP, was to encourage Hollywood to make films for older adults by rewarding the best examples of the genre. Winners and nominees in seven categories were announced simultaneously in the magazine, and were selected by an advisory board including Newcott and critics from Time, ABC, TV Guide Online, and USA Today. As in other years before the establishment of an in-person ceremony, winners were mailed trophies of a gold theater seat called La Chaise d'Or.

== Awards ==
=== Winners and Nominees ===
Winners are listed first, highlighted in boldface, and indicated with a double dagger (‡).

**Best Movie for Grownups**: **Lantana**‡; A Beautiful Mind; In the Bedroom; Iris	**Best Director**: **Robert Altman – Gosford Park**‡; Michael Mann - Ali; Tony Scott - Spy Game; Ridley Scott - Black Hawk Down
**Best Actor**: **Tom Wilkinson - In the Bedroom**‡; Morgan Freeman - Along Came a Spider; Gene Hackman - The Royal Tenenbaums	**Best Actress**: **Charlotte Rampling - Under the Sand**‡; Helen Mirren - Gosford Park; Maggie Smith - Gosford Park; Sissy Spacek - In the Bedroom
**Best Documentary**: **Fighter**‡	**Best Foreign Film**: **Under the Sand - France**‡
**Best Movie for Grownups Who Refuse to Grow Up**: **Shrek**‡

=== Best/Worst Awards ===
- Best Treatment of a Delicate Subject: Iris
- Worst Treatment of a Delicate Subject: Freddy Got Fingered
- Best Old-Age Makeup: Russell Crowe in A Beautiful Mind
- Worst Old-Age Makeup: Jennifer Connelly in A Beautiful Mind
- Best Over-60 Romance Movie: Innocence "for having the guts to try it"
- Worst Over-60 Romance Movie: Innocence "Er, now let's try it in a good movie."
- Best Role Model: David Kelly in Greenfingers
- Worst Role Model: Ben Kingsley in Sexy Beast
- Best Grandparent: Julie Andrews in The Princess Diaries
- Worst Grandparents: Liliane Rovère and Dominique Rozan in With a Friend Like Harry
- Most Athletic Performance: Morgan Freeman in Along Came a Spider
- Least Athletic Performance: Marlon Brando in The Score

=== Films with multiple nominations ===
Films that received multiple nominations
Nominations	Film
3	Gosford Park
3	In the Bedroom
2	Under the Sand
