= 3rd AARP Movies for Grownups Awards =

Film award ceremony

- Date: March/April 2004

Highlights
- Most awards: Something's Gotta Give (2)
- Most nominations: A Mighty Wind (5)

The 3rd AARP Movies for Grownups Awards, presented by AARP the Magazine, honored films released in 2003 made by people over the age of 50. As it was customary for the awards at this point, there was no awards ceremony; instead, the winners were announced in 2004's March/April issue of the magazine. Eugene Levy won the award for Breakaway Performance for A Mighty Wind.

== Awards ==
=== Winners and Nominees ===
Winners are listed first, highlighted in boldface, and indicated with a double dagger (‡).

**Best Movie for Grownups**: **Mystic River**‡; House of Sand and Fog; Lost in Translation; A Mighty Wind; Seabiscuit	**Best Director**: **Joel Schumacher – Phone Booth**‡; Clint Eastwood - Mystic River; Alan Rudolph - The Secret Lives of Dentists; Ridley Scott - Matchstick Men; Jim Sheridan - In America
**Best Actor**: **Bill Murray - Lost in Translation**‡; Albert Finney - Big Fish; Anthony Hopkins - The Human Stain; Tommy Lee Jones - The Missing; Ben Kingsley - House of Sand and Fog	**Best Actress**: **Diane Keaton - Something's Gotta Give**‡; Geraldine McEwan - The Magdalene Sisters; Helen Mirren - Calendar Girls; Catherine O'Hara - A Mighty Wind
**Best Screenwriter**: **Jim Sheridan - In America**‡; Nancy Meyers - Something's Gotta Give; Anthony Minghella - Cold Mountain; John Sayles - Casa de los Babys	**Best Time Capsule**: **Down with Love**‡; A Mighty Wind; Seabiscuit
**Best Intergenerational Film**: **Secondhand Lions**‡; Bend It Like Beckham; In America; Whale Rider	**Best Grownup Love Story**: **Diane Keaton and Jack Nicholson - Something's Gotta Give**‡; Emma Thompson and Alan Rickman - Love Actually; Eugene Levy and Catherine O'Hara - A Mighty Wind
**Best Movie for Grownups Who Refuse to Grow Up**: **School of Rock**‡; Finding Nemo; Kill Bill: Volume 1	**Best TV Movie**: **Angels in America**; My House in Umbria
**Best Documentary**: **Concert for George**‡; Blind Spot: Hitler's Secretary; The Fog of War	**Best Foreign Film**: **Nowhere in Africa - Germany**‡; Autumn Spring - Czech Republic; The Barbarian Invasions - Canada; Russian Ark - Russia

=== Breakaway Performance ===
- Eugene Levy: "Who'da thunk that Levy — whose characters on TV and in some 40 movies served as poster boys for the clueless unhip — would turn in this nuanced performance as an emotionally damaged folk singer? Oh, but don't get us wrong—he's as funny as ever, too."

==== Runners Up ====
- Michael Caine for Secondhand Lions
- Kurt Russell for Dark Blue

=== Films with multiple nominations and wins ===
Films that received multiple nominations
Nominations	Film
5	A Mighty Wind
3	In America
3	Something's Gotta Give
2	House of Sand and Fog
2	Lost in Translation
2	Mystic River
2	Seabiscuit
2	Secondhand Lions

Films that received multiple awards
Wins	Film
2	Something's Gotta Give
