= 19th AARP Movies for Grownups Awards =

Film award ceremony

- Announced on: November 26, 2019
- Presented on: January 11, 2020
- Site: Beverly Wilshire
- Hosted by: Tony Danza

Highlights
- Most awards: A Beautiful Day in the Neighborhood, The Irishman, Marriage Story (2)
- Most nominations: The Two Popes (7)

Television coverage
- Network: PBS

The 19th AARP Movies for Grownups Awards, presented by AARP the Magazine, honored films released in 2019 and were announced on November 26, 2019. The awards recognized films created by and about people over the age of 50. The ceremony on January 11, 2020 was hosted by actor Tony Danza, and was broadcast on PBS as part of its Great Performances series.

== Awards ==
=== Winners and Nominees ===
Winners are listed first, highlighted in boldface, and indicated with a double dagger (‡).

**Best Movie for Grownups**: **The Irishman**‡; Bombshell; A Beautiful Day in the Neighborhood; The Farewell; Little Women; Marriage Story; Once Upon a Time in Hollywood; The Two Popes	**Best Director**: **Martin Scorsese – The Irishman**‡; Noah Baumbach - Marriage Story; Fernando Meirelles - The Two Popes; Sam Mendes - 1917; Quentin Tarantino - Once Upon a Time in Hollywood
**Best Actor**: **Adam Sandler - Uncut Gems**‡; Antonio Banderas - Pain and Glory; Robert De Niro - The Irishman; Eddie Murphy - Dolemite Is My Name; Jonathan Pryce - The Two Popes	**Best Actress**: **Renée Zellweger - Judy**‡; Isabelle Huppert - Frankie; Helen Mirren - The Good Liar; Julianne Moore - Gloria Bell; Alfre Woodard - Clemency
**Best Supporting Actor**: **Tom Hanks - A Beautiful Day in the Neighborhood**‡; Jamie Foxx - Just Mercy; Anthony Hopkins - The Two Popes; Al Pacino - The Irishman; Brad Pitt - Once Upon a Time in Hollywood	**Best Supporting Actress**: **Laura Dern - Marriage Story**‡; Nicole Kidman - Bombshell; Jennifer Lopez - Hustlers; Zhao Shuzhen - The Farewell; Maggie Smith - Downton Abbey
**Best Screenwriter**: **Noah Baumbach - Marriage Story**‡; Kasi Lemmons, Gregory Allen Howard - Harriet; Anthony McCarten - The Two Popes; Quentin Tarantino - Once Upon a Time in Hollywood; Steven Zaillian - The Irishman	**Best Ensemble**: **Knives Out**‡; Bombshell; Dolemite Is My Name; Downton Abbey; Little Women
**Best Intergenerational Film**: **The Farewell**‡; A Beautiful Day in the Neighborhood; Little Women; Parasite; The Etruscan Smile	**Best Buddy Picture**: A Beautiful Day in the Neighborhood; Ford v Ferrari; Just Mercy; The Lighthouse; The Two Popes
**Best Time Capsule**: **Harriet**‡; Judy; Little Women; Motherless Brooklyn; Once Upon a Time in Hollywood	**Readers Choice Poll**: **A Beautiful Day in the Neighborhood**‡; Bombshell; Downton Abbey; Joker; Little Women; Marriage Story; Once Upon a Time in Hollywood; Richard Jewell; The Irishman; The Two Popes
**Best Documentary**: **Linda Ronstadt: The Sound of My Voice**‡; Apollo 11; Ask Dr. Ruth; The Apollo; Toni Morrison: The Pieces I Am	**Best Foreign Language Film**: **Pain and Glory - Spain**‡; An Unexpected Love - Argentina; Parasite - South Korea; The Farewell - United States; The Unorthodox - Israel

=== Career Achievement Award ===
- Annette Bening, for being "fearlessly artistic" in making "films that have a resonant impact on our culture."

=== Films with multiple nominations and awards ===
Films that received multiple nominations
Nominations	Film
7	The Two Popes
6	The Irishman
6	Once Upon a Time in Hollywood
3	A Beautiful Day in the Neighborhood
3	Little Women
3	Marriage Story
4	Bombshell
3	Downton Abbey
3	The Farewell
3	Just Mercy
2	Dolemite Is My Name
2	Harriet
2	Judy

Films that received multiple awards
Wins	Film
2	A Beautiful Day in the Neighborhood
2	The Irishman
2	Marriage Story
