= AARP Movies for Grownups Award for Best Movie for Grownups =

Film award

- Awarded for: Best Movie by or about People over 50
- Location: United States
- Presented by: AARP
- Currently held by: Hamnet (2025)
- Website: www.aarp.org/entertainment/movies-for-grownups/

The AARP Movies for Grownups Award for Best Movie for Grownups is one of the AARP Movies for Grownups Awards presented annually by the AARP since the awards' inception in 2002. The award honors the best film in a given year made by or about people who are fifty years old or older. The Best Movie for Grownups Award is one of the seven original trophies issued by AARP the Magazine, along with awards for Best Director, Best Actor, Best Actress, Best Foreign Film, Best Documentary, and Best Movie for Grownups Who Refuse to Grow Up.

== Winners and Nominees ==
indicates the winners.

=== 2000s ===
Year	Film	Director	Producer/s
2001	Lantana	Ray Lawrence	Jan Chapman
2001	A Beautiful Mind	Ron Howard	Brian Grazer, Ron Howard
2001	In the Bedroom	Todd Field	Todd Field, Ross Katz, Graham Leader
2001	Iris	Richard Eyre	Robert Fox, Scott Rudin
2002	About Schmidt	Alexander Payne	Michael Besman, Harry Gittes
2002	Far from Heaven	Todd Haynes	Jody Allen, Christine Vachon
2002	The Hours	Stephen Daldry	Scott Rudin, Robert Fox
2002	The Quiet American	Phillip Noyce	Staffan Ahrenberg, William Horberg
2003	Mystic River	Clint Eastwood	Clint Eastwood, Robert Lorenz, Judie G. Hoyt
2003	House of Sand and Fog	Vadim Perelman	Vadim Perelman, Michael London
2003	Lost in Translation	Sofia Coppola	Ross Katz, Sofia Coppola
2003	A Mighty Wind	Christopher Guest	Karen Murphy
2003	Seabiscuit	Gary Ross	Kathleen Kennedy, Frank Marshall, Gary Ross, Jane Sindell
2004	Ray	Taylor Hackford	Taylor Hackford, Stuart Benjamin, Howard Baldwin, Karen Baldwin
2004	The Aviator	Martin Scorsese	Michael Mann, Sandy Climan, Graham King, Charles Evans Jr.
2004	In Good Company	Paul Weitz	Lawrence Pressman, Paul Weitz
2004	Kinsey	Bill Condon	Gail Mutrux
2004	The Notebook	Nick Cassavetes	Lynn Harris, Mark Johnson
2004	Sideways	Alexander Payne	Michael London
2005	Capote	Bennett Miller	Caroline Baron, William Vince, Michael Ohoven
2005	Cinderella Man	Ron Howard	Ron Howard, Penny Marshall, Brian Grazer
2005	Crash	Paul Haggis	Don Cheadle, Paul Haggis, Mark R. Harris, Bobby Moresco, Cathy Schulman, Bob Yari
2005	Good Night, and Good Luck	George Clooney	Grant Heslov
2005	Walk the Line	James Mangold	James Keach, Cathy Konrad
2006	The Last King of Scotland	Kevin Macdonald	Charles Steel, Lisa Bryer, Andrea Calderwood
2006	Aurora Borealis	James C.E. Burke	Scott Disharoon
2006	Flags of Our Fathers	Clint Eastwood	Clint Eastwood, Robert Lorenz, Steven Spielberg
2006	The Illusionist	Neil Burger	Brian Koppelman, David Levien, Michael London, Cathy Schulman, Bob Yari
2006	Letters from Iwo Jima	Clint Eastwood	Clint Eastwood, Robert Lorenz, Steven Spielberg
2006	Little Miss Sunshine	Jonathan Dayton, Valerie Faris	Marc Turtletaub, David T. Friendly, Peter Saraf, Albert Berger, Ron Yerxa
2006	The Queen	Stephen Frears	Andy Harries, Christine Langan, Tracey Seaward
2007	The Savages	Tamara Jenkins	Ted Hope, Anne Carey, Erica Westheimer
2007	Atonement	Joe Wright	Tim Bevan, Eric Fellner, Paul Webster
2007	The Bucket List	Rob Reiner	Craig Zadan, Neil Meron, Alan Greisman, Rob Reiner
2007	The Kite Runner	Marc Forster	William Horberg, Walter F. Parkes, Rebecca Yeldham, E. Bennett Walsh
2007	Michael Clayton	Tony Gilroy	Sydney Pollack, Steven Samuels, Jennifer Fox, Kerry Orent
2008	Frost/Nixon	Ron Howard	Brian Grazer, Ron Howard, Tim Bevan, Eric Fellner
2008	The Curious Case of Benjamin Button	David Fincher	Ceán Chaffin, Kathleen Kennedy, Frank Marshall
2008	Doubt	John Patrick Shanley	Scott Rudin
2008	Married Life	Ira Sachs	Ira Sachs, Steve Golin, Sidney Kimmel, Jawal Nga
2008	The Wrestler	Darren Aronofsky	Darren Aronofsky, Scott Franklin
2009	Invictus	Clint Eastwood	Clint Eastwood, Lori McCreary, Robert Lorenz, Mace Neufeld
2009	Crazy Heart	Scott Cooper	Robert Duvall, Robert Carliner, Judy Cairo, T Bone Burnett, Scott Cooper
2009	Julie & Julia	Nora Ephron	Nora Ephron, Laurence Mark, Eric Steel, Amy Robinson
2009	Up	Pete Docter	Jonas Rivera
2009	Up in the Air	Jason Reitman	Daniel Dubiecki, Jeffrey Clifford, Ivan Reitman, Jason Reitman

=== 2010s ===
Year	Film	Director	Producer/s
2010	The King's Speech	Tom Hooper	Iain Canning, Emile Sherman, Gareth Unwin
2010	Another Year	Mike Leigh	Georgina Lowe
2010	Casino Jack	George Hickenlooper	Gary Howsam, Bill Marks, George Zakk
2010	City Island	Raymond De Felitta	Raymond De Felitta, Andy Garcia, Lauren Versel, Zachary Matz
2010	The Company Men	John Wells	John Wells, Paula Weinstein, Claire Rudnick Polstein
2010	Get Low	Aaron Schneider	Dean Zanuck, David Gundlach
2010	The Kids Are All Right	Lisa Cholodenko	Gary Gilbert, Jeffrey Levy-Hinte, Celine Rattray, Jordan Horowitz, Daniela Taplin Lundberg, Philippe Hellman, Joel Newton
2010	Letters to Juliet	Gary Winick	Caroline Kaplan, Ellen Barkin, Mark Canton
2010	Red	Robert Schwentke	Lorenzo di Bonaventura, Mark Vahradian
2010	Secretariat	Randall Wallace	Mark Ciardi, Gordon Gray
2011	The Descendants	Alexander Payne	Jim Burke, Alexander Payne, Jim Taylor
2011	The Artist	Michel Hazanavicius	Thomas Langmann
2011	Extremely Loud and Incredibly Close	Stephen Daldry	Scott Rudin
2011	Midnight in Paris	Woody Allen	Letty Aronson, Stephen Tenenbaum, Jaume Roures
2011	War Horse	Steven Spielberg	Steven Spielberg, Kathleen Kennedy
2011	Win Win	Tom McCarthy	Mary Jane Skalski, Michael London, Lisa Marie Falcone, Tom McCarthy
2012	The Best Exotic Marigold Hotel	John Madden	Graham Broadbent, Peter Czernin
2012	Hitchcock	Sacha Gervasi	Ivan Reitman, Tom Pollock, Joe Medjuck, Tom Thayer, Alan Barnette
2012	Lincoln	Steven Spielberg	Steven Spielberg, Kathleen Kennedy
2012	Les Misérables	Tom Hooper	Tim Bevan, Eric Fellner, Debra Hayward, Cameron Mackintosh
2012	The Sessions	Ben Lewin	Judi Levine, Stephen Nemeth, Ben Lewin
2013	12 Years a Slave	Steve McQueen	Brad Pitt, Dede Gardner, Jeremy Kleiner, Bill Pohlad, Steve McQueen, Arnon Milchan, Anthony Katagas
2013	All Is Lost	J.C. Chandor	Justin Nappi, Teddy Schwarzman, Neal Dodson, Anna Gerb
2013	Captain Phillips	Paul Greengrass	Scott Rudin, Dana Brunetti, Michael De Luca
2013	Nebraska	Alexander Payne	Albert Berger, Ron Yerxa
2013	Philomena	Stephen Frears	Gabrielle Tana, Steve Coogan, Tracey Seaward
2013	Saving Mr. Banks	John Lee Hancock	Alison Owen, Ian Collie, Philip Steuer
2014	The Theory of Everything	James Marsh	Tim Bevan, Eric Fellner, Lisa Bruce, Anthony McCarten
2014	Birdman or (The Unexpected Virtue of Ignorance)	Alejandro González Iñárritu	Alejandro González Iñárritu, John Lesher, Arnon Milchan, James W. Skotchdopole
2014	Boyhood	Richard Linklater	Richard Linklater, Cathleen Sutherland, Jonathan Sehring, John Sloss
2014	The Imitation Game	Morten Tyldum	Nora Grossman, Ido Ostrowsky, Teddy Schwarzman
2014	Love Is Strange	Ira Sachs	Lucas Joaquin, Lars Knudsen, Ira Sachs, Jayne Baron Sherman, Jay Van Hoy
2015	Spotlight	Tom McCarthy	Blye Pagon Faust, Steve Golin, Nicole Rocklin, Michael Sugar
2015	Brooklyn	John Crowley	Amanda Posey, Finola Dwyer
2015	Joy	David O. Russell	John Davis, Megan Ellison, Jonathan Gordon
2015	Love & Mercy	Bill Pohlad	Bill Pohlad, Claire Rudnick Polstein, John Wells
2015	The Martian	Ridley Scott	Simon Kinberg, Ridley Scott, Michael Schaefer, Mark Huffam
2016	Loving	Jeff Nichols	Ged Doherty, Colin Firth, Nancy Buirski, Sarah Green (film producer), Marc Turtletaub, Peter Saraf
2016	La La Land	Damien Chazelle	Fred Berger, Jordan Horowitz, Gary Gilbert, Marc Platt
2016	Lion	Garth Davis	Emile Sherman, Iain Canning, Angie Fielder
2016	Manchester by the Sea	Kenneth Lonergan	Matt Damon, Kimberly Steward, Chris Moore, Lauren Beck, Kevin J. Walsh
2016	Silence	Martin Scorsese	Barbara De Fina, Randall Emmett, Vittorio Cecchi Gori, Emma Tillinger Koskoff, Gastón Pavlovich, Martin Scorsese, Irwin Winkler
2016	Sully	Clint Eastwood	Clint Eastwood, Frank Marshall, Tim Moore, Allyn Stewart
2017	Star Wars: The Last Jedi	Rian Johnson	Kathleen Kennedy, Ram Bergman
2017	Get Out	Jordan Peele	Sean McKittrick, Jason Blum, Edward H. Hamm Jr., Jordan Peele
2017	Lady Bird	Greta Gerwig	Scott Rudin, Eli Bush, Evelyn O'Neill
2017	The Shape of Water	Guillermo del Toro	Guillermo del Toro, J. Miles Dale
2017	Three Billboards outside Ebbing, Missouri	Martin McDonagh	Graham Broadbent, Peter Czernin, Martin McDonagh
2018	Green Book	Peter Farrelly	Jim Burke, Brian Hayes Curie, Peter Farrelly, Nick Vallelonga, Charles B. Wessler
2018	BlacKkKlansman	Spike Lee	Jason Blum, Spike Lee, Raymond Mansfield, Sean McKittrick, Jordan Peele, Shaun Redick
2018	Can You Ever Forgive Me?	Marielle Heller	Anne Carey, Amy Nauiokas, David Yarnell
2018	Roma	Alfonso Cuaron	Gabriela Rodríguez, Alfonso Cuaron, Nicolás Celis
2018	A Star Is Born	Bradley Cooper	Bill Gerber, Jon Peters, Bradley Cooper, Todd Phillips, Lynette Howell Taylor
2019	The Irishman	Martin Scorsese	Martin Scorsese, Robert De Niro, Jane Rosenthal, Emma Tillinger Koskoff, Irwin Winkler, Gerard Chamales, Gastón Pavlovich, Randall Emmett, Gabriele Israilovici
2019	A Beautiful Day in the Neighborhood	Marielle Heller	Youree Henley, Peter Saraf, Marc Turtletaub, Leah Holzer
2019	Bombshell	Jay Roach	Aaron L. Gilbert, Jay Roach, Robert Graf, Michelle Graham, Charles Randolph, Margaret Riley, Charlize Theron, A.J. Dix, Beth Kono
2019	The Farewell	Lulu Wang	Daniele Melia, Marc Turtletaub, Peter Saraf, Andrew Miano, Chris Weitz, Jane Zheng, Lulu Wang, Anita Gou
2019	Little Women	Greta Gerwig	Amy Pascal, Denise Di Novi, Robin Swicord
2019	Marriage Story	Noah Baumbach	David Heyman, Noah Baumbach
2019	Once Upon a Time in Hollywood	Quentin Tarantino	David Heyman, Shannon McIntosh, Quentin Tarantino
2019	The Two Popes	Fernando Meirelles	Dan Lin, Jonathan Eirich, Tracey Seaward

=== 2020s ===
Year	Film	Director	Producer/s
2020	The United States vs. Billie Holiday	Lee Daniels	Lee Daniels, Jordan Fudge, Tucker Tooley, Joe Roth, Jeff Kirschenbaum, Pamela Oas Williams
2020	Minari	Lee Isaac Chung	Dede Gardner, Jeremy Kleiner, Christina Oh
2020	Nomadland	Chloé Zhao	Frances McDormand, Peter Spears, Mollye Asher, Dan Janvey, Chloé Zhao
2020	One Night in Miami...	Regina King	Jess Wu Calder, Keith Calder, Jody Klein
2020	The Trial of the Chicago 7	Aaron Sorkin	Stuart M. Besser, Matt Jackson, Marc Platt, Tyler Thompson
2021	Belfast	Kenneth Branagh	Laura Berwick, Kenneth Branagh, Becca Kovacik, Tamar Thomas
2021	Being the Ricardos	Aaron Sorkin	Todd Black, Jason Blumenthal, Steve Tisch
2021	King Richard	Reinaldo Marcus Green	Tim White, Trevor White, Will Smith
2021	The Power of the Dog	Jane Campion	Emile Sherman, Iain Canning, Roger Frappier, Jane Campion, Tanya Seghatchian
2021	West Side Story	Steven Spielberg	Steven Spielberg, Kristie Macosko Krieger, Kevin McCollum
2022	Top Gun: Maverick	Joseph Kosinski	Jerry Bruckheimer, Tom Cruise, Christopher McQuarrie, David Ellison
2022	Elvis	Baz Luhrmann	Baz Luhrmann, Catherine Martin, Gail Berman, Patrick McCormack, Schuyler Weiss
2022	Everything Everywhere All at Once	Daniel Kwan & Daniel Scheinart	Anthony Russo, Joe Russo, Mike Larocca, Daniel Kwan, Daniel Scheinart, Jonathan Wang
2022	The Fabelmans	Steven Spielberg	Kristie Macosko Krieger, Tony Kushner, Steven Spielberg
2022	TÁR	Todd Field	Todd Field, Alexandra Milchan, Scott Lambert
2022	The Woman King	Gina Prince-Bythewood	Cathy Schulman, Viola Davis, Julius Tennon, Maria Bello
2022	Women Talking	Sarah Polley	Dede Gardner, Jeremy Kleiner, Frances McDormand
2023	Killers of the Flower Moon	Martin Scorsese	Dan Friedkin, Bradley Thomas, Martin Scorsese, Daniel Lupi
2023	Barbie	Greta Gerwig	David Heyman, Margot Robbie, Tom Ackerley, Robbie Brenner
2023	The Color Purple	Blitz Bazawule	Oprah Winfrey, Steven Spielberg, Scott Sanders, Quincy Jones
2023	Maestro	Bradley Cooper	Bradley Cooper, Steven Spielberg, Fred Berner, Amy Durning, Kristie Macosko Krieger
2023	Oppenheimer	Christopher Nolan	Emma Thomas, Charles Roven, Christopher Nolan
2024	A Complete Unknown	James Mangold	Fred Berger, James Mangold, Alex Heineman
2024	Conclave	Edward Berger	Tessa Ross, Juliette Howell, Michael A. Jackman
2024	Emilia Pérez	Jacques Audiard	Pascal Caucheteux, Jacques Audiard
2024	Gladiator II	Ridley Scott	Ridley Scott, Michael Pruss, Douglas Wick, Lucy Fisher, David Franzoni
2024	September 5	Tim Fehlbaum	Philipp Trauer, Thomas Wöbke, Tim Fehlbaum, Sean Penn, John Ira Palmer, John Wildermuth
2025	Hamnet	Chloé Zhao	Liza Marshall, Pippa Harris, Nicolas Gonda, Steven Spielberg, Sam Mendes
2025	A House of Dynamite	Kathryn Bigelow	Greg Shapiro, Kathryn Bigelow, Noah Oppenheim
2025	One Battle After Another	Paul Thomas Anderson	Adam Somner, Sara Murphy, Paul Thomas Anderson
2025	Sinners	Ryan Coogler	Zinzi Coogler, Sev Ohanian, Ryan Coogler
2025	Train Dreams	Clint Bentley	Marissa McMahon, Teddy Schwarzman, Will Janowitz, Ashley Schlaifer, Michael Heimler

== See also ==
- Academy Award for Best Picture
- Golden Globe Award for Best Motion Picture – Drama
- Golden Globe Award for Best Motion Picture – Musical or Comedy
- BAFTA Award for Best Film
- Critics' Choice Movie Award for Best Acting Ensemble
- Critics' Choice Movie Award for Best Picture
- Independent Spirit Award for Best Film
