= 17th AARP Movies for Grownups Awards =

Film award ceremony

- Announced on: January 17, 2018
- Presented on: February 5, 2018
- Hosted by: Alan Cumming

Highlights
- Most awards: The Shape of Water (2)
- Most nominations: The Post (5)

Television coverage
- Network: PBS

The 17th AARP Movies for Grownups Awards, presented by AARP the Magazine, honored films released in 2017 and were announced on January 17, 2018. The awards recognized films created by and about people over the age of 50. The awards ceremony on February 5, 2018 was hosted by actor Alan Cumming at the Beverly Wilshire Hotel. This was the first year since 2015 that the ceremony was broadcast on television, airing on PBS as part of its Great Performances series on February 23, 2018.

This year marked the debut of the Best Ensemble award.

== Awards ==
=== Winners and Nominees ===
Winners are listed first, highlighted in boldface, and indicated with a double dagger (‡).

**Best Movie for Grownups**: **Star Wars: The Last Jedi**‡; Get Out; Lady Bird; The Shape of Water; Three Billboards Outside Ebbing, Missouri	**Best Director**: **Guillermo del Toro – The Shape of Water**‡; Kenneth Branagh - Murder on the Orient Express; Reginald Hudlin - Marshall; Ridley Scott - All the Money in the World; Steven Spielberg - The Post
**Best Actor**: **Gary Oldman - Darkest Hour**‡; Steve Carell - Battle of the Sexes; Daniel Day-Lewis - Phantom Thread; Tom Hanks - The Post; Denzel Washington - Roman J. Israel, Esq.	**Best Actress**: **Annette Bening - Film Stars Don't Die in Liverpool**‡; Judi Dench - Victoria & Abdul; Salma Hayek - Beatriz at Dinner; Frances McDormand - Three Billboards Outside Ebbing, Missouri; Meryl Streep - The Post
**Best Supporting Actor**: **Richard Jenkins - The Shape of Water**‡; Willem Dafoe - The Florida Project; Laurence Fishburne - Last Flag Flying; Woody Harrelson - Three Billboards Outside Ebbing, Missouri; Christopher Plummer - All the Money in the World	**Best Supporting Actress**: **Laurie Metcalf - Lady Bird**‡; Holly Hunter - The Big Sick; Allison Janney - I, Tonya; Melissa Leo - Novitiate; Lesley Manville - Phantom Thread
**Best Ensemble**: **Get Out**‡; Girls Trip; Last Flag Flying; Mudbound; Murder on the Orient Express	**Best Screenwriter**: **Aaron Sorkin - Molly's Game**‡; Guillermo del Toro - The Shape of Water; James Ivory - Call Me By Your Name; Anthony McCarten - Darkest Hour; Steven Rogers - I, Tonya
**Best Time Capsule**: **Dunkirk**‡; Battle of the Sexes; Darkest Hour; I, Tonya; The Post	**Best Intergenerational Film**: **The Florida Project**‡; The Big Sick; Lady Bird; Marjorie Prime; Wonder
**Best Grownup Love Story**: **The Greatest Showman**‡; Breathe; Film Stars Don't Die in Liverpool; The Leisure Seeker; Our Souls at Night	**Best Documentary**: **I Am Not Your Negro**‡; Dolores; Harold and Lillian: A Hollywood Love Story; Joan Didion: The Center Will Not Hold; Mission Control: The Unsung Heroes of Apollo
**Best Foreign Film**: **A Taxi Driver - South Korea**‡; Chavela - Mexico; The Insult - Lebanon; Like Crazy - Italy; The Women's Balcony - Israel	**Readers' Choice Poll** **Wonder Woman**‡: Beauty and the Beast; Dunkirk; Get Out; Girls Trip; Last Flag Flying; Murder on the Orient Express; The Post; Star Wars: The Last Jedi; Wonder

=== Career Achievement Award ===
- Helen Mirren: "Clearly the prime suspect for an award honoring an actress whose success grows with age: Ninety-three percent of her movies' $1.5 billion total earnings arrived after she turned 50, along with most of her top acting honors, including an Oscar for The Queen."

=== Films with multiple nominations and awards ===
Films that received multiple nominations
Nominations	Film
5	The Post
4	The Shape of Water
3	Darkest Hour
3	Get Out
3	I, Tonya
3	Lady Bird
3	Last Flag Flying
3	Murder on the Orient Express
3	Three Billboards Outside Ebbing, Missouri
2	All the Money in the World
2	Battle of the Sexes
2	The Big Sick
2	Film Stars Don't Die in Liverpool
2	The Florida Project
2	Phantom Thread
2	Star Wars: The Last Jedi
2	Wonder

Films that received multiple awards
Wins	Film
2	The Shape of Water
