= AARP Movies for Grownups Award for Best Director =

Annual US film award

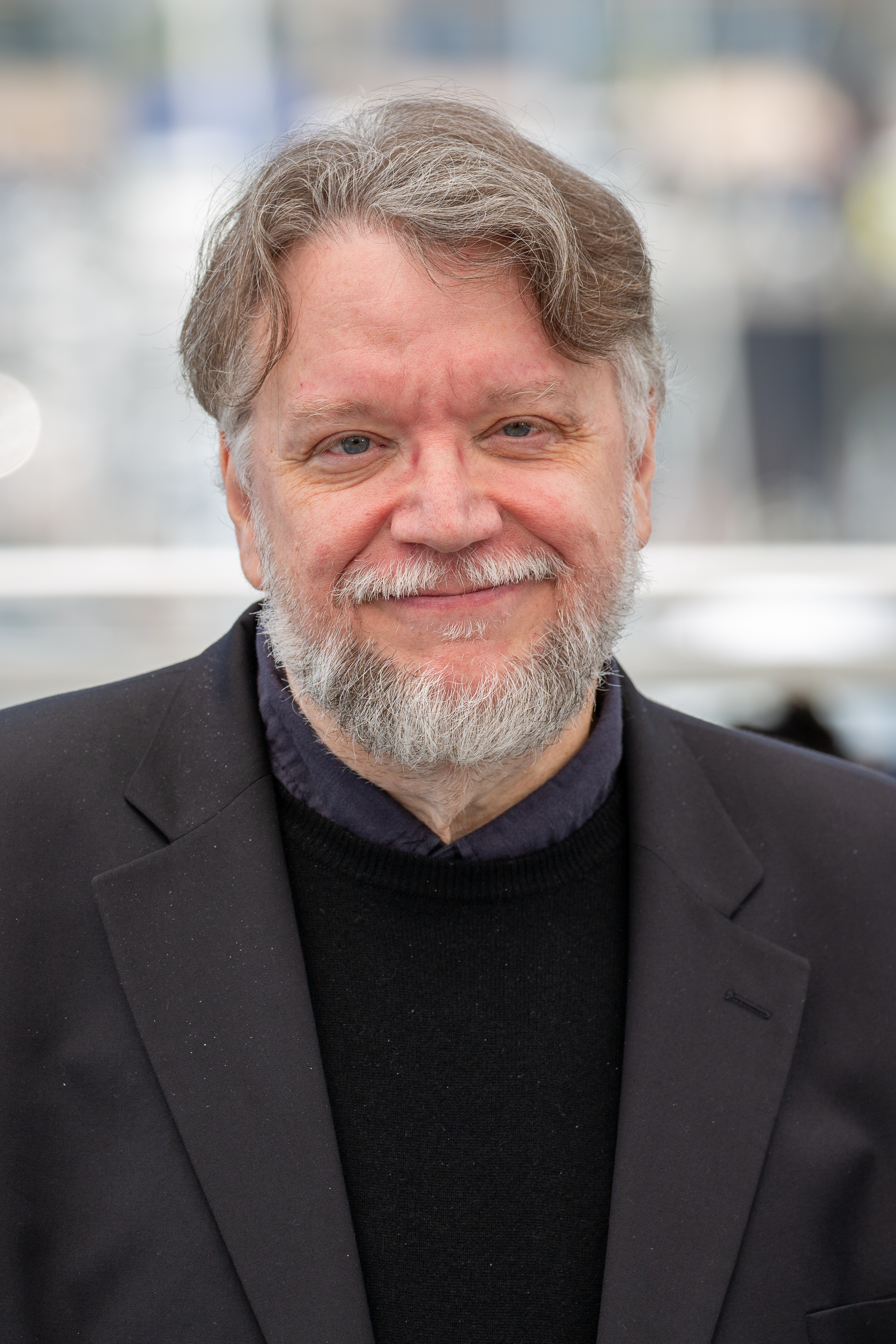
- The 2025 recipient: Guillermo del Toro
- Awarded for: Best Director over 50
- Country: United States
- Presented by: AARP
- First award: Robert Altman for Gosford Park (2001)
- Currently held by: Guillermo del Toro for Frankenstein (2025)
- Website: https://www.aarp.org/entertainment/movies-for-grownups/

The AARP Movies for Grownups Award for Best Director is one of the AARP Movies for Grownups Awards presented annually by the AARP since the awards' inception in 2002. The award honors the best director over the age of fifty. The Best Director Award is one of the seven original trophies issued by AARP the Magazine, along with awards for Best Movie for Grownups, Best Actor, Best Actress, Best Foreign Film, Best Documentary, and Best Movie for Grownups Who Refuse to Grow Up.

== Winners and Nominees ==
indicates the winners.

=== 2000s ===
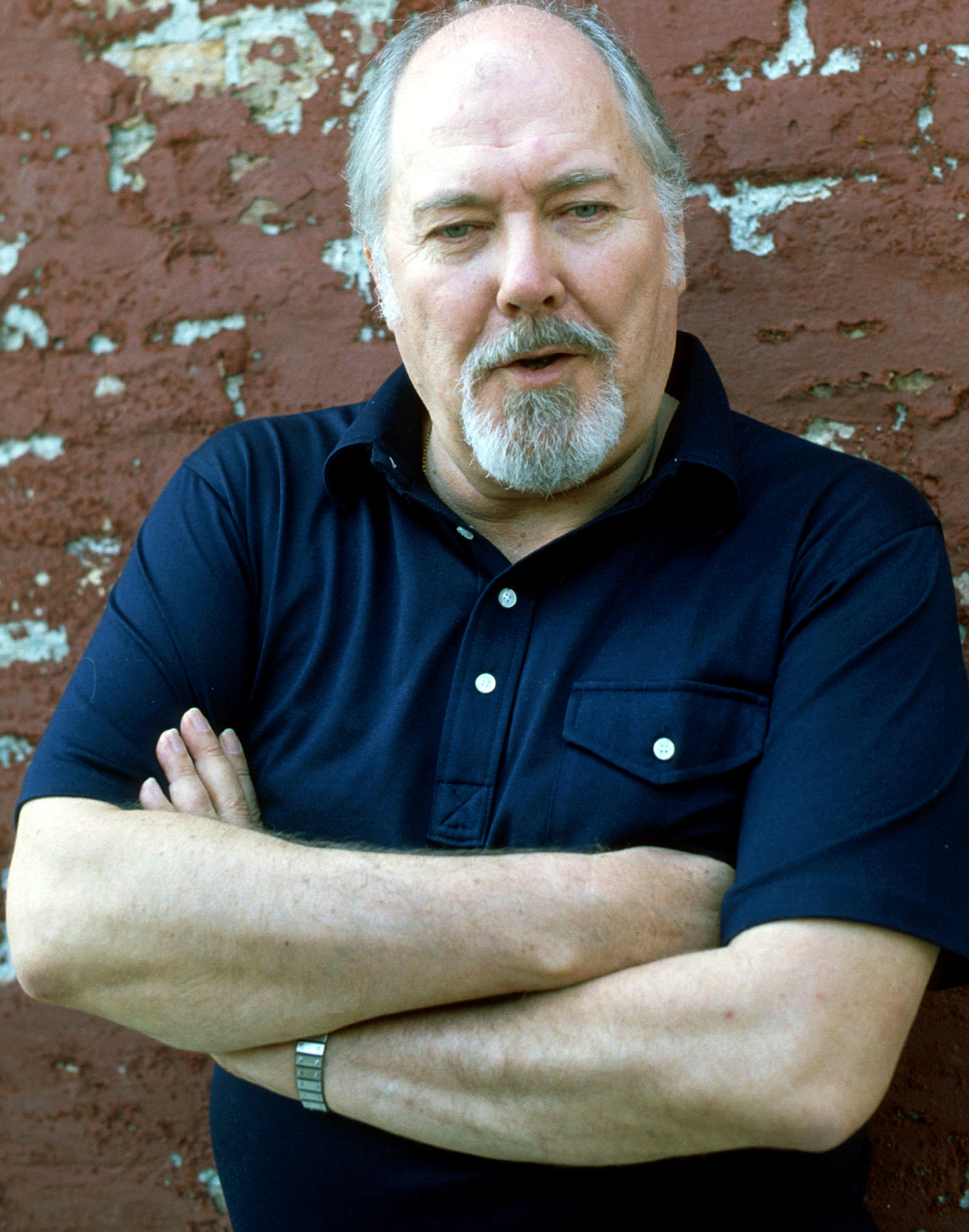
Robert Altman won Best Director at the 1st AARP Movies for Grownups Awards.

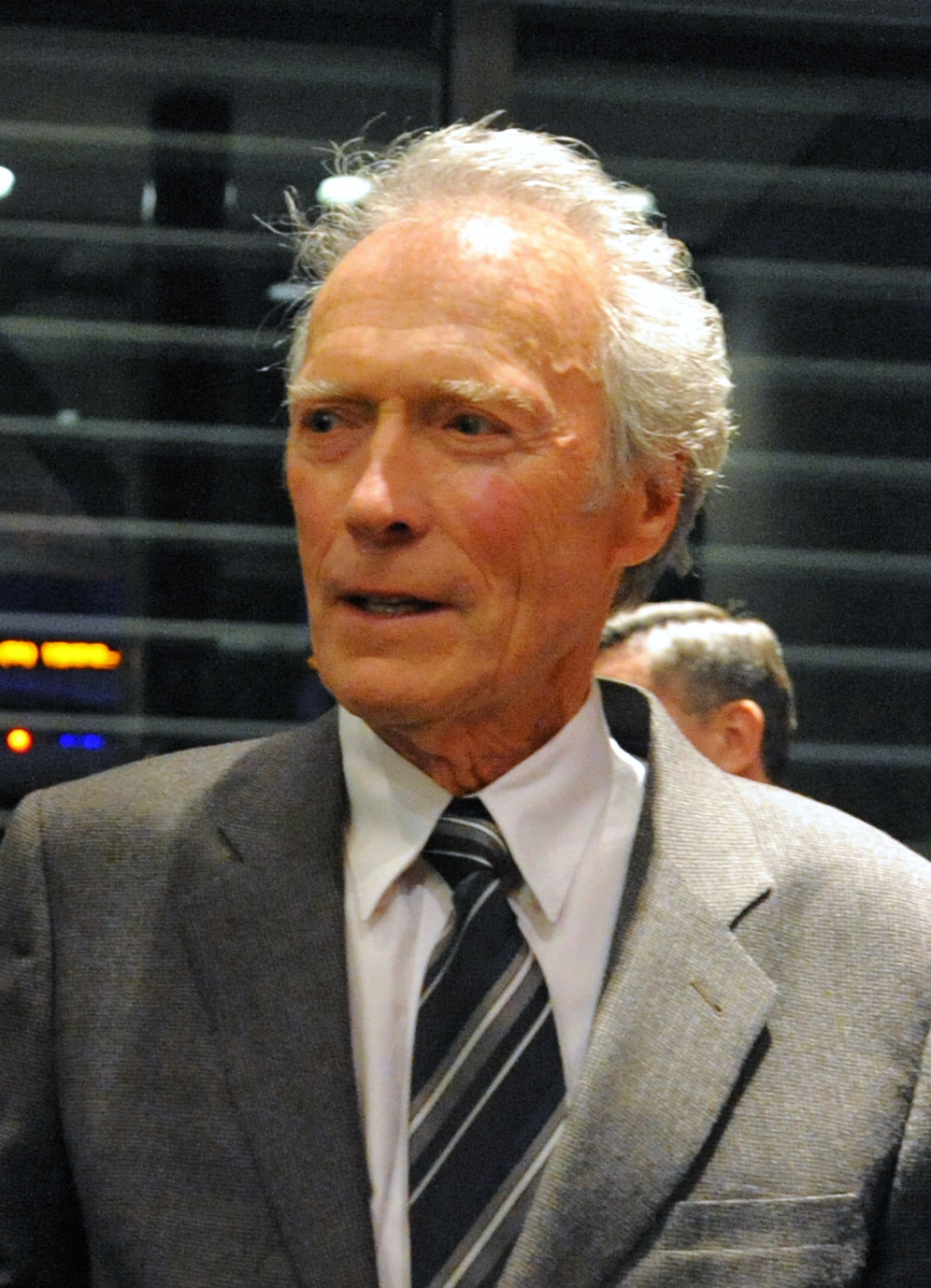
Clint Eastwood was the first winner and last nominee to be recognized for multiple films in one year.

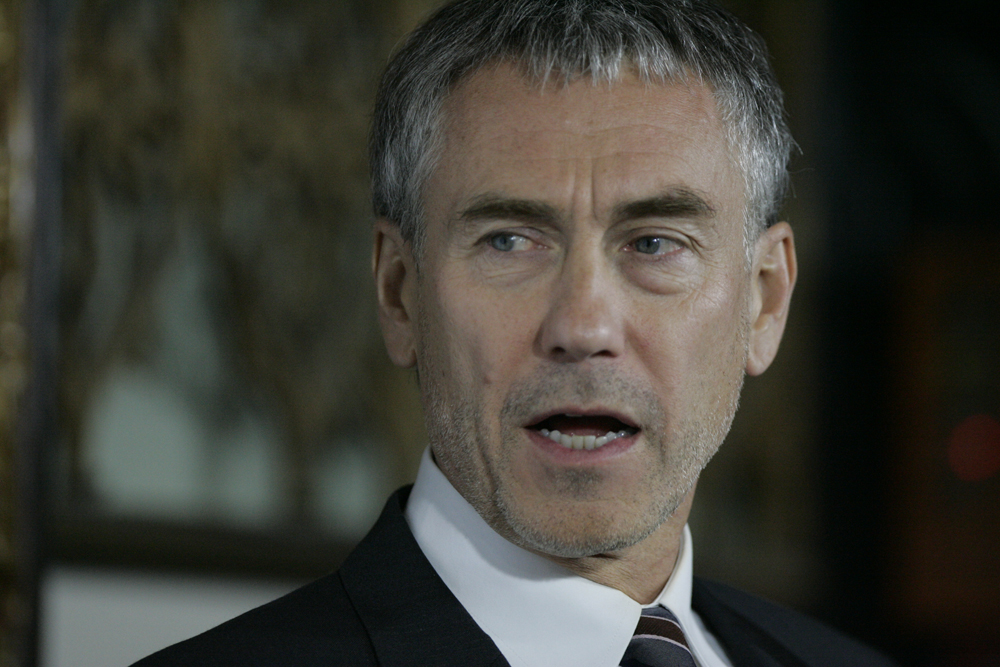
Tony Gilroy won for his directorial debut, Michael Clayton.

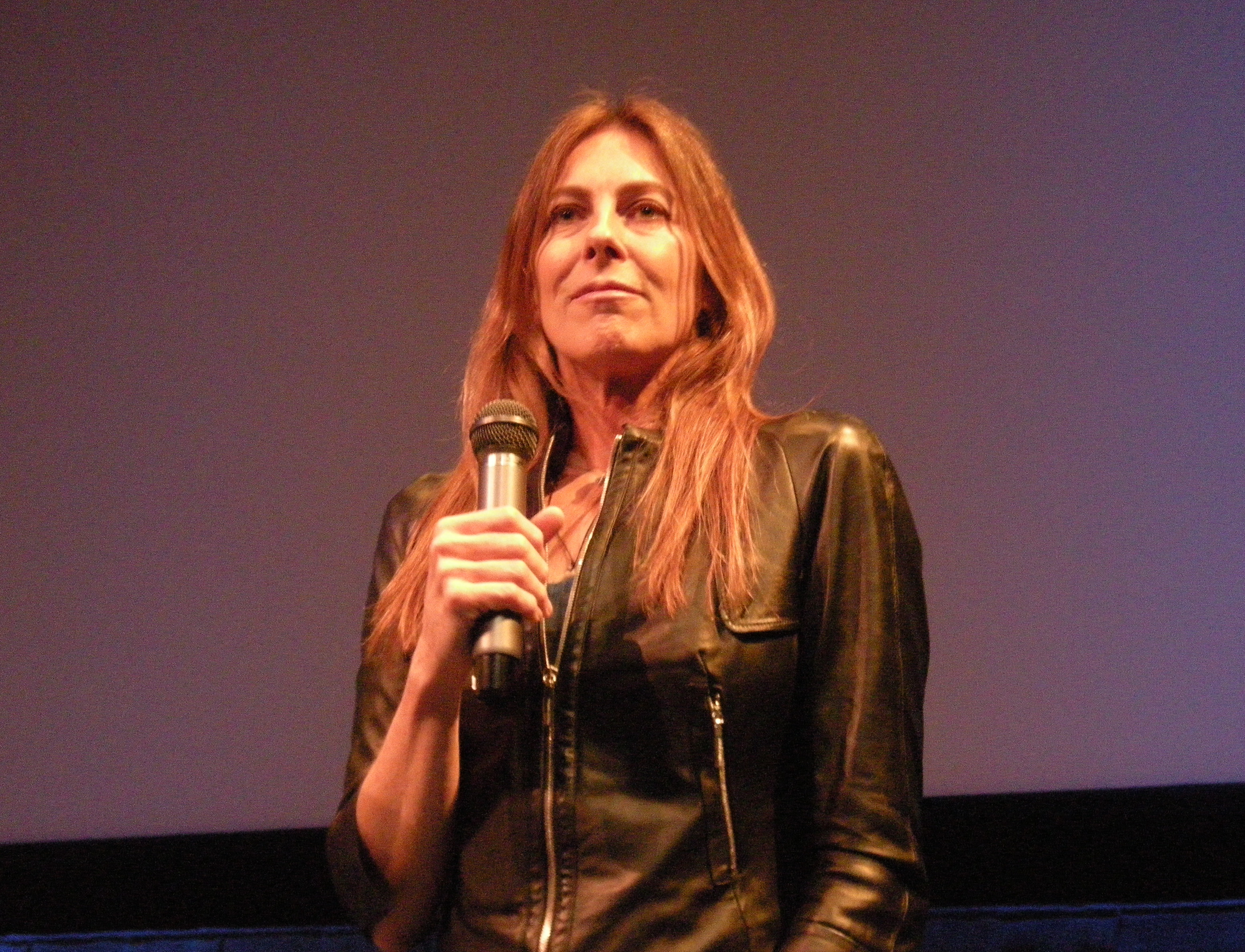
Kathryn Bigelow is the only woman to have won Best Director from the AARP, for 2009's The Hurt Locker.

Year	Director(s)	Film	Ref.
2001 (1st)	Robert Altman	Gosford Park	
2001 (1st)	Michael Mann	Ali	
2001 (1st)	Ridley Scott	Black Hawk Down	
2001 (1st)	Tony Scott	Spy Game	
2002 (2nd)	Roman Polanski	The Pianist	
2002 (2nd)	Phillip Noyce	Rabbit-Proof Fence and The Quiet American	
2002 (2nd)	Manoel de Oliveira	I'm Going Home	
2002 (2nd)	Martin Scorsese	Gangs of New York	
2002 (2nd)	Steven Spielberg	Minority Report and Catch Me If You Can	
2003 (3rd)	Joel Schumacher	Phone Booth	
2003 (3rd)	Clint Eastwood	Mystic River	
2003 (3rd)	Alan Rudolph	The Secret Lives of Dentists	
2003 (3rd)	Ridley Scott	Matchstick Men	
2003 (3rd)	Jim Sheridan	In America	
2004 (4th)	Mike Nichols	Closer	
2004 (4th)	Clint Eastwood	Million Dollar Baby	
2004 (4th)	Taylor Hackford	Ray	
2004 (4th)	Michael Mann	Collateral	
2004 (4th)	Martin Scorsese	The Aviator	
2004 (4th)	Ousmane Sembène	Moolaadé	
2005 (5th)	Steven Spielberg	Munich	
2005 (5th)	Woody Allen	Match Point	
2005 (5th)	Ron Howard	Cinderella Man	
2005 (5th)	Ang Lee	Brokeback Mountain	
2005 (5th)	Fernando Meirelles	The Constant Gardener	
2006 (6th)	Clint Eastwood	Flags of Our Fathers and Letters from Iwo Jima	
2006 (6th)	Bill Condon	Dreamgirls	
2006 (6th)	Stephen Frears	The Queen	
2006 (6th)	Paul Greengrass	United 93	
2006 (6th)	Martin Scorsese	The Departed	
2007 (7th)	Tony Gilroy	Michael Clayton	
2007 (7th)	Joel and Ethan Coen	No Country for Old Men	
2007 (7th)	Paul Haggis	In the Valley of Elah	
2007 (7th)	Mike Nichols	Charlie Wilson's War	
2007 (7th)	Julian Schnabel	The Diving Bell and the Butterfly	
2008 (8th)	Gus Van Sant	Milk	
2008 (8th)	Danny Boyle	Slumdog Millionaire	
2008 (8th)	Jonathan Demme	Rachel Getting Married	
2008 (8th)	Ron Howard	Frost/Nixon	
2008 (8th)	John Patrick Shanley	Doubt	
2009 (9th)	Kathryn Bigelow	The Hurt Locker	
2009 (9th)	Lee Daniels	Precious: Based on the Novel 'Push' by Sapphire	
2009 (9th)	Clint Eastwood	Invictus	
2009 (9th)	Nora Ephron	Julie & Julia	
2009 (9th)	Rob Marshall	Nine	
2009 (9th)	Nancy Meyers	It's Complicated	

=== 2010s ===
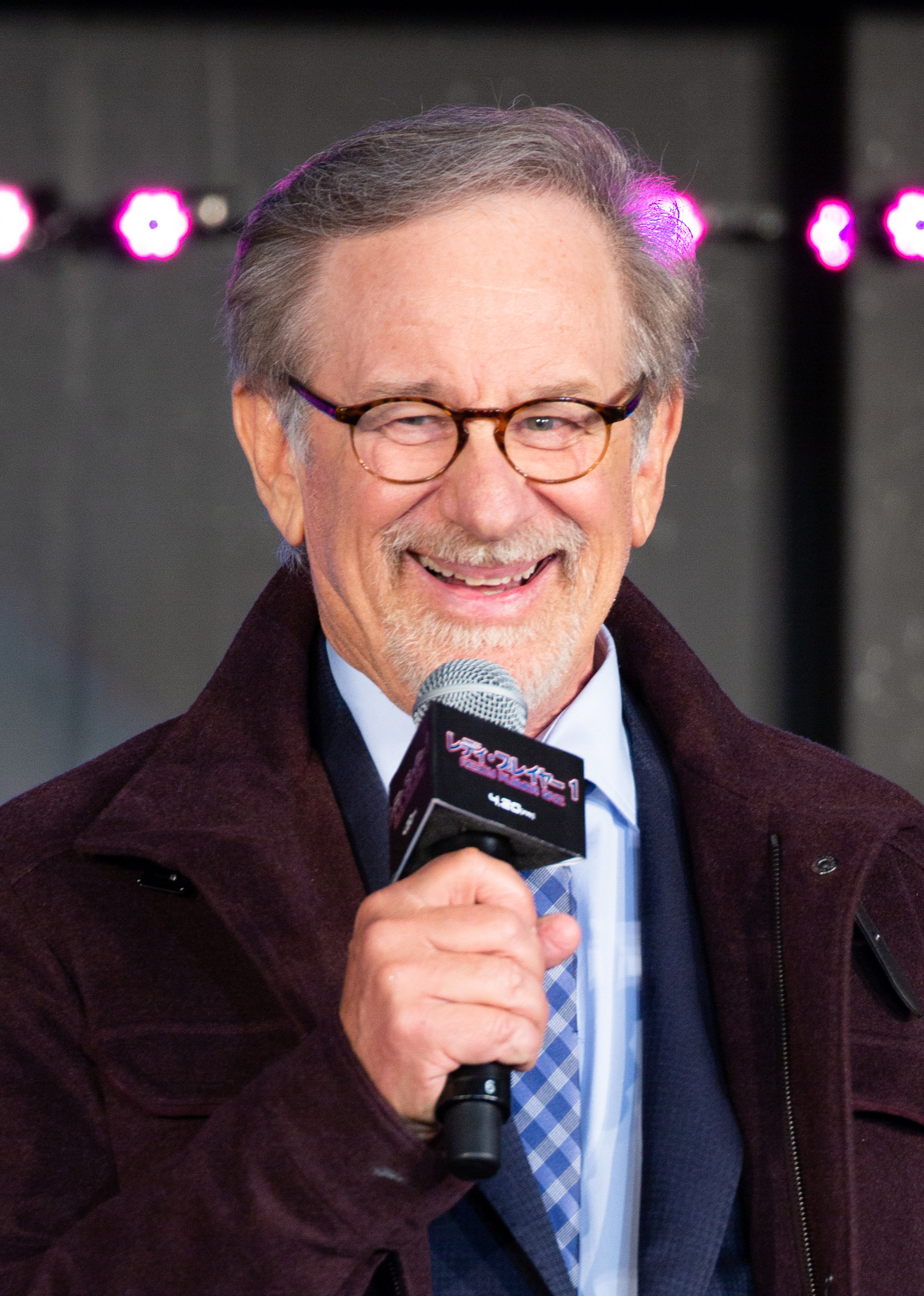
Steven Spielberg was the first repeat winner of the Best Director award.

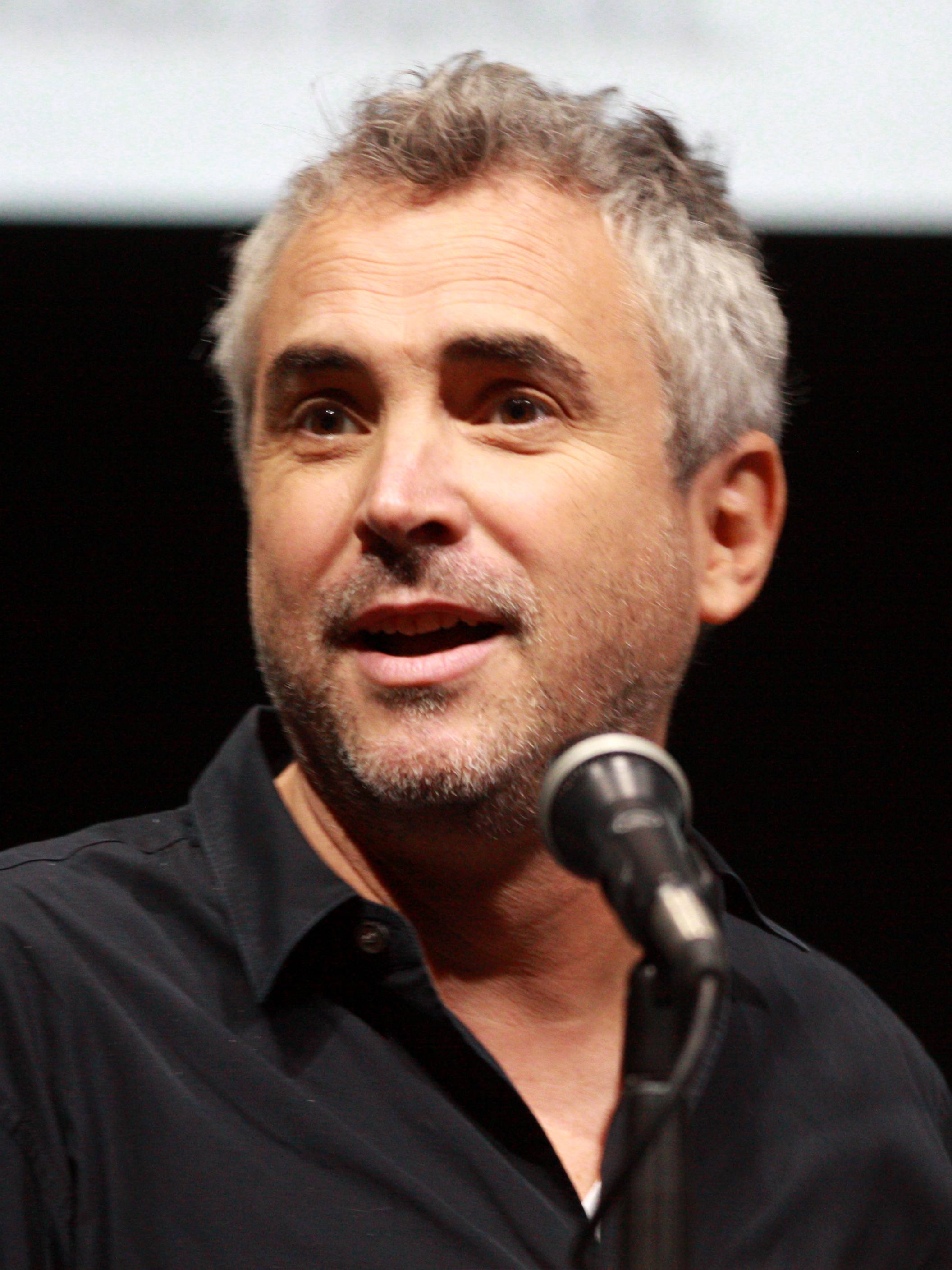
Alfonso Cuarón was the first winner born outside Europe or the United States.

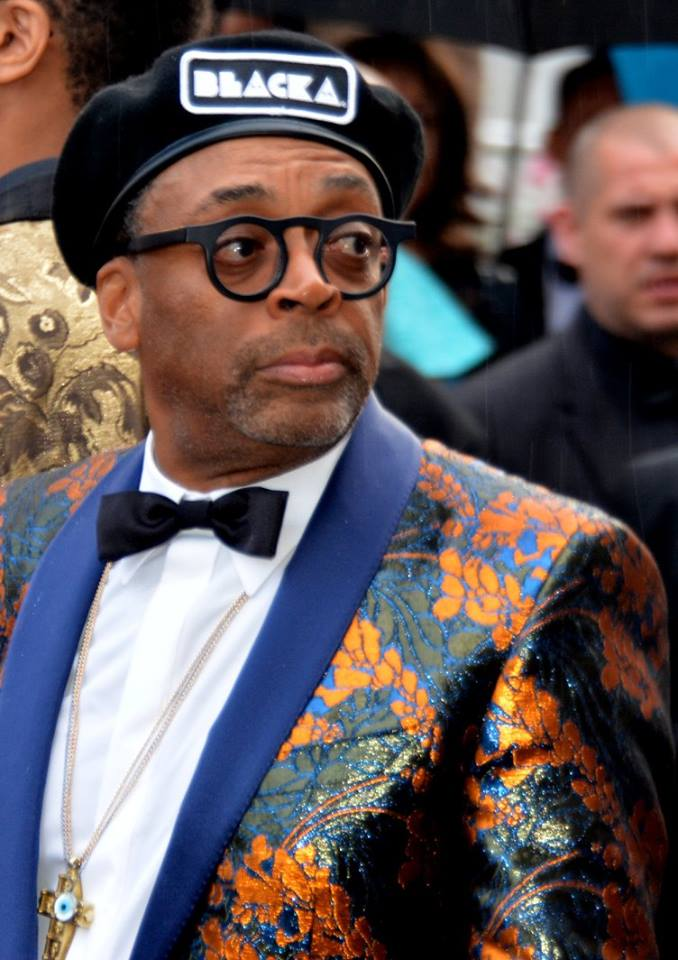
Spike Lee was the first Black winner, for 2018's BlacKkKlansman.

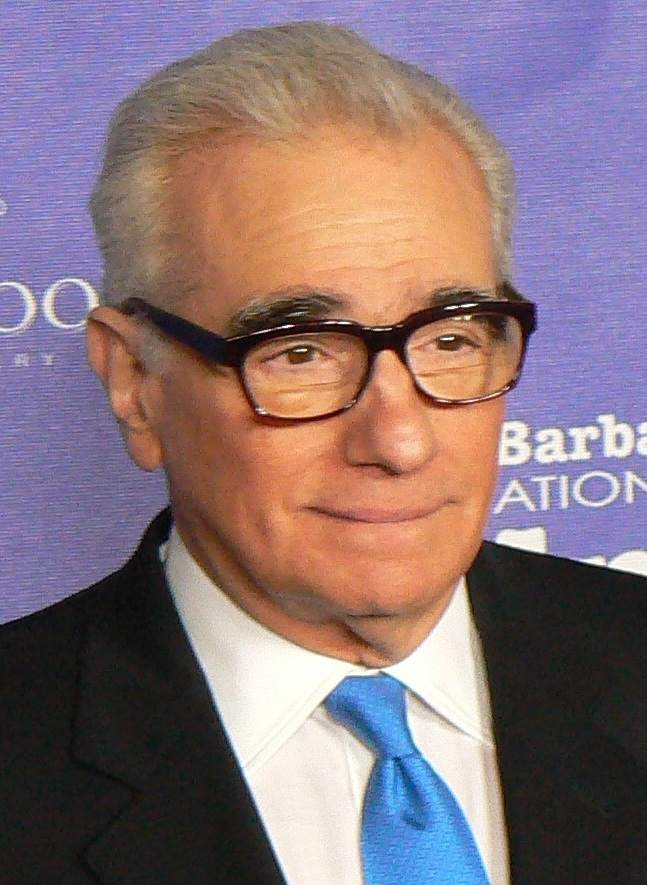
Martin Scorsese won in 2019 for The Irishman, his sixth nomination.

Year	Director(s)	Film	Ref.
2010 (10th)	Danny Boyle	127 Hours	
2010 (10th)	Paul Greengrass	Green Zone	
2010 (10th)	Paul Haggis	The Next Three Days	
2010 (10th)	Tony Scott	Unstoppable	
2010 (10th)	John Wells	The Company Men	
2011 (11th)	Stephen Daldry	Extremely Loud and Incredibly Close	
2011 (11th)	Woody Allen	Midnight in Paris	
2011 (11th)	George Clooney	The Ides of March	
2011 (11th)	Cameron Crowe	We Bought a Zoo	
2011 (11th)	Terrence Malick	The Tree of Life	
2011 (11th)	Martin Scorsese	Hugo	
2012 (12th)	Steven Spielberg	Lincoln	
2012 (12th)	Kathryn Bigelow	Zero Dark Thirty	
2012 (12th)	Ang Lee	Life of Pi	
2012 (12th)	David O. Russell	Silver Linings Playbook	
2012 (12th)	Gus Van Sant	Promised Land	
2013 (13th)	Alfonso Cuarón	Gravity	
2013 (13th)	J.C. Chandor	All Is Lost	
2013 (13th)	Stephen Frears	Philomena	
2013 (13th)	Paul Greengrass	Captain Phillips	
2013 (13th)	Nicole Holofcener	Enough Said	
2014 (14th)	Richard Linklater	Boyhood	
2014 (14th)	Clint Eastwood	American Sniper	
2014 (14th)	Alejandro González Iñárritu	Birdman or (The Unexpected Virtue of Ignorance)	
2014 (14th)	James Marsh	The Theory of Everything	
2014 (14th)	Ira Sachs	Love is Strange	
2015 (15th)	Ridley Scott	The Martian	
2015 (15th)	Todd Haynes	Carol	
2015 (15th)	Alejandro González Iñárritu	The Revenant	
2015 (15th)	David O. Russell	Joy	
2015 (15th)	Steven Spielberg	Bridge of Spies	
2016 (16th)	Kenneth Lonergan	Manchester by the Sea	
2016 (16th)	Clint Eastwood	Sully	
2016 (16th)	David Mackenzie	Hell or High Water	
2016 (16th)	Martin Scorsese	Silence	
2016 (16th)	Denzel Washington	Fences	
2017 (17th)	Guillermo del Toro	The Shape of Water	
2017 (17th)	Kenneth Branagh	Murder on the Orient Express	
2017 (17th)	Reginald Hudlin	Marshall	
2017 (17th)	Ridley Scott	All the Money in the World	
2017 (17th)	Steven Spielberg	The Post	
2018 (18th)	Spike Lee	BlacKkKlansman	
2018 (18th)	Kenneth Branagh	All is True	
2018 (18th)	Alfonso Cuaron	Roma	
2018 (18th)	Peter Farrelly	Green Book	
2018 (18th)	Mimi Leder	On the Basis of Sex	
2019 (19th)	Martin Scorsese	The Irishman	
2019 (19th)	Noah Baumbach	Marriage Story	
2019 (19th)	Fernando Meirelles	The Two Popes	
2019 (19th)	Sam Mendes	1917	
2019 (19th)	Quentin Tarantino	Once Upon a Time in Hollywood	

=== 2020s ===
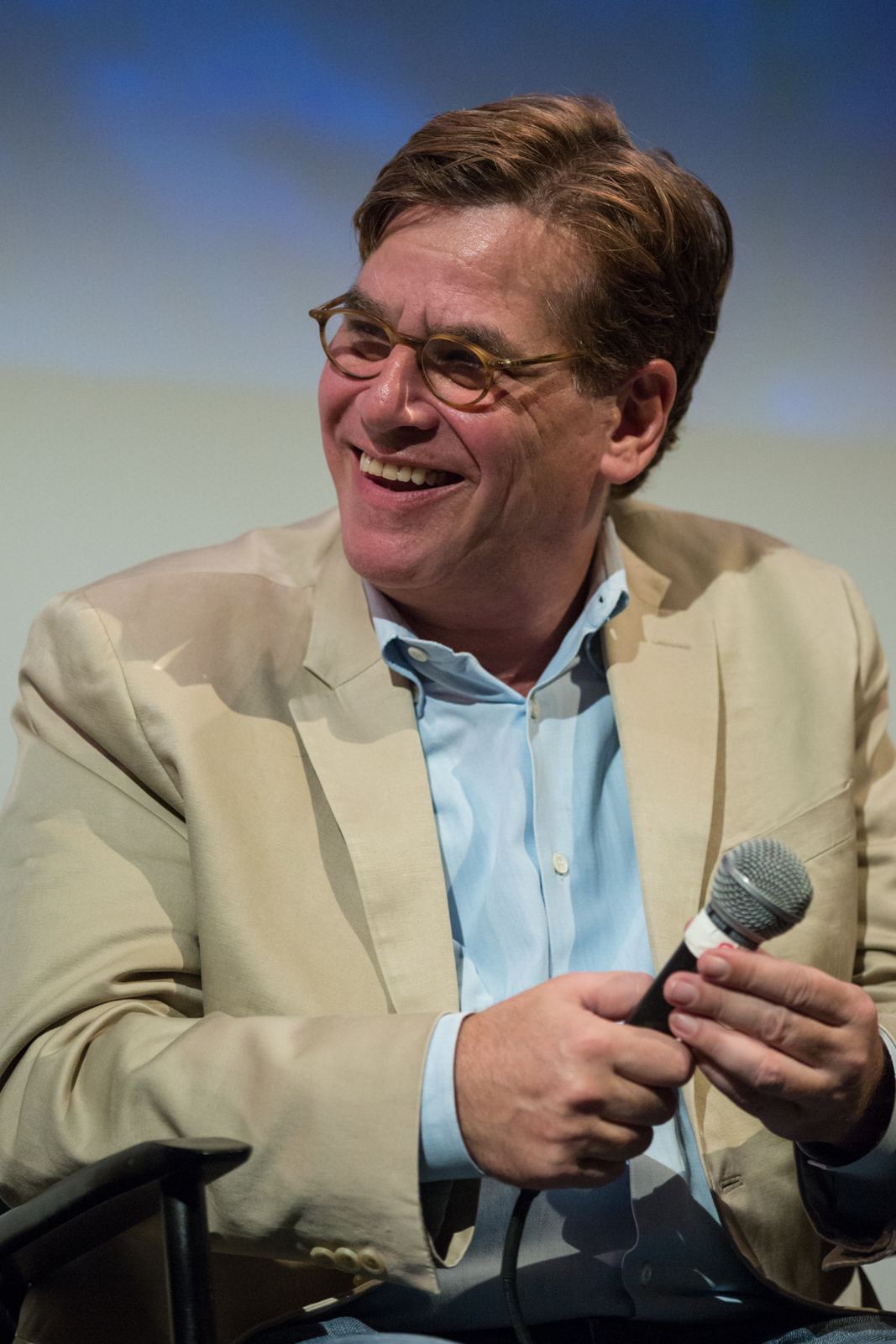
Aaron Sorkin won the awards for Director and Screenwriter for The Trial of the Chicago 7.

Year	Director(s)	Film	Ref.
2020/21 (20th)	Aaron Sorkin	The Trial of the Chicago 7	
2020/21 (20th)	Lee Daniels	The United States vs. Billie Holiday	
2020/21 (20th)	Regina King	One Night in Miami...	
2020/21 (20th)	Spike Lee	Da 5 Bloods	
2020/21 (20th)	George C. Wolfe	Ma Rainey's Black Bottom	
2021 (21st)	Jane Campion	The Power of the Dog	
2021 (21st)	Kenneth Branagh	Belfast	
2021 (21st)	Guillermo del Toro	Nightmare Alley	
2021 (21st)	Steven Spielberg	West Side Story	
2021 (21st)	Denis Villeneuve	Dune	
2022 (22nd)	Baz Luhrmann	Elvis	
2022 (22nd)	James Cameron	Avatar: The Way of Water	
2022 (22nd)	Todd Field	TÁR	
2022 (22nd)	Gina Prince-Bythewood	The Woman King	
2022 (22nd)	Steven Spielberg	The Fabelmans	
2023 (23rd)	Christopher Nolan	Oppenheimer	
2023 (23rd)	Ben Affleck	Air	
2023 (23rd)	Michael Mann	Ferrari	
2023 (23rd)	Alexander Payne	The Holdovers	
2023 (23rd)	Martin Scorsese	Killers of the Flower Moon	
2024 (24th)	Jacques Audiard	Emilia Pérez	
2024 (24th)	Pedro Almodóvar	The Room Next Door	
2024 (24th)	Edward Berger	Conclave	
2024 (24th)	James Mangold	A Complete Unknown	
2024 (24th)	Ridley Scott	Gladiator II	
2025 (25th)	Guillermo del Toro	Frankenstein	
2025 (25th)	Paul Thomas Anderson	One Battle After Another	
2025 (25th)	Kathryn Bigelow	A House of Dynamite	
2025 (25th)	Scott Cooper	Springsteen: Deliver Me from Nowhere	
2025 (25th)	Spike Lee	Highest 2 Lowest	

== Multiple wins and nominations ==
=== Multiple wins ===
Wins	Director
2	Guillermo del Toro
2	Steven Spielberg

=== Multiple nominations ===
Nominations	Director
7	Steven Spielberg
7	Martin Scorsese
6	Clint Eastwood
5	Ridley Scott
3	Kathryn Bigelow
3	Kenneth Branagh
3	Guillermo del Toro
3	Paul Greengrass
3	Spike Lee
3	Michael Mann
2	Woody Allen
2	Danny Boyle
2	Alfonso Cuarón
2	Lee Daniels
2	Stephen Frears
2	Paul Haggis
2	Ron Howard
2	Alejandro González Iñárritu
2	Ang Lee
2	Mike Nichols
2	David O. Russell
2	Gus Van Sant

== See also ==
- Academy Award for Best Director
- Golden Globe Award for Best Director
- BAFTA Award for Best Direction
- Directors Guild of America Award for Outstanding Directing – Feature Film
- Critics' Choice Movie Award for Best Director
- Independent Spirit Award for Best Director
