= AARP Movies for Grownups Award for Best Actress =

Annual US film award

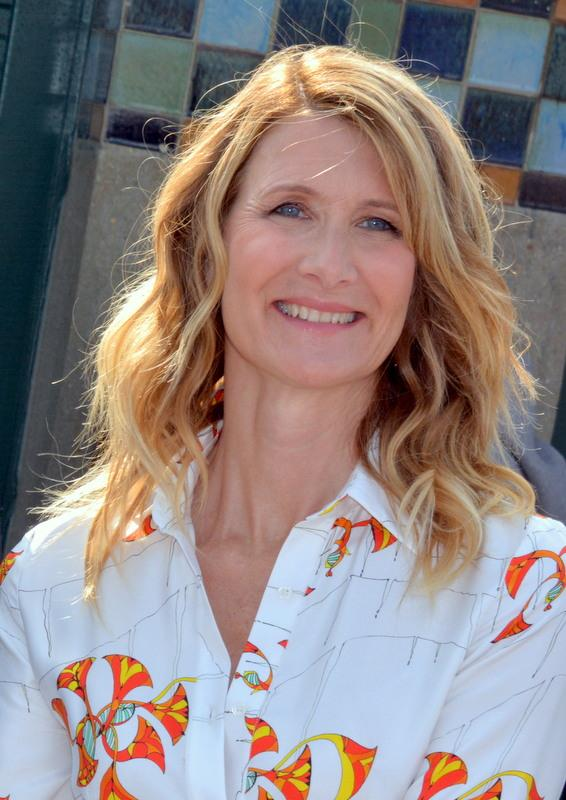
- The 2025 recipient: Laura Dern
- Awarded for: Best Actress over 50
- Country: United States
- Presented by: AARP
- First award: Charlotte Rampling for Under the Sand (2001)
- Currently held by: Laura Dern for Is This Thing On? (2025)
- Website: https://www.aarp.org/entertainment/movies-for-grownups/ Movies for Grownups

The AARP Movies for Grownups Award for Best Actress is one of the AARP Movies for Grownups Awards presented annually by the AARP since the awards' inception in 2002. The award honors the best actress over the age of fifty. The Best Actress Award is one of the seven original trophies issued by AARP the Magazine, along with awards for Best Movie for Grownups, Best Director, Best Actor, Best Foreign Film, Best Documentary, and Best Movie for Grownups Who Refuse to Grow Up.

== Winners and Nominees ==
indicates the winners.

=== 2000s ===
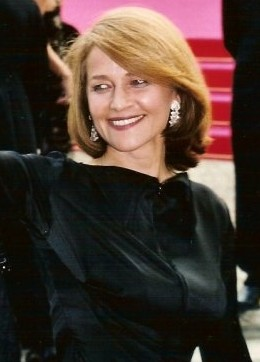
Charlotte Rampling won the first Best Actress award for her performance in Under the Sand.

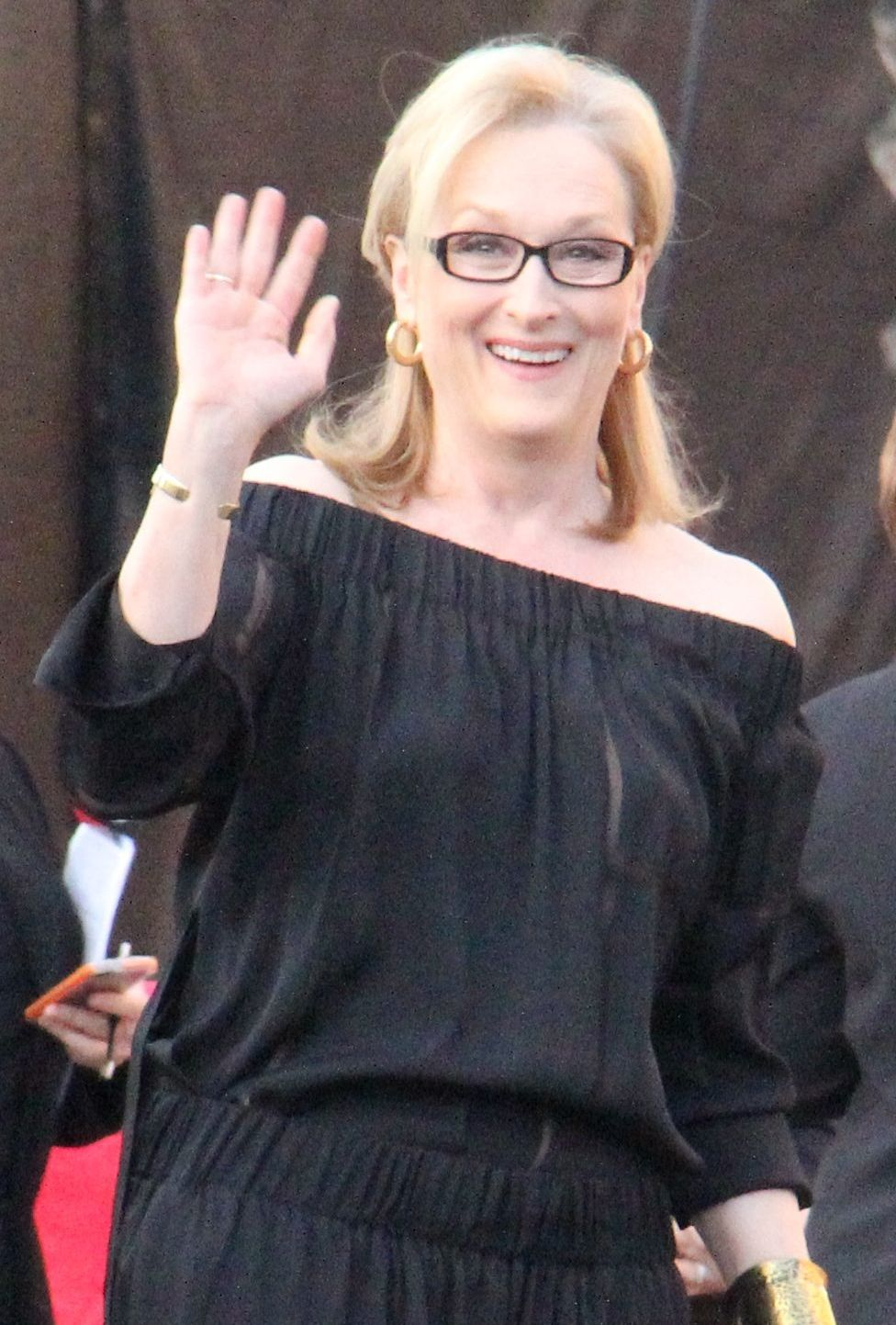
Meryl Streep, who holds the record for the most Best Actress nominations, won on her first nomination in 2002.

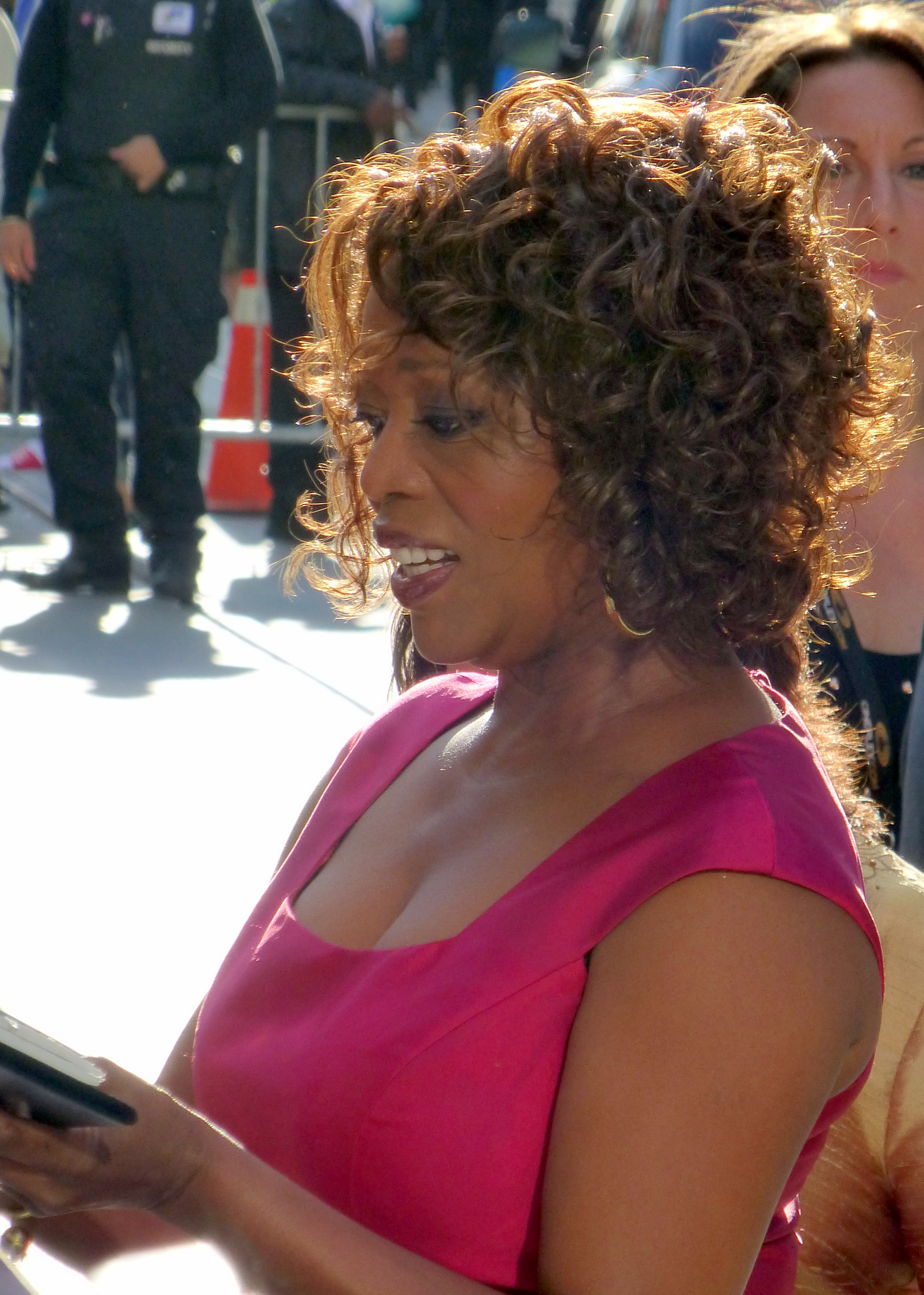
Alfre Woodard was the first Black nominee for Best Actress.

Year	Actress	Role(s)	Film	Ref.
2001 (1st)	Charlotte Rampling ‡	Marie Drillon	Under the Sand	
2001 (1st)	Helen Mirren	Mrs. Wilson	Gosford Park	
2001 (1st)	Maggie Smith	Constance, Countess of Trentham	Gosford Park	
2001 (1st)	Sissy Spacek	Ruth Fowler	In the Bedroom	
2002 (2nd)	Meryl Streep ‡	Susan Orlean	Adaptation	
2002 (2nd)	Judi Dench	Lady Bracknell	The Importance of Being Earnest	
2002 (2nd)	Susan Sarandon	Mimi Slocumb and Jojo Floss	Igby Goes Down and Moonlight Mile	
2002 (2nd)	Sigourney Weaver	Joan	The Guys	
2003 (3rd)	Diane Keaton ‡	Erica Barry	Something's Gotta Give	
2003 (3rd)	Geraldine McEwan	Sister Bridget	The Magdalene Sisters	
2003 (3rd)	Helen Mirren	Chris Harper	Calendar Girls	
2003 (3rd)	Catherine O'Hara	Mickey Crabbe	A Mighty Wind	
2004 (4th)	Anne Reid ‡	May	The Mother	
2004 (4th)	Cloris Leachman	Evelyn Wright	Spanglish	
2004 (4th)	Gena Rowlands	Old Allie Calhoun	The Notebook	
2004 (4th)	Susan Sarandon	Beverly Clark	Shall We Dance?	
2004 (4th)	Meryl Streep	Senator Eleanor Prentiss Shaw	The Manchurian Candidate	
2004 (4th)	Lily Tomlin	Vivian Jaffe	I Heart Huckabees	
2005 (5th)	Joan Plowright ‡	Sarah Palfrey	Mrs. Palfrey at the Claremont	
2005 (5th)	Judi Dench	Ursula Widdington	Ladies in Lavender	
2005 (5th)	Shirley MacLaine	Ella Hirsch	In Her Shoes	
2005 (5th)	Meryl Streep	Lisa Metzger Bloomberg	Prime	
2005 (5th)	Liv Ullmann	Marianne	Saraband	
2006 (6th)	Helen Mirren ‡	Queen Elizabeth II	The Queen	
2006 (6th)	Judi Dench	Barbara Covett	Notes on a Scandal	
2006 (6th)	Catherine O'Hara	Marilyn Hack	For Your Consideration	
2006 (6th)	Maggie Smith	Rosie Jones/Grace Hawkins	Keeping Mum	
2006 (6th)	Meryl Streep	Miranda Priestly	The Devil Wears Prada	
2007 (7th)	Julie Christie ‡	Fiona	Away from Her	
2007 (7th)	Sally Field	Anita Bergman	Two Weeks	
2007 (7th)	Vanessa Redgrave	Ann Grant Lord	Evening	
2007 (7th)	Meryl Streep	Janine Roth	Lions for Lambs	
2008 (8th)	Meryl Streep ‡	Sister Aloysius Beauvier	Doubt	
2008 (8th)	Annette Bening	Sylvie Fowler	The Women	
2008 (8th)	Catherine Deneuve	Junon Vuillard	A Christmas Tale	
2008 (8th)	Frances McDormand	Linda Litzke	Burn After Reading	
2008 (8th)	Alfre Woodard	Alice Reynolds-Evans	Tyler Perry's The Family That Preys	
2009 (9th)	Helen Mirren ‡	Sophia Tolstaya	The Last Station	
2009 (9th)	Ellen Burstyn	Mary	Lovely, Still	
2009 (9th)	Meryl Streep	Jane Adler	It's Complicated	
2009 (9th)	Meryl Streep	Julia Child	Julie & Julia	

=== 2010s ===
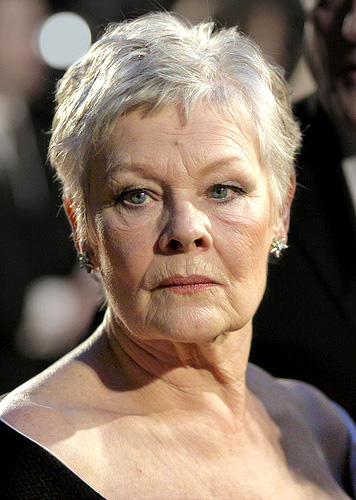
Judi Dench won in 2012 for The Best Exotic Marigold Hotel, her fifth Best Actress nomination.

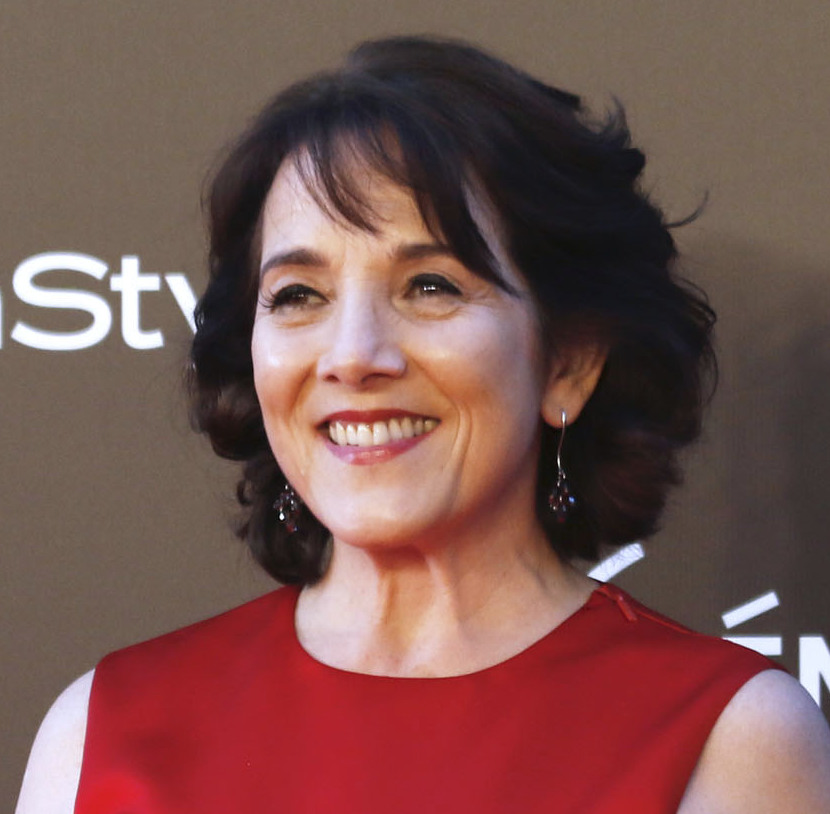
Paulina García was the first nominee from outside Europe or North America, for her performance in Gloria.

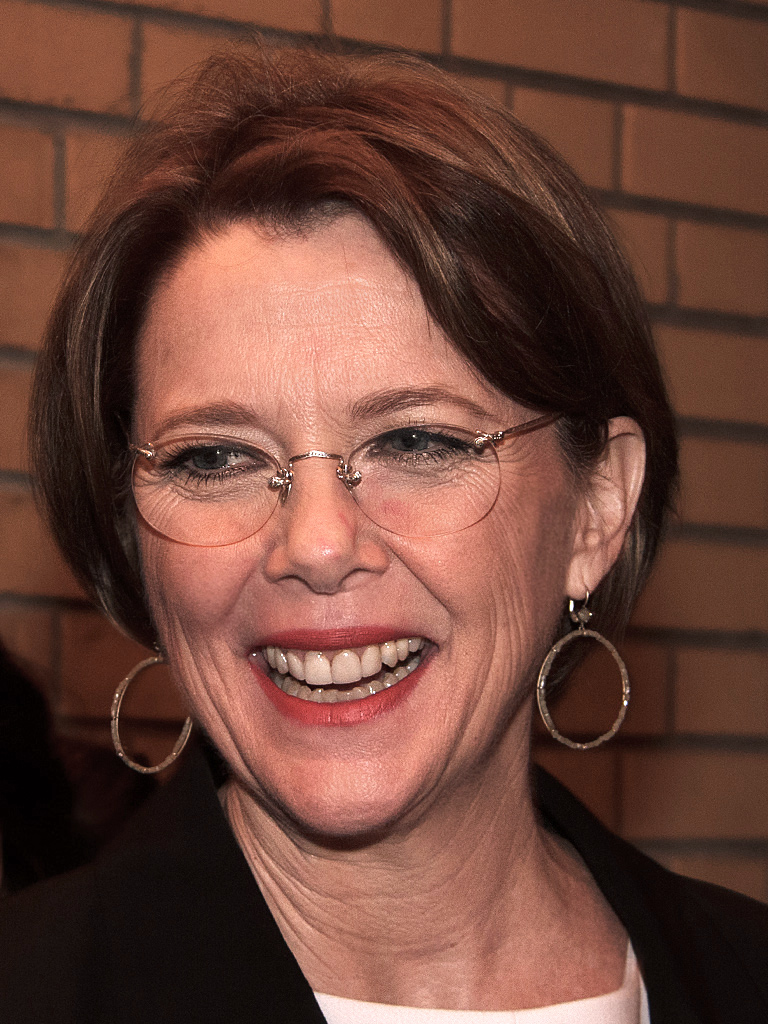
Annette Bening won back-to-back Best Actress awards in 2016 and 2017.

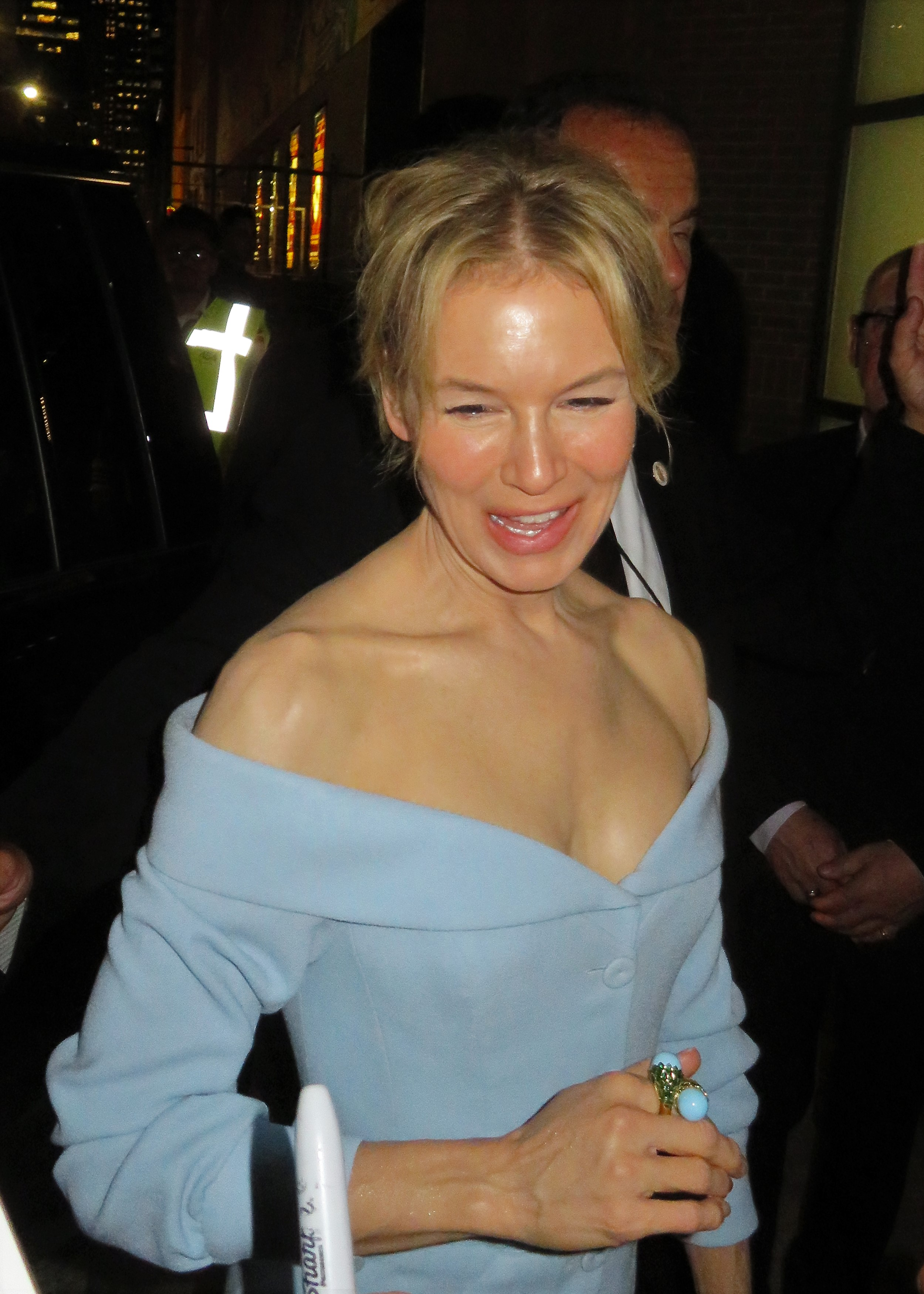
Renée Zellweger won Best Actress for Judy in her first year of eligibility.

Year	Actress	Role(s)	Film	Ref.
2010 (10th)	Lesley Manville ‡	Mary Smith	Another Year	
2010 (10th)	Annette Bening	Dr. Nicole "Nic" Allgood	The Kids Are All Right	
2010 (10th)	Julianne Moore	Jules Allgood	The Kids Are All Right	
2010 (10th)	Vanessa Redgrave	Claire	Letters to Juliet	
2010 (10th)	Tilda Swinton	Emma Recchi	I Am Love	
2011 (11th)	Glenn Close ‡	Albert Nobbs	Albert Nobbs	
2011 (11th)	Ellen Barkin	Lynn Hellman	Another Happy Day	
2011 (11th)	Helen Mirren	Rachel Singer	The Debt	
2011 (11th)	Meryl Streep	Margaret Thatcher	The Iron Lady	
2011 (11th)	Tilda Swinton	Eva Khatchadourian	We Need to Talk About Kevin	
2012 (12th)	Judi Dench ‡	Evelyn Greenslade	The Best Exotic Marigold Hotel	
2012 (12th)	Ann Dowd	Sandra Frum	Compliance	
2012 (12th)	Helen Mirren	Alma Reville	Hitchcock	
2012 (12th)	Emmanuelle Riva	Anne Laurent	Amour	
2012 (12th)	Meryl Streep	Kay Soames	Hope Springs	
2013 (13th)	Judi Dench ‡	Philomena Lee	Philomena	
2013 (13th)	Paulina García	Gloria Cumplido	Gloria	
2013 (13th)	Julia Louis-Dreyfus	Eva	Enough Said	
2013 (13th)	Meryl Streep	Violet Weston	August: Osage County	
2013 (13th)	Emma Thompson	Pamela "P.L." Travers	Saving Mr. Banks	
2014 (14th)	Julianne Moore ‡	Alice Daly Howland	Still Alice	
2014 (14th)	Lindsay Duncan	Meg Burrows	Le Week-End	
2014 (14th)	Jane Fonda	Hilary Altman	This Is Where I Leave You	
2014 (14th)	Diane Keaton	Leah	And So It Goes	
2014 (14th)	Maggie Smith	Mathilde Girard	My Old Lady	
2015 (15th)	Lily Tomlin ‡	Elle	Grandma	
2015 (15th)	Blythe Danner	Carol Petersen	I'll See You in My Dreams	
2015 (15th)	Helen Mirren	Maria Altmann	Woman in Gold	
2015 (15th)	Charlotte Rampling	Kate Mercer	45 Years	
2015 (15th)	Maggie Smith	Miss Mary Shepherd/Margaret Fairchild	The Lady in the Van	
2016 (16th)	Annette Bening ‡	Dorothea Fields	20th Century Women	
2016 (16th)	Sally Field	Doris Miller	Hello, My Name Is Doris	
2016 (16th)	Isabelle Huppert	Michèle Leblanc	Elle	
2016 (16th)	Meryl Streep	Florence Foster Jenkins	Florence Foster Jenkins	
2016 (16th)	Tilda Swinton	Marianne Lane	A Bigger Splash	
2017 (17th)	Annette Bening ‡	Gloria Grahame	Film Stars Don't Die in Liverpool	
2017 (17th)	Judi Dench	Queen Victoria	Victoria & Abdul	
2017 (17th)	Salma Hayek	Beatriz	Beatriz at Dinner	
2017 (17th)	Frances McDormand	Mildred Hayes	Three Billboards Outside Ebbing, Missouri	
2017 (17th)	Meryl Streep	Katharine Graham	The Post	
2018 (18th)	Glenn Close ‡	Joan Castleman	The Wife	
2018 (18th)	Sandra Bullock	Malorie Hayes	Bird Box	
2018 (18th)	Viola Davis	Veronica Rawlings	Widows	
2018 (18th)	Nicole Kidman	Erin Bell	Destroyer	
2018 (18th)	Julia Roberts	Holly Burns-Beeby	Ben Is Back	
2019 (19th)	Renée Zellweger ‡	Judy Garland	Judy	
2019 (19th)	Isabelle Huppert	Frankie	Frankie	
2019 (19th)	Helen Mirren	Betty McLeish/Lili Schröeder	The Good Liar	
2019 (19th)	Julianne Moore	Gloria Bell	Gloria Bell	
2019 (19th)	Alfre Woodard	Bernadine Williams	Clemency	

=== 2020s ===
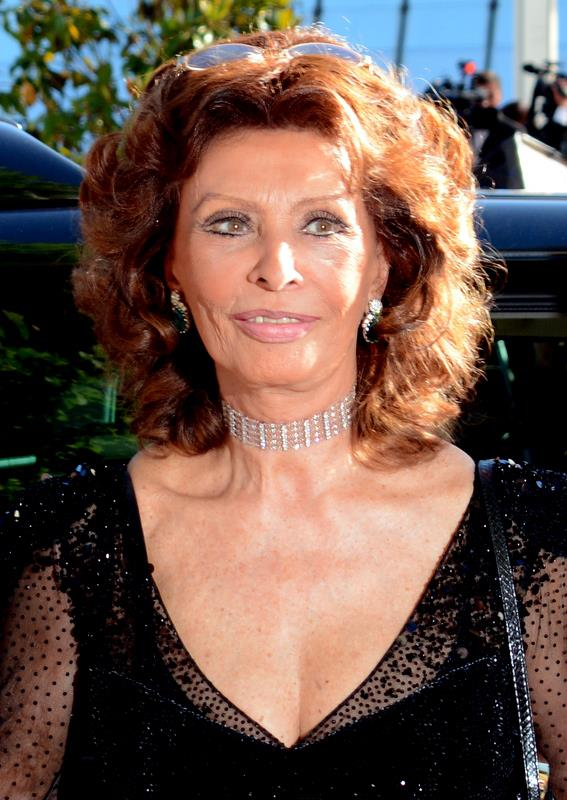
Sophia Loren became the oldest winner at the age of 86 for her performance in The Life Ahead.

Year	Actor	Role(s)	Film	Ref.
2020 (20th)	Sophia Loren ‡	Madame Rosa	The Life Ahead	
2020 (20th)	Viola Davis	Ma Rainey	Ma Rainey's Black Bottom	
2020 (20th)	Frances McDormand	Fern	Nomadland	
2020 (20th)	Michelle Pfeiffer	Frances Price	French Exit	
2020 (20th)	Robin Wright	Edee Holzer	Land	
2021 (21st)	Nicole Kidman‡	Lucille Ball	Being the Ricardos	
2021 (21st)	Halle Berry	Jackie "Pretty Bull" Justice	Bruised	
2021 (21st)	Sandra Bullock	Ruth Slater	The Unforgivable	
2021 (21st)	Frances McDormand	Lady Macbeth	The Tragedy of Macbeth	
2021 (21st)	Helen Mirren	Dorothy Bunton	The Duke	
2022 (22nd)	Michelle Yeoh ‡	Evelyn Quan Wang	Everything Everywhere All at Once	
2022 (22nd)	Cate Blanchett	Lydia Tár	TÁR	
2022 (22nd)	Viola Davis	General Nanisca	The Woman King	
2022 (22nd)	Lesley Manville	Ada Harris	Mrs. Harris Goes to Paris	
2022 (22nd)	Emma Thompson	Nancy Stokes/Susan Robinson	Good Luck to You, Leo Grande	
2023 (23rd)	Annette Bening‡	Diana Nyad	Nyad	
2023 (23rd)	Juliette Binoche	Eugénie	The Taste of Things	
2023 (23rd)	Aunjanue Ellis-Taylor	Isabel Wilkerson	Origin	
2023 (23rd)	Helen Mirren	Golda Meir	Golda	
2023 (23rd)	Julia Roberts	Amanda Sandford	Leave the World Behind	
2024 (24th)	Demi Moore‡	Elisabeth Sparkle	The Substance	
2024 (24th)	Pamela Anderson	Shelly Gardner	The Last Showgirl	
2024 (24th)	Marianne Jean-Baptiste	Pansy Deacon	Hard Truths	
2024 (24th)	Nicole Kidman	Romy Mathis	Babygirl	
2024 (24th)	June Squibb	Thelma	Thelma	
2025 (25th)	Laura Dern ‡	Tess Novak	Is This Thing On?	
2025 (25th)	Jodie Foster	Lilian Steiner	A Private Life	
2025 (25th)	Lucy Liu	Irene	Rosemead	
2025 (25th)	Julia Roberts	Alma Imhoff	After the Hunt	
2025 (25th)	June Squibb	Eleanor Morgenstein	Eleanor the Great	

== Multiple wins and nominations ==
The following individuals received two or more Best Actress awards:

Wins	Actress	Nominations
3	Annette Bening	5
2	Glenn Close	2
2	Judi Dench	6
2	Helen Mirren	10
2	Meryl Streep	13

The following individuals received multiple Best Actress nominations:

Nominations	Actress
13	Meryl Streep
10	Helen Mirren
6	Judi Dench
5	Annette Bening
4	Frances McDormand
4	Maggie Smith
3	Viola Davis
3	Julianne Moore
3	Tilda Swinton
3	Nicole Kidman
3	Julia Roberts
2	Sandra Bullock
2	Glenn Close
2	Sally Field
2	Isabelle Huppert
2	Diane Keaton
2	Lesley Manville
2	Catherine O'Hara
2	Charlotte Rampling
2	Vanessa Redgrave
2	Susan Sarandon
2	June Squibb
2	Emma Thompson
2	Lily Tomlin
2	Alfre Woodard

== Age superlatives ==
Record	Actress	Film	Age (in years)
Oldest winner	Sophia Loren	The Life Ahead	86
Oldest nominee	June Squibb	Eleanor the Great	96
Youngest winner	Renée Zellweger	Judy	50
Youngest nominee	Renée Zellweger	Judy	50

== See also ==
- Academy Award for Best Actress
- BAFTA Award for Best Actress in a Leading Role
- César Award for Best Actress
- Critics' Choice Movie Award for Best Actress
- Golden Globe Award for Best Actress in a Motion Picture – Drama
- Golden Globe Award for Best Actress – Motion Picture Comedy or Musical
- Independent Spirit Award for Best Female Lead
- Screen Actors Guild Award for Outstanding Performance by a Female Actor in a Leading Role
