= 18th AARP Movies for Grownups Awards =

Film award ceremony

- Presented on: February 15, 2019
- Date: February 4, 2019
- Hosted by: Martin Short

Highlights
- Most awards: Can You Ever Forgive Me?, Green Book (2)
- Most nominations: All is True, Green Book, Roma (4)

Television coverage
- Network: PBS

The 18th AARP Movies for Grownups Awards, presented by AARP the Magazine, honored films released in 2018 and were announced on February 4, 2019. The awards recognized films created by and about people over the age of 50. The ceremony was hosted by actor and comedian Martin Short, and was broadcast on PBS on February 15, 2019 as part of its Great Performances series.

== Awards ==
=== Winners and Nominees ===
Winners are listed first, highlighted in boldface, and indicated with a double dagger (‡).

**Best Movie for Grownups**: **Green Book**‡; BlacKkKlansman; Can You Ever Forgive Me?; Roma; A Star is Born	**Best Director**: **Spike Lee – BlacKkKlansman**‡; Kenneth Branagh - All is True; Alfonso Cuaron - Roma; Peter Farrelly - Green Book; Mimi Leder - On the Basis of Sex
**Best Actor**: **Viggo Mortensen - Green Book**‡; Willem Dafoe - At Eternity's Gate; Hugh Jackman - The Front Runner; Robert Redford - The Old Man & the Gun; John C. Reilly - Stan & Ollie	**Best Actress**: **Glenn Close - The Wife**‡; Sandra Bullock - Bird Box; Viola Davis - Widows; Nicole Kidman - Destroyer; Julia Roberts - Ben Is Back
**Best Supporting Actor**: **Richard E. Grant - Can You Ever Forgive Me?**‡; Robert Duvall - Widows; Sam Elliott - A Star is Born; Robert Forster - What They Had; Ian McKellen - All is True	**Best Supporting Actress**: **Judi Dench - All is True**‡; Angela Bassett - Black Panther; Blythe Danner - What They Had; Nicole Kidman - Boy Erased; Michelle Yeoh - Crazy Rich Asians
**Best Screenwriter**: **Nicole Holofcener, Jeff Whitty - Can You Ever Forgive Me?**‡; Peter Farrelly, Brian Hayes Curie, Nick Vallelonga - Green Book; Deborah Davis, Tony McNamara - The Favourite; Peter Hedges - Ben Is Back; Paul Schrader - First Reformed	**Best Ensemble**: **Bohemian Rhapsody**‡; Black Panther; Crazy Rich Asians; The Front Runner; Widows
**Best Intergenerational Film**: **Mary Poppins Returns**‡; A Quiet Place; Beautiful Boy; Ben Is Back; Crazy Rich Asians	**Best Grownup Love Story**: **What They Had**‡; All is True; On the Basis of Sex; Private Life; The Old Man & the Gun
**Best Time Capsule**: **If Beale Street Could Talk**‡; BlacKkKlansman; Bohemian Rhapsody; First Man; Roma
**Best Documentary**: **Won't You Be My Neighbor?**‡; Amazing Grace; Bathtubs Over Broadway; RBG; The Rest I Make Up	**Best Foreign Film**: **Roma - Mexico**‡; Cold War - Poland, France, United Kingdom; Never Look Away - Germany; Shoplifters - Japan; The Guilty - Denmark

=== Career Achievement Award ===
- Shirley MacLaine: "Few have done more for grownup filmmaking than MacLaine, who's averaged one new film or show every six months since turning 80."

=== Films with multiple nominations and awards ===
Films that received multiple nominations
Nominations	Film
4	All is True
4	Green Book
4	Roma
3	Ben Is Back
3	BlacKkKlansman
3	Can You Ever Forgive Me?
3	Crazy Rich Asians
3	What They Had
3	Widows
2	Black Panther
2	Bohemian Rhapsody
2	The Front Runner
2	The Old Man & the Gun
2	On the Basis of Sex
2	A Star is Born

Films that received multiple awards
Wins	Film
2	Can You Ever Forgive Me?
2	Green Book
