= AARP Movies for Grownups Award for Best Actor =

Annual US film award

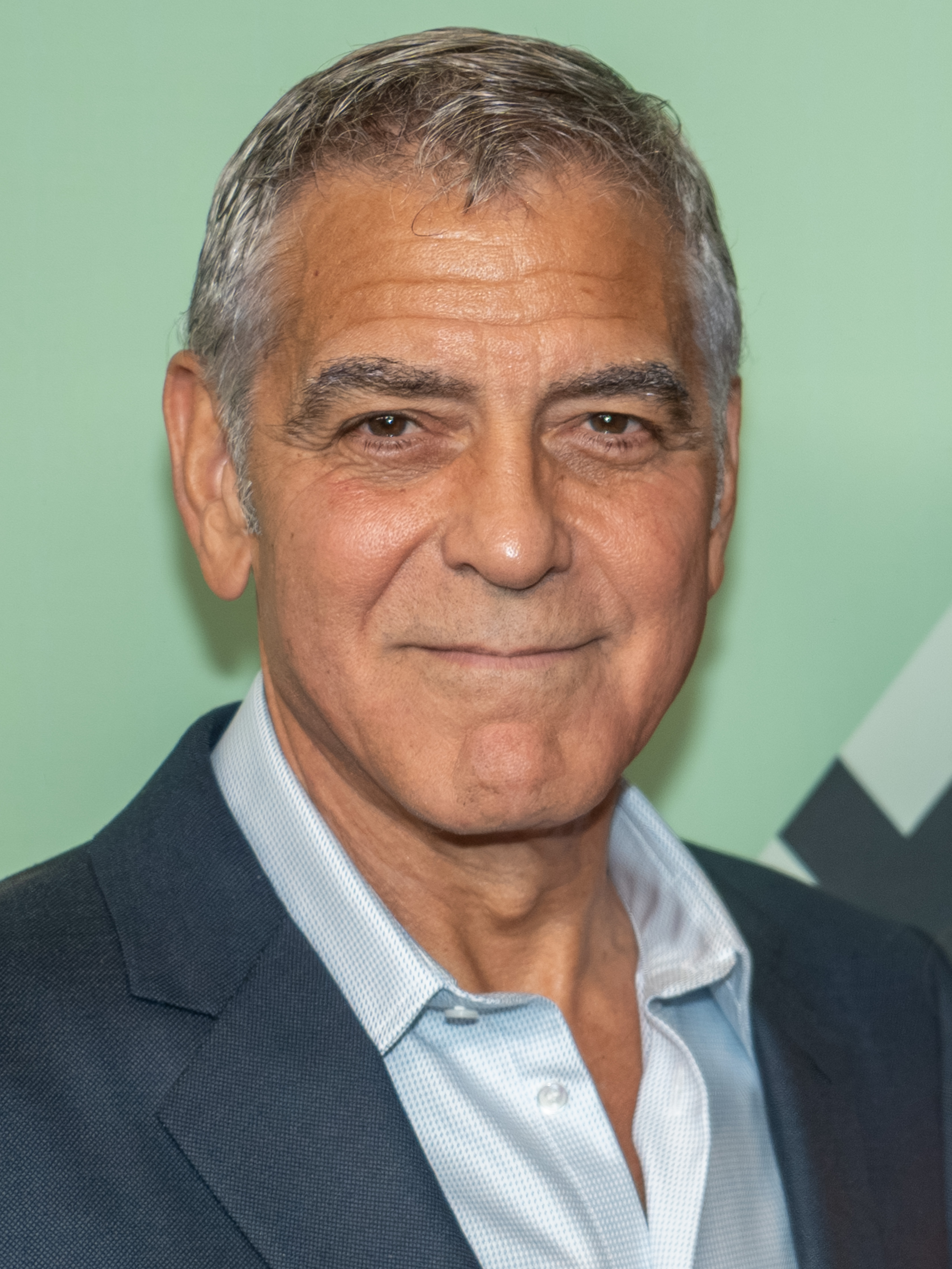
- The 2025 recipient: George Clooney
- Awarded for: Best Actor over 50
- Country: United States
- Presented by: AARP
- First award: Tom Wilkinson for In the Bedroom (2001)
- Currently held by: George Clooney for Jay Kelly (2025)
- Website: https://www.aarp.org/entertainment/movies-for-grownups/

The AARP Movies for Grownups Award for Best Actor is one of the AARP Movies for Grownups Awards presented annually by the AARP since the awards' inception in 2002. The award honors the best actor over the age of fifty. The Best Actor Award is one of the seven original trophies issued by AARP the Magazine, along with awards for Best Movie for Grownups, Best Director, Best Actress, Best Foreign Film, Best Documentary, and Best Movie for Grownups Who Refuse to Grow Up.

== Winners and Nominees ==
indicates the winners.

=== 2000s ===
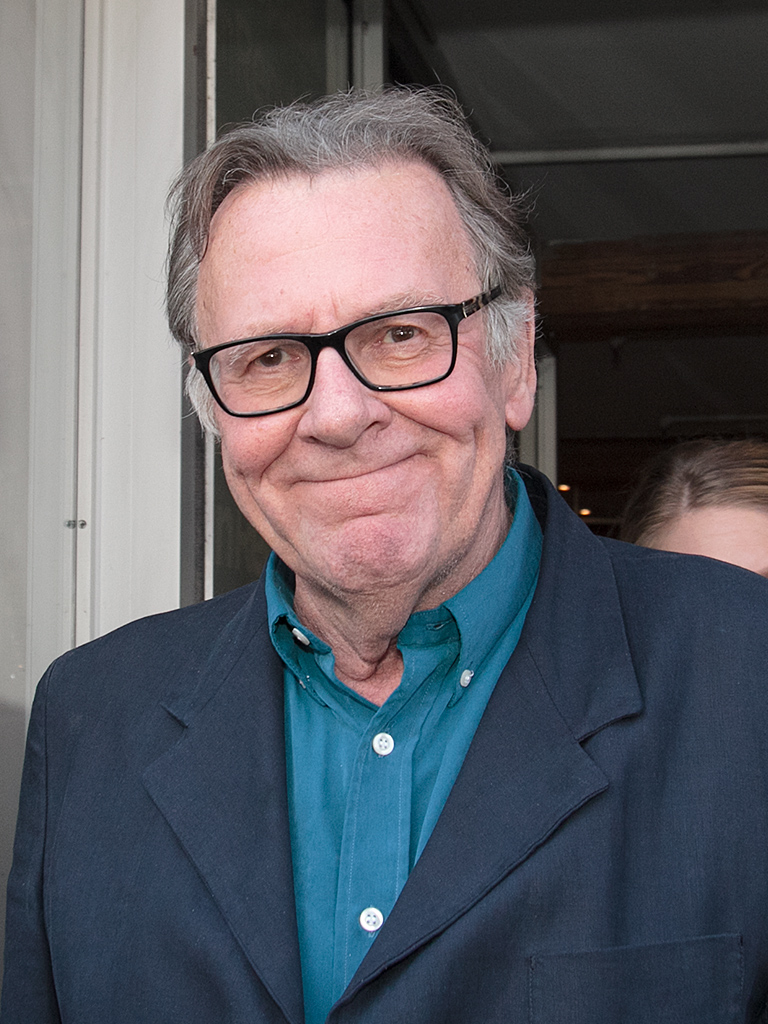
Tom Wilkinson won Best Actor at the 1st AARP Movies for Grownups Awards for his performance in In the Bedroom.

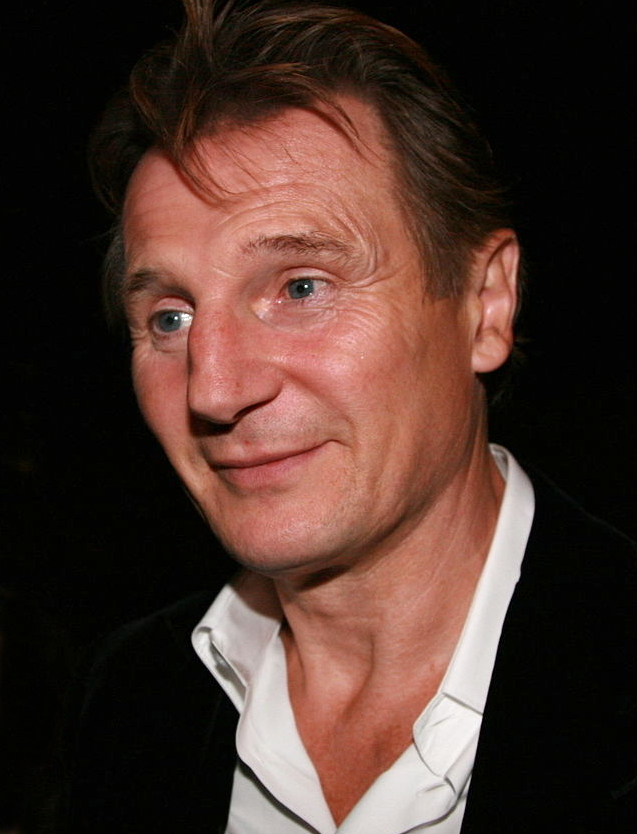
Liam Neeson was the first person to win Best Actor for playing a real person, sexologist Alfred Kinsey.

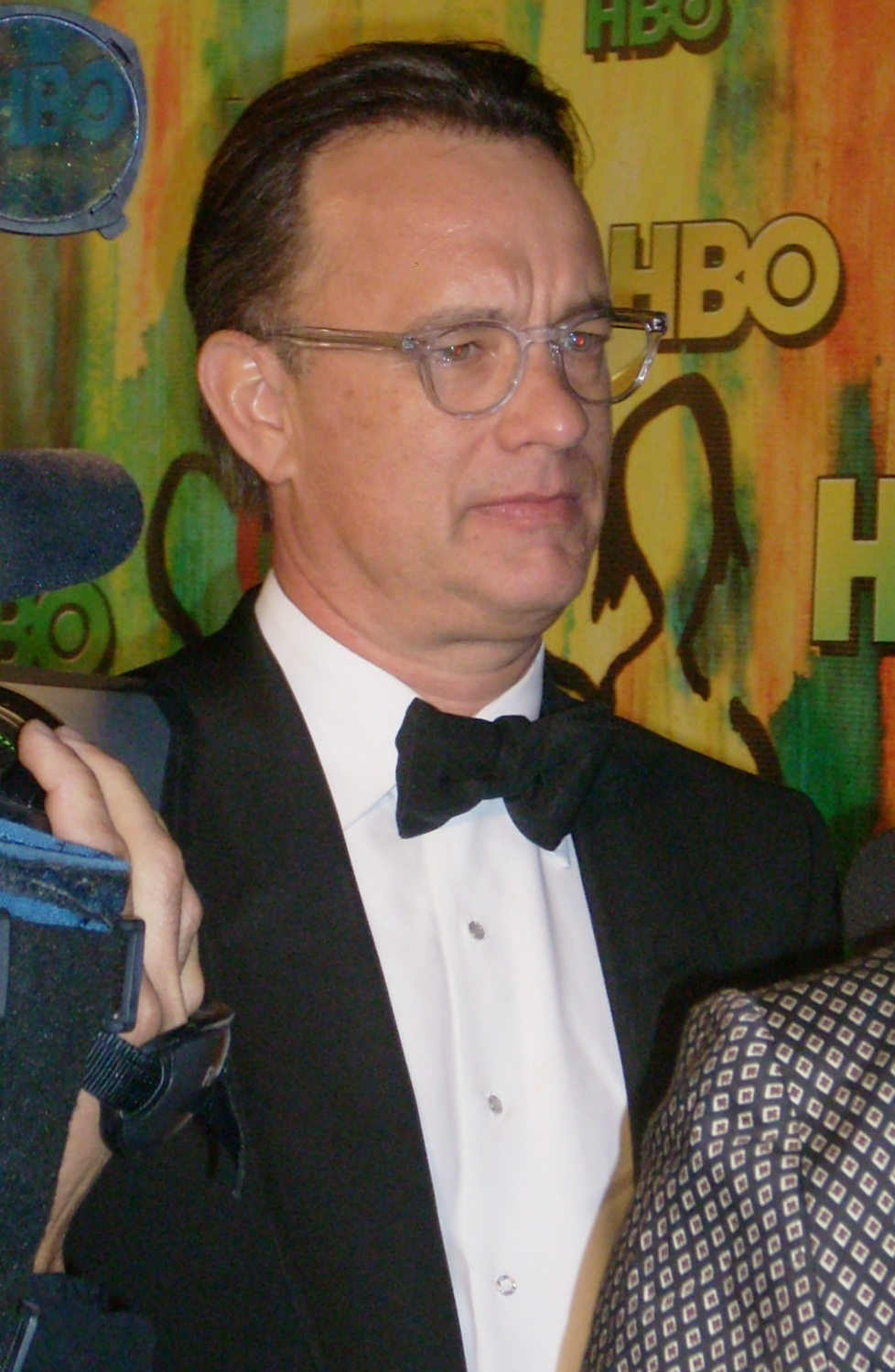
Tom Hanks was nominated for Charlie Wilson's War in his first year of eligibility. He is the most-nominated actor in AARP history.

Year	Actor	Role(s)	Film	Ref.
2001 (1st)	Tom Wilkinson	Matt Fowler	In the Bedroom	
2001 (1st)	Morgan Freeman	Dr. Alex Cross	Along Came a Spider	
2001 (1st)	Gene Hackman	Royal Tenenbaum	The Royal Tenenbaums	
2002 (2nd)	Jack Nicholson	Warren R. Schmidt	About Schmidt	
2002 (2nd)	Michael Caine	Thomas Fowler	The Quiet American	
2002 (2nd)	Dustin Hoffman	Ben Floss	Moonlight Mile	
2002 (2nd)	Samuel L. Jackson	Doyle Gipson	Changing Lanes	
2003 (3rd)	Bill Murray	Bob Harris	Lost in Translation	
2003 (3rd)	Albert Finney	Edward Bloom	Big Fish	
2003 (3rd)	Anthony Hopkins	Coleman Silk	The Human Stain	
2003 (3rd)	Tommy Lee Jones	Samuel Jones / Chaa-duu-ba-its-iidan	The Missing	
2003 (3rd)	Ben Kingsley	Colonel Massoud Amir Behrani	House of Sand and Fog	
2004 (4th)	Liam Neeson	Alfred Kinsey	Kinsey	
2004 (4th)	Jeff Bridges	Ted Cole	The Door in the Floor	
2004 (4th)	Richard Gere	John Clark	Shall We Dance?	
2004 (4th)	Dennis Quaid	Dan Foreman	In Good Company	
2004 (4th)	Kurt Russell	Herb Brooks	Miracle	
2004 (4th)	Omar Sharif	Monsieur Ibrahim	Monsieur Ibrahim	
2005 (5th)	Jeff Daniels	Bernard Berkman	The Squid and the Whale	
2005 (5th)	Anthony Hopkins	Burt Munro	The World's Fastest Indian	
2005 (5th)	Nathan Lane	Max Bialystock	The Producers	
2005 (5th)	Kurt Russell	Ben Crane	Dreamer: Inspired by a True Story	
2005 (5th)	Tom Wilkinson	James Manning	Separate Lies	
2006 (6th)	Donald Sutherland	Ronald Shorter	Aurora Borealis	
2006 (6th)	Gabriel Byrne	Harry	Wah-Wah	
2006 (6th)	Samuel L. Jackson	Detective Lorenzo Council	Freedomland	
2006 (6th)	Jack Nicholson	Frank Costello	The Departed	
2006 (6th)	Peter O'Toole	Maurice Russell	Venus	
2007 (7th)	Chris Cooper	Robert Hanssen	Breach	
2007 (7th)	Richard Gere	Clifford Irving	The Hoax	
2007 (7th)	Tom Hanks	Charlie Wilson	Charlie Wilson's War	
2007 (7th)	Tommy Lee Jones	Hank Deerfield	In the Valley of Elah	
2007 (7th)	Denzel Washington	Frank Lucas	American Gangster	
2008 (8th)	Frank Langella	Richard Nixon	Frost/Nixon	
2008 (8th)	Chris Cooper	Harry Allen	Married Life	
2008 (8th)	Clint Eastwood	Walt Kowalski	Gran Torino	
2008 (8th)	Richard Jenkins	Walter Vale	The Visitor	
2008 (8th)	Mickey Rourke	Robin Ramzinski / Randy "The Ram" Robinson	The Wrestler	
2009 (9th)	Jeff Bridges	Otis "Bad" Blake	Crazy Heart	
2009 (9th)	Daniel Day-Lewis	Guido Contini	Nine	
2009 (9th)	Robert De Niro	Frank Goode	Everybody's Fine	
2009 (9th)	Morgan Freeman	Nelson Mandela	Invictus	
2009 (9th)	Viggo Mortensen	Man	The Road	

=== 2010s ===
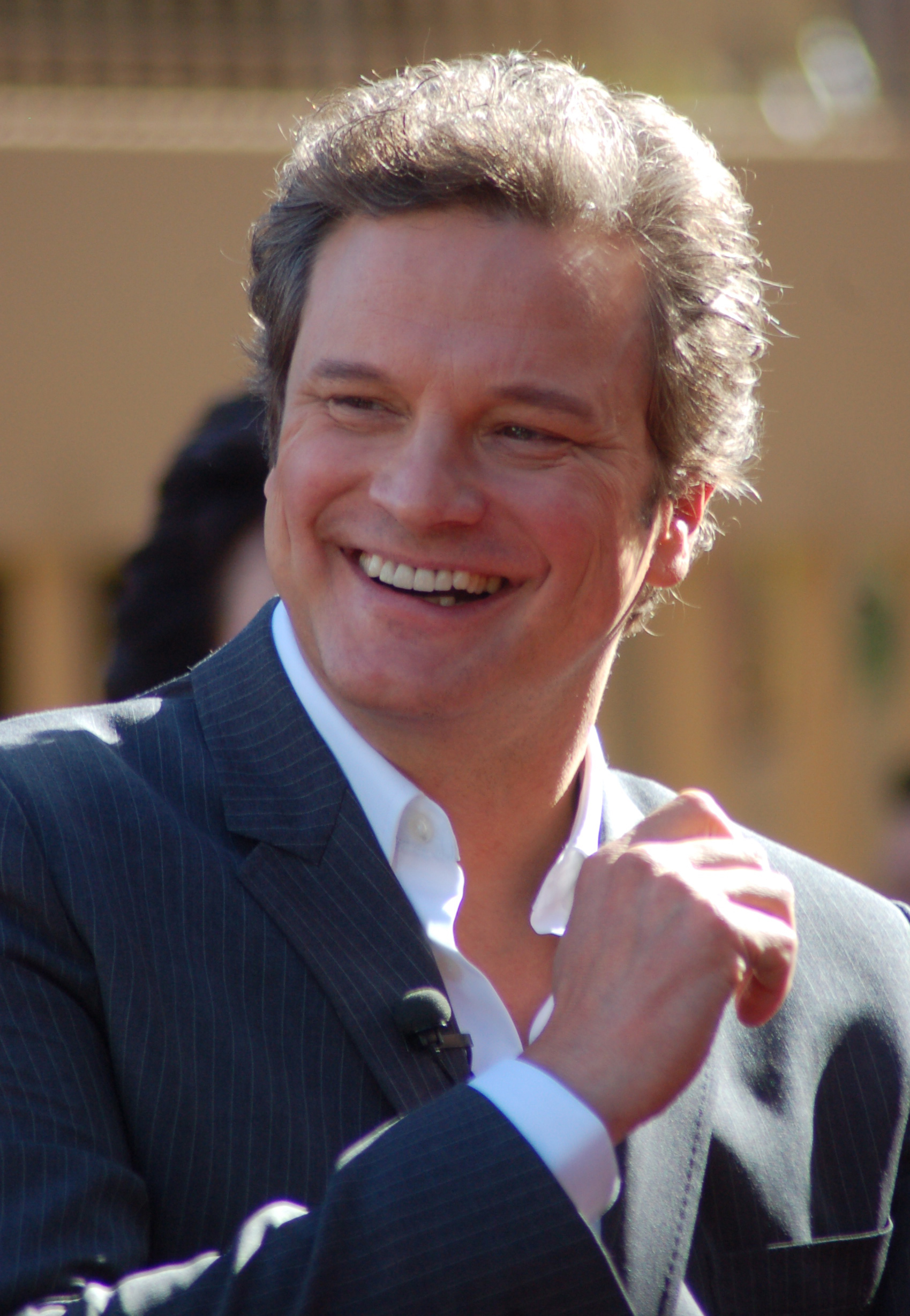
Colin Firth is the youngest winner to date; he was just 50 when he won for The King's Speech.

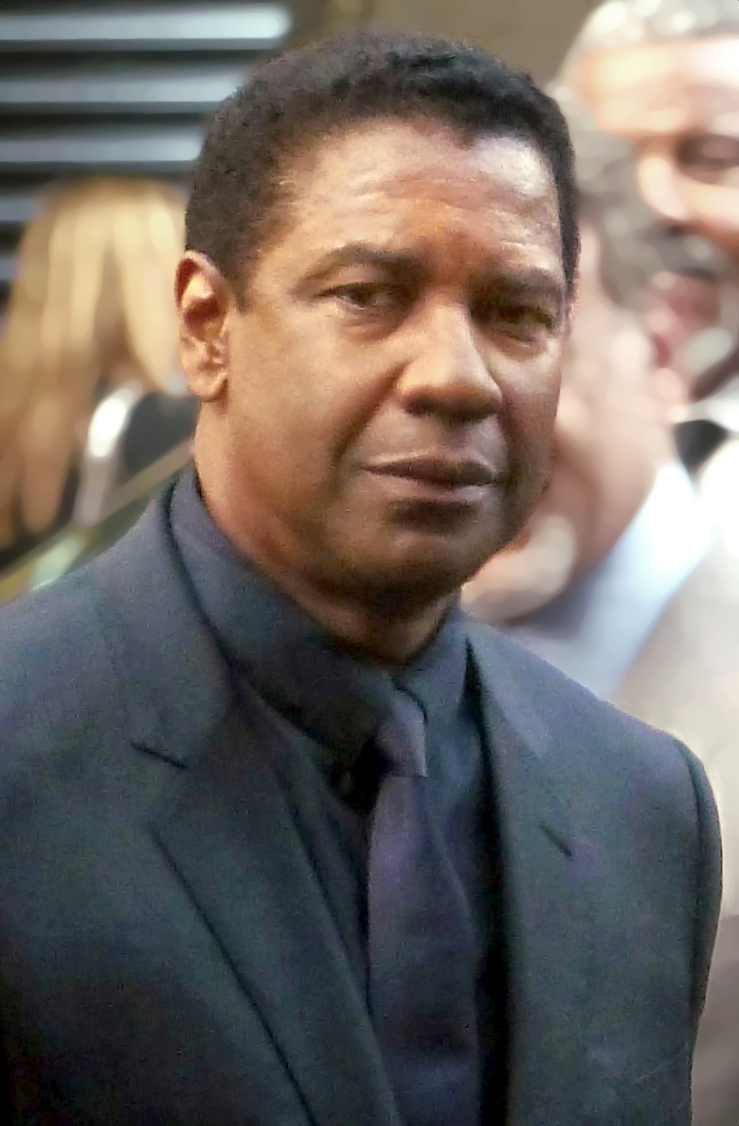
Denzel Washington was the first performer to win Best Actor more than once, receiving the award for Flight and Fences.

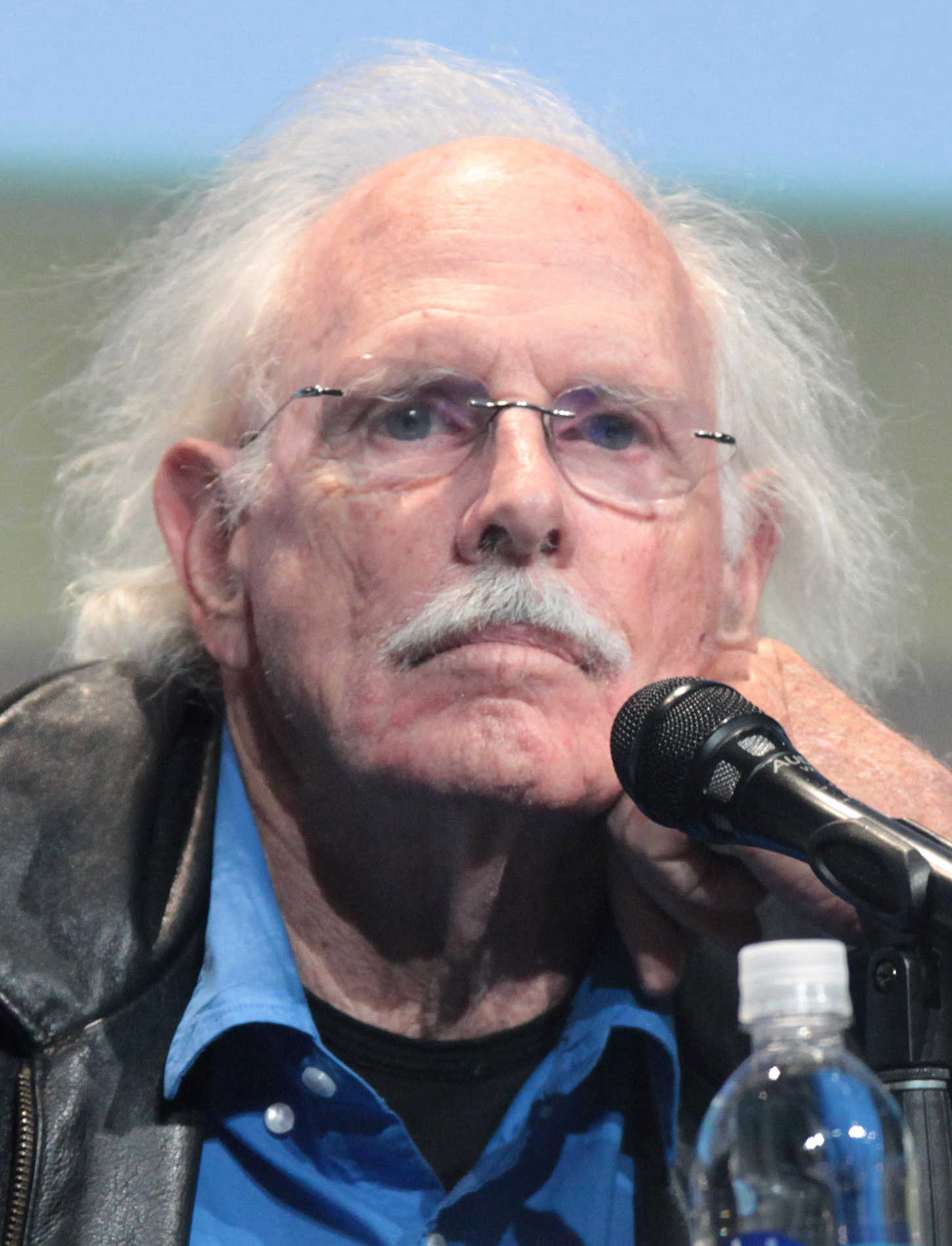
Bruce Dern was 77 when he won Best Actor for his performance in Nebraska.

Year	Actor	Role(s)	Film	Ref.
2010 (10th)	Colin Firth	King George VI	The King's Speech	
2010 (10th)	Michael Caine	Harold "Harry" Brown	Harry Brown	
2010 (10th)	Michael Douglas	Ben Kalmen	Solitary Man	
2010 (10th)	Robert Duvall	Felix Bush	Get Low	
2010 (10th)	Kevin Spacey	Jack Abramoff	Casino Jack	
2011 (11th)	Oliver Litondo	Kimani Maruge	The First Grader	
2011 (11th)	George Clooney	Matthew "Matt" King	The Descendants	
2011 (11th)	Mel Gibson	Walter Black/The Beaver	The Beaver	
2011 (11th)	Gary Oldman	George Smiley	Tinker Tailor Soldier Spy	
2011 (11th)	Kevin Spacey	Sam Rogers	Margin Call	
2012 (12th)	Denzel Washington	Whip Whitaker	Flight	
2012 (12th)	Daniel Day-Lewis	Abraham Lincoln	Lincoln	
2012 (12th)	John Hawkes	Mark O'Brien	The Sessions	
2012 (12th)	Anthony Hopkins	Alfred Hitchcock	Hitchcock	
2012 (12th)	Jean-Louis Trintignant	Georges Laurent	Amour	
2013 (13th)	Bruce Dern	Woodrow T. "Woody" Grant	Nebraska	
2013 (13th)	Tom Hanks	Richard "Rich" Phillips	Captain Phillips	
2013 (13th)	Brad Pitt	Gerry Lane	World War Z	
2013 (13th)	Robert Redford	Man	All Is Lost	
2013 (13th)	Forest Whitaker	Cecil Gaines	The Butler	
2014 (14th)	Steve Carell	John du Pont	Foxcatcher	
2014 (14th)	Michael Keaton	Riggan Thompson	Birdman or (The Unexpected Virtue of Ignorance)	
2014 (14th)	John Lithgow	Ben Hull	Love is Strange	
2014 (14th)	Bill Murray	Vincent MacKenna	St. Vincent	
2014 (14th)	Al Pacino	Simon Axler	The Humbling	
2015 (15th)	Bryan Cranston	Dalton Trumbo	Trumbo	
2015 (15th)	Michael Caine	Fred Ballinger	Youth	
2015 (15th)	Tom Courtenay	Geoff Mercer	45 Years	
2015 (15th)	Johnny Depp	James "Whitey" Bulger	Black Mass	
2015 (15th)	Ian McKellen	Sherlock Holmes	Mr. Holmes	
2016 (16th)	Denzel Washington	Troy Maxson	Fences	
2016 (16th)	Warren Beatty	Howard Hughes	Rules Don't Apply	
2016 (16th)	Tom Hanks	Chesley "Sully" Sullenberger	Sully	
2016 (16th)	Michael Keaton	Ray Kroc	The Founder	
2016 (16th)	Viggo Mortensen	Ben Cash	Captain Fantastic	
2017 (17th)	Gary Oldman	Winston Churchill	Darkest Hour	
2017 (17th)	Steve Carell	Bobby Riggs	Battle of the Sexes	
2017 (17th)	Daniel Day-Lewis	Reynolds Woodcock	Phantom Thread	
2017 (17th)	Tom Hanks	Ben Bradlee	The Post	
2017 (17th)	Denzel Washington	Roman J. Israel	Roman J. Israel, Esq.	
2018 (18th)	Viggo Mortensen	Tony Lip	Green Book	
2018 (18th)	Willem Dafoe	Vincent van Gogh	At Eternity's Gate	
2018 (18th)	Hugh Jackman	Gary Hart	The Front Runner	
2018 (18th)	Robert Redford	Forrest Tucker	The Old Man & the Gun	
2018 (18th)	John C. Reilly	Oliver "Ollie" Hardy	Stan & Ollie	
2019 (19th)	Adam Sandler	Howard Ratner	Uncut Gems	
2019 (19th)	Antonio Banderas	Salvador Mallo	Pain and Glory	
2019 (19th)	Robert De Niro	Frank Sheeran	The Irishman	
2019 (19th)	Eddie Murphy	Rudy Ray Moore	Dolemite Is My Name	
2019 (19th)	Jonathan Pryce	Cardinal Jorge Mario Bergoglio	The Two Popes	

=== 2020s ===
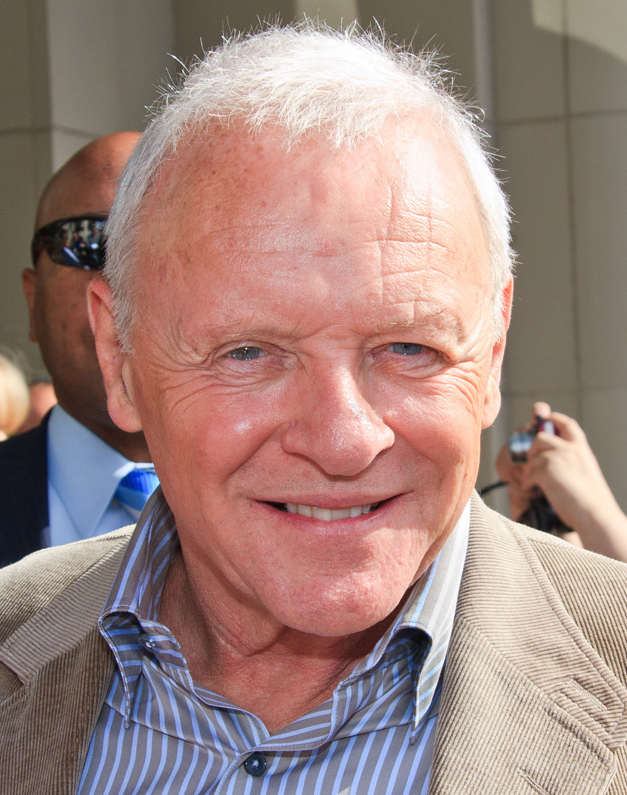
Anthony Hopkins won Best Actor at a virtual ceremony in 2021 due to the COVID-19 pandemic. At 83, he is the oldest winner to date.

Year	Actor	Role(s)	Film	Ref.
2020 (20th)	Anthony Hopkins	Anthony	The Father	
2020 (20th)	Ralph Fiennes	Basil Brown	The Dig	
2020 (20th)	Tom Hanks	Captain Jefferson Kyle Kidd	News of the World	
2020 (20th)	Delroy Lindo	Paul	Da 5 Bloods	
2020 (20th)	Gary Oldman	Herman J. "Mank" Mankiewicz	Mank	
2021 (21st)	Will Smith	Richard Williams	King Richard	
2021 (21st)	Javier Bardem	Desi Arnaz	Being the Ricardos	
2021 (21st)	Jim Broadbent	Kempton Bunton	The Duke	
2021 (21st)	Peter Dinklage	Cyrano de Bergerac	Cyrano	
2021 (21st)	Denzel Washington	Lord Macbeth	The Tragedy of Macbeth	
2022 (22nd)	Brendan Fraser	Charlie	The Whale	
2022 (22nd)	Tom Cruise	Captain Pete "Maverick" Mitchell	Top Gun: Maverick	
2022 (22nd)	Tom Hanks	Otto Anderson	A Man Called Otto	
2022 (22nd)	Bill Nighy	Mr. Williams	Living	
2022 (22nd)	Adam Sandler	Stanley Sugerman	Hustle	
2023 (23rd)	Colman Domingo	Bayard Rustin	Rustin	
2023 (23rd)	Nicolas Cage	Dr. Paul Matthews	Dream Scenario	
2023 (23rd)	Paul Giamatti	Paul Hunham	The Holdovers	
2023 (23rd)	Anthony Hopkins	Sigmund Freud	Freud's Last Session	
2023 (23rd)	Jeffrey Wright	Thelonious "Monk" Ellison	American Fiction	
2024 (24th)	Adrien Brody	László Tóth	The Brutalist	
2024 (24th)	Daniel Craig	William Lee	Queer	
2024 (24th)	Colman Domingo	John "Divine G" Whitfield	Sing Sing	
2024 (24th)	Ralph Fiennes	Cardinal Thomas Lawrence	Conclave	
2024 (24th)	Jude Law	Terry Husk	The Order	
2025 (25th)	George Clooney	Jay Kelly	Jay Kelly	
2025 (25th)	Leonardo DiCaprio	Bob Ferguson	One Battle After Another	
2025 (25th)	Joel Edgerton	Robert Grainier	Train Dreams	
2025 (25th)	Ethan Hawke	Lorenz Hart	Blue Moon	
2025 (25th)	Dwayne Johnson	Mark Kerr	The Smashing Machine	

== Multiple wins and nominations ==
=== Multiple wins ===
Wins	Actor
2	Denzel Washington

=== Multiple nominations ===
Nominations	Actor
6	Tom Hanks
5	Anthony Hopkins
5	Denzel Washington
3	Michael Caine
3	Daniel Day-Lewis
3	Viggo Mortensen
3	Gary Oldman
2	Jeff Bridges
2	Steve Carell
2	George Clooney
2	Chris Cooper
2	Robert De Niro
2	Colman Domingo
2	Ralph Fiennes
2	Morgan Freeman
2	Richard Gere
2	Samuel L. Jackson
2	Tommy Lee Jones
2	Michael Keaton
2	Ben Kingsley
2	Bill Murray
2	Jack Nicholson
2	Robert Redford
2	Kurt Russell
2	Adam Sandler
2	Kevin Spacey
2	Tom Wilkinson

== See also ==
- Academy Award for Best Actor
- BAFTA Award for Best Actor in a Leading Role
- Critics' Choice Movie Award for Best Actor
- Golden Globe Award for Best Actor – Motion Picture Drama
- Golden Globe Award for Best Actor – Motion Picture Musical or Comedy
- Independent Spirit Award for Best Male Lead
- Screen Actors Guild Award for Outstanding Performance by a Male Actor in a Leading Role
