= 2015 New York Film Festival =

53rd edition

- Opening film: The Walk
- Closing film: Miles Ahead
- Location: New York City, United States
- Founded: 1963
- Founded by: Richard Roud and Amos Vogel
- Hosted by: Film at Lincoln Center
- Artistic director: Kent Jones
- Festival date: September 25 – October 11, 2015
- Website: https://www.filmlinc.org/nyff/

New York Film Festival
- 2016 2014

The 53rd New York Film Festival took place from September 25 to October 11, 2015, in New York City, presented by Film at Lincoln Center.

The festival's opening film was Robert Zemeckis's The Walk. Danny Boyle's Steve Jobs was the centerpiece. Don Cheadle's Miles Ahead was the festival's closing film.

Appearing in NYFF's "Main Slate" for the first time were: Danny Boyle, Don Cheadle, John Crowley, Laura Israel, and Thomas Bidegain.

World premieres included: Don Cheadle's Miles Ahead, Jacob Bernstein's Everything Is Copy, Laura Israel's Don't Blink – Robert Frank, Robert Zemeckis's The Walk, and Paul Thomas Anderson's Junun.

== Official Selections ==
The primary selection committee included Kent Jones (chair), Dennis Lim, Marian Masone, Gavin Smith, and Amy Taubin. The lineup consisted of seven sections:

=== Main Slate ===
The following films were selected:

English Title	Original Title	Director(s)	Production Country
Arabian Nights	As Mil e uma Noites	Miguel Gomes	Portugal, France, Germany, Switzerland
The Assassin	聶隱娘	Hou Hsiao-hsien	Taiwan, China, Hong Kong
Bridge of Spies		Steven Spielberg	United States
Brooklyn		John Crowley	United Kingdom, Ireland, Canada
Carol		Todd Haynes	United States
Cemetery of Splendour	รักที่ขอนแก่น	Apichatpong Weerasethakul	Thailand, France, Germany, Malaysia
Les Cowboys		Thomas Bidegain	France
Don't Blink – Robert Frank		Laura Israel	United States, Canada
Experimenter		Michael Almereyda	United States
The Forbidden Room		Guy Maddin and Evan Johnson	Canada
In the Shadow of Women	L'Ombre des femmes	Philippe Garrel	France
Journey to the Shore	岸辺の旅	Kiyoshi Kurosawa	Japan, France
The Lobster		Yorgos Lanthimos	France, Netherlands, Greece, United Kingdom
Maggie's Plan		Rebecca Miller	United States
The Measure of a Man	La Loi du marché	Stéphane Brizé	France
Mia Madre		Nanni Moretti	Italy, France
Microbe & Gasoline	Microbe et Gasoil	Michel Gondry	France
Miles Ahead (closing film)		Don Cheadle	United States
Mountains May Depart	山河故人	Jia Zhangke	China, France, Japan
My Golden Days	Trois souvenirs de ma jeunesse	Arnaud Desplechin	France
No Home Movie		Chantal Akerman	Belgium, France
Right Now, Wrong Then	지금은맞고그때는틀리다	Hong Sang-soo	South Korea
Steve Jobs (centerpiece)		Danny Boyle	United States
The Treasure	Comoara	Corneliu Porumboiu	Romania
The Walk (opening film)		Robert Zemeckis	United States
Where to Invade Next		Michael Moore	United States

=== Special Events ===
The following films were selected:

English Title	Original Title	Director(s)	Production Country
Bring Me the Head of Tim Horton (short)		Guy Maddin, Evan Johnson and Galen Johnson	Canada
Chantal Akerman by Chantal Akerman (1997)	Chantal Akerman par Chantal Akerman	Chantal Akerman	France
Chevalier		Athina Rachel Tsangari	Greece
De Palma		Noah Baumbach and Jake Paltrow	United States
Heart of a Dog		Laurie Anderson	United States, France
Jeanne Dielman, 23 quai du Commerce, 1080 Bruxelles (1975)		Chantal Akerman	Belgium, France
Junun		Paul Thomas Anderson	United States
The Martian		Ridley Scott	United States
O Brother, Where Art Thou? (2000)		Joel and Ethan Coen	United States
Son of Saul	Saul fia	László Nemes	Hungary

=== Spotlight on Documentary ===
The following films were selected:

English Title	Original Title	Director(s)	Production Country
Everything Is Copy		Jacob Bernstein	United States
Fish Tail	Rabo de Peixe	Joaquim Pinto and Nuno Leonel	Portugal
Homeland: Iraq Year Zero	وطن: العراق السنة صفر	Abbas Fahdel	Iraq, France
Immigration Battle: Reasons to Believe		Michael Camerini and Shari Robertson	United States
Ingrid Bergman: In Her Own Words	Jag är Ingrid	Stig Björkman	Sweden
In Jackson Heights		Frederick Wiseman	United States
Jia Zhangke, A Guy from Fenyang		Walter Salles	Brazil, France
Rebel Citizen		Pamela Yates	United States
Troublemakers: The Story of Land Art		James Crump	United States
We Are Alive	On est vivants	Carmen Castillo	France, Belgium
The Witness		James Solomon	United States
Field of Vision: New Episodic Nonfiction
The Above		Kirsten Johnson	United States, Germany
Asylum (selected episodes)		Laura Poitras	United States, Germany
Birdie		Heloisa Passos	United States, Germany
God Is an Artist		Dustin Guy Defa	United States, Germany
Notes from the Border		Iva Radivojevic	United States, Germany
Peace in the Valley		Michael Palmieri and Donal Mosher	United States, Germany

=== Shorts Programs ===
The section was selected by Sarah Mankoff, Laura Kern, Matt Bolish, Florence Almozini, and Dan Sullivan. The following short films were selected:

English Title	Original Title	Director(s)	Production Country
Program 1: International
Carry On		Rafael Haider	Austria
The Mad Half Hour		Leonardo Brzezicki	Argentina, Denmark
Marea de Tierra		Manuela Martelli, Amirah Tajdin	Chile, France
Monaco		David Easteal	Australia
La novia de Frankenstein		Agostina Gálvez and Francisco Lezama	Argentina
Program 2: Genre Stories
How to Be a Villain		Helen O’Hanlon	United Kingdom
Ramona		Andrei Cretulescu	Romania
Sânge		Percival Argüero Mendoza	Mexico
Territory	Territoire	Vincent Paronnaud	France
We Wanted More		Stephen Dunn	Canada
Program 3: Animation
Denis the Pirate		Sam Messer	United States
Food		Siqi Song	United States
Hot Bod		Claire van Ryzin	United States
The Lingerie Show		Laura Harrison	United States
Palm Rot		Ryan Gillis	United States
Rolling		Matt Christensen	United States
Sanjay's Super Team		Sanjay Patel	United States
Whole		William Reynish	Denmark
Program 4: New York
Bad at Dancing		Joanna Arnow	United States
Dragstrip		Pacho Velez and Daniel Claridge	United States
Hernia		Jason Giampietro	United States
My Last Film		Zia Anger	United States
Review		Dustin Guy Defa	United States
Riot		Nathan Silver	United States
Six Cents in the Pocket		Ricky D'Ambrose	United States
Special Features		James N. Kienitz Wilkins	United States
Sundae		Sonya Goddy	United States

=== Projections ===
The section was programmed by Dennis Lim, Aily Nash, and Gavin Smith. The following films were selected:

English Title	Original Title	Director(s)	Production Country
Program 1
Analysis of Emotions and Vexations		Wojciech Bakowski	Poland
Entangled	Entrelazado	Riccardo Giacconi	Colombia, Italy
Neither God nor Santa María		Samuel M. Delgado and Helena Girón	Spain
Something Horizontal		Blake Williams	United States, Canada
Traces/Legacy		Scott Stark	United States
Program 2
brouillard – passage 15		Alexandre Larose	Canada
Cathode Garden		Janie Geiser	United States
Centre of the Cyclone		Heather Trawick	United States, Canada
The Devastated Land	Le Pays Dévasté	Emmanuel Lefrant	France
Intersection		Vincent Grenier	United States
Prima Materia		Charlotte Pryce	United States
Port Noir		Laura Kraning	United States
Something Between Us		Jodie Mack	United States
Program 3
Ah humanity!		Ernst Karel, Verena Paravel and Lucien Castaing-Taylor	Japan, France, United States
A Distant Episode		Ben Rivers	United Kingdom, Morocco
In Girum Imus Nocte		Giorgio Andreotta Calò	Italy
Half Human, Half Vapor		Mike Stoltz	United States
Occidente		Ana Vaz	France, Portugal
YOLO		Ben Russell	United States, South Africa
Program 4
Confessions (1971)		Curt McDowell	United States
The Exquisite Corpus		Peter Tscherkassky	Austria
Hard as Opal		Jared Buckhiester and Dani Leventhal	United States
Mars Garden		Lewis Klahr	United States
Non-Stop Beautiful Ladies		Alee Peoples	United States
Program 5
Lost Note (1969-2015)		Saul Levine	United States
Soft Fiction (1979)		Chick Strand	United States
Program 6
Live to Live	Vivir para Vivir	Laida Lertxundi	United States, Spain
Minotaur		Nicolás Pereda	Mexico, Canada
Program 7
Black Code	Code Noir	Louis Henderson	France
F for Fibonacci		Beatrice Gibson	United Kingdom
Hello		Simon Fujiwara	Germany
Lessons of War		Peggy Ahwesh	United States
Scales in the Spectrum of Space		Fern Silva	United States
Many Thousands Gone		Ephraim Asili	United States, Brazil
Program 8
88:88		Isiah Medina	Canada
Program 9
All That Is Solid		Louis Henderson	France, United Kingdom, Ghana
Erysichthon		Jon Rafman	Canada
Hyperlinks or It Didn’t Happen		Cécile B. Evans	United Kingdom
Mad Ladders		Michael Robinson	United States
Radio at Night		James Richards	Germany, United Kingdom
Slow Zoom Long Pause		Sara Magenheimer	United States
Program 10
Bunte Kuh		Ryan Ferko, Faraz Anoushahpour and Parastoo Anoushahpour	Canada
The Everyday Ritual of Solitude Hatching Monkeys		Basim Magdy	Egypt
Santa Teresa & Other Stories		Nelson Carlo de Los Santos Arias	Dominican Republic, Mexico, United States
Program 11
The Sky Trembles and the Earth Is Afraid and the Two Eyes Are Not Brothers		Ben Rivers	United Kingdom, Morocco
Program A
Chums from Across the Void		Jim Finn	United States
A Disaster Forever		Michael Gitlin	United States
The Two Sights		Katherin McInnis	United States
Program B
Noite Sem Distância		Lois Patiño	Portugal, Spain
Terrestrial		Calum Michel Walter	United States
Program C
All My Love All My Love		Hannah Black	United Kingdom
OM Rider		Takeshi Murata	United States
Rabbit Season, Duck Season		Michael Bell-Smith	United States
Velvet Peel 1		Victoria Fu	United States

=== Revivals ===
The following films were selected:

English Title	Original Title	Director(s)	Production Country
The Boys from Fengkuei (1983)	風櫃來的人	Hou Hsiao-hsien	Taiwan
Black Girl (1966)	La Noire de...	Ousmane Sembène	France, Senegal
Blow Out (1981)		Brian De Palma	United States
Heaven Can Wait (1943)		Ernst Lubitsch	United States
Insiang (1976)		Lino Brocka	Philippines
The Long Voyage Home (1940)		John Ford	United States
The Memory of Justice (1976)	The Memory of Justice	Marcel Ophüls	France, West Germany, United Kingdom, United States
Ran (1985)	乱	Akira Kurosawa	Japan
Rocco and His Brothers (1960)	Rocco e i suoi fratelli	Luchino Visconti	Italy, France
A Touch of Zen (1970)	俠女	King Hu	Taiwan, Hong Kong
Visit or Memories and Confessions (2015)	Visita ou Memórias e Confissões	Manoel de Oliveira	Portugal

=== Retrospective ===
The retrospective was programmed by Gavin Smith.

==== Nathaniel Dorsky ====
Title	Director(s)	Production Country
Early Sounds/Middle Silence
A Fall Trip Home (1964)	Nathaniel Dorsky	United States
Ingreen (1964)	Nathaniel Dorsky	United States
Kodachrome Dailies from the Time of Song and Solitude (Reel 1) (2005-2006)	Nathaniel Dorsky	United States
Summerwind (1965)	Nathaniel Dorsky	United States
Hours and More for Jerome
Hours for Jerome part 1 (1966-1982)	Nathaniel Dorsky	United States
Hours for Jerome part 2 (1966-1982)	Nathaniel Dorsky	United States
Two Personal Gifts aka Fool’s Spring (1966-1967)	Jerome Hiler and Nathaniel Dorsky	United States
Excavations
17 Reasons Why (1985-1987)	Nathaniel Dorsky	United States
Alaya (1976-1987)	Nathaniel Dorsky	United States
Pneuma (1977-1983)	Nathaniel Dorsky	United States
Three Cinematic Songs
Arbor Vitae (1999-2000)	Nathaniel Dorsky	United States
Song and Solitude (2005-2006)	Nathaniel Dorsky	United States
Threnody (2004)	Nathaniel Dorsky	United States
Triste (1974-1996)	Nathaniel Dorsky	United States
Variations (1992-1998)	Nathaniel Dorsky	United States
The Visitation (2002)	Nathaniel Dorsky	United States
The Quartet
Aubade (2010)	Nathaniel Dorsky	United States
Compline (2009)	Nathaniel Dorsky	United States
Sarabande (2008)	Nathaniel Dorsky	United States
Winter (2007)	Nathaniel Dorsky	United States
New Beginnings
August and After (2012)	Nathaniel Dorsky	United States
Pastourelle (2010)	Nathaniel Dorsky	United States
The Return (2011)	Nathaniel Dorsky	United States
Worlds Emerging
April (2012)	Nathaniel Dorsky	United States
Song (2013)	Nathaniel Dorsky	United States
Spring (2013)	Nathaniel Dorsky	United States
The Late Quartet
Avraham (2014)	Nathaniel Dorsky	United States
December (2014)	Nathaniel Dorsky	United States
February (2014)	Nathaniel Dorsky	United States
Summer (2013)	Nathaniel Dorsky	United States
Contemplations
Intimations (2015)	Nathaniel Dorsky	United States
Love's Refrain (2000-2001)	Nathaniel Dorsky	United States
Prelude (2015)	Nathaniel Dorsky	United States

==== Jerome Hiler ====
Title	Director	Production Country
Passing Glances
In the Stone House (1967-1970/2012)	Jerome Hiler	United States
New Shores (1970-1990/2012)	Jerome Hiler	United States
Inhabited Places
Gladly Given (1997)	Jerome Hiler	United States
Marginalia (2015)	Jerome Hiler	United States
Words of Mercury (2011)	Jerome Hiler	United States
