= 2016 New York Film Festival =

54th edition

- Opening film: 13th
- Closing film: The Lost City of Z
- Location: New York City, United States
- Founded: 1963
- Founded by: Richard Roud and Amos Vogel
- Hosted by: Film at Lincoln Center
- Artistic director: Kent Jones
- Festival date: September 30 – October 16, 2016
- Website: https://www.filmlinc.org/nyff/

New York Film Festival
- 2017 2015

The 54th New York Film Festival took place from September 30 to October 16, 2016, in New York City, presented by Film at Lincoln Center.

The festival's opening film was Ava DuVernay's 13th. Mike Mills' 20th Century Women was the festival's centerpiece. James Gray's The Lost City of Z was the festival's closing film.

The "Explorations" section was a new addition for the 2016 program.

Appearing in the NYFF's "Main Slate" for the first time were: Ava DuVernay, Mike Mills, Kleber Mendonça Filho, Gianfranco Rosi, Barry Jenkins, Dash Shaw, and Maren Ade.

World premieres included: Alex Horwitz's Hamilton's America, Ang Lee's Billy Lynn's Long Halftime Walk, Ava DuVernay's 13th, James Gray's The Lost City of Z, and Lonny Price's Best Worst Thing That Ever Could Have Happened.

== Official Selections ==
The primary selection committee included Kent Jones (chair), Dennis Lim, Florence Almozini, Amy Taubin, and Gavin Smith as a consultant.

=== Main Slate ===
The following films were selected for the Main Slate section:

English Title	Original Title	Director(s)	Production Country
13th (opening film)		Ava DuVernay	United States
20th Century Women (centerpiece)		Mike Mills	United States
Aquarius		Kleber Mendonça Filho	Brazil, France
Certain Women		Kelly Reichardt	United States
Elle		Paul Verhoeven	France, Germany
Fire at Sea	Fuocoammare	Gianfranco Rosi	Italy, France
Graduation	Bacalaureat	Cristian Mungiu	Romania, France
Hermia & Helena		Matías Piñeiro	Argentina, United States
I, Daniel Blake		Ken Loach	United Kingdom, France
Julieta		Pedro Almodóvar	Spain
The Lost City of Z (closing film)		James Gray	United States
Manchester by the Sea		Kenneth Lonergan	United States
Moonlight		Barry Jenkins	United States
My Entire High School Sinking into the Sea		Dash Shaw	United States
Neruda		Pablo Larraín	Chile, Argentina, France, Spain
Paterson		Jim Jarmusch	United States
Personal Shopper		Olivier Assayas	France
The Rehearsal		Alison Maclean	New Zealand
Sieranevada		Cristi Puiu	Romania
The Son of Joseph	Le Fils de Joseph	Eugène Green	France, Belgium
Staying Vertical	Rester Vertical	Alain Guiraudie	France
Things to Come	L'Avenir	Mia Hansen-Løve	France, Germany
Toni Erdmann		Maren Ade	Germany, Austria
The Unknown Girl	La fille inconnue	Jean-Pierre and Luc Dardenne	Belgium, France
Yourself and Yours	당신자신과 당신의 것	Hong Sang-soo	South Korea

=== Special Events ===
The following films were selected:

Title	Director	Production Country
Best Worst Thing That Ever Could Have Happened	Lonny Price	United States
Billy Lynn's Long Halftime Walk	Ang Lee	United States, United Kingdom, China
Gimme Danger	Jim Jarmusch	United States
Hamilton's America	Alex Horwitz	United States
Jackie	Pablo Larraín	United States, Chile, France
A Quiet Passion	Terence Davies	United Kingdom

=== Spotlight on Documentary ===
The following documentaries were selected:

English Title	Original Title	Director(s)	Production Country
Abacus: Small Enough to Jail		Steve James	United States
The B-Side: Elsa Dorfman's Portrait Photography		Errol Morris	United States
Bright Lights: Starring Carrie Fisher and Debbie Reynolds		Alexis Bloom and Fisher Stevens	United States
The Cinema Travellers		Shirley Abraham and Amit Madheshiya	India
Dawson City: Frozen Time		Bill Morrison	United States
Hissane Habré: A Chadian Tragedy	Hissein Habré, une tragédie tchadienne	Mahamat-Saleh Haroun	France, Chad
I Am Not Your Negro		Raoul Peck	United States, France, Belgium, Switzerland
I Called Him Morgan		Kasper Collin	Sweden, United States
Karl Marx City		Petra Epperlein and Michael Tucker	Germany
Patria O Muerte: Cuba, Fatherland or Death		Olatz López Garmendia	United States
Restless Creature: Wendy Whelan		Linda Saffire and Adam Schlesinger	United States
The Settlers		Shimon Dotan	France, Canada, Israel
Two Trains Runnin’		Sam Pollard	United States
Uncle Howard		Aaron Brookner	United Kingdom, United States
Whose Country?	Balad Meen?	Mohamed Siam	Egypt, United States, France

=== Explorations ===
The following films were selected:

English Title	Original Title	Director(s)	Production Country
The Death of Louis XIV	La Mort de Louis XIV	Albert Serra	France, Portugal, Spain
Everything Else	Todo lo demás	Natalia Almada	Mexico
I Had Nowhere to Go		Douglas Gordon	United Kingdom, Germany
Kékszakállú		Gastón Solnicki	Argentina
Mimosas		Oliver Laxe	Spain, Morocco, France, Qatar
The Ornithologist	O Ornitólogo	João Pedro Rodrigues	Portugal, France, Brazil

=== Shorts ===
The Shorts Programs were selected by Dilcia Barrera, Laura Kern, Dennis Lim, Gabi Madsen and Dan Sullivan. The following short films were selected:

English Title	Original Title	Director(s)	Production Country
Program 1: Narrative
And The Whole Sky Fit In The Dead Cow’s Eye	Y todo el celo cupo en el ojo de la vaca muerta	Francisca Alegria	Chile, United States
Be Good for Rachel		Ed Roe	United States
Dobro		Marta Hernaiz Pidal	Bosnia and Herzegovina, Mexico
The Girl Who Danced with the Devil	A moça que dançou com o Diabo	João Paulo Miranda Maria	Brazil
Land of the Lost Sidekicks		Roger Ross Williams	United States
Little Bullets	Küçük Kurşunlar	Alphan Eseli	Turkey
Univitellin		Terence Nance	France
Program 2: International Auteurs
A Brief History of Princess X		Gabriel Abrantes	Portugal, France
Sarah Winchester, Phantom Opera	Sarah Winchester, Opera Fantôme	Bertrand Bonello	France
The Hedonists	营生	Jia Zhangke	China
From the Diary of a Wedding Photographer	מיומנו של צלם חתונות	Nadav Lapid	Israel
Program 3: Genre Stories
Can’t Take My Eyes Off You		Johannes Kizler, Nik Sentenza	Germany
Imposter		Adam Goldhammer	Canada
New Gods		Jack Burke	United Kingdom
Quenottes (Pearlies)		Pascal Thiebaux, Gil Pinheiro	Luxembourg, France
The Signalman		Daniel Augusto	Brazil
What Happened to Her		Kristy Guevara-Flanagan	United States
Program 4: New York Stories
Dramatic Relationships		Dustin Guy Defa	United States
The Honeymoon		Tommy Davis	United States
I Turn to Jello		Andrew T. Betzer	United States
Kitty		Chloë Sevigny	United States
Los Angeles Plays New York		John Wilson	United States
This Castle Keep		Gina Telaroli	United States
Program 5: Documentaries
Legal Smuggling with Christine Choy		Lewie Kloster	United States
El Buzo		Esteban Arrangoiz	Mexico
Jean Nouvel: Reflections		Matt Tyrnauer	United States
Rotatio		Ian McClerin	United States
The Vote		Mila Aung-Thwin, Van Royko	Canada
Brillo Box (3¢ off)		Lisanne Skyler	United States

=== Projections ===
Projections was programmed by Dennis Lim and Aily Nash. The following films were selected:

English Title	Original Title	Director(s)	Production Country
Program 1: The Spaces Between the Words
Now: End of Season		Ayman Nahle	Lebanon
Real Italian Pizza (1971)		David Rimmer	Canada
REGAL		Karissa Hahn	United States
See a Dog, Hear a Dog		Jesse McLean	United States
Steve Hates Fish		John Smith	United Kingdom
Twixt Cup and Lip		Stephen Sutcliffe	United Kingdom
Program 2: Beyond Landscape
Bad Mama, Who Cares		Brigid McCaffrey	United States
Bending to Earth		Rosa Barba	United States, Germany
Burning Mountains That Spew Flame	Montañas Ardientes Que Vomitan Fuego	Helena Girón and Samuel Delgado	Spain
Canadian Pacific I (1974)		David Rimmer	Canada
Ears, Nose and Throat		Kevin Jerome Everson	United States
Jáaji Approx.		Sky Hopinka	United States
Ten Mornings Ten Evening and One Horizon		Tomonari Nishikawa	Japan
Program 3: The Illinois Parables
The Illinois Parables		Deborah Stratman	United States
The Horses of a Cavalry Captain	Die Pferde des Rittmeisters	Clemens von Wedemeyer	Germany
Program 4: Fade Out
Answer Print		Mónica Savirón	United States
Athyrium filix-femina (for Anna Atkins)		Kelly Egan	Canada
Cilaos		Camilo Restrepo	France
Flowers of the Sky		Janie Geiser	United States
Ghost Children		João Vieira Torres	Brazil, France
Luna e Santur		Joshua Gen Solondz	United States
Old Hat		Zach Iannazzi	United States
Variations on a Cellophane Wrapper (1970)		David Rimmer	Canada
Program 5: Site and Sound
Europa, Mon Amour (2016 Brexit Edition)		Lawrence Lek	United Kingdom
Foyer		Ismaïl Bahri	France, Tunisia
Indefinite Pitch		James N. Kienitz Wilkins	United States
Strange Vision of Seeing Things		Ryan Ferko	Canada, Serbia
Program 6
All the Cities of the North		Dane Komljen	Serbia, Bosnia-Herzegovina, Montenegro
Program 7: Pop Culture Clash
A Boy Needs a Friend		Steve Reinke	United States
Dream English Kid, 1964–1999 AD		Mark Leckey	United Kingdom
Spotlight on a Brick Wall		Alee Peoples and Mike Stoltz	United States
Return to Forms		Zachary Epcar	United States
Program 8: Dorsky and Hiler
Autumn		Nathaniel Dorsky	United States
Bagatelle II		Jerome Hiler	United States
The Dreamer		Nathaniel Dorsky	United States
Program 9: Event Horizons
An Aviation Field	Um Campo de Aviação	Joana Pimenta	Portugal, United States, Brazil
Electrical Gaza		Rosalind Nashashibi	United States
Event Horizon		Guillermo Moncayo	France
Há Terra!		Ana Vaz	Brazil, France
In Titan's Goblet (1991)		Peter Hutton	United States
Kindah		Ephraim Asili	United States, Jamaica
Program 10: From the Notebook of...
From the Notebook of... (1971-1998)		Robert Beavers	Italy, Switzerland
For Christian		Luke Fowler	United Kingdom, United States
Program 11
The Human Surge	El auge del humano	Eduardo Williams	Argentina, Brazil, Portugal

=== Revivals ===
The Revivals section was programmed by Kent Jones. The following films were selected:

English title	Original title	Director(s)	Production Country
L'Argent (1983)		Robert Bresson	France
At the Four Corners (1949) (short)	Aux quatre coins	Jacques Rivette	France
The Battle of Algiers (1966)	La battaglia di Algeri	Gillo Pontecorvo	Italy, Algeria
The Diversion (1952) (short)	Le divertissement	Jacques Rivette	France
Harlan County, USA (1976)		Barbara Kopple	United States
The Living Idol (1957)		Albert Lewin	United States
Memories of Underdevelopment (1968)	Memorias del subdesarrollo	Tomás Gutiérrez Alea	Cuba
One-Eyed Jacks (1961)		Marlon Brando	United States
Panic (1946)	Panique	Julien Duvivier	France
The Quadrille (1950) (short)	Le quadrille	Jacques Rivette	France
Taipei Story (1985)	青梅竹馬	Edward Yang	Taiwan
Ugetsu (1953)	雨月物語	Kenji Mizoguchi	Japan

=== Retrospective ===
The 2016 Retrospective contained two programs, both inspired by Bertrand Tavernier. “A Brief Journey Through French Cinema” screened Tavernier’s My Journey Through French Cinema along with several titles cited in the film. The second program focused on Henry Hathaway, a director Tavernier particularly admires.

The following films were selected:

English title	Original title	Director(s)	Production Country
A Brief Journey Through French Cinema
Angels of Sin (1943)	Les anges du péché	Robert Bresson	France
Antoine and Antoinette (1947)	Antoine et Antoinette	Jacques Becker	France
Deadlier Than the Male (1956)	Voici le temps des assassins	Julien Duvivier	France
Les Enfants terribles (1950)		Jean-Pierre Melville	France
La Marseillaise (1938)		Jean Renoir	France
My Journey Through French Cinema (2016)	Voyage à travers le cinéma français	Bertrand Tavernier	France
Safe Conduct (2002)	Laissez-passer	Bertrand Tavernier	France
Henry Hathaway
23 Paces to Baker Street (1956)		Henry Hathaway	United States
The Dark Corner (1946)		Henry Hathaway	United States
Down to the Sea in Ships (1949)		Henry Hathaway	United States
Fourteen Hours (1951)		Henry Hathaway	United States
From Hell to Texas (1958)		Henry Hathaway	United States
Garden of Evil (1958)		Henry Hathaway	United States, Mexico
Kiss of Death (1947)		Henry Hathaway	United States
Niagara (1953)		Henry Hathaway	United States
North to Alaska (1960)		Henry Hathaway	United States
Rawhide (1951)		Henry Hathaway	United States
The Shepherd of the Hills (1941)		Henry Hathaway	United States
Spawn of the North (1938)		Henry Hathaway	United States
