= 17 Reasons Why =

- A screenshot from the film
- Directed by: Nathaniel Dorsky
- Distributed by: Canyon Cinema
- Release date: October 6, 1987
- Running time: 19 minutes
- Country: United States
- Language: Silent

17 Reasons Why is a 1987 American avant-garde short film directed by Nathaniel Dorsky. Working with a collection of secondhand portable cameras, Dorsky used the unslit 8 mm footage to create a split screen with four quadrants. Normally screened on 16 mm film at 16 frames per second, it is one of Dorsky's few works to have been shown as a digital transfer.

== Description ==
17 Reasons Why is divided into twenty segments, each around one minute long. The content of these segments varies between landscapes, interior scenes, faces, extreme close-ups of objects, and color fields. These are sometimes combined through multiple exposures.

The film divides the screen into four quadrants. The top and bottom images are offset by a single frame. The left and right sides usually use different shots but sometimes show the same image out of sync.

== Production ==
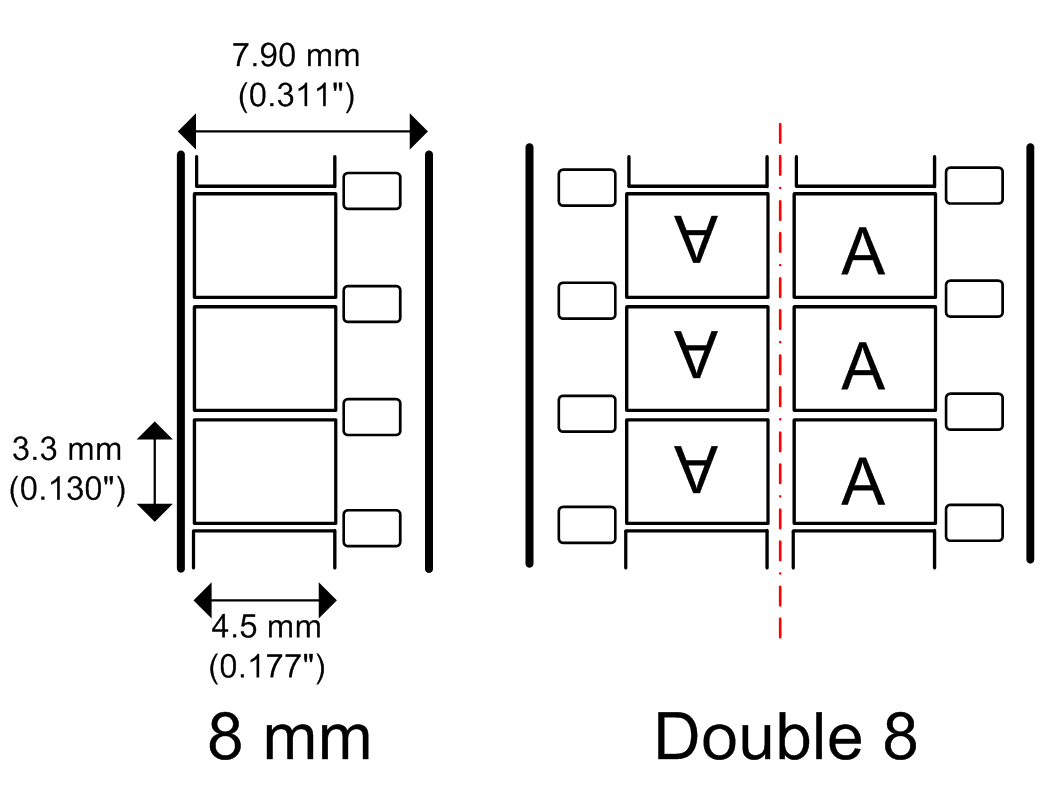
Double 8 mm film is made by shooting along each side of a 16 mm film strip and splitting it in half during development. Dorsky used unslit Double 8 to create a 16 mm film with four images per frame.

The split screen in 17 Reasons Why was produced through Double 8, a technique common within experimental cinema during the 1970s. Double 8 mm film uses a single film strip that is 16 mm wide. Only half the width is exposed at any given time, and the camera operator flips the roll once one side is complete. When the roll is developed, the strip is slit along the center to separate it into two 8 mm strips. To create the quadrisected image, Dorsky created a 16 mm strip from printing the unslit 8 mm strips, such that each 16 mm frame contains four smaller 8 mm frames.

Dorsky made the film using old 8 mm cameras he purchased secondhand. To prevent the two sides of the strip from facing different directions, he held the camera upside down when shooting the second side of each roll. His use of multiple cameras and film stocks produced different colors, textures, and gate shapes in the resulting footage. He spliced together twenty rolls of film. Each segment would normally contain around four minutes of footage, but the use of unslit film shortened that to less than one minute, giving the final work a fast tempo unusual in Dorsky's work.

The title 17 Reasons Why comes from a rooftop sign at 17th and Mission Street which appears in the film.

== Release ==
The film premiered on October 6, 1987, at the Berkeley Art Museum and Pacific Film Archive, in a program with Pneuma and Alaya. It screened on October 20 at the Collective for Living Cinema in New York. Dorsky requests the film be projected at 16 frames per second, slightly slower than the 18 fps frame rate of his other films or the 24 fps frame rate of typical sound films, to emphasize the articulation of individual frames.

17 Reasons Why is one of few films by Dorsky to have been presented digitally. A 2019 exhibition at the Museum of Modern Art, Private Lives Public Spaces, featured 100 works of "artist's cinema, amateur movies, and family filmmaking". 17 Reasons Why was presented on a digital screen in front of a dark background at the exhibition's entrance, in addition to two 16 mm screenings. MoMA had wanted to show the film as a 16 mm loop, but the wear and tear would have destroyed the print. Dorsky was concerned that rendering the film at 16 frames per second would require the insertion of duplicate frames, which would interfere with its single-frame effects. Upon seeing the installation of the digital version, Dorsky remarked that it "has less feeling of body and light, delicacy of color, and tenderness of fragile beauty" than the film version but that he was "very pleasantly surprised with how good the MoMA technicians made the film look in its own newly acquired digital terms."

== Reception ==
Critic Amy Taubin described the film as "lively, glittering, and mysterious", writing that it "has the surprise and resonance of accomplished ensemble jazz improvisation."

== Bibliography ==
- MacDonald, Scott (2006). A Critical Cinema 5: Interviews with Independent Filmmakers. University of California Press. ISBN 978-0-520-93908-0.
- Marín, Pablo (2023). "Sunset Sucks: Some Reasons for the Beauty of 17 Reasons Why". In Algarín Navarro, Francisco; Saldaña, Carlos (eds.). Illuminated Hours: The Early Cinema of Nathaniel Dorsky and Jerome Hiler. Asociación Lumière. ISBN 978-8-4940-9766-9.
- Sicinski, Michael (2010). "The Bay Area as Cinematic Space in Twenty-five Stops or Less". In Anker, Steve; Geritz, Kathy; Seid, Steve (eds.). Radical Light: Alternative Film and Video in the San Francisco Bay Area, 1945–2000. University of California Press. ISBN 978-0-520-24911-0.
