= 16th AARP Movies for Grownups Awards =

Film award ceremony

- Announced on: December 14, 2016
- Presented on: February 6, 2017
- Site: Beverly Wilshire Hotel
- Hosted by: Margo Martindale

Highlights
- Most awards: Fences, Manhchester by the Sea, 20th Century Women (2)
- Most nominations: Fences (9)

The 16th AARP Movies for Grownups Awards, presented by AARP the Magazine, honored films released in 2016. Nominations were announced on December 14, 2016. The awards recognized films created by and about people over the age of 50. Winners were announced on January 4, 2017. The awards ceremony was hosted on February 16, 2017 by actress Margo Martindale at the Beverly Wilshire Hotel. This was the last year that the awards were not broadcast on television. This was the final year an award was given for Best Comedy or for Best Movie for Grownups Who Refuse to Grow Up.

== Awards ==
=== Winners and Nominees ===
Winners are listed first, highlighted in boldface, and indicated with a double dagger (‡).

**Best Movie for Grownups**: **Loving**‡; La La Land; Lion; Manchester by the Sea; Silence; Sully	**Best Director**: **Kenneth Lonergan – Manchester by the Sea**‡; Clint Eastwood - Sully; David Mackenzie - Hell or High Water; Martin Scorsese - Silence; Denzel Washington - Fences
**Best Actor**: **Denzel Washington - Fences**‡; Warren Beatty - Rules Don't Apply; Tom Hanks - Sully; Michael Keaton - The Founder; Viggo Mortensen - Captain Fantastic	**Best Actress**: **Annette Bening - 20th Century Women**‡; Sally Field - Hello, My Name Is Doris; Isabelle Huppert - Elle; Meryl Streep - Florence Foster Jenkins; Tilda Swinton - A Bigger Splash
**Best Supporting Actor**: **Jeff Bridges - Hell or High Water**‡; Kevin Costner - Hidden Figures; Stephen McKinley Henderson - Fences; Issey Ogata - Silence; Timothy Spall - Denial	**Best Supporting Actress**: **Viola Davis - Fences**‡; Nicole Kidman - Lion; Helen Mirren - Eye in the Sky; Molly Shannon - Other People; Sigourney Weaver - A Monster Calls
**Best Comedy/Musical**: **La La Land**‡; Absolutely Fabulous: The Movie; Florence Foster Jenkins; Hello, My Name Is Doris; My Big Fat Greek Wedding 2	**Best Screenwriter**: **Kenneth Lonergan - Manchester by the Sea**‡; Pedro Almodovar - Julieta; Jay Cocks, Martin Scorsese - Silence; J.K. Rowling - Fantastic Beasts and Where to Find Them; August Wilson - Fences
**Best Time Capsule**: **Jackie**‡; Hidden Figures; Loving; Rules Don't Apply; The Founder	**Best Intergenerational Film**: **20th Century Women**‡; A Monster Calls; Fences; Lion; The Hollars
**Best Grownup Love Story**: **Margo Martindale and Richard Jenkins - The Hollars**‡; Denzel Washington and Viola Davis - Fences; Meryl Streep and Hugh Grant - Florence Foster Jenkins; Michael Constantine and Lainie Kazan - My Big Fat Greek Wedding 2; Susan Sarandon and J.K. Simmons - The Meddler	**Best Buddy Picture**: **Jennifer Saunders and Joanna Lumley - Absolutely Fabulous: The Movie**‡; Stephen McKinley Henderson and Denzel Washington - Fences; Jude Law and Colin Firth - Genius; John Carroll Lynch and Nick Offerman - The Founder; Russell Crowe and Ryan Gosling - The Nice Guys
**Best Movie for Grownups Who Refuse to Grow Up**: **Kubo and the Two Strings**‡; Moana; Sing; The Jungle Book; Zootopia	**Best Documentary**: **The Beatles: Eight Days a Week**‡; Big Sonia; Everything is Copy; Maya Angelou: And Still I Rise; Tower
**Best Foreign Film**: **Elle - France**‡; A Man Called Ove - Sweden; Aquarius - Brazil; Our Last Tango - Argentina; The People vs. Fritz Bauer - Germany	**Readers' Choice Poll**: **Sully**‡; Arrival; Fences; Hello, My Name Is Doris; Jackie; La La Land; Lion; Loving; Manchester by the Sea; Silence

=== Career Achievement Award ===
- Morgan Freeman: "Whether he's portraying the president of the United States, a paternal prison inmate, or God himself, Freeman brings instinctive authority to every role thanks to his distinguished demeanor and rolling voice."

=== Films with multiple nominations and awards ===
Films that received multiple nominations
Nominations	Film
9	Fences
5	Silence
4	Lion
4	Manchester by the Sea
4	Sully
3	Florence Foster Jenkins
3	The Founder
3	Hello, My Name Is Doris
3	La La Land
3	Loving
2	Absolutely Fabulous: The Movie
2	Elle
2	Hell or High Water
2	Hidden Figures
2	The Hollars
2	Jackie
2	A Monster Calls
2	My Big Fat Greek Wedding 2
2	Rules Don't Apply
2	20th Century Women

Films that received multiple awards
Wins	Film
2	Fences
2	Manchester by the Sea
2	20th Century Women
