= Nathaniel Dorsky =

American filmmaker (born 1943)

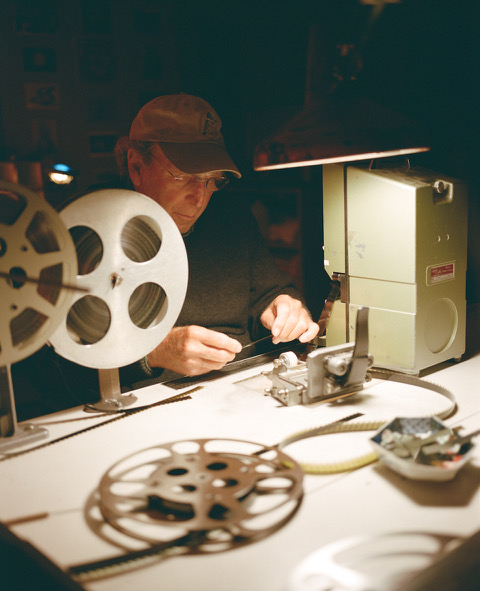
Nathaniel Dorsky on his editing table

Nathaniel Dorsky (born 1943) is an American experimental filmmaker and film editor. His film career began during the New American Cinema movement of the 1960s, when he met his partner Jerome Hiler. He won an Emmy Award in 1967 for his work on the film Gauguin in Tahiti: Search for Paradise.

After moving to San Francisco in the 1970s, Dorsky eventually edited some of his earlier footage to create the 1982 film Hours for Jerome, which was inducted into the United States National Film Registry. Through his short lyric films, he developed the style of polyvalent montage for which he is known. In addition to his own films, Dorsky has worked as an editor or film doctor on other projects, particularly documentaries.

== Early life ==
Dorsky was born in New York City in 1943 and grew up in Millburn, New Jersey. Growing up, Dorsky learned about Buddhism through attending study groups with his father. He made 8 mm nature films inspired by Disney's True-Life Adventures series.

Dorsky attended Antioch College for a year, and through a work-study program he edited sound at WNYC at KPFA. He moved to New York City to study film at NYU.

== Career ==
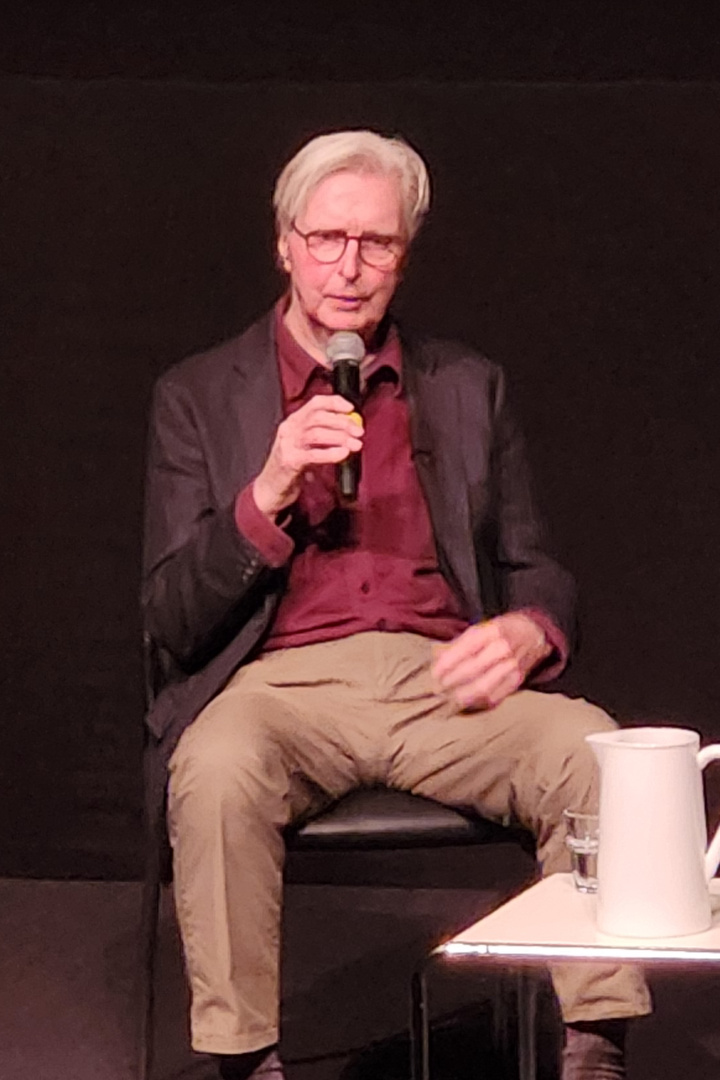
Dorsky's partner Jerome Hiler in 2023

In New York, Dorsky was exposed to the local experimental film scene and made a trilogy of films about his childhood. Shortly after premiering the first film of the trilogy, Ingreen, he met Jerome Hiler at the Film-Makers' Cooperative.

Dorsky and Hiler became romantic partners and moved to rural Lake Owassa, New Jersey in 1966. He won an Emmy Award for the film Gauguin in Tahiti: Search for Paradise which was directed by Martin Carr in 1967. Ralph Steiner hired Dorsky to edit three of his final films: A Look at Laundry, Beyond Niagara, and Look Park.

Dorsky continued shooting footage during his time in New Jersey but stopped editing and releasing films for many years. After Hiler made an untitled film as a birthday gift, he made one in response, and the two pieces are now known as Fool's Spring (Two Personal Gifts). Both were projectionists and programmers at the local branch of the Sussex County Area Reference Library, which commissioned them to make an industrial film. The resulting piece Library features a minimalist soundtrack by Tony Conrad and narration by Beverly Grant.

Dorsky and Hiler stayed in New Jersey until 1971 when they moved to San Francisco. After going to Los Angeles to work on the exploitation film Revenge of the Cheerleaders, Dorsky settled in San Francisco permanently. He served for several years on the board of the San Francisco Cinematheque.

In the early 1980s, he edited his films from living at Lake Owassa to make Hours for Jerome, a two-part film structured around the seasons. He experimented with silent speed in making the film, and since then he has made silent films which are screened at a reduced frame rate. Hours for Jerome was inducted into the National Film Registry in 2012.

Dorsky's other short films from the 1980s concentrated on the film grain, texture, and color. Pneuma captures the grain patterns of expired, unexposed rolls of film, and he used footage of grains of sand to create Alaya. Ariel, like Pneuma, was made without the use of a camera. 17 Reasons Why is composed of unslit 8 mm footage, resulting in a four-image arrangement.

Dorsky co-directed the 1986 documentary What Happened to Kerouac? with Richard Lerner, director of Revenge of the Cheerleaders. Lerner brought him onto the project to shoot footage that would accompany tapes of Jack Kerouac reading his own poems. Dorsky has since continued working as a film doctor, particularly for documentary films supported by the Film Arts Foundation in San Francisco.

Dorsky's next film was Triste, assembled from footage shot over the course of many years and released in 1996. It established his practice of polyvalent montage, marking what he called "the level of cinema language that I have been working towards." He continued to develop this style of editing in his later works. In 2003 Dorsky published the short book Devotional Cinema, in which he discusses the experience of watching film and explores the link between art and health.

Kodachrome, the color reversal film stock preferred by Dorsky since childhood, was discontinued in the late 2000s. His films Sarabande and Compline were made as explorations of the stock's properties. As he shifted to color negative film in the 2010s, Dorsky adjusted to working with the new stocks by incorporating in-camera improvisations, moving away from his earlier style of polyvalent montage. The 2015 New York Film Festival honored his work with a thirty four film complete retrospective at Lincoln Center. Manohla Dargis of the New York Times listed this retrospective in second place in her list of the top ten films of 2015. Dorsky shot a series of seven films at the San Francisco Botanical Garden in 2017. These comprise the Arboretum Cycle, which captures the natural light propagating through plants at the arboretum over the course of a year.

Dorsky was a visiting instructor at Princeton University in 2008 and he has been the recipient of many awards including a Guggenheim Fellowship 1997 and grants from the National Endowment of the Arts, two from the Rockefeller Foundation, and one from the LEF Foundation, the Foundation for Contemporary Arts, and the California Arts Council. He has presented films at the Museum of Modern Art, the Centre Pompidou, the Tate Modern, the Filmoteca Española, Madrid, the Prague Film Archive, the Vienna Film Museum, the Pacific Film Archive, the Harvard Film Archive, Princeton University, Yale University, and frequently exhibits new work at the New York Film Festival's Views from the Avant-Garde and the Wavelengths program of the Toronto International Film Festival. In spring 2012 Dorsky took actively part in the three-month exposition of Whitney Biennial.

Dorsky's films are available only as 16 mm film prints and are distributed by Canyon Cinema in San Francisco and Light Cone in Paris. Prints of stills from his films are available at the Gallery Paule Anglim, San Francisco, and the Peter Blum Gallery, New York City.

== Style ==
Most of Dorsky's films are silent works roughly 20 minutes long. They are projected at 18 frames per second, much lower than the 24 frames per second used for sound films. The reduced frame rate introduces a slight flickering effect that makes the images more abstract. He works with a 16 mm spring-wound Bolex camera, which limits the length of his shots to no more than thirty seconds.

Dorsky is known for working in a form of montage described as "polyvalent" or "open-form". Critic P. Adams Sitney characterizes this form as a series of static shots that act as individual, monadic units, arranged together in a basic shot-cut-shot construction. Unlike in narrative cinema, recurring images are atypical, and the procession of images does not quickly converge on a fixed subject or theme. Instead, new monadic images are continually introduced, suppressing anticipation of the future and remaining in the present moment. Dorsky establishes subtle connections between images based on elements like colors, patterns, or iconography. These interconnections may link a shot back to earlier shots in the montage, beyond the cuts that connect them. In this way, he establishes motifs gradually over the course of a film, in a montage that "opens up yet accumulates."

Dorsky's compositions avoid over-determined images that rely on established symbols or meanings so that the audience constructs meanings while viewing. Common subjects of his include foliage, bodies of water, reflective or clear surfaces, and passersby. Since shifting away from polyvalent montage in the 2010s, Dorsky has reintroduced in-camera improvisations into his subsequent films. These techniques include changes in focus to create shifts within individual shots, as well as oscillations in aperture that create fluctuations in light intensity similar to a musical vibrato.

Dorsky's work has been an influence on filmmakers including Timoleon Wilkins and Konrad Steiner.

== Filmography ==
- Ingreen (1964)
- A Fall Trip Home (1964)
- Summerwind (1965)
- Two Personal Gifts (AKA Fool's Spring) (1966–67) (with Jerome Hiler)
- Library (1970) (with Jerome Hiler)
- Hours for Jerome Part 1&2 (1966–70/82)
- Pneuma (1977–83)
- Ariel (1983)
- Alaya (1976–87)
- 17 Reasons Why (1985–87)
- Triste (1974–96)
- Variations (1992–98)
- Arbor Vitae (1999–00)
- Love's Refrain (2000–01)
- The Visitation (2002)
- Threnody (2004)
- Song and Solitude (2005–06)
- Kodachrome Dailies from the Time of Song and Solitude (Reel 1) (2005–2006)
- Kodachrome Dailies from the Time of Song and Solitude (Reel 2) (2005–2006)
- Winter (2007)
- Sarabande (2008)
- Compline (2009)
- Aubade (2010)
- Pastourelle (2010)
- The Return (2011)
- August and After (2012)
- April (2012)
- Song (2013)
- Spring (2013)
- Summer (2013)
- December (2014)
- February (2014)
- Avraham (2014)
- Intimations (2015)
- Prelude (2015)
- Autumn (2016)
- The Dreamer (2016)
- Lux Perpetua I (2000–2002/2016)
- Lux Perpetua II (1999–2002/2016)
- Other Archer (2003/2016)
- Death of a Poet (2003/2016)
- Ossuary (1995–2005/2016)
- Arboretum Cycle (2017, 137 min.) comprising the following films:
1. Elohim (2017)
2. Abaton (2017)
3. Coda (2017)
4. Ode (2017)
5. September (2017)
6. Monody (2017)
7. Epilogue (2017)
- Colophon (for the Arboretum Cycle) (2018)
- Calyx (2018)
- Apricity (2019)
- Interlude (2019)
- Canticles (2019)
- Caracole (for Cecilia) (2019)
- Lamentations (2020)
- Temple Sleep (2020)
- William (2020)
- Emanations (2020)
- Ember Days (2021)
- Terce (2021)
- Interval (2021)
- Caracole (for Mac) (2022)
- Naos (2022)
- Dialogues (2022)
- Place d'Or (2023)
- Pavane (2023)
- Caracole (for Izcali) (2023)
- O Death (2023)
- Dreams Reveal a Weightless World (2016–2024)
- Silent Speed (2026)

== Sources ==
- Algarín Navarro, Francisco; Saldaña, Carlos, eds. (2023). Illuminated Hours: The Early Cinema of Nathaniel Dorsky and Jerome Hiler. Asociación Lumière. ISBN 978-8-4940-9766-9.
- Anker, Steve; Geritz, Kathy; Seid, Steve, eds. (2010). Radical Light: Alternative Film and Video in the San Francisco Bay Area, 1945–2000. University of California Press. ISBN 978-0-520-24911-0.
- Brooks, Tim; Marsh, Earle F. (2009). The Complete Directory to Prime Time Network and Cable TV Shows, 1946-Present. Random House Publishing Group. ISBN 978-0-307-48320-1.
- MacDonald, Scott (1995). "Ralph Steiner". In Horak, Jan-Christopher (ed.). Lovers of Cinema: The First American Film Avant-garde, 1919–1945. University of Wisconsin Press. ISBN 978-0-299-14684-9.
- MacDonald, Scott (2006). A Critical Cinema 5: Interviews with Independent Filmmakers. University of California Press.
