= Variations (film) =

- Directed by: Nathaniel Dorsky
- Distributed by: Canyon Cinema
- Release date: 1998
- Running time: 24 minutes
- Country: United States
- Language: Silent

Variations is a 1998 American silent short avant-garde film directed by Nathaniel Dorsky. It is the second film in a set of "Four Cinematic Songs", which also includes Triste, Arbor Vitae, and Love's Refrain.

== Production ==
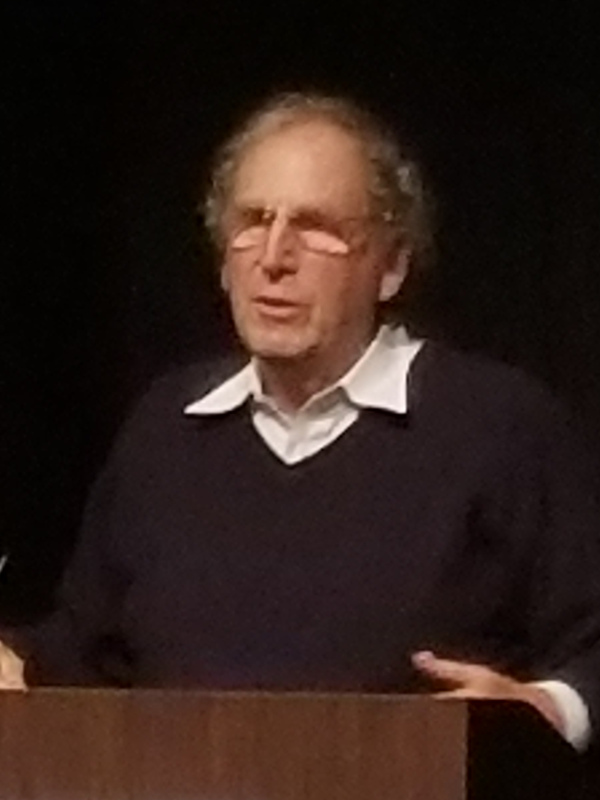
Filmmaker Nathaniel Dorsky in November 2017

Since the 1960s, Dorsky had operated by shooting footage without a specific use in mind and then editing films together from the available shots. For Variations, he began to rely exclusively on newly recorded material. Dorsky worked using a Bolex camera, recording primarily on 16 mm Kodachrome 25 stock. Dorsky's compositions in Variations are influenced by Early Renaissance painting. He noted the era's early use of perspective before the development of vanishing points.

For Dorsky, Variations marked a progression in his polyvalent editing style. He drew connections between shots based on elements like colors, patterns, or iconography. Dorsky sequenced the shots so that they could link back to earlier shots in the montage, beyond the cuts that connect them. By using this strategy, he aimed "to make a montage that opens up yet accumulates."

== Release ==
The film screened in the "Views From the Avant-Garde" program of the 1998 New York Film Festival. In 2000 it was featured in the Whitney Biennial.

== Reception ==
Stephen Holden called the film "visually compelling", asking, "Is there a more beautiful cinematic image than a plastic shopping bag gently blown by the wind across a stretch of pavement?" Amy Taubin described it as looking "as if it were lit up from within". Paul Arthur wrote for Film Comment that it "might be the pinnacle of a long and distinguished career", praising the way Dorsky's "observation of shapes, textures, movements, and colors of mostly commonplace realities organized into densely unhurried skeins of interconnected motifs". Kent Jones likened Dorsky's approach in collecting images to a "a nineteenth-century naturalist combing the woods for new species of fauna" and called Variations "a film that pulses with serenity." J. Hoberman described its tone as "subdued ecstasy" and commented that it "suggests a universal photosynthesis in which humans are surrounded by and permeated with radiance." Arthur named it one of the best films of 1998, and Jones placed it fourth on his year-end list.

Dorsky was contacted by the production staff for the feature film American Beauty, asking how director Sam Mendes could view Variations. The completed film features a scene of a plastic bag blowing in the wind, and upon its release, film critic Stephen Holden wrote that it "borrows an image (and an entire esthetic of beauty)" from Variations. Dorsky stated that, because of the existence of many similar images in earlier films, he was unsure that his shot was appropriated.
