= Alaya (film) =

- Directed by: Nathaniel Dorsky
- Distributed by: Canyon Cinema
- Release date: October 6, 1987
- Running time: 28 minutes
- Country: United States
- Language: Silent

Alaya is a 1987 American avant-garde silent short film directed by Nathaniel Dorsky. It shows sand filmed in different ways.

== Production ==
Dorsky used a combination of film stocks, in color and in black and white, that he had collected during the 1970s. He shot the earliest footage for Alaya while visiting friends in Cape Cod, Massachusetts. To attain extreme magnification of individual grains of sand, he made use of extension tubes. Dorsky's home in San Francisco, California was not far from the beach, so he photographed it during spring, when heavy winds would blow the sand around. Shooting was difficult, and he had to have his camera cleaned repeatedly. Additional filming took place in Death Valley.

Dorsky set up a makeshift soundstage in the cellar of his home. He placed his camera on a tripod with an aperture around f/11. Because he was using multiple extension tubes, a large depth of field was required to keep entire grains in focus. Two photofloods provided the amount of light needed for this, which heated the lens of his camera enough that he could not touch it. While the camera was rolling, Dorsky used an Electrolux vacuum cleaner to blow the sand around on a baking tray.

Alaya was inspired by a Buddhist teacher. It is named after alaya, a Buddhist term for what Dorsky described as "perception without concept".

== Release ==
Alaya premiered at the Berkeley Art Museum and Pacific Film Archive on October 6, 1987, in a program with Pneuma and 17 Reasons Why. It screened on October 20 at the Collective for Living Cinema in New York.

Critic Stephen Holden called Alaya "a flowing visual symphony of sand, wind and light." Amy Taubin reacted negatively, recommending in The Village Voice that "if Dorsky has any other '70s material lying around he should resist bringing it out." When the film was shown in 2000, J. Hoberman characterized it as "a meditation on the infinite that oscillates amazingly between plenitude and emptiness."
