= Triste (film) =

- Directed by: Nathaniel Dorsky
- Distributed by: Canyon Cinema
- Release date: October 29, 1996
- Running time: 18 minutes
- Country: United States
- Language: Silent

Triste is a 1996 American avant-garde silent short film directed by Nathaniel Dorsky. It is the first in a set of "Four Cinematic Songs", which also includes Variations, Arbor Vitae, and Love's Refrain.

In an effort to make use of footage he had shot as far back as the 1970s, Dorsky began editing the film in 1990 and spent five years assembling it. After premiering at the Berkeley Art Museum and Pacific Film Archive, Triste was included in the 1997 New York Film Festival. It helped establish the film form Dorsky has used in his subsequent work—a polyvalent montage built from unobtrusive shots showing everyday scenes.

== Production ==
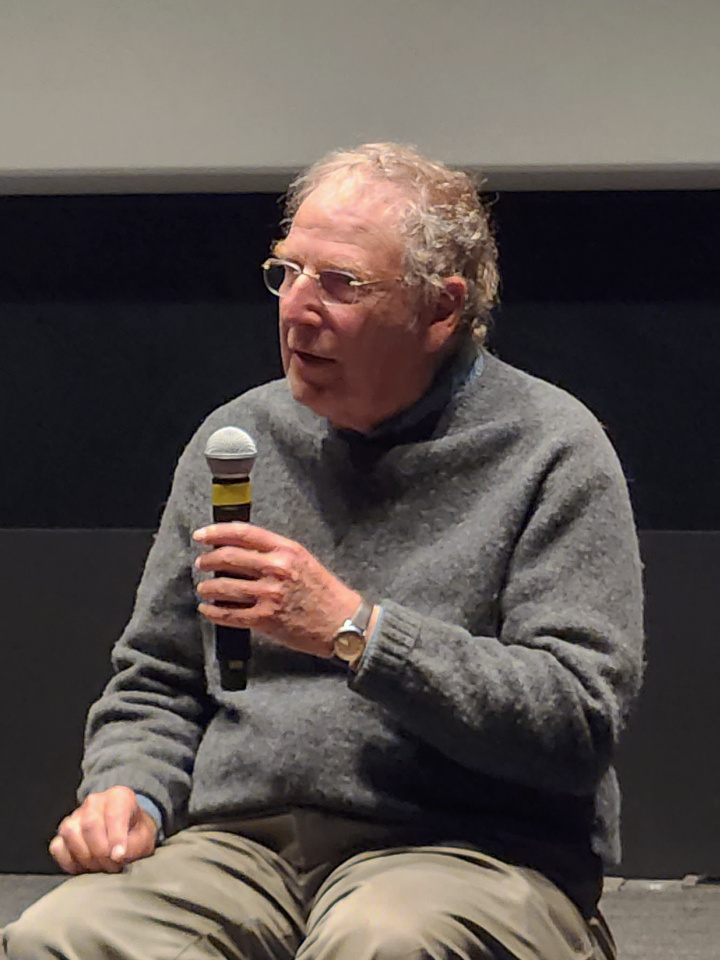
Filmmaker Nathaniel Dorsky

Since the 1960s, Dorsky had operated by shooting footage without a specific use in mind and then editing films together from the available shots. The footage in Triste was taken in San Francisco from 1975 to 1985, during a period when he was teaching film production at the San Francisco Art Institute. He used a Bolex 16 mm camera, shooting primarily on Kodachrome stock.

During the 1980s, Dorsky shifted focus in his subsequent films to experiments with the color and grain of different film stocks. It was not until 1990 that he began editing what would become Triste. He remarked that "for a while, for some strange reason, I couldn't go forward until I had solved all the problems of all the footage I had ever addressed with my camera."

The editing process for Triste took five years. He showed much of the unedited footage to Warren Sonbert in 1995, who was bed-ridden during the final weeks of his life due to complications from AIDS. Dorsky had trouble coming up with a title for the film. He asked his partner Jerome Hiler while they were at the Imperial Tea Court, and Hiler suggested calling it Triste (French for 'sad') since the film dealt with sadness.

== Style ==
The images in Triste are of everyday scenes. For example, the opening sequence depicts rustling branches, writing a letter, a rolled-up hose, and telephone poles. Dorsky's compositions are influenced by Early Renaissance painting. He noted the era's early use of perspective before the development of vanishing points. Shots are simple, without conspicuous camera movements or superimpositions.

When it was released, Dorsky described Triste as his "most mature work". It established the format which Dorsky has continued to use in his later work: silent films around 20 minutes long shown at 18 frames per second. These are lyrical works that fit images into an arrangement balanced based on color and texture. Triste shows Dorsky moving away from artifice, and he joked that its black-and-white shots marked it as his "last avant-garde film".

The film began to establish Dorsky's characteristic editing style, described as "open-form" or "polyvalent". In this approach, the sequence of images does not settle on a common subject or theme; instead, it suppresses anticipation and expectation by continuing to introduce new individual shots. Very few images recur at all, and as a result those that do, such as Hiler's face near the end of the film, take on added significance. Shots proceed at a slow, comfortable pace, usually lasting 10–30 seconds. Critic Holly Willis noted the film's shifts between periods of motion and stillness. Dorsky continued to refine his editing style in Variations, gaining more experience with how to integrate recognizable images into an open-form montage.

== Release ==
Triste first screened on October 29, 1996, at the Berkeley Art Museum and Pacific Film Archive. The Film Arts Foundation and San Francisco Cinematheque presented it at the Yerba Buena Center for the Arts later that December. It was included in the 1997 New York Film Festival as part of its "Views From the Avant-Garde" section. Because the film is intended to be projected at a lower frame rate of 18 frames per second, the projector at the Walter Reade Theater had to be converted in order to accommodate it, at a cost of several thousand dollars.

== Reception ==
In a review for The New York Times, Stephen Holden wrote that Triste "compiles a vision of the world that pulses with a vague but compelling sense of melancholy." Amy Taubin identified it as a highlight of the New York Film Festival.
