= Hours for Jerome =

1982 experimental film by Nathaniel Dorsky

- Directed by: Nathaniel Dorsky
- Starring: Nathaniel Dorsky; Jerome Hiler
- Cinematography: Nathaniel Dorsky
- Edited by: Nathaniel Dorsky
- Release date: December 4, 1982
- Running time: 50 minutes (original cut)
- Country: United States
- Language: Silent

Hours for Jerome is a 1982 American silent experimental film in two parts by Nathaniel Dorsky. It captures daily events from Dorsky's life with his partner, artist Jerome Hiler, around Lake Owassa in New Jersey and in Manhattan. These are presented in 66 sequences of disparate images, separated from each other by black leader. The film is structured around the four seasons, with Part 1 showing spring and summer while Part 2 revolves around fall and winter.

The material for Hours for Jerome was filmed from 1966 to 1970. However, Dorsky had difficulty editing it and shelved the footage before returning to it years later. He released the completed film in December 1982 and restored it in 1998, slightly condensing it in the process. Hours for Jerome is Dorsky's earliest endeavor toward developing his distinct style of polyvalent montage, an approach inspired by the early writings of poet John Ashbery. Critics have compared the film's ardent depiction of everyday life to traditional books of hours, an association invoked by its title. In 2012, the film was chosen for preservation in the National Film Registry by the Library of Congress.

== Description ==
Hours for Jerome is divided into two parts structured around the four seasons. Part 1 shows spring and summer, while Part 2 revolves around fall and winter. Each part consists of many shorter sequences of images, or stanzas, separated by black leader. Part 1 comprises 28 stanzas, and Part 2 has 38.

The content of the film's images is wide-ranging, with no established narrative or explicit connections between successive images. For example, one stanza depicts a woman sitting in a park, people shown in silhouette at an aquarium, two rhinoceroses at a zoo, and a plane in the sky. Other stanzas contain only a single shot. The film opens with an extended shot of a sunrise seen through trees and closes with a black-and-white shot taken from a car driving into Manhattan. Poets Anne Waldman and Michael Brownstein appear briefly in the film, in a pastiche of driving scenes made using rear projection.

== Production ==
=== Filming ===
Prior to shooting Hours for Jerome, Dorsky had made Ingreen, A Fall Trip Home, and Summerwind, a trilogy dealing with adolescence and small-town life, during the mid-1960s. He continued recording footage after Summerwind, and the earliest images used in Hours for Jerome were captured in 1966, showing the same forest from his previous film in winter. Dorsky was originally interested in exploring "the deep and mysterious power of the life force in the forest". He filmed near Lake Owassa in rural New Jersey, where he and his partner Jerome Hiler lived, and in New York City, where they had an apartment.

Dorsky filmed with a Bolex 16 mm camera, equipped with an Angénieux telephoto lens. He shot on various reversal film stocks, primarily Kodachrome II. Kodachrome was known for creating intense, saturated color, and Dorsky managed to increase the contrast through underexposure. He also revised the color by intentionally distorting the balance during the color timing process.

Dorsky began editing the footage, producing the more conspicuous jump cuts and rapid intercutting seen in Hours for Jerome. However, an overall design for a film did not emerge during this period. As a result, he finished shooting in 1970 and the material was shown only to friends, in private home screenings. The following year, Dorsky moved with Hiler to San Francisco. He experienced a severe creative block and found it difficult to edit, due to the difference in environmental conditions and distance from longstanding social connections. He considered the project a failure and shelved the footage.

=== Rediscovery and editing ===
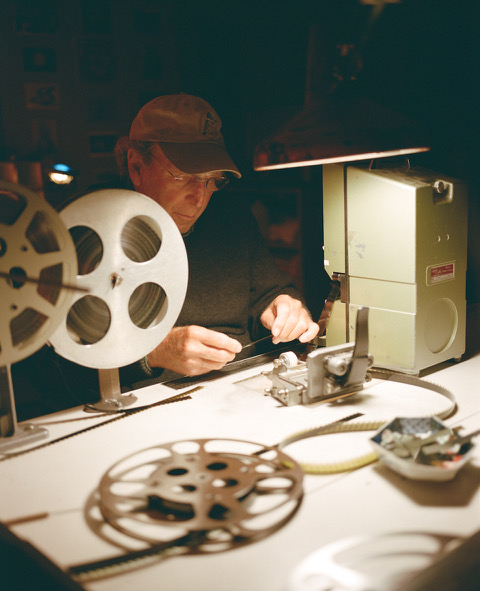
Filmmaker Nathaniel Dorsky (pictured in 2025) at his editing table

In 1978, poet Larry Fagin, whom Dorsky had known in New York, visited him in San Francisco. Fagin had not seen the footage before, so Dorsky retrieved and projected it. He was inspired to construct a film out of the material, which he found "quite haunting…because it seemed that it came from the simplicity of my heart, from a simple attempt to show very sincere things". He spent 1980 to 1982 editing the footage. He began by separating it into four groups for the different seasons. This allowed him to work on a smaller scale and made the editing process more manageable. He edited each season separately, cycling through them by spending a week at a time on one before revisiting the next.

Dorsky's decision to introduce black leader between each stanza came as a way to "open up space" within the film, similar to a pause in a musical composition. This technique was adopted from a 1966 untitled film by Hiler, later released as Fool's Spring. He closely observed the afterimage that lingered after a stanza and considered how its colors would carry over into the following segment.

Once the four sections were complete, Dorsky combined them and made adjustments to improve the transitions between the sections. The film's two-part structure emerged because he found it difficult to adequately balance different elements in the stanzas when working in a longer format. Filmmaker Warren Sonbert suggested the editing was "too descriptive", advocating a more open, organic form less guided by memories from that period. However, Dorsky felt it was important for the film to be rooted in a strong sense of place. Hours for Jerome became his first film not to include a sound track, a decision made to give the images more "vitality". Dorsky maintained this practice in all of his subsequent films. The title Hours for Jerome was decided after the film had been sent to the laboratory for prints to be made.

== Analysis ==
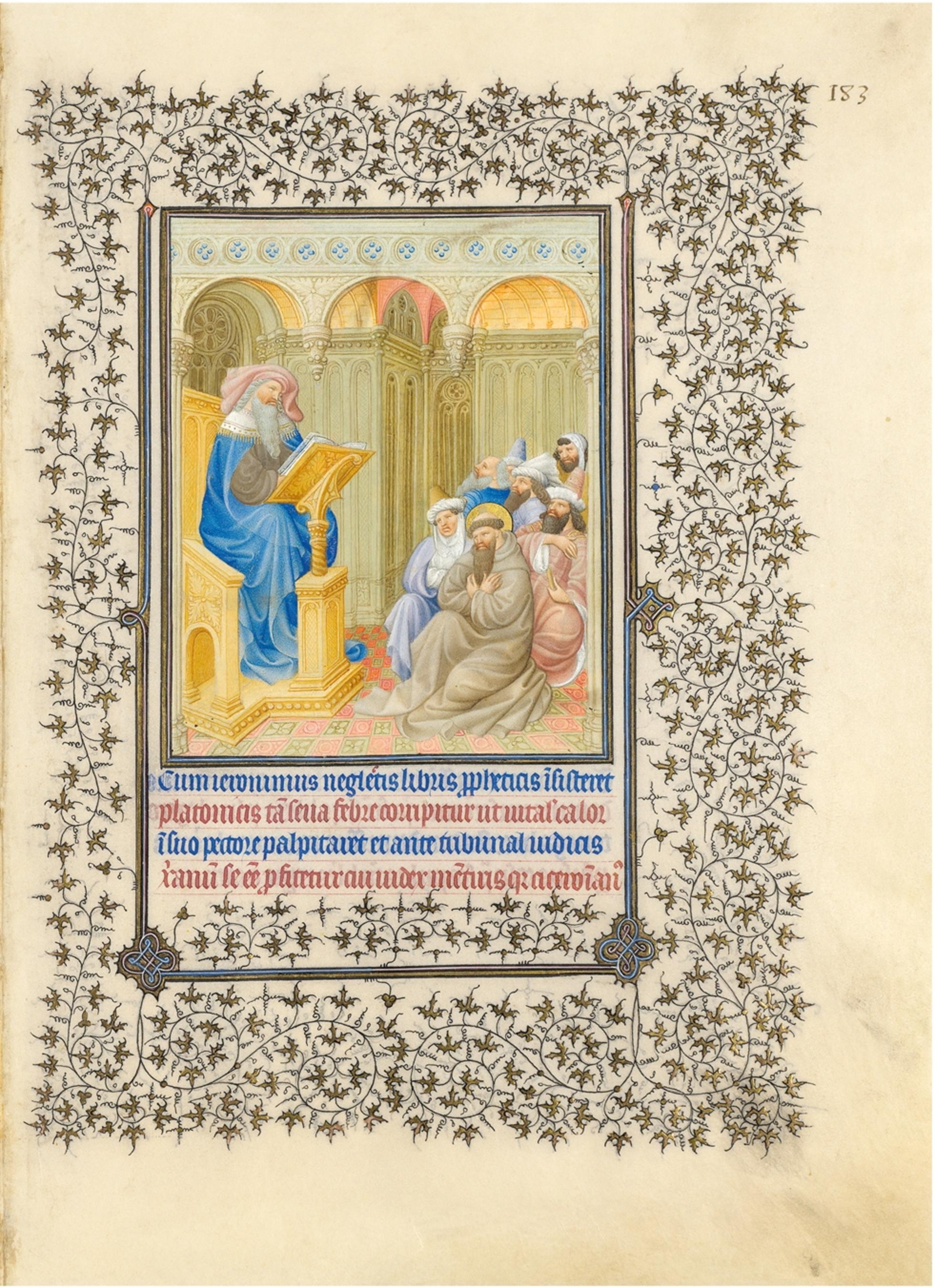
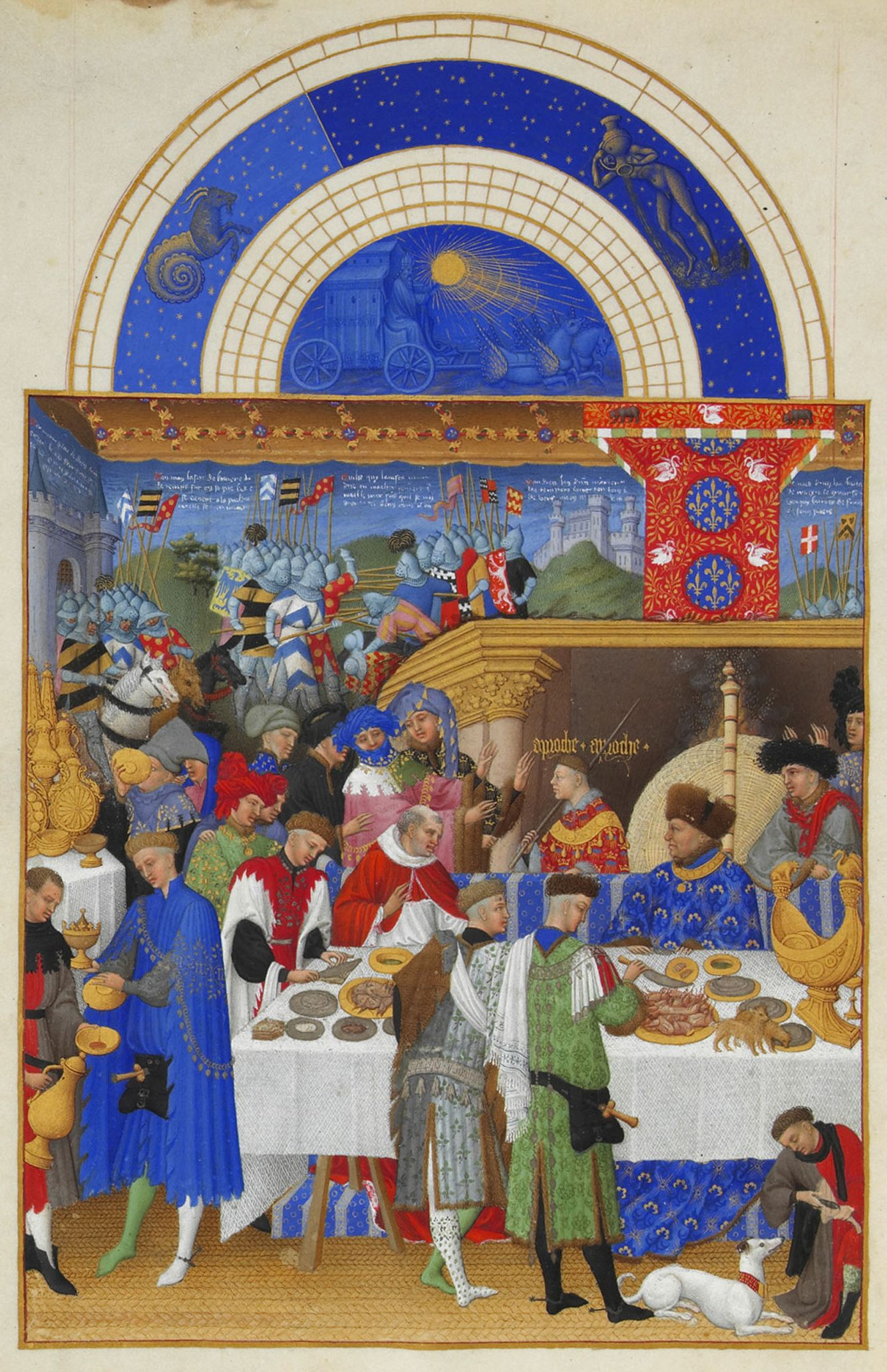
The Limbourg brothers' illustrations of Saint Jerome in the Belles Heures (left) and John, Duke of Berry receiving guests in the Très Riches Heures (right)

The film's title evokes a traditional book of hours, a devotional text from the Middle Ages containing prayers to be said at different times of the day. The most prominent examples are illuminated manuscripts featuring ornate decorations made from expensive pigments and precious metals. These often begin with a calendar of illustrations that reflect the seasonal cycle. Although the title refers to Jerome Hiler, it also alludes to Saint Jerome, a common subject in the miniatures. Dorsky was influenced by the Limbourg brothers' paintings in the Belles Heures and the Très Riches Heures. Scholar John Powers notes the way in which bold color imbues ordinary events with a sense of fervor and abundance, as in those books of hours. Francisco Algarín Navarro and Carlos Saldaña compare the color palette to stained glass, noting the use of red, yellow, green, and blue.

Hours for Jerome is Dorsky's earliest endeavor toward developing a cinematic form known as polyvalent, or autogenous, montage. This form, theorized during the 1960s in association with filmmakers including Hiler, Sonbert, and David Brooks, eschews any kind of linguistic information in favor of a purely visual experience. At the encouragement of Brownstein, Dorsky had read John Ashbery's The Tennis Court Oath and Rivers and Mountains. Ashbery's paratactic style of poetry eschews coordinating conjunctions, in favor of a disjunctive sequence of images in which subtle resonances and repetitions gradually emerge. Dorsky's approach to polyvalent montage adapts this technique, such that each new image may connect not only to the one immediately preceding it, but also to others from earlier in the film. His editing style is inspired by Japanese and Chinese poetry, breaking with the type of parallel editing popularized by D. W. Griffith and Soviet filmmakers. In Hours for Jerome, the polyvalence operates primarily across different sequences, whereas his later films develop this across individual shots.

Within a stanza, the shots often have heterogeneous formal properties. Dorsky makes use of a large number of filming and editing techniques to create contrasts between successive shots, through the direction of camera movements, zooms, varying shot durations, single-frame articulations, superimpositions, time-lapse photography, and varying shutter speeds.

== Release ==
Hours for Jerome premiered on December 4, 1982, in a program where it was preceded by Dorsky's 1964 film A Fall Trip Home. This original cut of the film exists in a single print, purchased by the Tokyo Image Forum. The two parts are generally screened together but have on rare occasion been shown on their own.

Dorsky worked with the Berkeley Art Museum and Pacific Film Archive to restore the film in 1998. Dorsky did not want to use a digital intermediate and was initially concerned that a print from an internegative would be unable to replicate the look of the camera original to his satisfaction. Since Hours for Jerome is only distributed as a 16 mm print and Kodak would eventually stop making color reversal stock, he provided detailed timing notes to the archive so they could make a preservation internegative. To improve the flow and pacing between segments, he removed some footage from the restored version, particularly around the end of the summer and winter sections. He indicated that the film should ideally be projected at 20 frames per second. Since this configuration is only possible on a small number of projectors, he requested that Part 1 be projected at 18 fps and Part 2 at 18 or 24 fps.

== Critical reception ==
After the film's premiere, artist Janis Crystal Lipzin wrote that it "deserves the attention that such extended concentration demands." The Village Voice reviewer J. Hoberman said that the film "suffers from the absence of a strong conceptual grid, but…is so frequently gorgeous that it scarcely matters—you're content to watch it in an eternal present." He compared it to romantic diary films by Sonbert, Andrew Noren, and Peter Hutton in particular for its attention to light and landscape, while highlighting Dorsky's distinctive editing style and use of bold colors. Wheeler Winston Dixon wrote that Dorsky's "precise control of stop-framing, light, grain texture, and color…directly reflects the patience and craft that [he] brings to all his work." Scott MacDonald praised its depiction of the passing year, calling it "America's most compelling cinematic paean to temperate-zone seasonality".

In 2012, Hours for Jerome was included in the annual selection of 25 motion pictures selected for preservation in the National Film Registry of the Library of Congress being deemed "culturally, historically, or aesthetically significant". Critic Matthew Flanagan chose it as one of the ten greatest films ever for the 2012 Sight & Sound poll.

== See also ==
- 2015 New York Film Festival

== Bibliography ==
- Algarín Navarro, Francisco; Saldaña, Carlos, eds. (2023). Illuminated Hours: The Early Cinema of Nathaniel Dorsky and Jerome Hiler. Asociación Lumière. ISBN 978-8-4940-9766-9.
- Dixon, Wheeler Winston (1997). The Exploding Eye: A Re-Visionary History of 1960s American Experimental Cinema. SUNY Press. ISBN 978-0-7914-3565-6.
- MacDonald, Scott (2001). The Garden in the Machine: A Field Guide to Independent Films About Place. University of California Press. ISBN 978-0-520-22738-5.
- MacDonald, Scott (2006). A Critical Cinema 5: Interviews with Independent Filmmakers. University of California Press. ISBN 978-0-520-93908-0.
- Powers, John (2023). Technology and the Making of Experimental Film Culture. Oxford University Press. ISBN 978-0-19-768339-2.
- Sitney, P. Adams (2014). The Cinema of Poetry. Oxford University Press. ISBN 978-0-19-933702-6.
- Ziebell, Sarah (2010). "Preserving the Avant-Garde at the Pacific Film Archive". In Anker, Steve; Geritz, Kathy; Seid, Steve (eds.). Radical Light: Alternative Film and Video in the San Francisco Bay Area, 1945–2000. University of California Press. ISBN 978-0-520-24911-0.
