= Don't Blink – Robert Frank =

- Directed by: Laura Israel
- Written by: Laura Israel; Melinda Shopsin
- Produced by: Melinda Shopsin; Lukas Fitze
- Cinematography: Lisa Rinzler; Edward Lachman
- Edited by: Alex Bingham
- Music by: Rachel Fox; Hal Willner
- Production companies: Assemblage Films; Arte France (in association with)
- Distributed by: Grasshopper Film
- Release dates: October 4, 2015 (New York Film Festival); July 12, 2016
- Running time: 82 minutes
- Country: United States
- Language: English

Don't Blink – Robert Frank is a 2015 documentary film about the life and work of photographer and filmmaker Robert Frank.

== Synopsis ==
The film is a portrait of Frank's life and career. It covers the making of his book The Americans, his documentaries featuring friends such as Allen Ginsberg and Jack Kerouac, and a film commissioned by The Rolling Stones.

== Soundtrack ==
Music in the film includes songs performed by The Mekons, Tom Waits, The Velvet Underground, Charles Mingus, The Kills, Yo La Tengo, Johnny Thunders, Natalie MacMaster, Bob Dylan, The Rolling Stones, New Order, The White Stripes, and Patti Smith.

== Release ==
=== Critical response ===
Don't Blink – Robert Frank has received positive reviews from critics. Review aggregator Rotten Tomatoes gives the film an approval rating of 84%, based on 32 reviews, with an average rating of 6.7/10. On Metacritic, the film has a score of 75 out of 100, based on 10 critics, indicating "generally favorable" reviews.

In a review for the Los Angeles Times, Kenneth Turan wrote that "[r]ather than being a film about an artist, it’s an attempt to show us what it's like to actually be an artist. [...] Don't Blink is directed by Laura Israel, Frank's film editor for more than 20 years, and includes generous selections from those works. Having a filmmaker that Frank is comfortable with in charge means that the photographer lets his guard down here more than he might have with a relative stranger." Writing for The New York Times, A. O. Scott stated that "[Laura Israel's] film is less like a full biography than like a magazine profile, which is as it should be. You leave with a vivid sense of the man’s living presence and a reasonably thorough account of his life, work and associations."

A review for Variety thought the "unconventional editorial style [...] involving rapid-fire collages [...] often leaves one feeling aesthetically pummeled to the point of exhaustion, and portends only limited commercial appeal for the project outside die-hard Frank aficionados."

=== Box office ===
As of October 13, 2016, the film has grossed $69,531 at the box office.
