= Pneuma (film) =

- Directed by: Nathaniel Dorsky
- Distributed by: Canyon Cinema
- Release date: June 7, 1983
- Running time: 28 minutes
- Country: United States
- Language: Silent

Pneuma is a 1983 American avant-garde short film directed by Nathaniel Dorsky. It captures grain patterns from unexposed film stocks.

== Description ==
Pneuma is a silent film 28 minutes in duration. It comprises a succession of muted colors, similar to color field or all-over paintings. These contain different patterns of film grain, with variations in scale. The film ends with a long blue section which Dorsky likened to a cadenza.

== Production ==
Dorsky made a series of personal, autobiographical films in New York during the 1960s before shifting his focus toward nature and the world around him. In 1971 he moved to California, where he spent some time working on exploitation films. Disoriented in a new environment, he began to feel "lost and depressed" during this period.

While working on a roll of film, Dorsky lost interest in shooting on the rest of it and submitted it unfinished to a film laboratory. When reviewing the result, he found that he liked the unphotographed section more than anything he had shot. He decided to start collecting unused film stocks instead of recording new footage. The film's ending originated with an old roll of Ansco 400 stock Dorsky had bought in a camera store in Los Angeles. Shortly before the laboratory stopped processing it, he had them develop the unexposed roll and found it had a deep blue tint. He used excerpts of this to create a section a few minutes in duration as the film's conclusion.

In 1976 Dorsky had the processed rolls rephotographed, sometimes increasing the contrast or magnifying the images to enlarge the grain patterns. He eventually began reviewing this available material after the completion of his 1982 film Hours for Jerome. He edited the film from nearly twenty types of film emulsion. The film's title refers to the Stoic concept of pneuma, establishing a parallel between the soul and the photographic development process.

== Release ==
Pneuma premiered at the Berkeley Art Museum and Pacific Film Archive on June 7, 1983, in a program with Hours for Jerome and Ariel.

Among Dorsky's early films, Pneuma received the most disapproval from critics. Amy Taubin panned it in The Village Voice, suggesting that she would have walked out if not for her professional responsibilities. She wrote that "Pneuma may be a satisfying personal fetish or meditation object, [but] it's hardly an opener for a film program". In Afterimage, Chuck Kleinhans questioned if a viewer could "remain aesthetically engaged with a work that goes on for a long time with minimal change or difference".
