= Arboretum Cycle =

Film cycle by Nathaniel Dorsky

The Arboretum Cycle is a seven-part film cycle by American experimental filmmaker Nathaniel Dorsky. The films—Elohim, Abaton, Coda, Ode, September, Monody, and Epilogue—were shot in 2017 at the Strybing Arboretum in San Francisco. Dorsky made the series to capture the interaction between light and plants in the garden.

== Works ==
Elohim, the first film in the cycle, captures a sense of stillness and is dominated by muted green, yellow, and brown shades. Abaton shows the garden in late winter, with red and purple colors just beginning to emerge.

Coda and Ode show spring and summer. Red and purple become most prominent as the flowering plants bloom.

September showcases the deep green of leaves and trees, with some late blooms still remaining. It and Monody, filmed in autumn, feature a large tree in the arboretum.

Epilogue is the final film in the cycle. Because it was shot in winter, it has naturally low light.

== Production ==
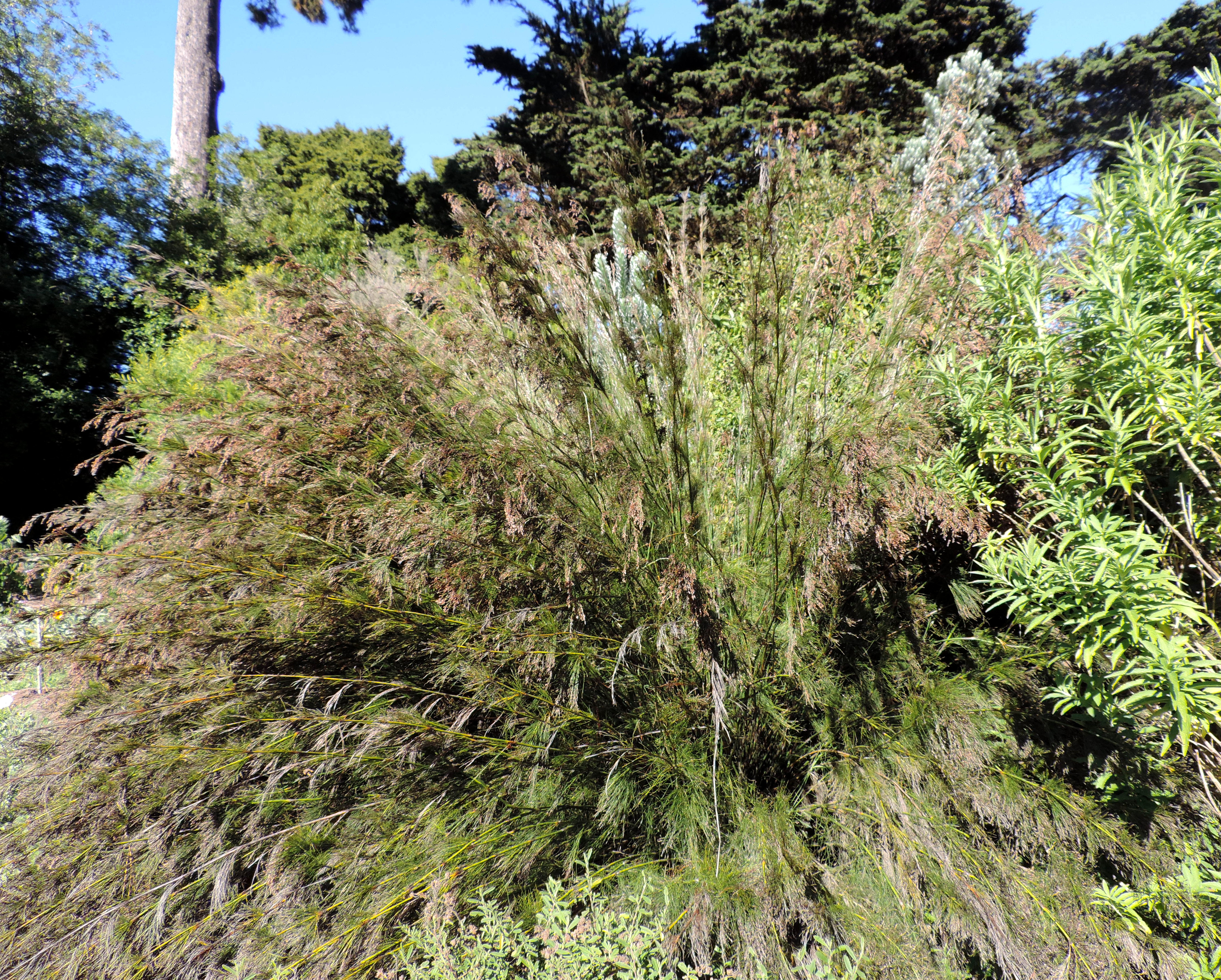
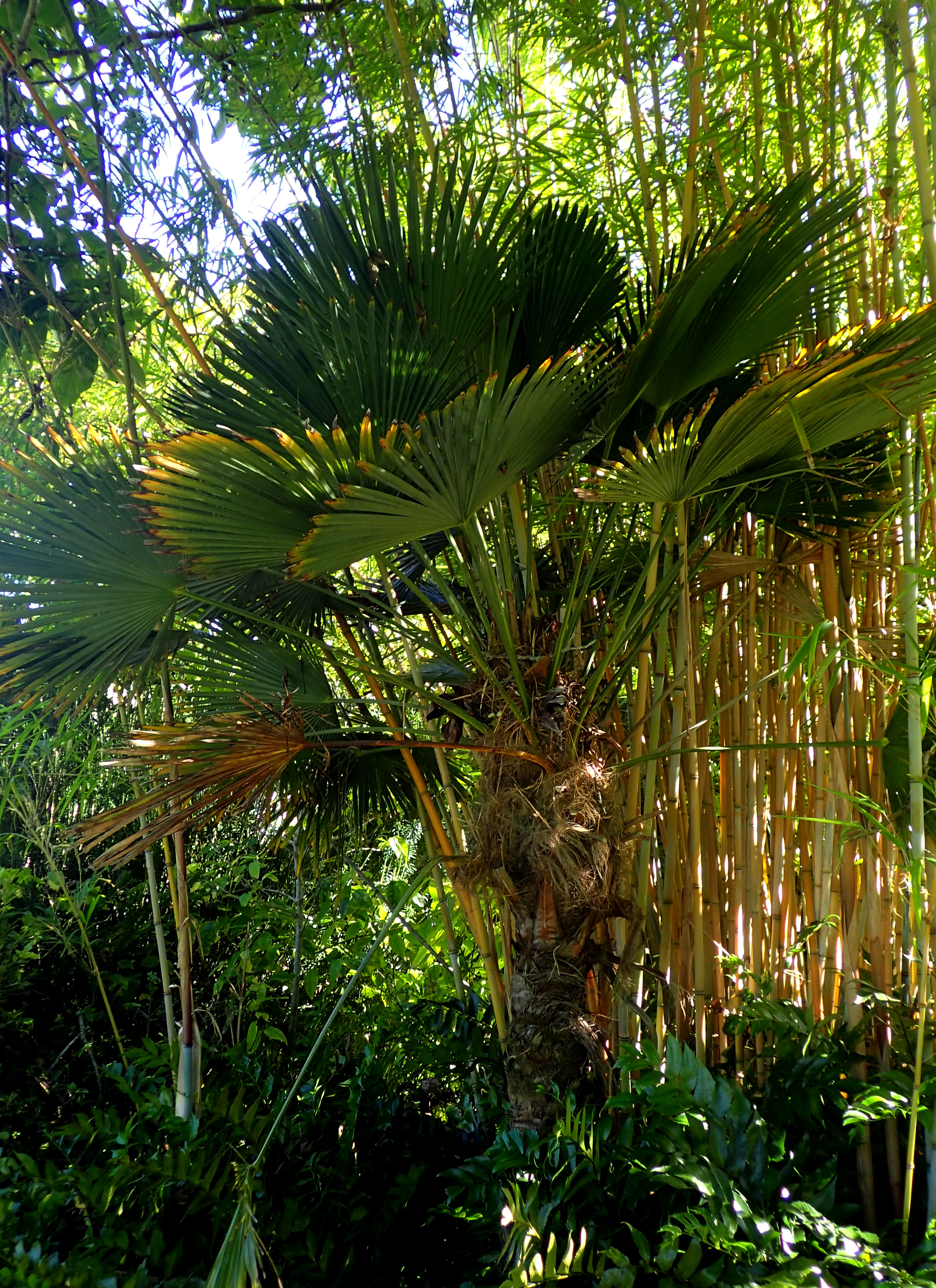
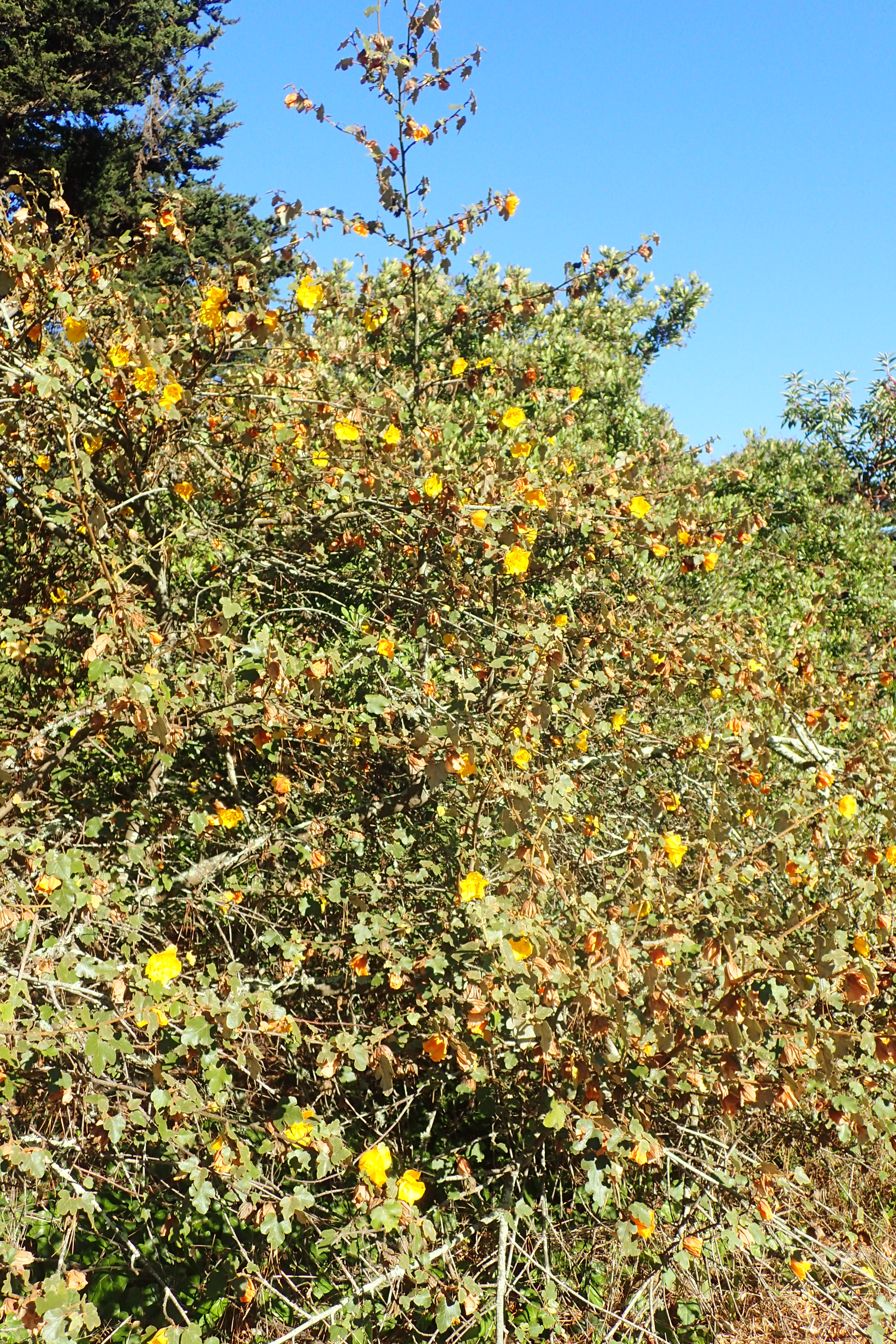
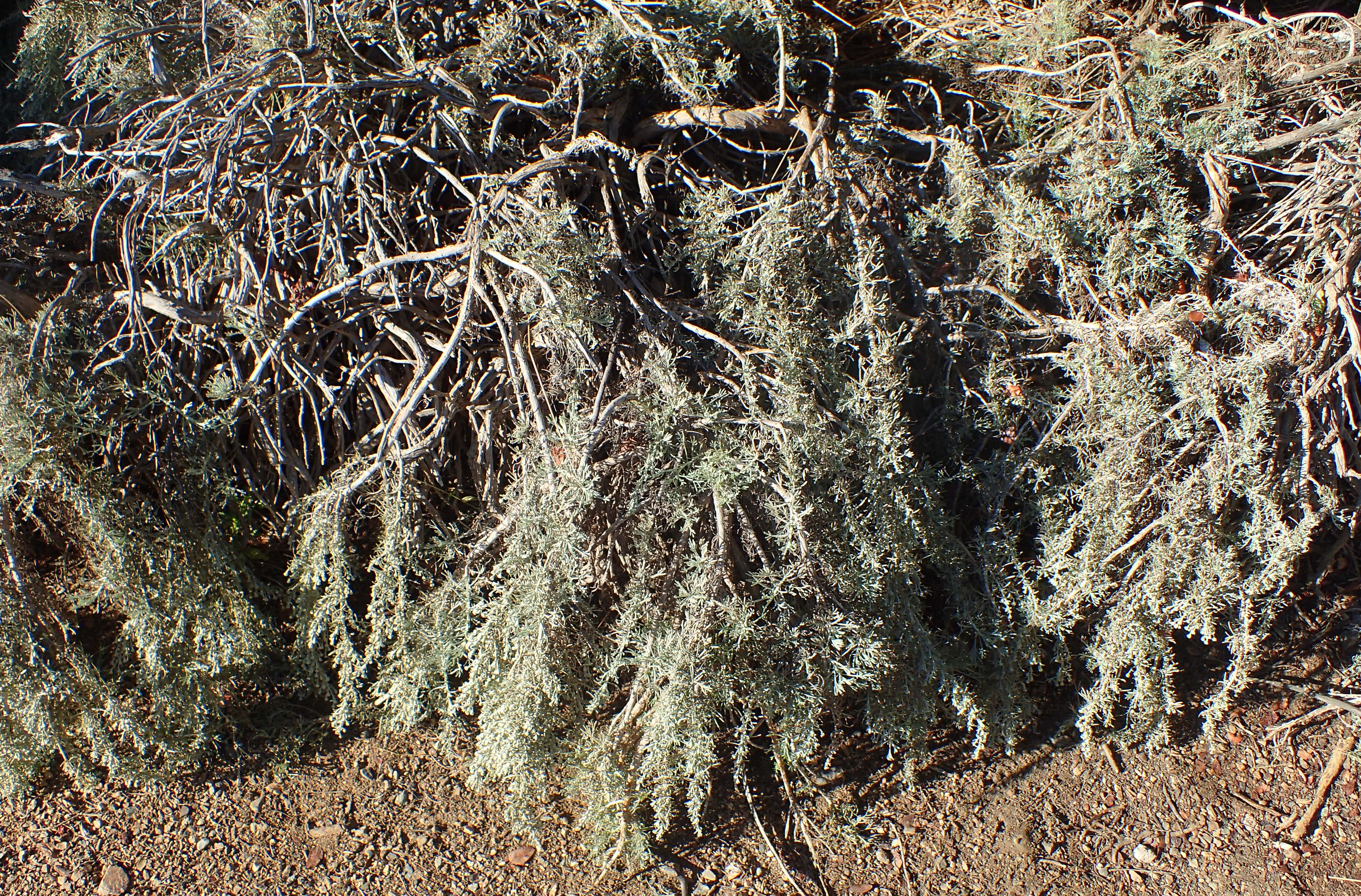
Plants from the arboretum in September 2016

Dorsky visited the Strybing Arboretum on the Lunar New Year of 2017. The area had recently had heavy rains following a five-year drought. He began meditating in the gardens during afternoons and felt a connection to the space, which was located close to his home. Dorsky decided to "make a film about the way the plants there manifest in light or vice versa."

He began shooting footage in February 2017 for what became Elohim. After editing Elohim, Dorsky noticed the garden looked "more adolescent" and made a second film, Abaton. Coda was intended to end the series, but he ended up working in the same location through December. The resulting seven films show one annual cycle for the plants in the arboretum.

Dorsky shot on Eastman Color Negative film using a Bolex 16 mm camera. He edited the footage at his home studio in the Richmond District. Editing was performed manually with a film viewer and splicer, without digital equipment.

== Style ==
The content of the films focuses on capturing light in different ways rather than reproducing the pro-filmic object. The actions depicted, such as swaying in the wind, have an uncertain sense of time without definite beginning and end. Dorsky's compositions use strong shadows, often as a dominating element in the foreground.

The Arboretum Cycle marked a shift away from the style of polyvalent montage Dorsky had developed in his previous films and toward in-camera improvisations. While filming, he used changes in focus to create shifts within individual shots. For example, one shot of dark branches covering a sunny meadow give the resemblance of a landscape at night or a starry night sky. Dorsky also oscillated the aperture to create fluctuations in light intensity, which he likened to a musical vibrato. His extreme use of underexposure gives some images the illusion of day for night.

The subtle shifts within each shot mean that cuts between them are a larger source of action. Dorsky uses darkened images to make cuts between shots less noticeable.

== Release ==
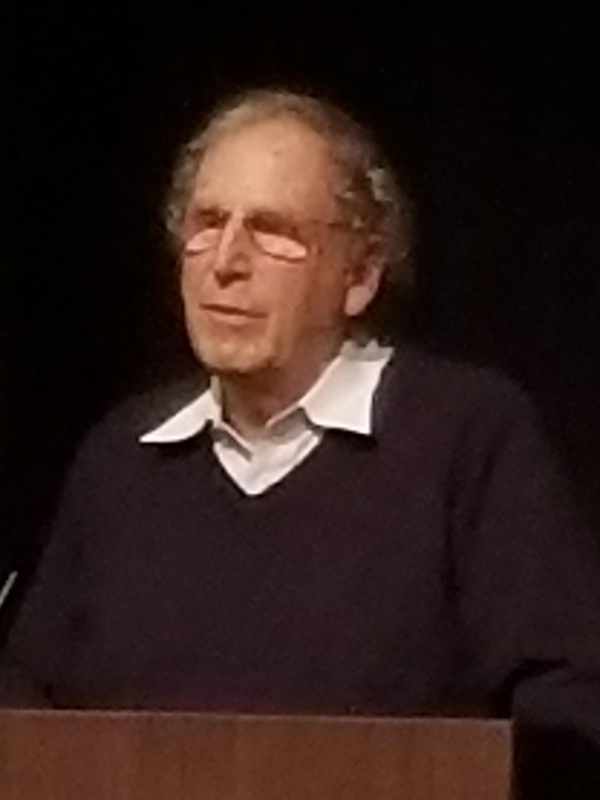
Nathaniel Dorsky at a screening of Elohim and Abaton

The first four films of the cycle premiered at the Harvard Film Archive on October 15, 2017. The Arboretum Cycle in its entirety premiered on February 5, 2018, at Duke University. An adjunctive film, Colophon (for the Arboretum Cycle), premiered at the 2018 Toronto International Film Festival. Dorsky only presents the cycle on 16 mm film; it is not distributed on digital media.
