= Belles Heures =

Belles Heures may refer to:

- Belles Heures du Duc de Berry
- Très Belles Heures du Duc de Berry
- Les Très Belles Heures de Notre-Dame
