= Everything Is Copy =

2015 documentary film

Everything Is Copy — Nora Ephron: Scripted & Unscripted
- Directed by: Jacob Bernstein; Nick Hooker
- Produced by: Graydon Carter; Annabelle Dunne; Carly Hugo; Sheila Nevins; Matthew Parker
- Starring: Meg Ryan; Meryl Streep; Tom Hanks; Steven Spielberg; Mike Nichols; Gay Talese; Richard Cohen
- Cinematography: Christine Ng; Bradford Young
- Edited by: Bob Eisenhardt
- Music by: Joel Goodman
- Production company: Loveless
- Distributed by: HBO
- Release dates: September 29, 2015 (New York Film Festival); March 21, 2016
- Running time: 89 minutes
- Country: United States
- Language: English

Everything Is Copy — Nora Ephron: Scripted & Unscripted is an American documentary film which premiered on March 21, 2016, on HBO. Directed and written by Jacob Bernstein and Nick Hooker, the film explores the life and legacy of legendary writer and film director Nora Ephron.

== Premise ==
Everything Is Copy — Nora Ephron: Scripted & Unscripted follows Ephron's career "from her gig as the “mail girl” at Newsweek to reporting for the New York Post to becoming a prestigious essayist at Esquire to successfully writing and directing Hollywood movies that revitalized the romantic comedy genre. The film captures Ephron's "razor-sharp wit while at the same time presenting her flaws through interviews with her closest friends like Meg Ryan, Meryl Streep, Tom Hanks, Steven Spielberg, the late Mike Nichols and journalists like Gay Talese and Richard Cohen."

== Persons featured ==
The documentary features interviews with Meg Ryan, Meryl Streep, Tom Hanks, Steven Spielberg, Mike Nichols, Rosie O’Donnell, Rob Reiner, Rita Wilson, Gay Talese, and Richard Cohen.

== Release ==
=== Marketing ===
On March 6, 2016, HBO released the first trailer for the film.

=== Premiere ===
On September 29, 2015, the film held its official premiere during the annual New York Film Festival.

== Reception ==
=== Critical response ===
Everything Is Copy has been met with a positive response from critics. On the review aggregation website Rotten Tomatoes, the film holds a 100% approval rating with an average rating of 8.5 out of 10, based on 14 reviews. Metacritic, which uses a weighted average, assigned the season a score of 88 out of 100 based on 6 critics, indicating "universal acclaim".

=== Awards and nominations ===
Award	Date of ceremony	Category	Recipient(s)	Result	Ref.
Palm Springs International Film Festival	January 10, 2016	Audience Prize for Documentary Feature	Everything Is Copy	Won	

== See also ==
- List of HBO Films films
