= Richard Roud =

Founder of New York Film Festival (1929–1989)

- Born: July 6, 1929; Boston, Massachusetts
- Died: February 13, 1989 (aged 59); Nîmes, France
- Education: University of Wisconsin; University of Birmingham
- Occupations: Writer on film; film festival director
- Known for: Co-founder of the New York Film Festival

Richard Stanley Roud (July 6, 1929 – February 13, 1989) was an American writer on film and co-founder, with Amos Vogel, of the New York Film Festival (NYFF). At the NYFF, Roud was a former program director, and latterly director, from 1963 to 1987.

== Biography ==
Roud was born in Boston to a second-generation American family whose origins were in Riga, Latvia. He graduated from the University of Wisconsin in 1950, and after spending a year in Paris and Montpellier on a Fulbright scholarship, undertook post-graduate study at the University of Birmingham. In the 1950s, he became the London correspondent of the French film magazine Cahiers du cinéma. He started writing for British film publication Sight and Sound magazine in 1956 and at the time was teaching English part-time at a United States Air Force base. In 1959 he became programme officer for the National Film Theatre in London and in 1960 he became the director of the London Film Festival. In 1963 co-founded the New York Film Festival, where he headed up the selection committee. He worked for both festivals until he was forced by the BFI director to make a choice and in February 1970, he ceased to be the director of the London Film Festival to concentrate on the New York festival. From 1963 to 1969, he was also film critic for The Guardian in London, a role from which he was fired after writing a one-word review of The Sound of Music (simply, "No."), and was later a roving arts correspondent for the newspaper. He also wrote annual reports from the Cannes Film Festival, and other articles, for Sight and Sound. In June 1987 he suffered heart problems and was taken seriously ill and was ordered to resign as director of the New York film festival after the 1987 edition.

His tastes were described by his colleagues at the London Film Festival as idiosyncratic and fiercely held. He promoted many French nouvelle vague directors and revived interest in Max Ophüls La signora di tutti.

Roud's books include Max Ophuls: An Index (1958), Cinema – A Critical Dictionary – The Major Film-Makers (1980), a two-volume work which he edited; A Passion for Film (1983), a biography of Henri Langlois, the former director of the Cinémathèque Française; and two books on nouvelle vague directors Straub and Godard. For several years he was writing a biography of François Truffaut and submitted a draft just before Roud's death. A volume of Roud's previously uncollected writings, Decades Never Start on Time: A Richard Roud Anthology, was published by the BFI in 2014.

He was made a Knight in the French Legion of Honor in 1979 and was the recipient of the National Society of Film Critics Awards (USA) Special Award in January 1988.

== Death ==
In January 1989 he went on holiday to the South of France where he suffered a massive heart attack and died in hospital in Nîmes on 13 February 1989.
