= 20th Century Women =

2016 film by Mike Mills

- Theatrical release poster
- Directed by: Mike Mills
- Written by: Mike Mills
- Produced by: Megan Ellison; Anne Carey; Youree Henley
- Starring: Annette Bening; Elle Fanning; Greta Gerwig; Lucas Jade Zumann; Billy Crudup
- Cinematography: Sean Porter
- Edited by: Leslie Jones
- Music by: Roger Neill
- Production companies: Annapurna Pictures; Modern People; Archer Gray
- Distributed by: A24
- Release dates: October 8, 2016 (New York Film Festival); December 28, 2016 (United States)
- Running time: 118 minutes
- Country: United States
- Language: English
- Budget: $7 million
- Box office: $9.4 million

20th Century Women is a 2016 American coming-of-age comedy drama film written and directed by Mike Mills and starring Annette Bening, Elle Fanning, Greta Gerwig, Lucas Jade Zumann, and Billy Crudup. It is set in 1979 in Southern California and partly inspired by Mills's childhood.

The film was produced by Annapurna Pictures in 2015. It had its world premiere at the New York Film Festival on October 8, 2016, and was theatrically released by A24 on December 28. The film received critical acclaim, and it was nominated for Best Motion Picture – Musical or Comedy and Best Actress (Bening) at the 74th Golden Globe Awards, as well as Best Original Screenplay at the 89th Academy Awards.

== Plot ==
In 1979, 15-year-old Jamie Fields lives in Santa Barbara with his 55-year-old single mother, Dorothea, and their two tenants: Abbie Porter, a 24-year-old photographer being treated for cervical cancer, and William, a carpenter and mechanic. Jamie's best friend is 17-year-old Julie Hamlin.

Concerned she is having trouble connecting with her son, Dorothea asks Abbie and Julie to help raise him, but Jamie responds to this by going to a rock concert in Los Angeles with some friends. When he returns, Julie tells him she had unprotected sex. Jamie accompanies Abbie to a doctor's appointment, where she learns she is cancer-free but will likely be unable to have children, and he reads a magazine article about home pregnancy tests. He buys one for Julie and helps her take it. It comes back negative. To thank Jamie for his support, Abbie makes him a mixtape, and she begins to confide in him, telling him she moved back home from New York after her cancer diagnosis, but her mother could not handle that the cancer was caused by her use of DES, a fertility drug, while Abbie was in utero, so Abbie moved in with Dorothea.

One day, after seeing Julie sneak out Jamie's window, Dorothea talks with her, and they discuss why Dorothea has had no real relationships since Jamie's father left years earlier. Dorothea asks Abbie to show her "the modern world", so they go to a punk club, where William kisses Dorothea. Aware that he has a sexual relationship with Abbie, Dorothea does not return his advance. Abbie gets in a fight and William tells her he no longer wants to sleep with her. Abbie goes to talk to Jamie and, finding him in bed with Julie, says Julie is disempowering Jamie and advises them both to leave Santa Barbara.

Jamie asks Abbie to take him to the club, and he gets drunk and kisses a woman. Meanwhile, Dorothea teaches William how to pursue a serious relationship, as opposed to casual sex. When Abbie tells Dorothea about Jamie's night, Dorothea is not upset, though she is wistful that, as his mother, she can never see what Jamie is like out in the world.

Abbie lends Jamie some books about feminism, and he finds them interesting, but Dorothea thinks they are too much for him and scolds Abbie. At a dinner party, Abbie says she is tired because she is menstruating, and, frustrated by the discomfort the word causes, she makes everyone at the table say "menstruation". Julie then describes her first period and first sexual encounter, and Dorothea ends the gathering.

Jamie tells Julie he no longer wants her to spend the night if she just wants to talk. Hurt, she suggests they take a road trip up the coast. At a hotel, Jamie says he loves Julie, but she says she feels too close to him to have sex. They argue, and Julie accuses Jamie of being like "other guys". Jamie storms off. Julie calls Dorothea, but by the time she, Abbie, and William arrive, Jamie has returned. Dorothea tells Jamie that she asked Abbie and Julie for help because she wants Jamie to be happier than she is, and he says he thought they were doing fine already. The two make up and return to Santa Barbara on their own, and Dorothea talks openly about her feelings and dreams for the first time.

An epilogue reveals that Julie goes on the pill, attends NYU, loses touch with Jamie and Dorothea, falls in love, moves to Paris, and chooses not to have children. Abbie stays in Santa Barbara, sets up a photography studio in her garage, marries, and has two sons. William lives with Dorothea for another year, moves to Sedona, opens a pottery store, and gets married and divorced before settling down with another woman. Dorothea meets a man in 1983 and stays with him until her death from metastatic lung cancer in 1999. Years after her death, Jamie marries and has a son to whom he unsuccessfully tries to describe Dorothea.

== Cast ==
- Annette Bening as Dorothea Fields
- Elle Fanning as Julie Hamlin
- Greta Gerwig as Abbie Porter
- Billy Crudup as William
- Lucas Jade Zumann as Jamie Fields
  - Vitaly A. LeBeau as young Jamie
- Alison Elliott as Julie's mom
- Thea Gill as Gail, Abbie's mom
- Olivia Hone as Julie's sister
- Waleed Zuaiter as Charlie, Dorothea's coworker
- Curran Walters as Matt, a skateboarder who beats up Jamie
- Darrell Britt-Gibson as Julian, one of Abbie's acquaintances
- Alia Shawkat as Trish, one of Abbie's acquaintances
- Nathalie Love as Cindy, a woman who sleeps with William
- John Billingsley as Abbie's OBGYN, Dr. Jones
- Gareth Williams as Fire Chief
- Kai Lennox as Reporter/Abbie's future husband, Dave
- Finnegan Seeker Bell as Brian

== Production ==
=== Development ===
The character of Jamie reflects Mills's experiences, and Dorothea and Abbie were inspired by Mills's mother and older sister. Mills based Julie based on the experiences of several of his friends. He said: "It felt like I was raised by my mom and sisters, so I was always appealing to women in the punk scene or women in my world. I always leaned to them to figure out my life as a straight white guy. So I wanted to make a movie about that." Mills called the film a "love letter" to the women who raised him and said: "With all these characters, what guides me is the real person. Of course, I'm cinematizing real people, and you can never get them right or show all of their dimensions, but that's very much what my mom was like." After finishing the script, Mills brought it to Annapurna Pictures, which, liking Mills's previous film, Beginners, agreed to produce 20th Century Women.

=== Casting ===
In May 2015, Annette Bening, Greta Gerwig, and Elle Fanning joined the cast. On August 3, 2015, Billy Crudup was cast in a supporting role.

While preparing for her role in the film, Bening watched films Mills's mother loved and had extensive talks with Mills about his mom. Gerwig prepared by taking photography lessons, listening to records, reading books, and watching films, and also spoke with Mills's sister, on whom her character is based. Fanning was given The Road Less Traveled by M. Scott Peck to help her prepare.

=== Filming ===
Principal photography on the film began on September 8, 2015, in Southern California, and concluded on October 27. The film was shot over 35 days, mainly in Los Angeles, with exteriors shot in Santa Barbara. At one point, a stray tuxedo cat wandered onto the set, and Mills decided to include him in some scenes.

=== Music ===
Roger Neill composed the soundtrack, and the following songs are heard in the film:

- "Don't Worry About the Government" – Talking Heads
- "(White Man) In Hammersmith Palais" – The Clash
- "This Heart of Mine" – Fred Astaire
- "In a Sentimental Mood" – Benny Goodman and His Orchestra
- "Fairytale in the Supermarket" – The Raincoats
- "As Time Goes By" – Rudy Vallee
- "I've Had It" – Black Flag
- "Media Blitz" – The Germs
- "Drugs" – Talking Heads
- "Chant D'Amour" – Lars Clutterham
- "Love in a Void" – Siouxsie and the Banshees
- "Basin Street Blues" – Louis Armstrong and His Hot Five
- "Cheree" – Suicide
- "Gut Feeling / (Slap Your Mammy)" – Devo
- "Vag Punch" – Phlask
- "D.J." – David Bowie
- "Lila Engel (Lilac Angel)" – Neu!
- "The Big Country" – Talking Heads
- "So Blue Love" – Brick Fleagle
- "Nervous Breakdown" – Black Flag
- "After Hours on Dream Street" – Sandy Williams
- "Why Can't I Touch It" – Buzzcocks

== Release ==
In June 2016, A24 acquired the U.S. distribution rights to the film. It had its world premiere on October 8, 2016, as the Centerpiece film of the New York Film Festival, and it screened at AFI Fest on November 16. The film's limited release was scheduled to begin on December 25, but was delayed to December 28.

== Reception ==
=== Box office ===
20th Century Women entered wide release in the U.S. on January 20, 2017. It grossed $1,385,336 that weekend, ranking 17th at the box office. The film went on to earn a total of $5.7 million domestically and $3.7 million in international markets, for a worldwide box office total of $9.4 million.

=== Critical response ===
On the review aggregator website Rotten Tomatoes, 88% of 230 critics' reviews are positive, with an average rating of 7.8/10. The website's consensus reads: "20th Century Women offers Annette Bening a too-rare opportunity to shine in a leading role—and marks another assured step forward for writer-director Mike Mills." Metacritic, which uses a weighted average, assigned the film a score of 83 out of 100, based on 40 critics, indicating "universal acclaim".

Owen Gleiberman of Variety gave the film a positive review, writing: "The best thing about the movie is Bening's performance as Dorothea Fields, who's portrayed as a very particular kind of contradictory free spirit. Divorced and proud, with a lot of heart and soul but even more over-sharing flakiness". David Rooney of The Hollywood Reporter also gave the film a positive review, writing: "Mills uses some of the same devices as Beginners to illuminate his characters' cultural formation, notably historic montages of their birth years or backgrounds prior to coming together. And he also glances ahead to their future lives, after the arc of the movie. But the quilting is more seamless here because the eccentricities are so integral to the writing and performances."

The Writers Guild Foundation listed the script as one of the best of the 2010s, calling the film "an excellent study in character development. The script uses narrated flashbacks to tell each main character's unique story, bringing us further into their world and allowing us to care more deeply about them. This different take on exposition makes us think about how we hold onto key facts and images that we know about certain people".
