= Collective for Living Cinema =

- Address: 52 White Street; Lower Manhattan; United States
- Type: Revival house
- Event: Avant-garde cinema

Construction
- Opened: 1973
- Closed: 1991

The Collective for Living Cinema was revival house for avant-garde cinema located on 52 White Street in Lower Manhattan in the United States.

It regularly presented work by filmmakers such as Ken Jacobs, Nick Zedd, Johan van der Keuken, Yvonne Rainer, Christine Vachon, Dziga Vertov, and many others who created films that were outside of the commercial mainstream in the United States. It also published a number of scholarly journals on film. Many of the founders studied film at Binghamton University together, where they developed a particular interest in the avant-garde.

== Formation ==
In 1973 a group of film students from the Binghamton University Cinema Department looking to create a contemporary and fertile context for their work found The Collective for Living Cinema, an artist-run cooperative that would serve both as an exhibition venue and a center for production and discourse. Above the first program note was a miniature manifesto stating their intention to "overcome the economic, social and political burdens of an art in chains." Lasting for 19 years, The Collective came to embody the under-defined moment between the canonized generation of "the essential cinema" and the transfiguration of film as "new media" embraced by the institutional hierarchy of the art world and subject to the theoretical, critical and economic tidal forces therein. Run as a multi-disciplinary venue, The Collective continuously engaged in a recovery of the recent past, championing the marginal and positing alternative film histories. The screening room was seen as a workshop in which this culture became immersed in its own brand of cinematic delirium. Annette Michelson pointed out that The Collective "attempted to break down distinctions between industrial film and avant garde film, between films that form part of a classical canon and those which are on the margins or periphery of canonical taste." By "maintaining and constantly questioning an exploratory attitude rather than by embalming predigested classical canon", Michelson stated, The Collective emerged in the 1980s as the "liveliest" New York film venue of its time.

== Relocation ==
In the late 1980s, the Collective was forced to move from its 52 White Street location (due to legal and financial issues related to the building's certificate of occupancy and the NYC building codes for motion picture theaters) to a new space across the street. With rising costs and the gentrification of TriBeCa, and reductions in funding from the then-beleaguered National Endowment for the Arts and the New York State Council on the Arts, the Collective closed its doors in 1991, transferring much of its material to Anthology Film Archives. The last home of the Collective, at 41 White Street, was for some time The Flea Theater before they moved to their current location.

== Members ==
Original founders included Ken Ross, Philip Weisman, Lushe Sacker, Mark Graff, Andrea Graff. Many people affiliated with the Collective for Living Cinema were or have gone on to be quite influential in media, such the late Alf Bold, the former programmer of the Arsenal Kino in Berlin, Judith Shulevitz, the columnist for The New York Times and Slate, and John Sloss, the attorney and film producer who has produced more than 40 films, including Far From Heaven, Before Sunset, Personal Velocity, and The Fog of War. Others are noted artists such as the filmmaker Lizzie Borden, who taught film editing at the Collective. In the late 1980s, Jack Walsh served as director. In its final years, Mark McElhatten was curator, Nancy Graham director, and Michael Andres administrator. Board members included Yvonne Rainer, John Sloss, Ira Deutchman, Richard Peña, Arthur Jafa, and Mary Filippo, among others.
