= Ephraim Asili =

American director and filmmaker

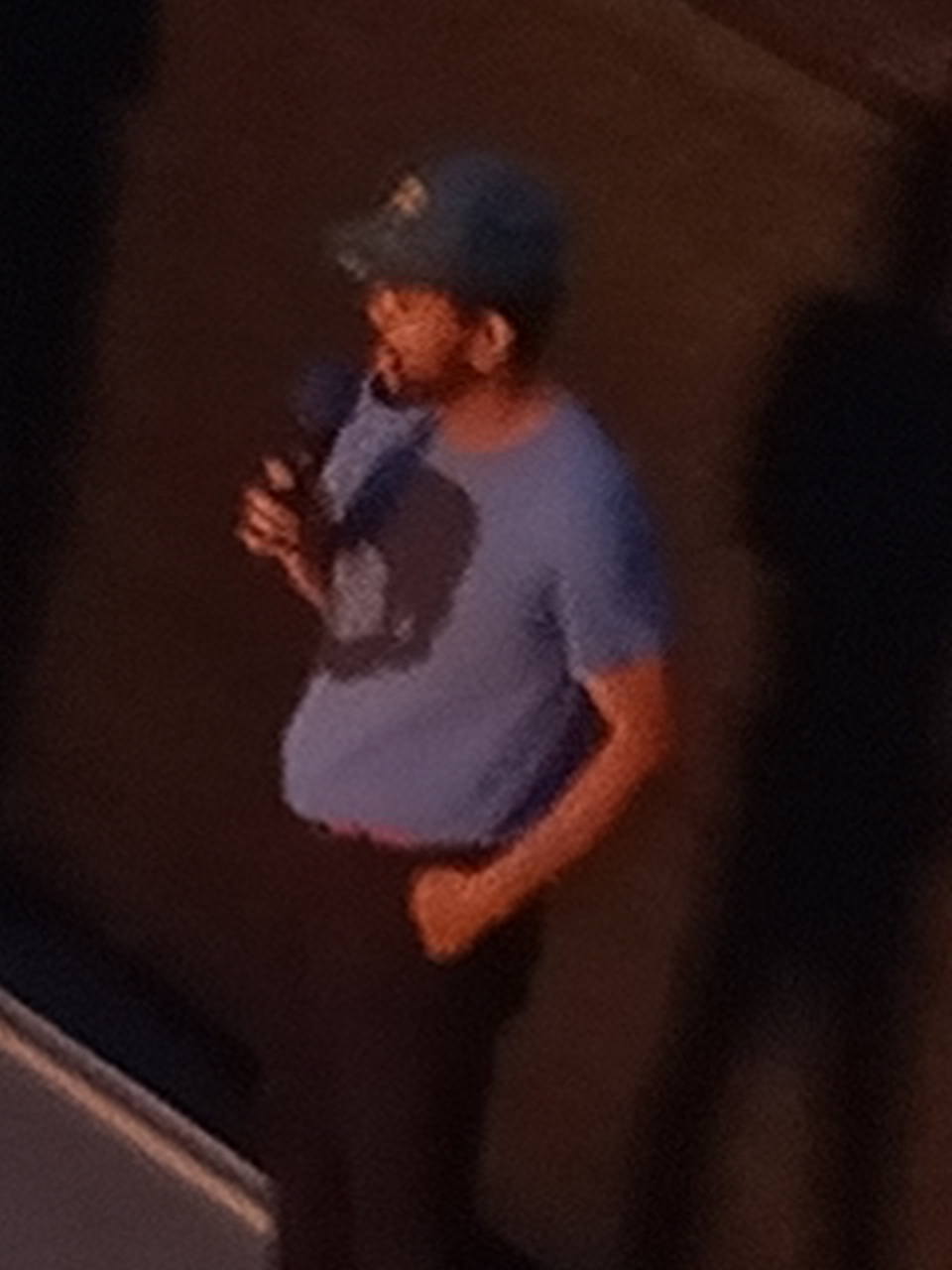
- Asili at the 2021 Berlin International Film Festival
- Education: Temple University (film studies); Bard College (graduate studies)
- Occupation: Filmmaker
- Years active: 2009–present
- Known for: The Diaspora Suite, The Inheritance
- Awards: Guggenheim Fellowship (2021)

Ephraim Asili is an American filmmaker.

== Biography ==
Asili grew up in Roslyn, Pennsylvania. He became involved with MOVE and took interest in filmmaking after the production of a 2004 documentary about the organization. He studied film at Temple University and attended Bard College for his graduate studies.

Asili's 2009 film Points on a Space Age is a documentary about Sun Ra and the Sun Ra Arkestra.

Asili made the five-part film series The Diaspora Suite exploring different aspects of the African diaspora, both within the U.S. and internationally. Forged Ways (2011) includes footage shot in Ethiopia, along with scenes set in Harlem following a protagonist played by Julian Rozzell Jr. Rozzell reappears in American Hunger (2013), which features footage from Philadelphia and Ocean City in the U.S. and Cape Coast and Accra in Ghana. Many Thousands Gone (2014), named after an essay by James Baldwin, was filmed in Harlem and Salvador, Brazil, with an improvised jazz score by Joe McPhee. Kindah (2016), filmed in Hudson, New York and Accompong, Jamaica, features a score by Asili of percussion and wind instruments. The final film Fluid Frontiers (2017) was shot on both sides of the Detroit River, in Detroit, Michigan and Windsor, Ontario. Asili includes recitations of poetry published by Broadside Press, a Detroit-based independent press.

Asili directed the 2020 narrative feature film The Inheritance, which stars Eric Lockley as a young man who inherits a house and uses it to start a collective. The film's plot and highly stylized set design were inspired by Jean-Luc Godard's La Chinoise. It was shot on 16 mm film and includes archival footage of political speeches. The interior scenes were shot at the Experimental Media and Performing Arts Center at Rensselaer Polytechnic Institute, and exteriors were filmed in West Philadelphia. The film includes discussions of the history of MOVE, including the 1985 police bombing of MOVE. Asili was awarded a Guggenheim Fellowship in 2021.
