= Dennis Lim (film curator) =

Film critic

Lim at the 2026 New York Film Festival

Dennis Lim (born 1973) is a New York-based film curator. He has served as the artistic director of the New York Film Festival, since 2020.

== Biography ==
Lim was born in Malaysia in 1973.

Lim worked as an editor of The Village Voice’s film section. He joined Lincoln Center in 2013 and served as director of film programming until 2022. He has been leading the New York Film Festival since 2020.

He has written a book about the work of South Korean filmmaker Hong Sang-soo, which was published in 2022, and a book on David Lynch, published in 2015.

== Personal life ==
Lim lives in Brooklyn's Clinton Hill neighborhood.
