= Scott MacDonald (media scholar) =

American media scholar (born 1942)

- Born: 1942 (age 83–84)
- Spouse: Patricia O’Connor
- Awards: Academy Scholar (2012), National Endowment for the Humanities Fellowship (2004)

Academic background
- Education: University of Florida (PhD), DePauw University (BA)
- Thesis: Narrative Perspective in the Short Stories of Ernest Hemingway (1970)
- Doctoral advisor: Peter Lisca

Academic work
- Institutions: Hamilton College
- Main interests: theory of film
- Website: https://scottmacdonaldcinema.com

Scott MacDonald (born 1942) is an American media scholar and Professor of Cinema and Media Studies at Hamilton College. He is known for his works on theory of film and cinema. In 2012, MacDonald was named an Academy Scholar by the Academy of Motion Pictures Arts and Sciences.

== Books ==
- Avant-Doc: Intersections of Documentary and Avant-Garde Cinema. New York: Oxford University Press, 2015
- American Ethnographic Film and Personal Documentary: The Cambridge Turn. Berkeley: University of California Press, 2013
- Adventures of Perception: Cinema as Exploration (Interviews/Essays). Berkeley: University of California Press, 2009
- Canyon Cinema: The Life and Times of an Independent Film Distributor. Berkeley: University of California Press, 2008
- Cinema 16: Documents Toward a History of the Film Society. Temple University Press, 2002
- A Critical Cinema 5: Interviews with Independent Filmmakers. Berkeley: University of California Press, 2005
