= New York Film Festival =

Annual film festival in New York City, U.S.

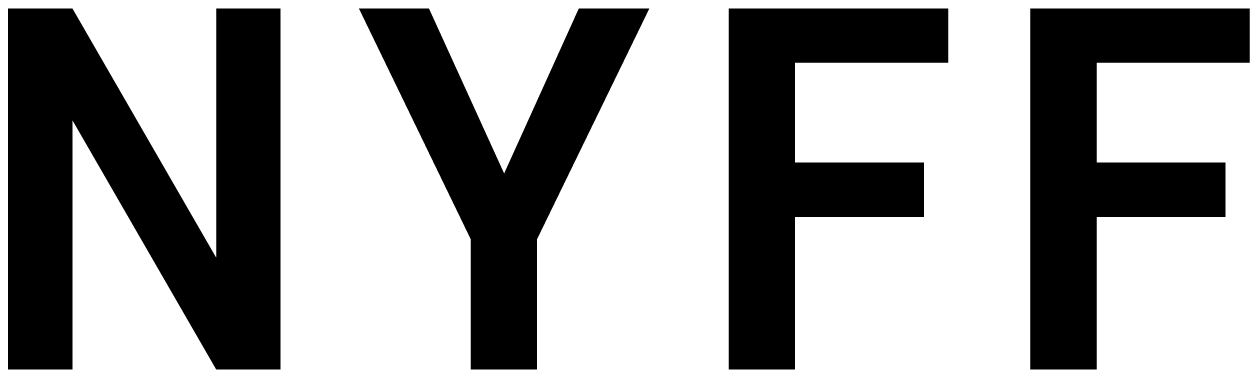
- Location: New York City, United States
- Founded: 1963; 63 years ago
- Founded by: Richard Roud and Amos Vogel
- Hosted by: Film at Lincoln Center
- Website: filmlinc.org/nyff

Latest: 2026
- 2027 2025

The New York Film Festival (NYFF) is an annual film festival held in New York City, presented by Film at Lincoln Center. Founded in 1963 by Richard Roud and Amos Vogel with the support of Lincoln Center president William Schuman, NYFF is one of the longest-running and most prestigious film festivals in the United States.

NYFF is usually centered on the non-competitive "Main Slate" section, which typically features 20 to 30 films, with additional sections for short films, experimental works, retrospectives and restorations. The current Artistic Director of the festival is Dennis Lim.

== History ==
=== Founding the festival ===
Newly appointed Lincoln Center President William Schuman visited the British Film Institute in 1962 for advice on establishing a film festival. He recruited the London Film Festival's director Richard Roud as the NYFF's first programmer, after James Quinn, the BFI director, agreed that the festivals could be run in tandem. Boston-born Roud was 33 years old at the time and based in London where he also worked as a film critic for The Guardian. Though Roud maintained his home base in London, he recruited Amos Vogel of the legendary Cinema 16 film club as his New York–based co-programmer. The first edition of the festival opened on September 10, 1963, with Luis Buñuel's The Exterminating Angel and closed on September 19. It was a success and almost all screenings nearly sold out. The festival also included films screened at the Museum of Modern Art that had not been shown in the United States previously, including Akira Kurosawa's I Live in Fear and Point of Order. In 1966, Roud and Vogel formed the festival's first selection committee, consisting of Arthur Knight and Andrew Sarris; Susan Sontag was added the next year. Richard Corliss later became part of the committee. Vogel resigned from his position as Festival Director in 1968. In 1976, US Customs wouldn't allow the premiere of In the Realm of the Senses. In 1985, Roman Catholics demonstrated against the showing of Jean-Luc Godard's Hail Mary. Though Roud was previously designated Program Director, he presided over the festival from 1969 to 1987. Roud became seriously ill in June 1987 but directed the 1987 festival, which was a success, however, he was later ordered to resign by Lincoln Film Society president Alfred Stern and executive director Joanna Koch after reports of 'interpersonal problems' and disagreements over appointing members of the committee. Committee member David Denby believed that Koch wanted more power after the committee turned down her push to include The Whales of August and Intervista in the festival and also to appoint Wendy Keys on the select committee. Several of the committee resigned following Roud's departure, including Corliss.

Roud's 25 years of running the festival were characterized by a focus on the European art cinema of the postwar years and the rise of auteurism.

=== 1990s–2010s ===
Richard Peña, then 34, took over as lead programmer in 1988, with Roud becoming European consultant to the festival. The Queens native was already an accomplished film historian, academic, and programmer. Prior to his work with NYFF, he worked at the Film Center of the School of the Art Institute of Chicago. Peña came to NYFF as a seasoned festival-goer who held Roud in high esteem. During his stint as programmer (which also lasted 25 years), Peña honored the festival's traditions and unique character – retaining the selection committee process, the non-competitive format, the post-screening director Q&As, and the festival's strict selectivity – while also working to expand NYFF's somewhat Eurocentric focus. Filmmakers like Hou Hsiao-hsien, Manoel de Oliveira, Leos Carax, Raúl Ruiz, and Krzysztof Kieślowski were introduced to NYFF audiences during the Roud era, and became regulars under Peña. After 25 years as Program Director and head of the NYFF selection committee, Peña led his final year at NYFF in 2012, during the festival's 50th presentation.

=== 2010s–present ===
After Richard Peña's departure, Robert Koehler briefly took over year-round programming duties, while Kent Jones, who left the Film Society of Lincoln Center in 2009 to serve as Executive Director of the World Cinema Foundation, returned to lead NYFF from 2013 to 2019. Jones began his programming career at Film Forum and the Rotterdam Film Festival, before joining The Film Society of Lincoln Center in 1998 as Associate Director of Programming and a member of the NYFF programming committee. The current Artistic Director of the festival is Dennis Lim, who was appointed in 2022.

== Current sections ==
As of 2026, the festival program is divided into the following sections:

=== Main Slate ===
The Main Slate is the Festival's primary section, a program typically featuring 25–30 feature-length films, intending to reflect the current state of cinema. The program is a mix of major international art house films from the festival circuit, new discoveries, and studio releases targeting awards season. The studio films are often selected as Opening Night, Centerpiece, and Closing Night presentations.

=== Currents ===
Currents complements the Main Slate, tracing a more complete picture of contemporary cinema with an emphasis on new and innovative forms and voices. This section is the only one at the festival which presents short films.

The selection team of Currents section consists of Dennis Lim (Chair), Aily Nash (is also Head of shorts programming), Rachael Rakes, and Tyler Wilson (is also Head of shorts programming).

=== Spotlight ===
Spotlight is showcase of the season's most anticipated and significant films.

=== Revivals ===
The Revivals section showcases important works from renowned filmmakers that have been digitally remastered, restored, and preserved with the assistance of generous partners.

=== Talks ===
Talks features in-depth conversations with filmmakers, critics, curators, and more.

== Gala selections ==
=== 1960s ===
Year	Opening Night	Closing Night
1963	The Exterminating Angel (Luis Buñuel)	Sweet and Sour (Jacques Baratier)
1964	Hamlet (Grigori Kozintsev)	The Big City (Satyajit Ray)
1965	Alphaville (Jean-Luc Godard)	Red Beard (Akira Kurosawa)
1966	Loves of a Blonde (Milos Forman)	The War Is Over (Alain Resnais)
1967	The Battle of Algiers (Gillo Pontecorvo)	Far from Vietnam (various)
1968	Capricious Summer (Jiří Menzel)	The Fireman's Ball (Miloš Forman)
1969	Bob & Carol & Ted & Alice (Paul Mazursky)	Oh! What a Lovely War (Richard Attenborough)

=== 1970s ===
Year	Opening Night	Closing Night
1970	The Wild Child (François Truffaut)	Tristana (Luis Buñuel)
1971	The Beginning (Gleb Panfilov)	Murmur of the Heart (Louis Malle)
1972	Chloe in the Afternoon (Éric Rohmer)	Last Tango in Paris (Bernardo Bertolucci)
1973	Day for Night (François Truffaut)	Badlands (Terrence Malick)
1974	Don't Cry with Your Mouth Full (Pascal Thomas)	The Phantom of Liberty (Luis Buñuel)
1975	Conversation Piece (Luchino Visconti)	The Story of Adèle H. (François Truffaut)
1976	Small Change (François Truffaut)	The Marquise of O (Éric Rohmer)
1977	One Sings, the Other Doesn't (Agnès Varda)	That Obscure Object of Desire (Luis Buñuel)
1978	A Wedding (Robert Altman)	Violette Nozière (Claude Chabrol)
1979	Luna (Bernardo Bertolucci)	The Marriage of Maria Braun (Rainer Werner Fassbinder)

=== 1980s ===
Year	Opening Night	Closing Night
1980	Melvin and Howard (Jonathan Demme)	The Last Metro (François Truffaut)
1981	Chariots of Fire (Hugh Hudson)	Man of Iron (Andrzej Wajda)
1982	Veronika Voss (Rainer Werner Fassbinder)	Fitzcarraldo (Werner Herzog)
1983	The Big Chill (Lawrence Kasdan)	Streamers (Robert Altman)
1984	Country (Richard Pearce)	Paris Texas (Wim Wenders)
1985	Ran (Akira Kurosawa)	Kaos (Paolo Taviani, Vittorio Taviani)
1986	Down by Law (Jim Jarmusch)	Peggy Sue Got Married (Francis Ford Coppola)
1987	Dark Eyes (Nikita Mikhalkov)	House of Games (David Mamet)
1988	Women on the Verge of a Nervous Breakdown (Pedro Almodóvar)	Red Sorghum (Zhang Yimou)
1989	Too Beautiful for You (Bertrand Blier)	Breaking In (Bill Forsyth)

=== 1990s ===
Year	Opening Night	Centerpiece	Closing Night
1990	Miller's Crossing (Joel Coen)	—N/a	The Nasty Girl (Michael Verhoeven)
1991	The Double Life of Veronique (Krzysztof Kieślowski)	—N/a	Homicide (David Mamet)
1992	Olivier, Olivier (Agnieszka Holland)	—N/a	Night and the City (Irwin Winkler)
1993	Short Cuts (Robert Altman)	—N/a	The Piano (Jane Campion)
1994	Pulp Fiction (Quentin Tarantino)	Bullets Over Broadway (Woody Allen)	Hoop Dreams (Steve James)
1995	Shanghai Triad (Zhang Yimou)	Strange Days (Kathryn Bigelow)	Carrington (Christopher Hampton)
1996	Secrets & Lies (Mike Leigh)	Thieves (André Téchiné)	The People vs. Larry Flynt (Miloš Forman)
1997	The Ice Storm (Ang Lee)	The Sweet Hereafter (Atom Egoyan)	Live Flesh (Pedro Almodóvar)
1998	Celebrity (Woody Allen)	Black Cat, White Cat (Emir Kusturica)	The Dreamlife of Angels (Erick Zonca)
1999	All About My Mother (Pedro Almodóvar)	Topsy-Turvy (Mike Leigh)	Felicia's Journey (Atom Egoyan)

=== 2000s ===
Year	Opening Night	Centerpiece	Closing Night
2000	Dancer in the Dark (Lars von Trier)	Pollock (Ed Harris)	Crouching Tiger, Hidden Dragon (Ang Lee)
2001	Va savoir (Jacques Rivette)	Mulholland Drive (David Lynch)	In Praise of Love (Jean-Luc Godard)
2002	About Schmidt (Alexander Payne)	Punch-Drunk Love (Paul Thomas Anderson)	Talk to Her (Pedro Almodóvar)
2003	Mystic River (Clint Eastwood)	The Fog of War (Errol Morris)	21 Grams (Alejandro G. Iñárritu)
2004	Look at Me (Agnès Jaoui)	Bad Education (Pedro Almodóvar)	Sideways (Alexander Payne)
2005	Good Night, and Good Luck (George Clooney)	Breakfast on Pluto (Neil Jordan)	Caché (Michael Haneke)
2006	The Queen (Stephen Frears)	Volver (Pedro Almodóvar)	Pan's Labyrinth (Guillermo del Toro)
2007	The Darjeeling Limited (Wes Anderson)	No Country for Old Men (Joel Coen, Ethan Coen)	Persepolis (Marjane Satrapi, Vincent Paronnaud)
2008	The Class (Laurent Cantet)	Changeling (Clint Eastwood)	The Wrestler (Darren Aronofsky)
2009	Wild Grass (Alain Resnais)	Precious (Lee Daniels)	Broken Embraces (Pedro Almodóvar)

=== 2010s ===
Year	Opening Night	Centerpiece	Closing Night
2010	The Social Network (David Fincher)	The Tempest (Julie Taymor)	Hereafter (Clint Eastwood)
2011	Carnage (Roman Polanski)	My Week with Marilyn (Simon Curtis)	The Descendants (Alexander Payne)
2012	Life of Pi (Ang Lee)	Not Fade Away (David Chase)	Flight (Robert Zemeckis)
2013	Captain Phillips (Paul Greengrass)	The Secret Life of Walter Mitty (Ben Stiller)	Her (Spike Jonze)
2014	Gone Girl (David Fincher)	Inherent Vice (Paul Thomas Anderson)	Birdman (Alejandro G. Iñárritu)
2015	The Walk (Robert Zemeckis)	Steve Jobs (Danny Boyle)	Miles Ahead (Don Cheadle)
2016	13th (Ava DuVernay)	20th Century Women (Mike Mills)	The Lost City of Z (James Gray)
2017	Last Flag Flying (Richard Linklater)	Wonderstruck (Todd Haynes)	Wonder Wheel (Woody Allen)
2018	The Favourite (Yorgos Lanthimos)	Roma (Alfonso Cuarón)	At Eternity's Gate (Julian Schnabel)
2019	The Irishman (Martin Scorsese)	Marriage Story (Noah Baumbach)	Motherless Brooklyn (Edward Norton)

=== 2020s ===
Year	Opening Night	Centerpiece	Closing Night
2020	Lovers Rock (Steve McQueen)	Nomadland (Chloé Zhao)	French Exit (Azazel Jacobs)
2021	The Tragedy of Macbeth (Joel Coen)	The Power of the Dog (Jane Campion)	Parallel Mothers (Pedro Almodóvar)
2022	White Noise (Noah Baumbach)	All the Beauty and the Bloodshed (Laura Poitras)	The Inspection (Elegance Bratton)
2023	May December (Todd Haynes)	Priscilla (Sofia Coppola)	Ferrari (Michael Mann)
2024	Nickel Boys (RaMell Ross)	The Room Next Door (Pedro Almodóvar)	Blitz (Steve McQueen)
2025	After the Hunt (Luca Guadagnino)	Father Mother Sister Brother (Jim Jarmusch)	Is This Thing On? (Bradley Cooper)
2026	Paper Tiger (James Gray)	Behemoth! (Tony Gilroy)	14th (Ava DuVernay)

== See also ==
- New York International Children's Film Festival
