= Amy Taubin =

American author and film critic (born 1938)

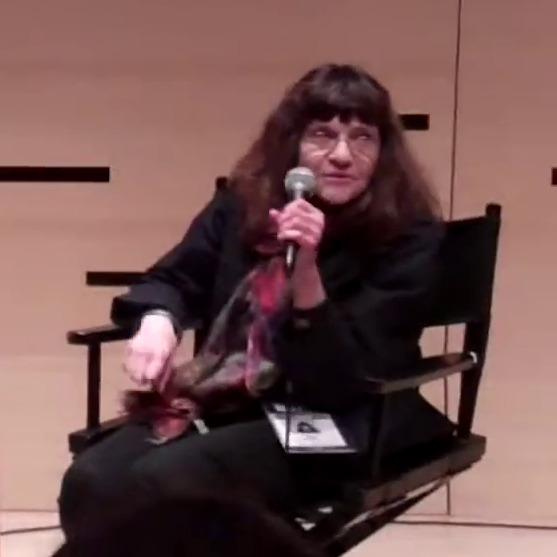
- Amy Taubin in 2015
- Born: September 10, 1938 (age 88)
- Education: New York University
- Occupation: Film critic

Amy Taubin (/ˈtaʊbɪn/; born September 10, 1938) is an American author and film critic. She is a contributing editor for two prominent film magazines, the British Sight & Sound and the American Film Comment. She has also written regularly for the SoHo Weekly News, The Village Voice, The Millennium Film Journal, and Artforum, and used to be curator of video and film at the non-profit experimental performance space The Kitchen.

== Life and career ==
Taubin attended Sarah Lawrence College as an undergrad and received an MA from New York University. Taubin is also a filmmaker, curator, and educator. She is one of the people visible in Michael Snow's experimental film Wavelength.

As an actress, she originated the role of Sandy in the original Broadway production of The Prime of Miss Jean Brodie, opposite Zoe Caldwell, in 1968.

Taubin has served on the board of trustees of the Anthology Film Archives; She was named as a Distinguished Art Historian-Teacher at the New York School of Visual Arts, Department of Humanities and Sciences; and has served on the selection committee for the Film Society of Lincoln Center.

In 2020, Taubin was awarded a writer grant, in the short-form writing category, by the Warhol Foundation. In her statement on receiving the prize, she said she planned to use the funds to survey the "time machine of cinema available on our home screens."

== Selected works ==
=== Books ===
- Ghosts in the Machine, Village Voice, 1998.
- Douglas Gordon: through a looking glass, co-authored with Gagosian Gallery, Hal Hartle and Kay C. Pallister, Gagosian Gallery, 1999.
- Taxi Driver, BFI Publishing, 2nd ed., 2012.
- James Nares, co-authored with Glenn O'Brien and Ed Halter, Rizzoli International, 2014.
- The complete films of Agnès Varda, co-authored Michael Koresky, Ginette Vincendeau, So Mayer, et al., The Criterion Collection, 2020. (The book is part of a 15-disc Blu-Ray collection.)

=== Articles ===
- "So there, Orwell": 1984: a video review, co-authored with John Howell, Louisiana World Exposition, 1984.
- Stands by his man: On Peter Fonda's The Hired Hand, Artform international, October 2003.
- Eastern exposure on recent Asian cinema, Artform international, November 2004.
- Common sense, Film comment, Vol. 52, no. 6, November/December 2016.
