= AARP Movies for Grownups Award for Best TV Series or Limited Series =

Annual US television award

- Awarded for: Best TV Series made by or for people over the age of 50
- Country: United States
- Presented by: AARP
- First award: Succession (2023)
- Most recent winner: The Pitt (2025)
- Website: https://www.aarp.org/entertainment/movies-for-grownups/

The AARP Movies for Grownups Award for Best TV Series or Limited Series is one of the AARP Movies for Grownups Awards presented annually by the AARP. The award honors the best television series in a given year made by or featuring artists over the age of 50.

The first television award given by AARP was titled Best TV Movie, and was given to Hell on Heels: The Battle of Mary Kay in 2003. The category was discontinued after 2006 before returning in 2021 as Best TV Movie/Limited Series alongside three new awards for Best Series, Best Actress, and Best Actor.

Starting with the 23rd AARP Movies for Grownups Awards, the Best TV Series and Best TV Movie/Limited Series categories were retired and combined into Best TV Series or Limited Series.

== Winners and Nominees ==
indicates the winners.

=== 2020s ===
Year	Series	Network
2023 (23rd)	Succession ‡	HBO
2023 (23rd)	The Bear	FX on Hulu
2023 (23rd)	Fargo	FX
2023 (23rd)	Only Murders in the Building	Hulu
2023 (23rd)	The White Lotus	HBO
2024 (24th)	Shōgun ‡	FX
2024 (24th)	The Crown	Netflix
2024 (24th)	Hacks	Max
2024 (24th)	Palm Royale	Apple TV+
2024 (24th)	Slow Horses	Apple TV+
2025 (25th)	The Pitt ‡	HBO Max
2025 (25th)	Adolescence	Netflix
2025 (25th)	Hacks	HBO Max
2025 (25th)	The Studio	Apple TV+
2025 (25th)	The White Lotus	HBO
