= AARP Movies for Grownups Award for Best TV Series =

Retired annual US television award

- Awarded for: Best TV Series made by or for people over the age of 50
- Country: United States
- Presented by: AARP
- First award: This Is Us (2020)
- Final award: The Old Man (2022)
- Website: https://www.aarp.org/entertainment/movies-for-grownups/

The AARP Movies for Grownups Award for Best TV Series was one of the AARP Movies for Grownups Awards presented annually by the AARP. The award honored the best television series in a given year made by or featuring artists over the age of 50.

The first television award given by AARP was titled Best TV Movie, and was given to Hell on Heels: The Battle of Mary Kay in 2003. The category was discontinued after 2006 before returning in 2021 as Best TV Movie/Limited Series alongside three new awards for Best Series, Best Actress, and Best Actor.

Starting with the 23rd AARP Movies for Grownups Awards, the Best TV Series and Best TV Movie/Limited Series categories were retired and combined into Best TV Series or Limited Series.

== Winners and Nominees ==
indicates the winners.

=== 2020s ===
Year	Series	Network
2020–21 (20th)	This Is Us	NBC
2020–21 (20th)	The Crown	Netflix
2020–21 (20th)	Perry Mason	HBO
2020–21 (20th)	Succession	HBO
2020–21 (20th)	Ted Lasso	Apple TV+
2021 (21st)	Ted Lasso	Apple TV+
2021 (21st)	The Chair	Netflix
2021 (21st)	The Crown	Netflix
2021 (21st)	Hacks	HBO Max
2021 (21st)	Succession	HBO
2022 (22nd)	The Old Man	FX
2022 (22nd)	Abbott Elementary	ABC
2022 (22nd)	Only Murders in the Building	Hulu
2022 (22nd)	The White Lotus	HBO
2022 (22nd)	Yellowstone	Paramount Network
