= 21st AARP Movies for Grownups Awards =

Film award ceremony

- Awarded for: Film and television by and about people over 50
- Date: March 18, 2022
- Hosted by: Alan Cumming

Highlights
- Best Film: Belfast
- Most awards: King Richard (2)
- Most nominations: Belfast (7)

Television coverage
- Network: PBS

The 21st AARP Movies for Grownups Awards, presented by AARP the Magazine, honored films and television shows released in 2021 created by and about people over the age of 50. The ceremony hosted by Alan Cumming was held on March 18, 2022, and was broadcast on PBS as part of its Great Performances series. This was Cumming's second time hosting, having also hosted in 2018 in the first year the awards were broadcast on PBS. Nominations were announced on January 11, 2022, in The Hollywood Reporter.

== Awards ==
=== Winners and nominees ===
| Best Movie for Grownups Belfast: King Richard; The Power of the Dog; West Side Story; Being the Ricardos | Best Director Jane Campion - The Power of the Dog: Kenneth Branagh – Belfast; Guillermo del Toro - Nightmare Alley; Steven Spielberg - West Side Story; Denis Villeneuve - Dune |
| Best Actor Will Smith - King Richard: Javier Bardem - Being the Ricardos; Jim Broadbent - The Duke; Peter Dinklage - Cyrano; Denzel Washington - The Tragedy of Macbeth | Best Actress Nicole Kidman - Being the Ricardos: Halle Berry - Bruised; Sandra Bullock - The Unforgivable; Frances McDormand - The Tragedy of Macbeth; Helen Mirren - The Duke |
| Best Supporting Actor Jared Leto - House of Gucci: Ciarán Hinds - Belfast; J.K. Simmons - Being the Ricardos; Timothy Spall - Spencer; David Strathairn - Nightmare Alley | Best Supporting Actress Aunjanue Ellis - King Richard: Cate Blanchett - Nightmare Alley; Judi Dench - Belfast; Marlee Matlin - CODA; Rita Moreno - West Side Story |
| Best Screenwriter Tony Kushner - West Side Story: Paul Thomas Anderson - Licorice Pizza; Kenneth Branagh - Belfast; Jane Campion - The Power of the Dog; Guillermo del Toro, Kim Morgan - Nightmare Alley | Best Ensemble Nightmare Alley: Don't Look Up; The Harder They Fall; House of Gucci; West Side Story |
| Best Intergenerational Film CODA: Belfast; C'mon C'mon; King Richard; The Tender Bar | Best Buddy Picture Finch: The Harder They Fall; Off the Rails; Queen Bees; 12 Mighty Orphans |
| Best Time Capsule Spencer: Being the Ricardos; Belfast; Licorice Pizza; West Side Story | Best Grownup Love Story Cyrano: Belfast; The Duke; The Tragedy of Macbeth; 23 Walks |
| Best Documentary Summer of Soul (...Or, When the Revolution Could Not Be Televised): The Beatles: Get Back; Julia; My Name is Pauli Murray; Who We Are: A Chronicle of Racism in America | Best Foreign Film Sheep Without a Shepherd - China: Drive My Car - Japan; The Hand of God - Italy; There Is No Evil - Iran, Germany; Two of Us - France |
| Best Actor (TV) Michael Keaton - Dopesick: Kevin Costner - Yellowstone; Ewan McGregor - Halston; Billy Porter - POSE; Martin Short - Only Murders in the Building | Best Actress (TV) Jean Smart - Hacks: Gillian Anderson - The Crown; Andie MacDowell - Maid; Sandra Oh - The Chair; Lily Tomlin - Grace and Frankie |
| Best Series Ted Lasso: The Chair; The Crown; Hacks; Succession | Best TV Movie/Limited Series Mare of Easttown: Halston; Maid; Nine Perfect Strangers; The Underground Railroad |

=== Career Achievement Award ===
- Lily Tomlin

=== Films with multiple nominations ===
Films that received multiple nominations
| Nominations | Film |
|---|---|
| 7 | Belfast |
| 6 | West Side Story |
| 5 | Being the Ricardos |
| 5 | Nightmare Alley |
| 4 | King Richard |
| 3 | The Duke |
| 3 | The Power of the Dog |
| 2 | CODA |
| 2 | Cyrano |
| 2 | The Harder They Fall |
| 2 | House of Gucci |
| 2 | Licorice Pizza |
| 2 | Spencer |
| 2 | The Tragedy of Macbeth |

Films that received multiple awards
| Wins | Film |
|---|---|
| 2 | King Richard |
