= 22nd AARP Movies for Grownups Awards =

Film award ceremony

- Awarded for: Film and television by and about people over 50
- Date: January 28, 2023
- Site: Beverly Wilshire Hotel, Los Angeles
- Hosted by: Alan Cumming

Highlights
- Best Film: Top Gun: Maverick
- Most awards: Film: Elvis (2); Television: The Old Man (2)
- Most nominations: The Fabelmans (6)

Television coverage
- Network: PBS

The 22nd AARP Movies for Grownups Awards, presented by AARP: The Magazine, honored films and television series released in 2022. Created by and about people over the age of 50, the ceremony was held on January 28, 2023, at the Beverly Wilshire Hotel in Los Angeles and hosted by Alan Cumming for the third time; the event was broadcast on PBS' Great Performances on February 17, 2023. This was also the first ceremony in four years to not present the Best Buddy Picture category. Nominations were announced on December 15, 2022, with The Fabelmans leading with six nominations. Jamie Lee Curtis received the Career Achievement Award.

== Awards ==
=== Winners and nominees ===
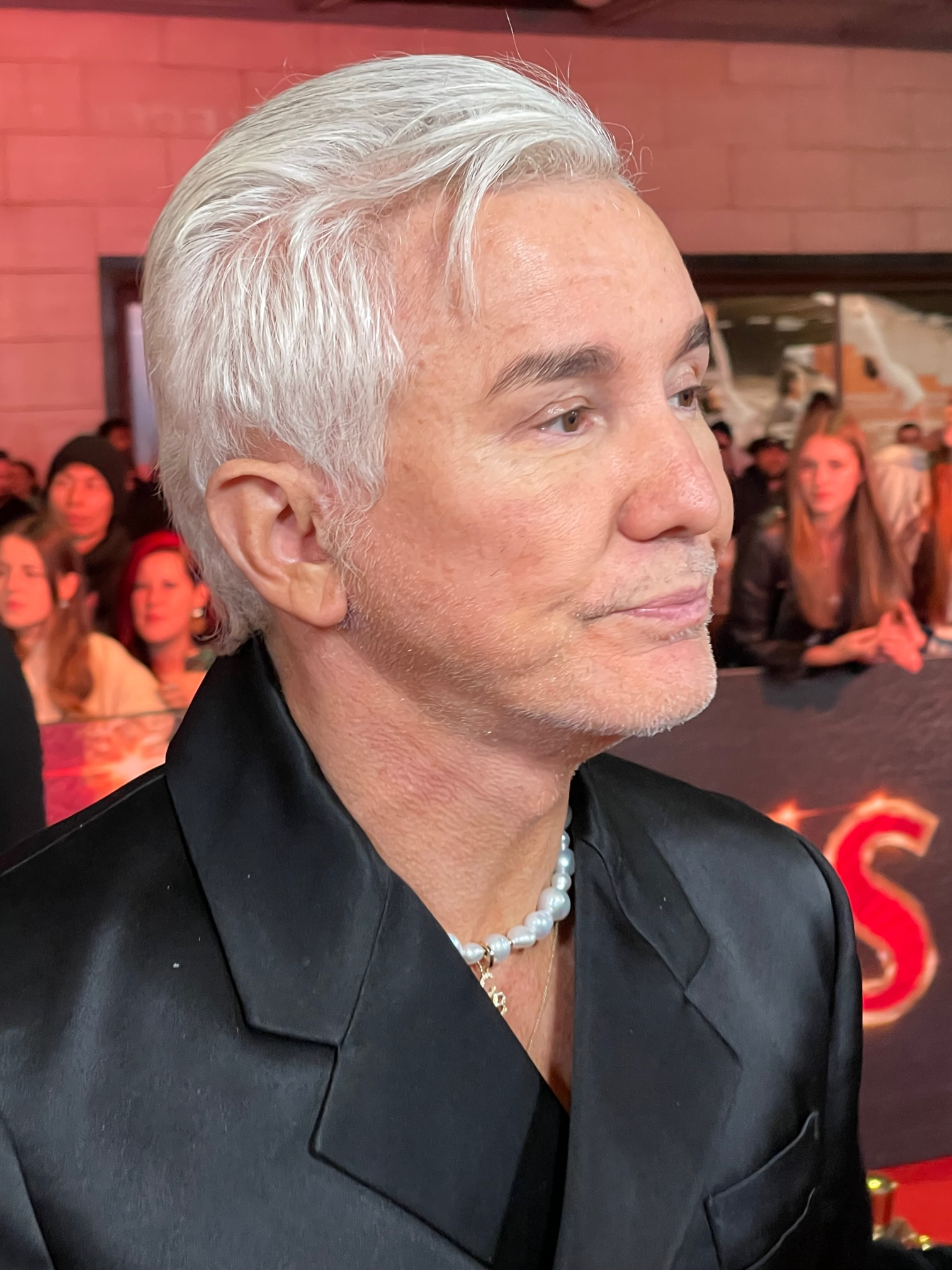
Baz Luhrmann, Best Director winner

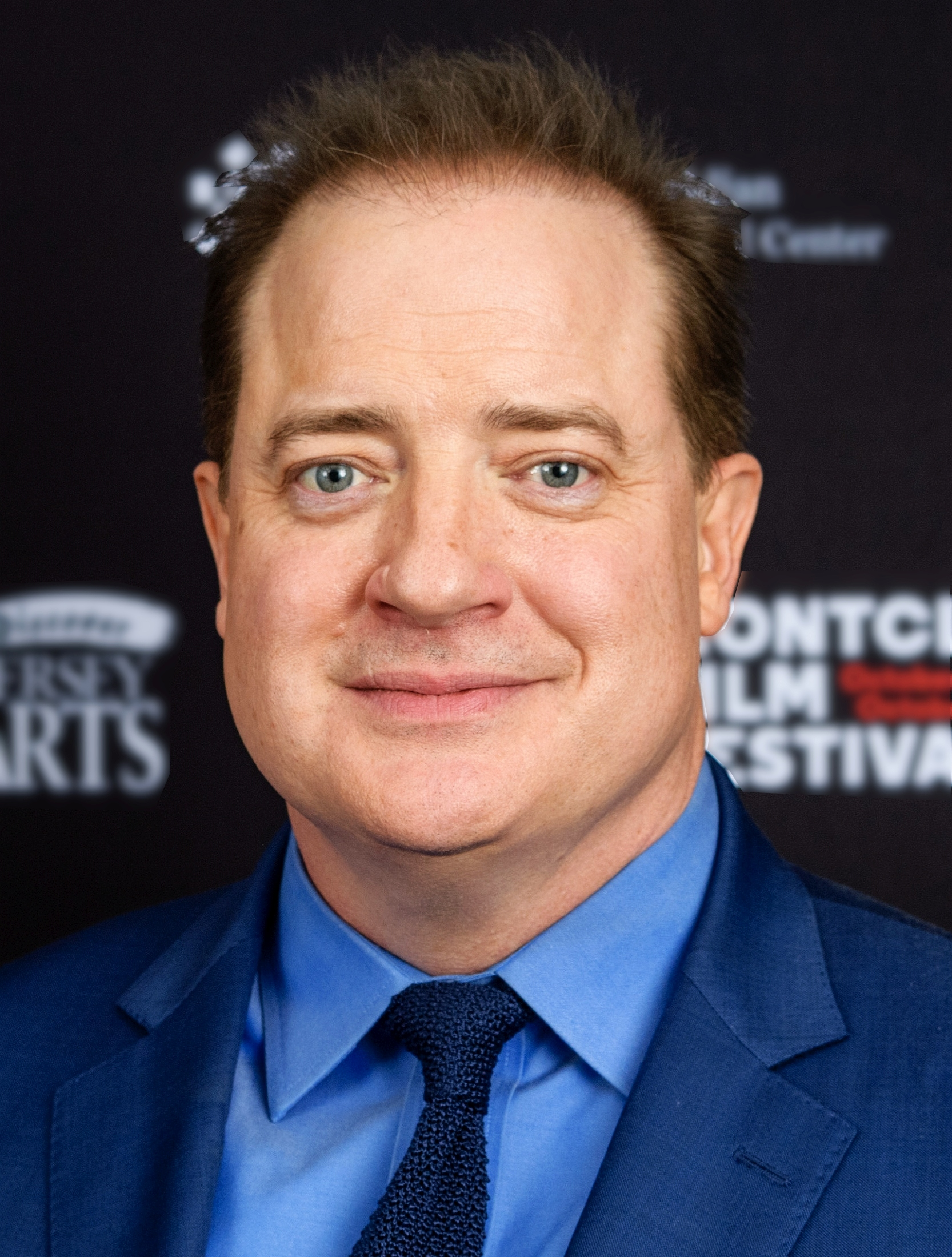
Brendan Fraser, Best Actor winner

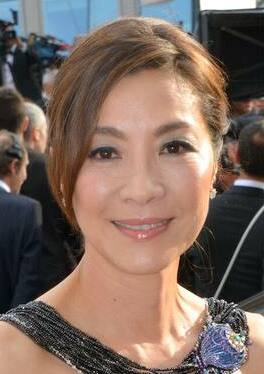
Michelle Yeoh, Best Actress winner

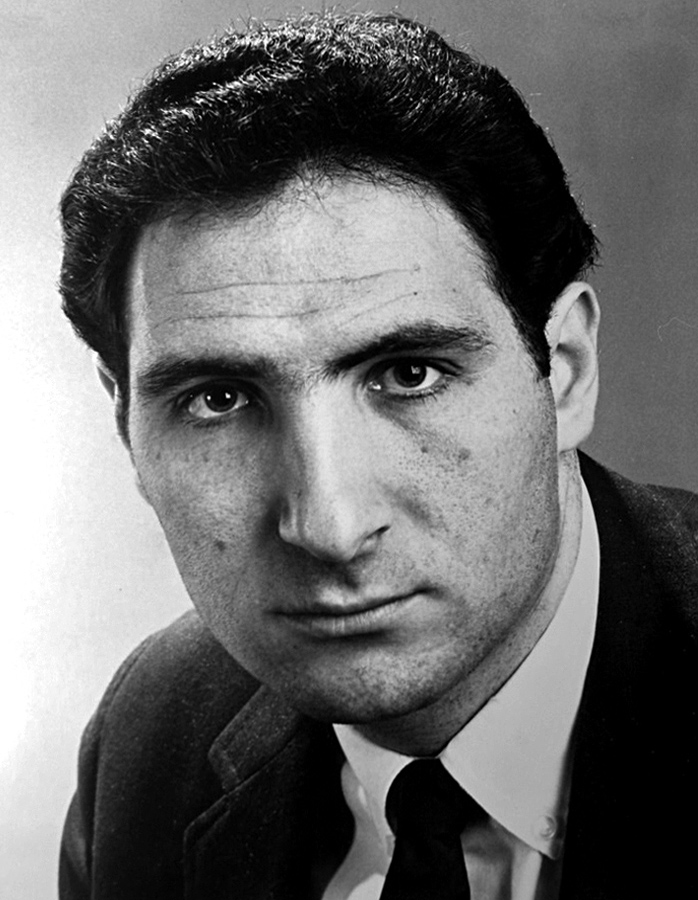
Judd Hirsch, Best Supporting Actor winner

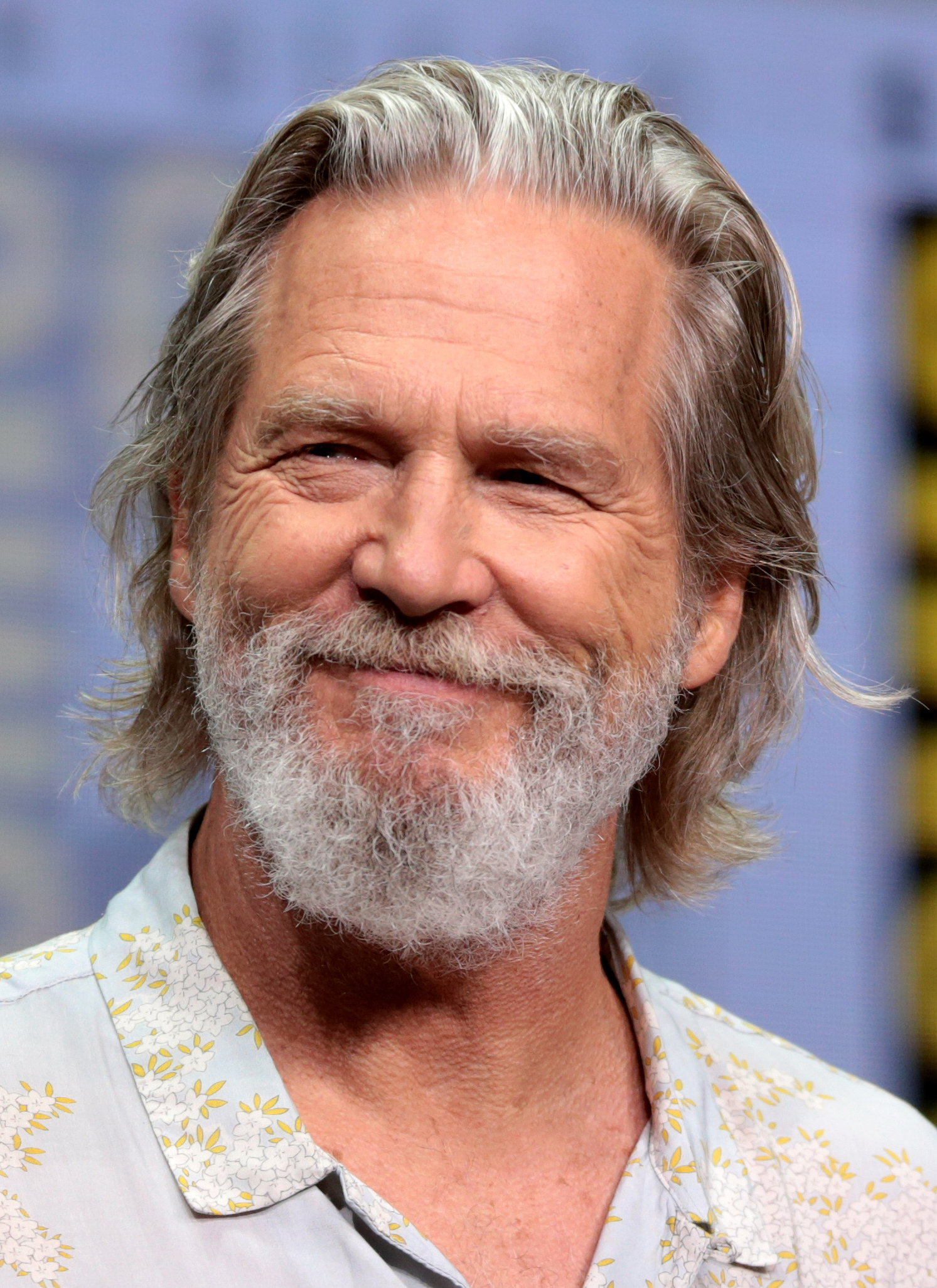
Jeff Bridges, Best Actor (TV) winner

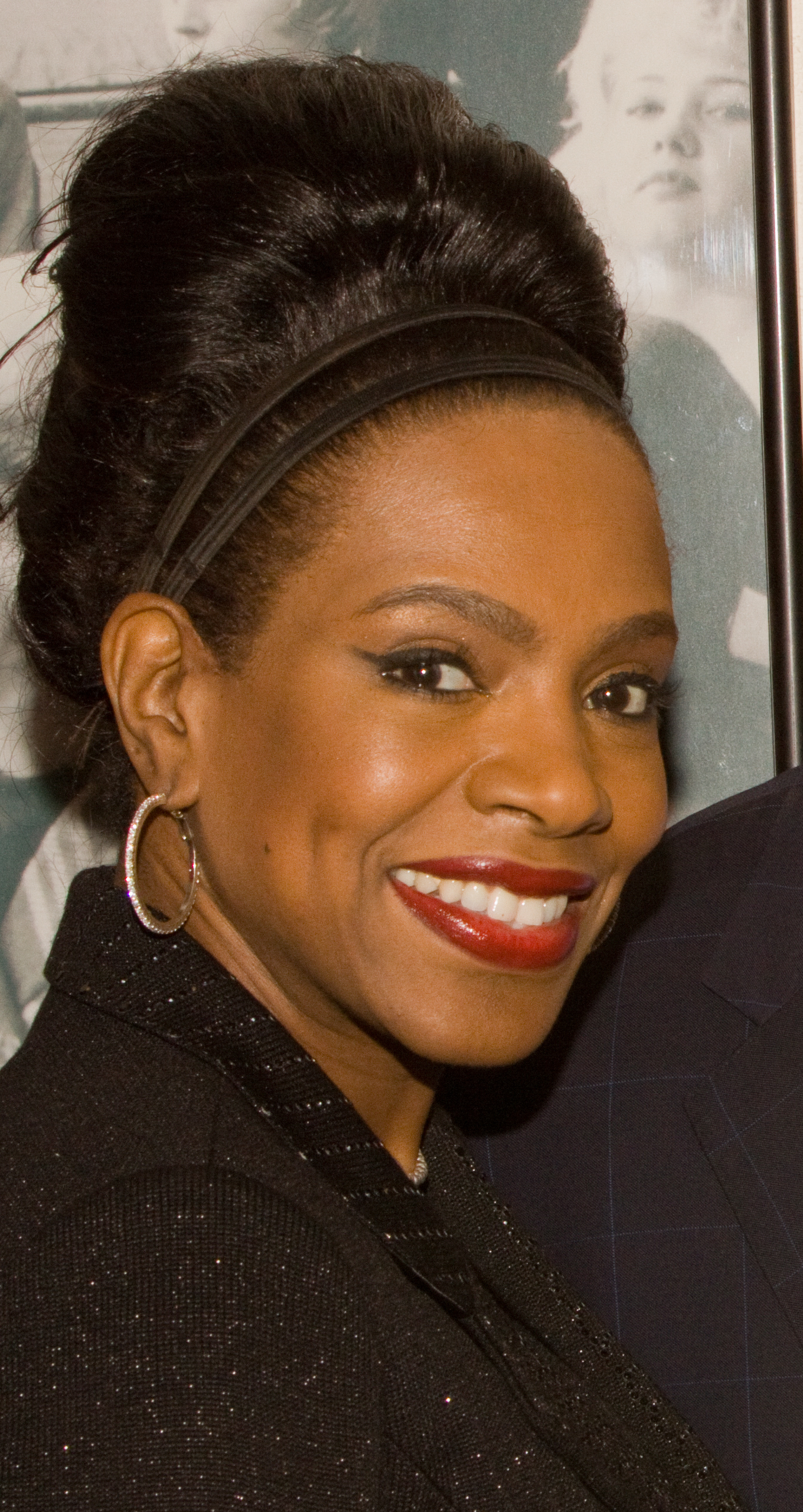
Sheryl Lee Ralph, Best Actress (TV) winner

Winners are listed first and highlighted in boldface.

**Best Picture/Best Movie for Grownups** **Top Gun: Maverick**: Elvis; Everything Everywhere All at Once; The Fabelmans; Tár; The Woman King; Women Talking	**Best Director** **Baz Luhrmann – Elvis**: James Cameron – Avatar: The Way of Water; Todd Field – Tár; Gina Prince-Bythewood – The Woman King; Steven Spielberg – The Fabelmans
**Best Actor** **Brendan Fraser – The Whale**: Tom Cruise – Top Gun: Maverick; Tom Hanks – A Man Called Otto; Bill Nighy – Living; Adam Sandler – Hustle	**Best Actress** **Michelle Yeoh – Everything Everywhere All at Once**: Cate Blanchett – Tár; Viola Davis – The Woman King; Lesley Manville – Mrs. Harris Goes to Paris; Emma Thompson – Good Luck to You, Leo Grande
**Best Supporting Actor** **Judd Hirsch – The Fabelmans**: Andre Braugher – She Said; Brendan Gleeson – The Banshees of Inisherin; Woody Harrelson – Triangle of Sadness; Ke Huy Quan – Everything Everywhere All at Once	**Best Supporting Actress** **Judith Ivey – Women Talking**: Angela Bassett – Black Panther: Wakanda Forever; Patricia Clarkson – She Said; Jamie Lee Curtis – Everything Everywhere All at Once; Gabrielle Union – The Inspection
**Best Screenwriter** **Kazuo Ishiguro – Living**: Todd Field – Tár; Tony Kushner and Steven Spielberg – The Fabelmans; Rebecca Lenkiewicz – She Said; Dana Stevens – The Woman King	**Best Ensemble** **She Said**: Glass Onion: A Knives Out Mystery; Nope; The Woman King; Women Talking
**Best Intergenerational Movie** **Till**: Armageddon Time; Everything Everywhere All at Once; The Fabelmans; A Man Called Otto	**Best Time Capsule** **Elvis**: Armageddon Time; Babylon; The Fabelmans; Till
**Best Grownup Love Story** **Good Luck to You, Leo Grande**: Empire of Light; Lady Chatterley's Lover; A Love Song; Ticket to Paradise	**Best Documentary** **Gabby Giffords Won't Back Down**: Lucy and Desi; The Pez Outlaw; Sidney; Tony Hawk: Until the Wheels Fall Off
**Best Foreign Film** **The Quiet Girl (Ireland)**: Argentina, 1985 (Argentina); Bardo, False Chronicle of a Handful of Truths (Mexico); Broker (South Korea); One Fine Morning (France)
**Best TV Series** **The Old Man**: Abbott Elementary; Only Murders in the Building; The White Lotus; Yellowstone	**Best TV Movie/Limited Series** **Black Bird**: The Dropout; Inventing Anna; The Staircase; The Watcher
**Best Actor (TV)** **Jeff Bridges – The Old Man**: Steve Carell – The Patient; Bob Odenkirk – Better Call Saul; Gary Oldman – Slow Horses; Wes Studi – Reservation Dogs	**Best Actress (TV)** **Sheryl Lee Ralph – Abbott Elementary**: Christina Applegate – Dead to Me; Toni Collette – The Staircase; Laura Linney – Ozark; Rhea Seehorn – Better Call Saul

=== Career Achievement Award ===
- Jamie Lee Curtis

"Jamie Lee Curtis' long-standing, ever-increasing career shatters Hollywood's outmoded stereotypes about aging, and it exemplifies what AARP's Movies for Grownups program is all about," AARP CEO Jo Ann Jenkins said. "She soars higher than ever this year, with her last Halloween movie and Everything Everywhere All at Once, which may well earn her her first Oscar nomination at 64 — on top of the Movies for Grownups Career Achievement Award, our highest honor."

== Multiple nominations and awards ==
=== Films with multiple nominations ===
Films that received multiple nominations
Nominations	Film
6	The Fabelmans
5	Everything Everywhere All at Once
5	The Woman King
4	She Said
4	Tár
3	Elvis
3	Women Talking
2	Armageddon Time
2	Good Luck to You, Leo Grande
2	Living
2	A Man Called Otto
2	Till
2	Top Gun: Maverick

=== Series with multiple nominations ===
Series that received multiple nominations
Nominations	Series
2	Abbott Elementary
2	Better Call Saul
2	The Old Man
2	The Staircase

=== Films with multiple awards ===
Films that received multiple awards
Awards	Film
2	Elvis

=== Series with multiple awards ===
Series that received multiple awards
Awards	Series
2	The Old Man
