= 24th AARP Movies for Grownups Awards =

Film award ceremony

- Awarded for: Film and television by and about people over 50
- Date: February 8, 2025
- Site: Beverly Wilshire Hotel, Los Angeles
- Hosted by: Alan Cumming

Highlights
- Best Film: A Complete Unknown
- Most awards: A Complete Unknown (2)
- Most nominations: Conclave (6)

Television coverage
- Network: PBS

The 24th AARP Movies for Grownups Awards, presented by AARP: The Magazine, honored films and television series released in 2024. Nominations were announced on November 20, 2024, with the political thriller Conclave and the biographical musical drama A Complete Unknown leading the nominations with six and five, respectively.

Created by and about people over the age of 50, the winners were to be announced on January 11, 2025, at an in-person ceremony at the Beverly Wilshire Hotel in Los Angeles, hosted once again by Scottish actor Alan Cumming. However, the awards ceremony was postponed to February 8, due to the January 2025 Southern California wildfires. The event was broadcast by Great Performances on PBS on February 23, 2025. Additionally, AARP Foundation, a charitable affiliate of AARP, donated proceeds raised from the Movies for Grownups Awards to local organizations to aid with Los Angeles' wildfire recovery efforts for affected families and communities.

Glenn Close received the Career Achievement Award.

== Awards ==
=== Winners and nominees ===
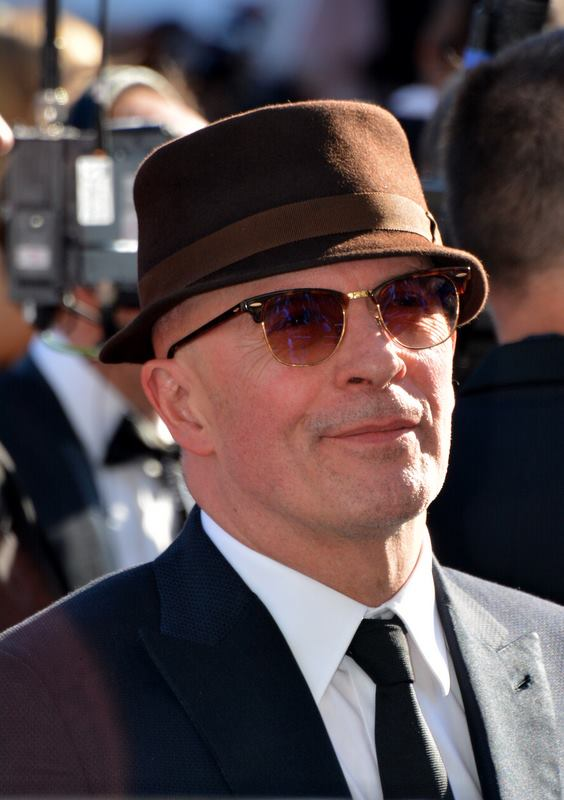
Jacques Audiard, Best Director winner

Adrien Brody, Best Actor winner

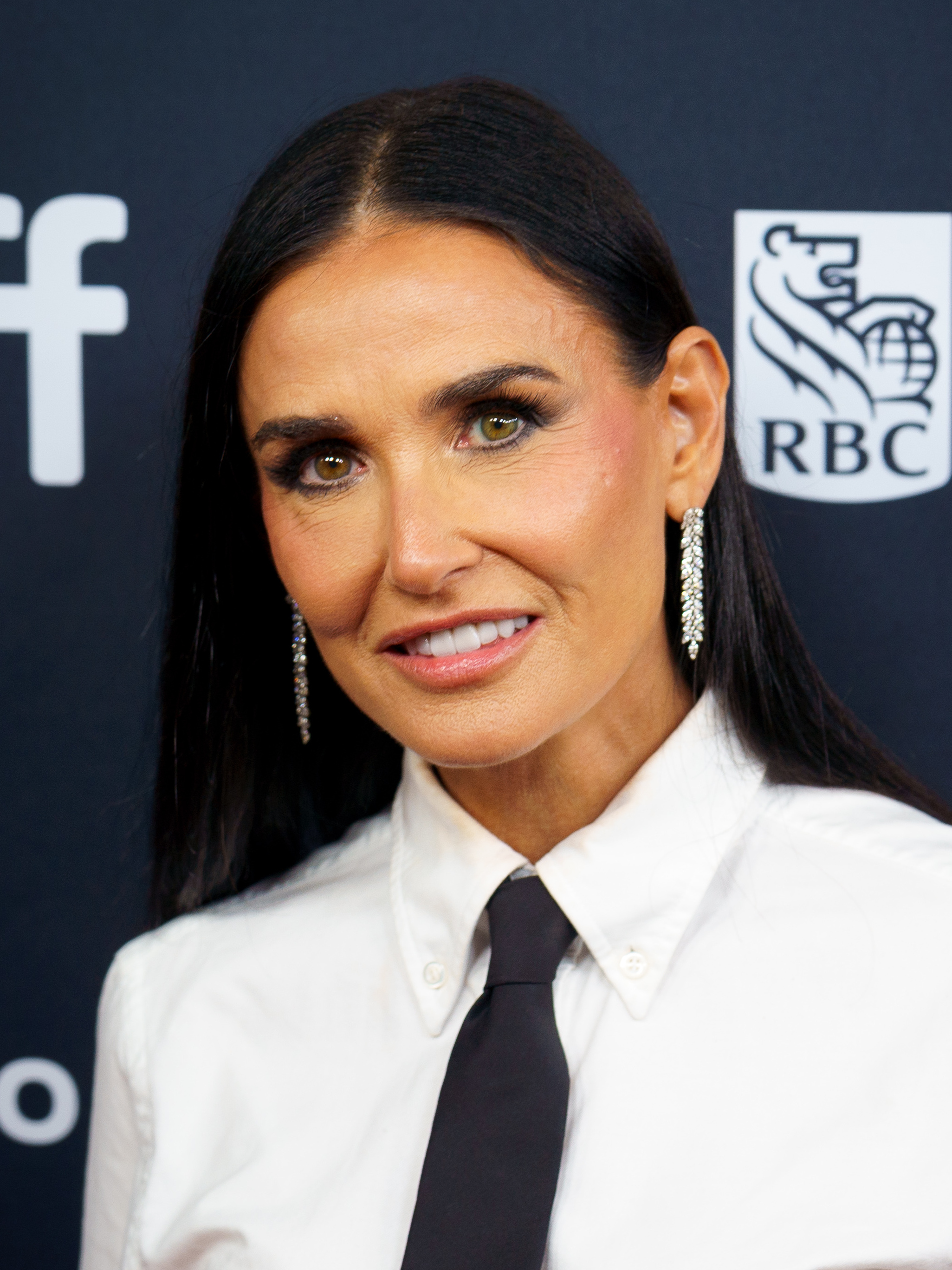
Demi Moore, Best Actress winner

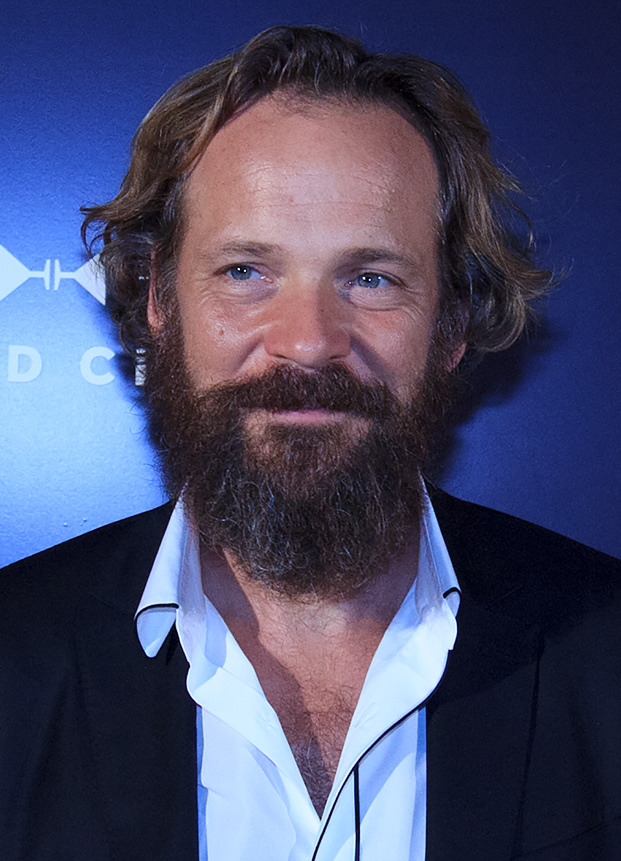
Peter Sarsgaard, Best Supporting Actor winner

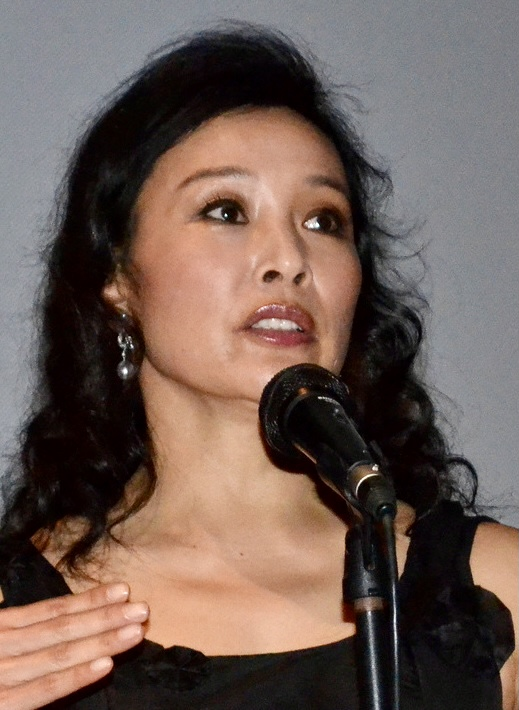
Joan Chen, Best Supporting Actress winner

Winners are listed first and highlighted in boldface.

**Best Picture**: **A Complete Unknown**; Conclave; Emilia Pérez; Gladiator II; September 5	**Best Director**: **Jacques Audiard – Emilia Pérez**; Pedro Almodóvar – The Room Next Door; Edward Berger – Conclave; James Mangold – A Complete Unknown; Ridley Scott – Gladiator II
**Best Actor**: **Adrien Brody – The Brutalist**; Daniel Craig – Queer; Colman Domingo – Sing Sing; Ralph Fiennes – Conclave; Jude Law – The Order	**Best Actress**: **Demi Moore – The Substance**; Pamela Anderson – The Last Showgirl; Marianne Jean-Baptiste – Hard Truths; Nicole Kidman – Babygirl; June Squibb – Thelma
**Best Supporting Actor**: **Peter Sarsgaard – September 5**; Clarence Maclin – Sing Sing; Guy Pearce – The Brutalist; Stanley Tucci – Conclave; Denzel Washington – Gladiator II	**Best Supporting Actress**: **Joan Chen – Dìdi**; Aunjanue Ellis-Taylor – Nickel Boys; Lesley Manville – Queer; Connie Nielsen – Gladiator II; Isabella Rossellini – Conclave
**Best Screenwriter**: **Winnie Holzman and Dana Fox – Wicked**; Jacques Audiard, Thomas Bidegain, and Nicolas Livecchi – Emilia Pérez; Jay Cocks and James Mangold – A Complete Unknown; Peter Straughan – Conclave; Denis Villeneuve and Jon Spaihts – Dune: Part Two	**Best Ensemble**: **Sing Sing**; Beetlejuice Beetlejuice; A Complete Unknown; His Three Daughters; September 5
**Best Intergenerational Movie**: **Thelma**; Dìdi; Here; His Three Daughters; The Piano Lesson	**Best Time Capsule**: **A Complete Unknown**; The Brutalist; Here; Maria; September 5
**Best Documentary**: **Super/Man: The Christopher Reeve Story**; I Am: Celine Dion; Luther: Never Too Much; Piece by Piece; Will & Harper	**Best TV Series or Limited Series**: **Shōgun**; The Crown; Hacks; Palm Royale; Slow Horses
**Best Actor (TV)**: **Jon Hamm – Fargo**; Billy Crudup – The Morning Show; Idris Elba – Hijack; Gary Oldman – Slow Horses; Hiroyuki Sanada – Shōgun	**Best Actress (TV)**: **Jodie Foster – True Detective: Night Country**; Jennifer Aniston – The Morning Show; Jean Smart – Hacks; Meryl Streep – Only Murders in the Building; Sofía Vergara – Griselda
**Career Achievement Award**: **Glenn Close** (Note: "Close proves that a Career Achievement winner need not be one gazing back on past glory (which in her case includes scads of major award nominations and wins). She starred in the 2024 Netflix horror hit The Deliverance, and will be featured in both the upcoming Knives Out mystery Wake Up Dead Man and Ryan Murphy's Hulu legal drama All's Fair.")

== Multiple nominations ==
=== Films with multiple nominations ===
Films that received multiple nominations
Nominations	Film
6	Conclave
5	A Complete Unknown
4	Gladiator II
4	September 5
3	The Brutalist
3	Emilia Pérez
3	Sing Sing
2	Dìdi
2	Here
2	His Three Daughters
2	Queer
2	Thelma

=== Series with multiple nominations ===
Series that received multiple nominations
Nominations	Series
2	Hacks
2	The Morning Show
2	Shōgun
2	Slow Horses
