= AARP Movies for Grownups Award for Best Actor (TV/Streaming) =

Annual US television award

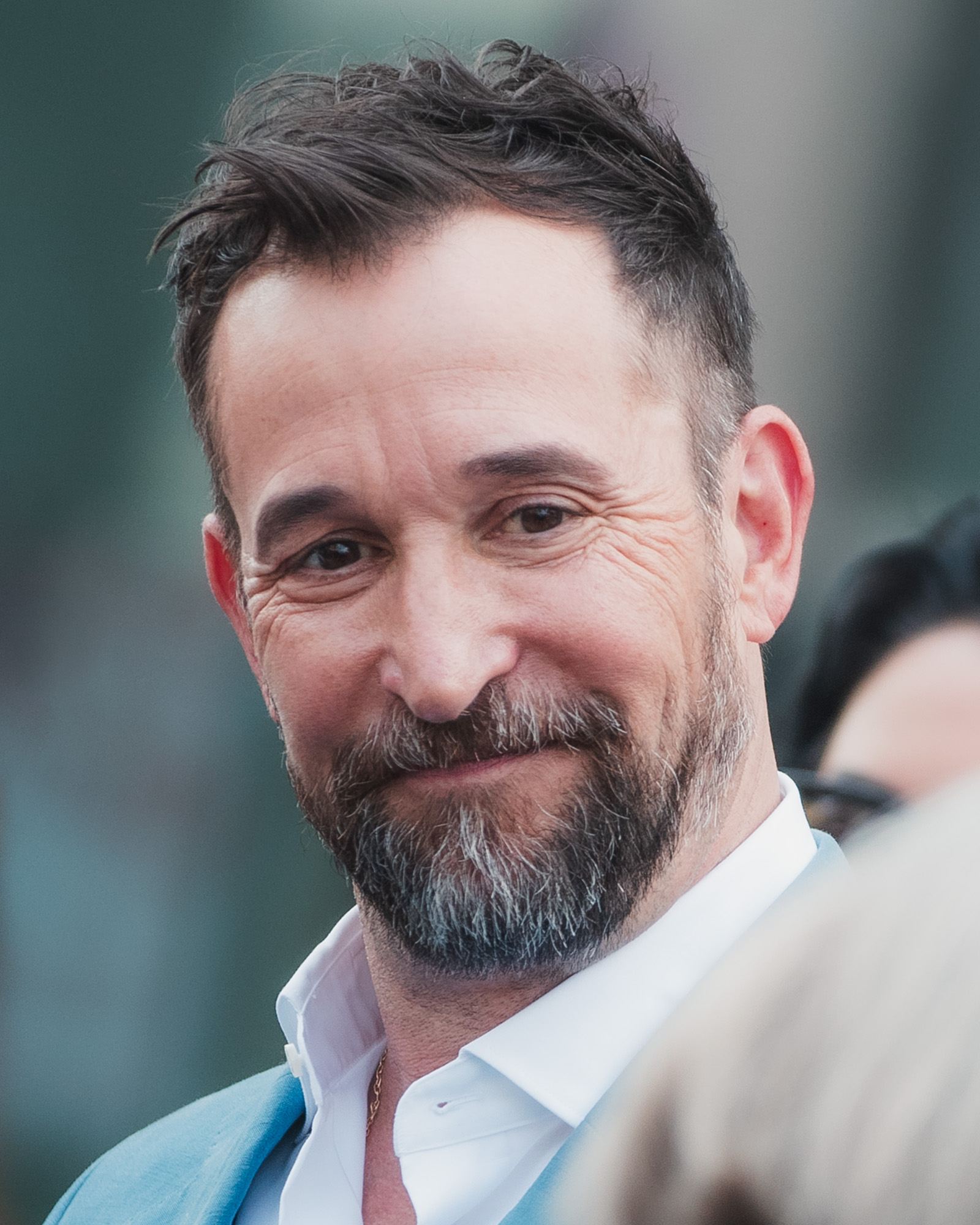
- The 2025 recipient: Noah Wyle
- Awarded for: Best performance by an actor over the age of 50 on a television or streaming program
- Country: United States
- Presented by: AARP
- First award: Mark Ruffalo for I Know This Much is True (2020)
- Most recent winner: Noah Wyle for The Pitt (2025)
- Website: https://www.aarp.org/entertainment/movies-for-grownups/

The AARP Movies for Grownups Award for Best Actor (TV/Streaming) is one of the AARP Movies for Grownups Awards presented annually by the AARP. The award honors the best performance in a television or streaming series by an actor over the age of 50.

The first television award given by AARP was titled Best TV Movie, and was given to Hell on Heels: The Battle of Mary Kay in 2003. That category was discontinued after 2006 before returning in 2021 as Best TV Movie/Limited Series alongside three new awards for Best Series, Best Actress, and Best Actor.

== Winners and Nominees ==
indicates the winners.

=== 2020s ===
Year	Actor	Role	Series	Network
2020–21 (20th)	Mark Ruffalo‡	Dominick and Thomas Birdsey	I Know This Much is True	HBO
2020–21 (20th)	Jason Bateman	Marty Byrde	Ozark	Netflix
2020–21 (20th)	Ted Danson	Michael	The Good Place	NBC
2020–21 (20th)	Hugh Grant	Jonathan Fraser	The Undoing	HBO
2020–21 (20th)	Ethan Hawke	John Brown	The Good Lord Bird	Showtime
2021 (21st)	Michael Keaton	Dr. Samuel Finnix	Dopesick	Hulu
2021 (21st)	Kevin Costner	John Dutton	Yellowstone	Paramount Network
2021 (21st)	Ewan McGregor	Halston	Halston	Netflix
2021 (21st)	Billy Porter	Prayerful "Pray" Tell	Pose	FX
2021 (21st)	Martin Short	Oliver Putnam	Only Murders in the Building	Hulu
2022 (22nd)	Jeff Bridges	Dan Chase / Henry Dixon / Johnny Kohler	The Old Man	FX
2022 (22nd)	Steve Carell	Alan Strauss	The Patient	FX on Hulu
2022 (22nd)	Bob Odenkirk	Jimmy McGill / Saul Goodman / Gene Takavic	Better Call Saul	AMC
2022 (22nd)	Gary Oldman	Jackson Lamb	Slow Horses	Apple TV+
2022 (22nd)	Wes Studi	Bucky	Reservation Dogs	FX on Hulu
2023 (23rd)	Bryan Cranston	Michael Desiato	Your Honor	Showtime
2023 (23rd)	Brian Cox	Logan Roy	Succession	HBO
2023 (23rd)	Oliver Platt	Jimmy "Cicero" Kalinowski	The Bear	FX on Hulu
2023 (23rd)	Rufus Sewell	Hal Wyler	The Diplomat	Netflix
2023 (23rd)	Henry Winkler	Gene Cousineau	Barry	HBO
2024 (24th)	Jon Hamm	Sheriff Roy Tillman	Fargo	Showtime
2024 (24th)	Billy Crudup	Cory Ellison	The Morning Show	Apple TV+
2024 (24th)	Idris Elba	Sam Nelson	Hijack	Apple TV+
2024 (24th)	Gary Oldman	Jackson Lamb	Slow Horses	Apple TV+
2024 (24th)	Hiroyuki Sanada	Lord Yoshii Toranaga	Shōgun	FX on Hulu
2025 (25th)	Noah Wyle	Dr. Michael "Robby" Robinavitch	The Pitt	HBO Max
2025 (25th)	Walton Goggins	Rick Hatchett	The White Lotus	HBO
2025 (25th)	Stephen Graham	Eddie Miller	Adolescence	Netflix
2025 (25th)	Gary Oldman	Jackson Lamb	Slow Horses	Apple TV+
2025 (25th)	Pedro Pascal	Joel Miller	The Last of Us	HBO
