= AARP Movies for Grownups Award for Best TV Movie/Limited Series =

Retired annual US television award

AARP Movies for Grownups Award for TV Movie/Limited Series
- Awarded for: Best TV Movie or Limited Series made by or for people over the age of 50
- Country: United States
- Presented by: AARP
- First award: Hell on Heels: The Battle of Mary Kay (2002)
- Final award: Black Bird (2022)
- Website: https://www.aarp.org/entertainment/movies-for-grownups/

The AARP Movies for Grownups Award for Best TV Movie/Limited Series was one of the AARP Movies for Grownups Awards presented annually by the AARP. The award honored the best television movie or limited series in a given year made by or featuring artists over the age of 50.

The first television award given by AARP was titled Best TV Movie, and was given to Hell on Heels: The Battle of Mary Kay in 2003. The category was discontinued after 2006 before returning with its current name in 2021 as part of a slate of four television awards, alongside Best Series, Best Actress, and Best Actor.

Starting with the 23rd AARP Movies for Grownups Awards, the Best TV Series and Best TV Movie/Limited Series categories were retired and combined into Best TV Series or Limited Series.

== Winners and Nominees ==
indicates the winners.

=== 2000s ===
Year	Film	Director(s)	Network
2002 (2nd)	Hell on Heels: The Battle of Mary Kay	Ed Gernon	CBS
2002 (2nd)	Martin and Lewis	John Gray	CBS
2002 (2nd)	Path to War	John Frankenheimer	HBO
2003 (3rd)	Angels in America	Mike Nichols	HBO
2003 (3rd)	My House in Umbria	Richard Loncraine	HBO
2004 (4th)	The Five People You Meet in Heaven	Lloyd Kramer	ABC
2004 (4th)	The Life and Death of Peter Sellers	Stephen Hopkins	HBO
2005 (5th)	The Girl in the Café	David Yates	BBC One
2005 (5th)	Empire Falls	Fred Schepisi	HBO
2005 (5th)	Lackawanna Blues	George C. Wolfe	HBO
2005 (5th)	Sometimes in April	Raoul Peck	HBO
2005 (5th)	Warm Springs	Joseph Sargent	HBO

=== 2020s ===
Year	Film	Director(s)	Network
2020/21 (20th)	The Queen's Gambit	Scott Frank	Netflix
2020/21 (20th)	Mrs. America	Anna Boden and Ryan Fleck, Amma Asante, Laure de Clermont-Tonnerre, Janicza Bravo	FX on Hulu
2020/21 (20th)	Small Axe	Steve McQueen	BBC One
2020/21 (20th)	Unorthodox	Maria Schrader	Netflix
2020/21 (20th)	Watchmen (Note: Watchmen aired all of its episodes in 2019. AARP did not issue an explanation as to why it was eligible for the awards for 2020/21.)	Nicole Kassell, Stephen Williams, Andrij Parekh, Steph Green, David Semel, Frederick E.O. Toye	HBO
2021 (21st)	Mare of Easttown	Craig Zobel	HBO
2021 (21st)	Halston	Daniel Minahan	Netflix
2021 (21st)	Maid	John Wells, Nzingha Stewart, Lila Neugebauer, Helen Shaver, Quyen Tran	Netflix
2021 (21st)	Nine Perfect Strangers	Jonathan Levine	Hulu
2021 (21st)	The Underground Railroad	Barry Jenkins	Amazon Prime Video
2022 (22nd)	Black Bird	Michaël R. Roskam, Jim McKay, Joe Chappelle	Apple TV+
2022 (22nd)	The Dropout	Michael Showalter, Francesca Gregorini, Erica Watson	Hulu
2022 (22nd)	Inventing Anna	David Frankel, Tom Verica, Daisy von Scherler Mayer, Ellen Kuras, Nzingha Stewart	Netflix
2022 (22nd)	The Staircase	Antonio Campos, Leigh Janiak	HBO
2022 (22nd)	The Watcher	Ryan Murphy, Paris Barclay, Jennifer Lynch, Max Winkler	Netflix
