= 25th AARP Movies for Grownups Awards =

Film award ceremony

- Awarded for: Film and television by and about people over 50
- Presented on: January 10, 2026
- Site: Beverly Wilshire Hotel, Los Angeles
- Hosted by: Alan Cumming

Highlights
- Best Film: Hamnet
- Most awards: Film: One Battle After Another (3); TV: The Pitt (2)
- Most nominations: One Battle After Another (8)

Television coverage
- Network: PBS

The 25th AARP Movies for Grownups Awards, presented by AARP: The Magazine, honored films and television series released in 2025. The nominations were announced on November 19, 2025, with the action thriller One Battle After Another leading the nominations with eight, followed by the historical drama Nuremberg with four.

Created by and about people over the age of 50, the winners were announced on January 10, 2026. The ceremony took place at the Beverly Wilshire Hotel in Los Angeles and was hosted by Alan Cumming. The event was broadcast by Great Performances on PBS on February 22, 2026.

Adam Sandler received the Career Achievement Award.

== Awards ==
=== Winners and nominees ===
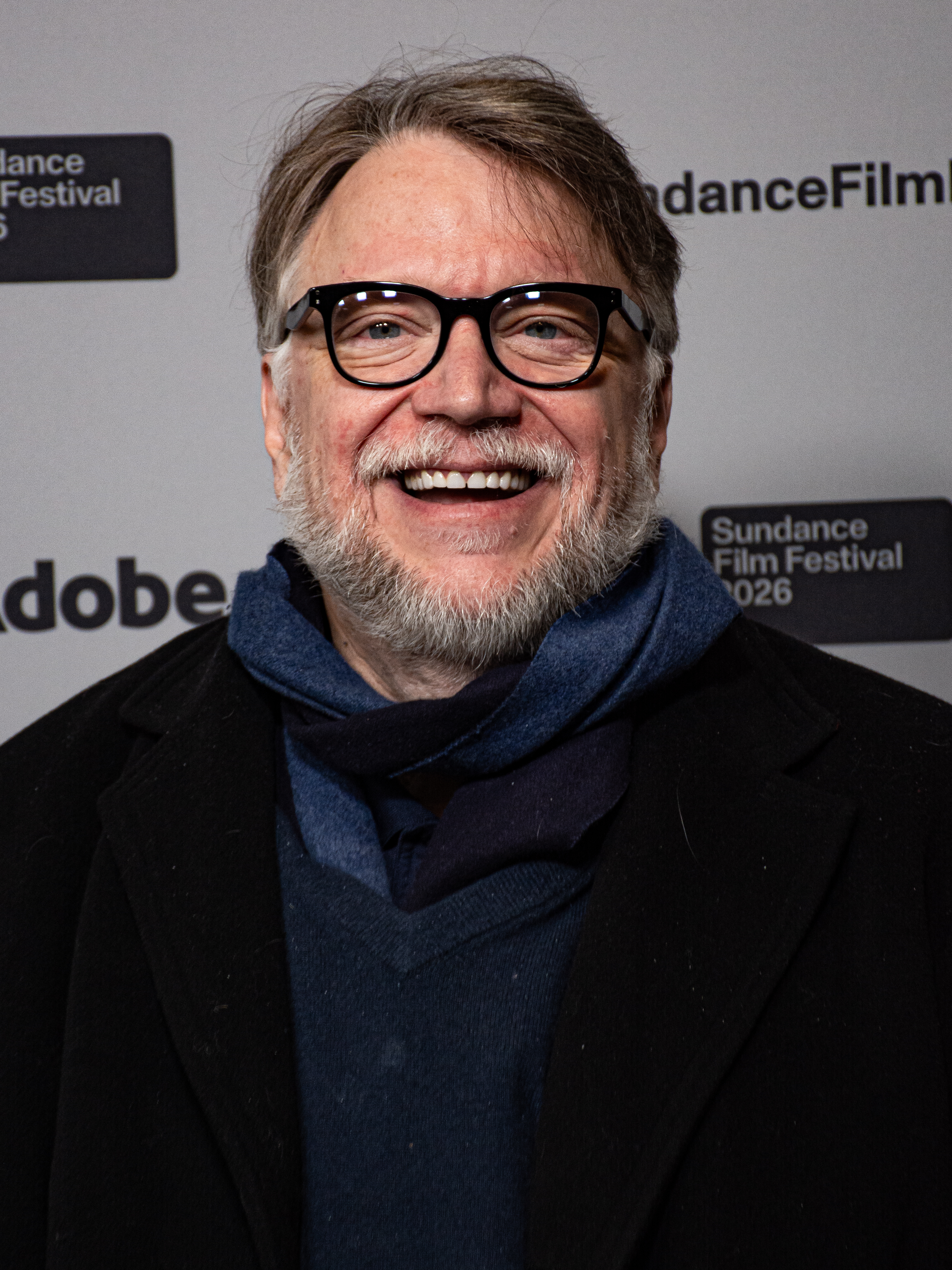
Guillermo del Toro, Best Director winner

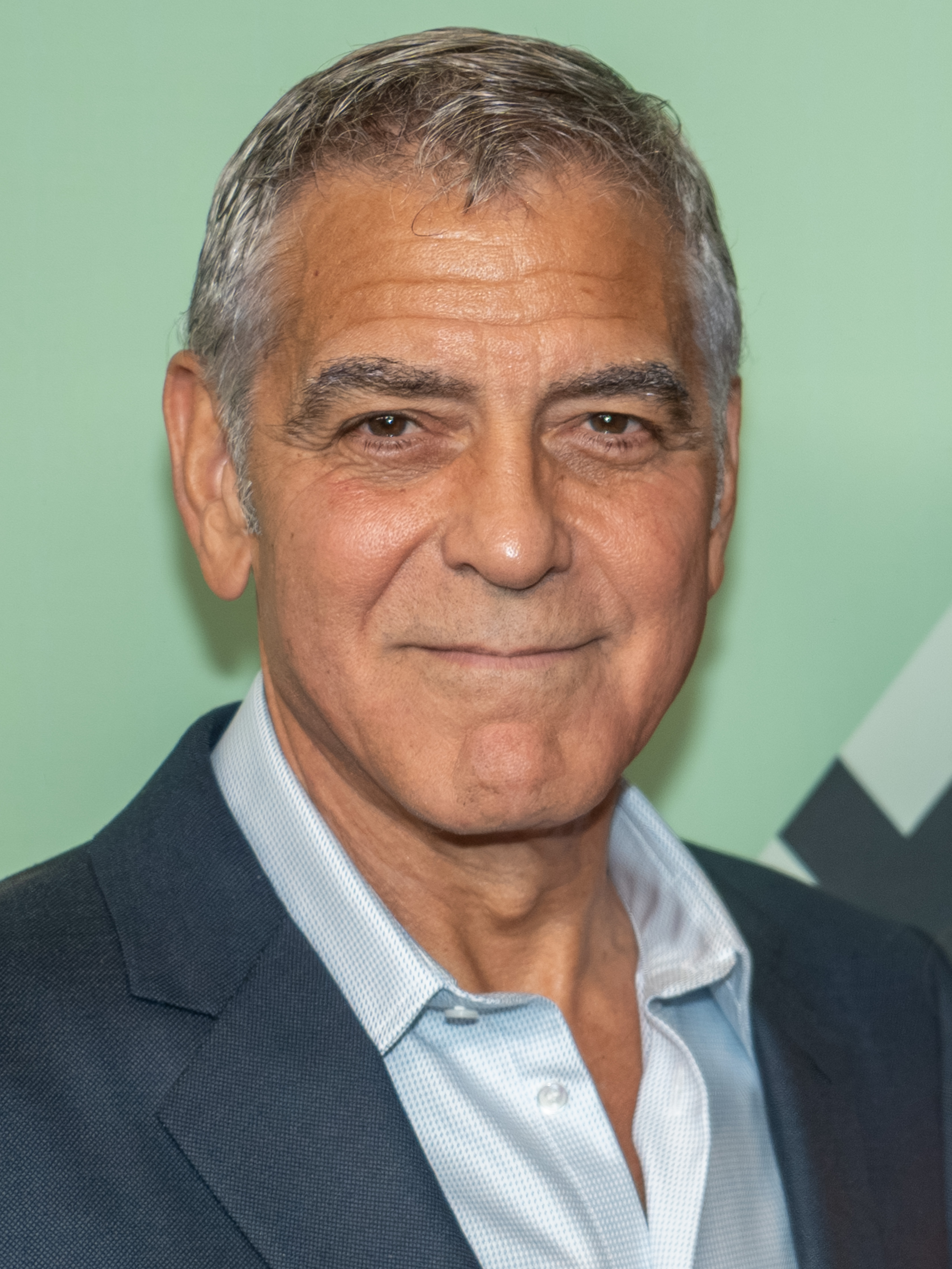
George Clooney, Best Actor winner

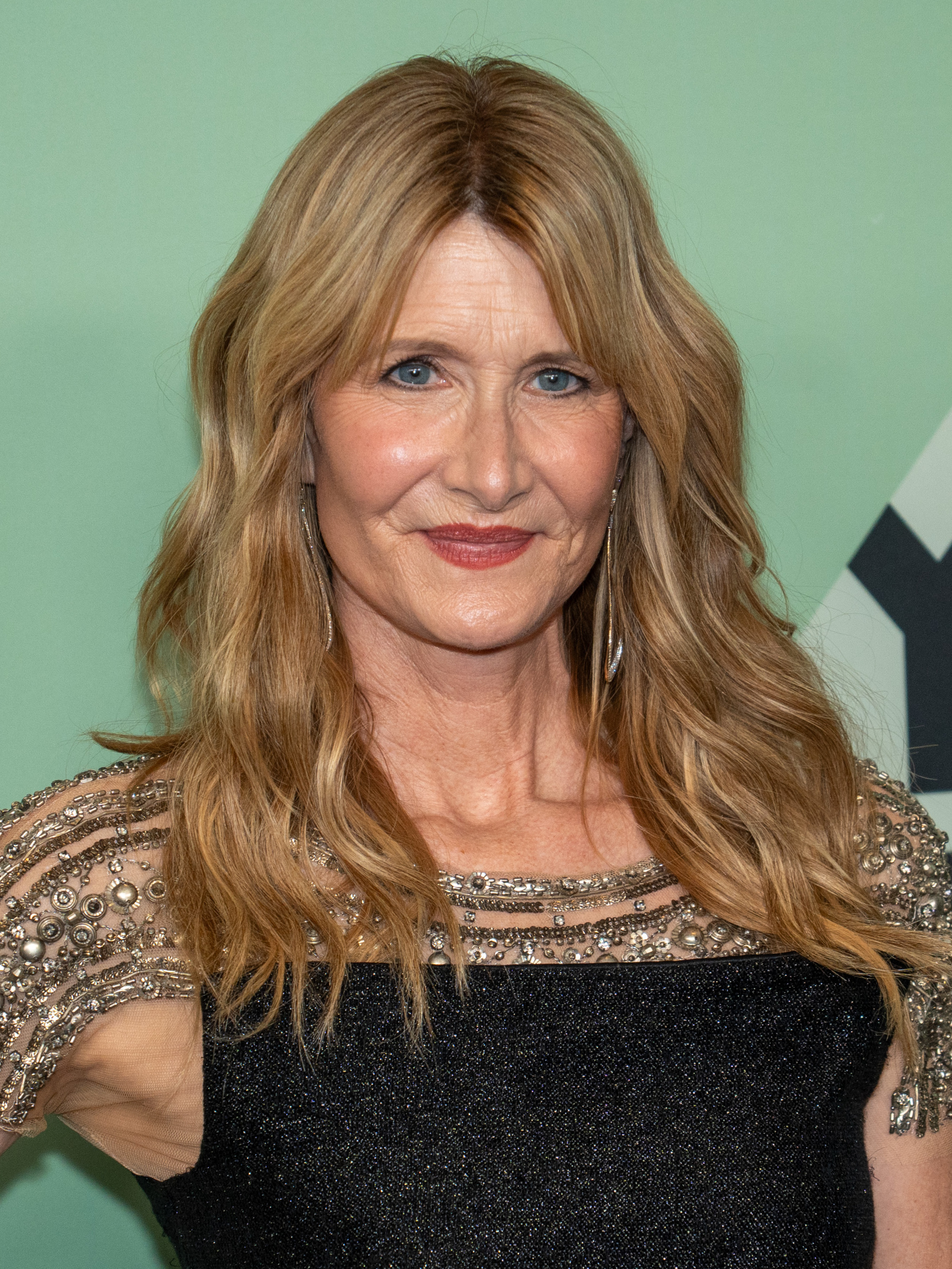
Laura Dern, Best Actress winner

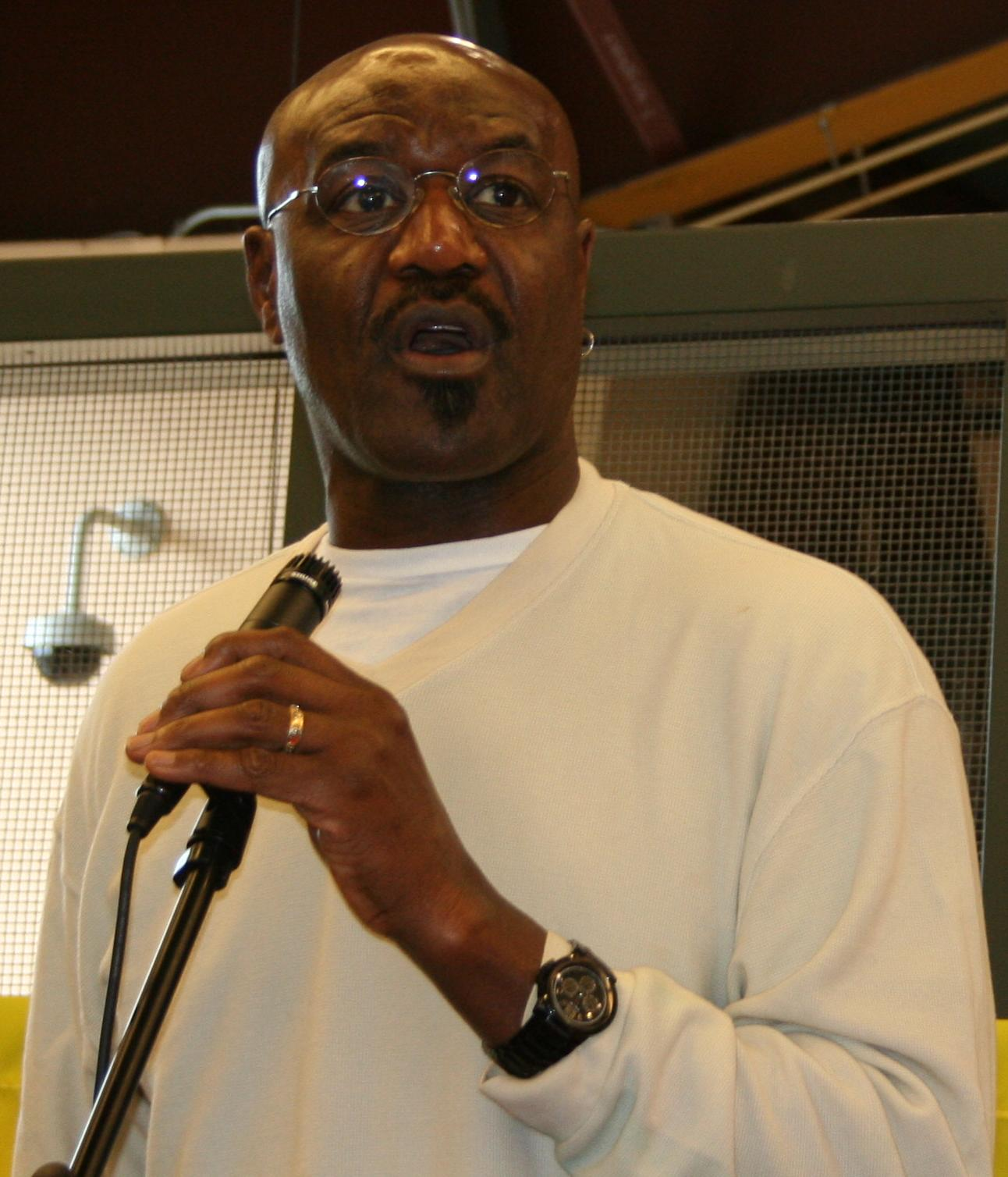
Delroy Lindo, Best Supporting Actor winner

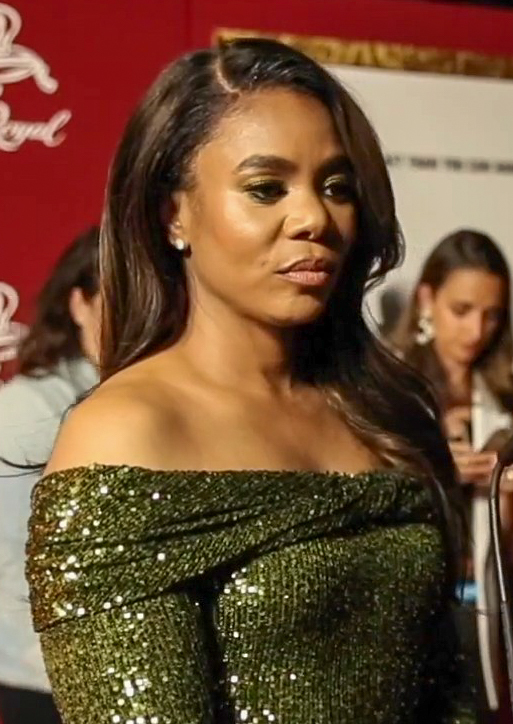
Regina Hall, Best Supporting Actress winner

Winners are listed first and highlighted in boldface.

| **Best Picture**: **Hamnet**; A House of Dynamite; One Battle After Another; Sinners; Train Dreams | **Best Director**: **Guillermo del Toro – Frankenstein**; Paul Thomas Anderson – One Battle After Another; Kathryn Bigelow – A House of Dynamite; Scott Cooper – Springsteen: Deliver Me from Nowhere; Spike Lee – Highest 2 Lowest |
| **Best Actor**: **George Clooney – Jay Kelly**; Leonardo DiCaprio – One Battle After Another; Joel Edgerton – Train Dreams; Ethan Hawke – Blue Moon; Dwayne Johnson – The Smashing Machine | **Best Actress**: **Laura Dern – Is This Thing On?**; Jodie Foster – A Private Life; Lucy Liu – Rosemead; Julia Roberts – After the Hunt; June Squibb – Eleanor the Great |
| **Best Supporting Actor**: **Delroy Lindo – Sinners**; Benicio del Toro – One Battle After Another; Sean Penn – One Battle After Another; Michael Shannon – Nuremberg; Stellan Skarsgård – Sentimental Value | **Best Supporting Actress**: **Regina Hall – One Battle After Another**; Amy Madigan – Weapons; Helen Mirren – Goodbye June; Gwyneth Paltrow – Marty Supreme; Sigourney Weaver – Avatar: Fire and Ash |
| **Best Screenwriter**: **Paul Thomas Anderson – One Battle After Another**; Noah Baumbach and Emily Mortimer – Jay Kelly; Bradley Cooper, Will Arnett, and Mark Chappell – Is This Thing On?; Julian Fellowes – Downton Abbey: The Grand Finale; James Vanderbilt – Nuremberg | **Best Ensemble**: **One Battle After Another**; A House of Dynamite; Jay Kelly; Nuremberg; Wake Up Dead Man: A Knives Out Mystery |
| **Best Documentary**: **My Mom Jayne**; Becoming Led Zeppelin; Cover-Up; Riefenstahl; Stiller & Meara: Nothing Is Lost | **Best Foreign-Language Film**: **Sentimental Value**; It Was Just an Accident; No Other Choice; Nouvelle Vague; The Secret Agent |
| **Best Intergenerational Film**: **Sentimental Value**; Eleanor the Great; The Lost Bus; Rental Family; Rosemead | **Best Period Film**: **Springsteen: Deliver Me from Nowhere**; Dead Man's Wire; Marty Supreme; Nuremberg; Sinners |
**Best TV Series or Limited Series**: **The Pitt**; Adolescence; Hacks; The Studio; The White Lotus
| **Best Actor (TV)**: **Noah Wyle – The Pitt**; Walton Goggins – The White Lotus; Stephen Graham – Adolescence; Gary Oldman – Slow Horses; Pedro Pascal – The Last of Us | **Best Actress (TV)**: **Kathy Bates – Matlock**; Kathryn Hahn – The Studio; Catherine O'Hara – The Studio; Parker Posey – The White Lotus; Jean Smart – Hacks |

== Multiple nominations ==
=== Films with multiple nominations ===
Films that received multiple nominations
| Nominations | Film |
|---|---|
| 8 | One Battle After Another |
| 4 | Nuremberg |
| 3 | A House of Dynamite |
| 3 | Jay Kelly |
| 3 | Sentimental Value |
| 3 | Sinners |
| 2 | Eleanor the Great |
| 2 | Is This Thing On? |
| 2 | Marty Supreme |
| 2 | Rosemead |
| 2 | Springsteen |
| 2 | Train Dreams |

=== Series with multiple nominations ===
Series that received multiple nominations
| Nominations | Series |
|---|---|
| 3 | The Studio |
| 3 | The White Lotus |
| 2 | Adolescence |
| 2 | Hacks |
| 2 | The Pitt |

== Multiple wins ==
=== Films with multiple wins ===
Films that received multiple awards
| Wins | Film |
|---|---|
| 3 | One Battle After Another |
| 2 | Sentimental Value |

=== Series with multiple wins ===
Series that received multiple awards
| Wins | Series |
|---|---|
| 2 | The Pitt |
