= AARP Movies for Grownups Award for Best Actress (TV/Streaming) =

Annual US television award

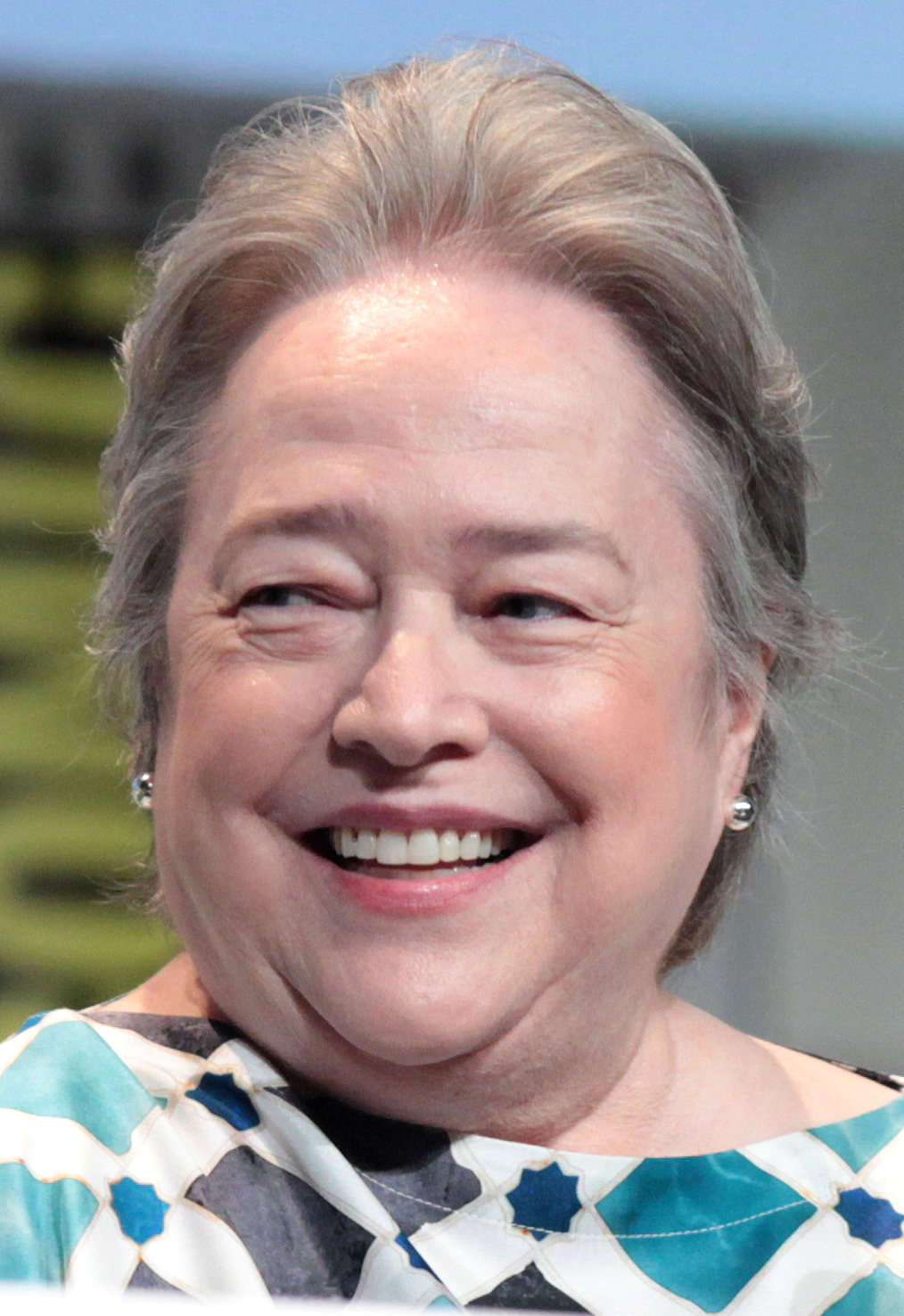
- The 2025 recipient: Kathy Bates
- Awarded for: Best performance by an actress over the age of 50 on a television or streaming program
- Country: United States
- Presented by: AARP
- First award: Catherine O'Hara for Schitt's Creek (2020)
- Most recent winner: Kathy Bates for Matlock (2025)
- Website: https://www.aarp.org/entertainment/movies-for-grownups/

The AARP Movies for Grownups Award for Best Actress (TV/Streaming) is one of the AARP Movies for Grownups Awards presented annually by the AARP. The award honors the best performance in a television or streaming series by an actress over the age of 50.

The first television award given by AARP was titled Best TV Movie, and was given to Hell on Heels: The Battle of Mary Kay in 2003. The category was discontinued after 2006 before returning in 2021 as Best TV Movie/Limited Series alongside three new awards for Best Series, Best Actress, and Best Actor.

== Winners and Nominees ==
indicates the winners.

=== 2020s ===
Year	Actress	Role	Series	Network
2020–21 (20th)	Catherine O'Hara	Moira Rose	Schitt's Creek	CBC Television
2020–21 (20th)	Jennifer Aniston	Alexandra "Alex" Levy	The Morning Show	Apple TV+
2020–21 (20th)	Cate Blanchett	Phyllis Schlafly	Mrs. America	FX on Hulu
2020–21 (20th)	Regina King	Angela Abar / Sister Night	Watchmen	HBO
2020–21 (20th)	Laura Linney	Wendy Byrde	Ozark	Netflix
2021 (21st)	Jean Smart	Deborah Vance	Hacks	HBO Max
2021 (21st)	Gillian Anderson	Margaret Thatcher	The Crown	Netflix
2021 (21st)	Andie MacDowell	Paula	Maid	Netflix
2021 (21st)	Sandra Oh	Ji-Yoon Kim	The Chair	Netflix
2021 (21st)	Lily Tomlin	Frances "Frankie" Bergstein	Grace and Frankie	Netflix
2022 (22nd)	Sheryl Lee Ralph	Barbara Howard	Abbott Elementary	ABC
2022 (22nd)	Christina Applegate	Jen Harding	Dead to Me	Netflix
2022 (22nd)	Toni Collette	Kathleen Peterson	The Staircase	HBO Max
2022 (22nd)	Laura Linney	Wendy Byrde	Ozark	Netflix
2022 (22nd)	Rhea Seehorn	Kim Wexler	Better Call Saul	AMC
2023 (23rd)	Jennifer Coolidge	Tanya McQuoid	The White Lotus	HBO
2023 (23rd)	Jennifer Aniston	Alexandra "Alex" Levy	The Morning Show	Apple TV+
2023 (23rd)	Jennifer Garner	Hannah Hall	The Last Thing He Told Me	Apple TV+
2023 (23rd)	Imelda Staunton	Queen Elizabeth II	The Crown	Netflix
2023 (23rd)	Meryl Streep	Loretta Durkin	Only Murders in the Building	Hulu
2024 (24th)	Jodie Foster	Chief Liz Danvers	True Detective: Night Country	HBO
2024 (24th)	Jennifer Aniston	Alexandra "Alex" Levy	The Morning Show	Apple TV+
2024 (24th)	Jean Smart	Deborah Vance	Hacks	HBO Max
2024 (24th)	Meryl Streep	Loretta Durkin	Only Murders in the Building	Hulu
2024 (24th)	Sofía Vergara	Griselda Blanco	Griselda	Netflix
2025 (25th)	Kathy Bates	Madeline "Matty" Matlock	Matlock	CBS
2025 (25th)	Kathryn Hahn	Maya Mason	The Studio	Apple TV+
2025 (25th)	Catherine O'Hara	Patty Leigh	The Studio	Apple TV+
2025 (25th)	Parker Posey	Victoria Ratliff	The White Lotus	HBO
2025 (25th)	Jean Smart	Deborah Vance	Hacks	HBO Max
