= AARP Movies for Grownups Award for Best Intergenerational Film =

Annual US film award

- Awarded for: Best film highlighting positive intergenerational relationships
- Country: United States
- Presented by: AARP
- First award: Road to Perdition (2002)
- Most recent winner: Sentimental Value (2025)
- Website: https://www.aarp.org/entertainment/movies-for-grownups/

The AARP Movies for Grownups Award for Best Intergenerational Film is one of the AARP Movies for Grownups Awards presented annually by AARP the Magazine.

== History ==
The award honors the film with the best portrayal of relationships between people of different ages. The award for Best Intergenerational Film was first given in 2003, when the awards expanded beyond their initial four categories of Best Movie for Grownups, Best Director, Best Actor, and Best Actress.

== Winners and Nominees ==
indicates the winners.

=== 2000s ===
Year	Film	Director	Ref.
2002 (2nd)	Road to Perdition‡	Sam Mendes ‡	
2002 (2nd)	Antwone Fisher	Denzel Washington	
2002 (2nd)	The Hours	Stephen Daldry	
2002 (2nd)	My Big Fat Greek Wedding	Joel Zwick	
2003 (3rd)	Secondhand Lions‡	Tim McCanlies ‡	
2003 (3rd)	Bend It Like Beckham	Gurinder Chadha	
2003 (3rd)	In America	Jim Sheridan	
2003 (3rd)	Whale Rider	Niki Caro	
2004 (4th)	Miracle‡	Gavin O'Connor ‡	
2004 (4th)	Baadasssss!	Mario Van Peebles	
2004 (4th)	Monsieur Ibrahim	François Dupeyron	
2004 (4th)	The Five Obstructions	Lars von Trier	
2004 (4th)	Spanglish	James L. Brooks	
2005 (5th)	Dreamer: Inspired by a True Story‡	John Gatins ‡	
2005 (5th)	Because of Winn-Dixie	Wayne Wang	
2005 (5th)	In Her Shoes	Curtis Hanson	
2005 (5th)	Mrs. Palfrey at the Claremont	Dan Ireland	
2005 (5th)	The Squid and the Whale	Noah Baumbach	
2006 (6th)	Akeelah and the Bee‡	Doug Atchison ‡	
2006 (6th)	Aurora Borealis	James C.E. Burke	
2006 (6th)	Brooklyn Lobster	Kevin Jordan	
2006 (6th)	Little Miss Sunshine	Jonathan Dayton and Valerie Faris	
2006 (6th)	Quinceañera	Richard Glatzer and Wash Westmoreland	
2007 (7th)	The Namesake‡	Mira Nair ‡	
2007 (7th)	The Great Debaters	Denzel Washington	
2007 (7th)	3:10 to Yuma	James Mangold	
2007 (7th)	The Savages	Tamara Jenkins	
2007 (7th)	Juno	Jason Reitman	
2008 (8th)	The Visitor‡	Tom McCarthy‡	
2008 (8th)	Rachel Getting Married	Jonathan Demme	
2008 (8th)	Gran Torino	Clint Eastwood	
2008 (8th)	The Curious Case of Benjamin Button	David Fincher	
2008 (8th)	Smart People	Noam Murro	
2009 (9th)	Everybody's Fine‡	Kirk Jones ‡	
2009 (9th)	The Blind Side	John Lee Hancock	
2009 (9th)	Taking Woodstock	Ang Lee	
2009 (9th)	Whip It	Drew Barrymore	

=== 2010s ===
Year	Film	Director	Ref.
2010 (10th)	Flipped‡	Rob Reiner ‡	
2010 (10th)	The Karate Kid	Harald Zwart	
2010 (10th)	The Kids Are All Right	Lisa Cholodenko	
2010 (10th)	That Evening Sun	Scott Teems	
2010 (10th)	Touching Home	Logan and Noah Miller	
2011 (11th)	Win Win‡	Tom McCarthy ‡	
2011 (11th)	The First Grader	Justin Chadwick	
2011 (11th)	Hugo	Martin Scorsese	
2011 (11th)	The Music Never Stopped	Jim Kohlberg	
2012 (12th)	Silver Linings Playbook‡	David O. Russell ‡	
2012 (12th)	Moonrise Kingdom	Wes Anderson	
2012 (12th)	Parental Guidance	Andy Fickman	
2012 (12th)	Starlet	Sean Baker	
2012 (12th)	Trouble with the Curve	Robert Lorenz	
2013 (13th)	Nebraska‡	Alexander Payne ‡	
2013 (13th)	Bless Me, Ultima	Carl Franklin	
2013 (13th)	The Book Thief	Brian Percival	
2013 (13th)	Philomena	Stephen Frears	
2013 (13th)	The Way, Way Back	Nat Faxon and Jim Rash	
2014 (14th)	St. Vincent‡	Theodore Melfi ‡	
2014 (14th)	Chef	Jon Favreau	
2014 (14th)	The Judge	David Dobkin	
2014 (14th)	This Is Where I Leave You	Shawn Levy	
2015 (15th)	Creed‡	Ryan Coogler ‡	
2015 (15th)	Grandma	Paul Weitz	
2015 (15th)	The Intern	Nancy Meyers	
2015 (15th)	Straight Outta Compton	F. Gary Gray	
2015 (15th)	Woman in Gold	Simon Curtis	
2016 (16th)	20th Century Women‡	Mike Mills ‡	
2016 (16th)	A Monster Calls	J.A. Bayona	
2016 (16th)	Fences	Denzel Washington	
2016 (16th)	Lion	Garth Davis	
2016 (16th)	The Hollars	John Krasinski	
2017 (17th)	The Florida Project‡	Sean Baker ‡	
2017 (17th)	The Big Sick	Michael Showalter	
2017 (17th)	Lady Bird	Greta Gerwig	
2017 (17th)	Marjorie Prime	Michael Almereyda	
2017 (17th)	Wonder	Stephen Chbosky	
2018 (18th)	Mary Poppins Returns‡	Rob Marshall‡	
2018 (18th)	A Quiet Place	John Krasinski	
2018 (18th)	Beautiful Boy	Felix van Groeningen	
2018 (18th)	Ben Is Back	Peter Hedges	
2018 (18th)	Crazy Rich Asians	John M. Chu	
2019 (19th)	The Farewell‡	Lulu Wang	
2019 (19th)	A Beautiful Day in the Neighborhood	Marielle Heller	
2019 (19th)	Little Women	Greta Gerwig	
2019 (19th)	Parasite	Bong Joon-ho	
2019 (19th)	The Etruscan Smile	Oded Binnun and Mihal Brezis	

=== 2020s ===
Year	Film	Director	Ref.
2020/21 (20th)	Minari‡	Lee Isaac Chung ‡	
2020/21 (20th)	The Father	Florian Zeller	
2020/21 (20th)	Hillbilly Elegy	Ron Howard	
2020/21 (20th)	The Life Ahead	Edoardo Ponti	
2020/21 (20th)	On the Rocks	Sofia Coppola	
2021 (21st)	CODA‡	Sian Heder	
2021 (21st)	Belfast	Kenneth Branagh	
2021 (21st)	C'Mon C'Mon	Mike Mills	
2021 (21st)	King Richard	Reinaldo Marcus Green	
2021 (21st)	The Tender Bar	George Clooney	
2022 (22nd)	Till‡	Chinonye Chukwu	
2022 (22nd)	Armageddon Time	James Gray	
2022 (22nd)	Everything Everywhere All at Once	Daniel Kwan & Daniel Schienart	
2022 (22nd)	The Fabelmans	Steven Spielberg	
2022 (22nd)	A Man Called Otto	Marc Forster	
2023 (23rd)	The Holdovers‡	Alexander Payne	
2023 (23rd)	American Fiction	Cord Jefferson	
2023 (23rd)	Indiana Jones and the Dial of Destiny	James Mangold	
2023 (23rd)	Leave the World Behind	Sam Esmail	
2023 (23rd)	Poor Things	Yorgos Lanthimos	
2024 (24th)	Thelma‡	Josh Margolin	
2024 (24th)	Dìdi	Sean Wang	
2024 (24th)	Here	Robert Zemeckis	
2024 (24th)	His Three Daughters	Azazel Jacobs	
2024 (24th)	The Piano Lesson	Malcolm Washington	
2025 (25th)	Sentimental Value‡	Joachim Trier	
2025 (25th)	Eleanor the Great	Scarlett Johansson	
2025 (25th)	The Lost Bus	Paul Greengrass	
2025 (25th)	Rental Family	Hikari	
2025 (25th)	Rosemead	Eric Lin	
