= AARP Movies for Grownups Award for Best Time Capsule =

Annual award

- Awarded for: Best encapsulation of a specific historical period
- Country: United States
- Presented by: AARP
- First award: Catch Me If You Can (2002)
- Currently held by: Springsteen: Deliver Me from Nowhere (2025)
- Website: https://www.aarp.org/entertainment/movies-for-grownups/

The AARP Movies for Grownups Award for Best Time Capsule is one of the AARP Movies for Grownups Awards presented annually by the AARP. The award honors the film that best encapsulates a specific period in history, usually from the twentieth century.

== History ==
The award for Best Time Capsule was first given in 2003, when the awards expanded beyond their initial categories of Best Movie for Grownups, Best Director, Best Actor, Best Actress, Best Documentary, Best Foreign Film, and Best Movie for Grownups Who Refuse to Grow Up.

No films were nominated for or awarded Best Time Capsule between 2006 and 2011. No explanation was given for the award's disappearance, or for its return with the 2011 awards.

== Winners and Nominees ==
indicates the winners.

=== 2000s ===
Year	Film	Director
2002 (2nd)	Catch Me If You Can‡	Steven Spielberg
2002 (2nd)	Confessions of a Dangerous Mind	George Clooney
2002 (2nd)	Far from Heaven	Todd Haynes
2002 (2nd)	Road to Perdition	Sam Mendes
2003 (3rd)	Down with Love‡	Peyton Reed
2003 (3rd)	A Mighty Wind	Christopher Guest
2003 (3rd)	Seabiscuit	Gary Ross
2004 (4th)	De-Lovely‡	Irwin Winkler
2004 (4th)	The Aviator	Martin Scorsese
2004 (4th)	Beyond the Sea	Kevin Spacey
2004 (4th)	The Notebook	Nick Cassavetes
2004 (4th)	Vera Drake	Mike Leigh
2005 (5th)	Cinderella Man‡	Ron Howard
2005 (5th)	Good Night, and Good Luck.	George Clooney
2005 (5th)	North Country	Niki Caro
2005 (5th)	Capote	Bennett Miller
2005 (5th)	Munich	Steven Spielberg
2006 (6th)	Hollywoodland‡	Allen Coulter
2006 (6th)	Bobby	Emilio Estevez
2006 (6th)	Flags of Our Fathers	Clint Eastwood
2006 (6th)	Glory Road	James Gartner
2006 (6th)	The Queen	Stephen Frears
2007 (7th)	The award for Best Time Capsule was not given in 2008.	N/A
2008 (8th)	N/A	N/A
2009 (9th)	N/A	N/A

=== 2010s ===
Year	Film	Director
2010 (10th)	N/A	N/A
2011 (11th)	J. Edgar‡	Clint Eastwood
2011 (11th)	The Help	Tate Taylor
2011 (11th)	The Iron Lady	Phyllida Lloyd
2011 (11th)	Midnight in Paris	Woody Allen
2012 (12th)	Argo‡	Ben Affleck
2012 (12th)	Hitchcock	Sacha Gervasi
2012 (12th)	Hyde Park on Hudson	Roger Michell
2013 (13th)	American Hustle‡	David O. Russell
2013 (13th)	Lee Daniels' The Butler	Lee Daniels
2013 (13th)	Dallas Buyers Club	Jean-Marc Vallée
2013 (13th)	Inside Llewyn Davis	Joel and Ethan Coen
2013 (13th)	The Wolf of Wall Street	Martin Scorsese
2014 (14th)	Big Eyes‡	Tim Burton
2014 (14th)	Get on Up	Tate Taylor
2014 (14th)	Jersey Boys	Clint Eastwood
2014 (14th)	Selma	Ava DuVernay
2015 (15th)	Love & Mercy‡	Bill Pohlad
2015 (15th)	Carol	Phyllis Nagy
2015 (15th)	Joy	David O. Russell
2015 (15th)	The Man from U.N.C.L.E.	Guy Ritchie
2015 (15th)	Straight Outta Compton	F. Gary Gray
2016 (16th)	Jackie‡	Pablo Larraín
2016 (16th)	Hidden Figures	Theodore Melfi
2016 (16th)	Loving	Jeff Nichols
2016 (16th)	Rules Don't Apply	Warren Beatty
2016 (16th)	The Founder	John Lee Hancock
2017 (17th)	Dunkirk‡	Christopher Nolan
2017 (17th)	Battle of the Sexes	Valerie Faris and Jonathan Dayton
2017 (17th)	Darkest Hour	Joe Wright
2017 (17th)	I, Tonya	Craig Gillespie
2017 (17th)	The Post	Steven Spielberg
2018 (18th)	If Beale Street Could Talk‡	Barry Jenkins
2018 (18th)	BlacKkKlansman	Spike Lee
2018 (18th)	Bohemian Rhapsody	Bryan Singer
2018 (18th)	First Man	Damien Chazelle
2018 (18th)	Roma	Alfonso Cuarón
2019 (19th)	Harriet‡	Kasi Lemmons
2019 (19th)	Judy	Rupert Goold
2019 (19th)	Little Women	Greta Gerwig
2019 (19th)	Motherless Brooklyn	Edward Norton
2019 (19th)	Once Upon a Time...in Hollywood	Quentin Tarantino

=== 2020s ===
Year	Film	Director
2020/21 (20th)	Mank‡	David Fincher
2020/21 (20th)	Ma Rainey's Black Bottom	Ruben Santiago Hudson
2020/21 (20th)	One Night in Miami...	Kemp Powers
2020/21 (20th)	The Trial of the Chicago 7	Aaron Sorkin
2020/21 (20th)	The United States vs. Billie Holiday	Lee Daniels
2021 (21st)	Spencer‡	Pablo Larraín
2021 (21st)	Being the Ricardos	Aaron Sorkin
2021 (21st)	Belfast	Kenneth Branagh
2021 (21st)	Licorice Pizza	Paul Thomas Anderson
2021 (21st)	West Side Story	Steven Spielberg
2022 (22nd)	Elvis‡	Baz Luhrmann
2022 (22nd)	Armageddon Time	James Gray
2022 (22nd)	Babylon	Damien Chazelle
2022 (22nd)	The Fabelmans	Steven Spielberg
2022 (22nd)	Till	Chinonye Chukwu
2023 (23rd)	Maestro‡	Bradley Cooper
2023 (23rd)	Ferrari	Michael Mann
2023 (23rd)	Oppenheimer	Christopher Nolan
2023 (23rd)	Priscilla	Sofia Coppola
2023 (23rd)	Rustin	George C. Wolfe
2024 (24th)	A Complete Unknown‡	James Mangold
2024 (24th)	The Brutalist	Brady Corbet
2024 (24th)	Here	Robert Zemeckis
2024 (24th)	Maria	Pablo Larraín
2024 (24th)	September 5	Tim Fehlbaum
2025 (25th)	Springsteen: Deliver Me from Nowhere‡	Scott Cooper
2025 (25th)	Dead Man's Wire	Gus Van Sant
2025 (25th)	Marty Supreme	Josh Safdie
2025 (25th)	Nuremberg	James Vanderbilt
2025 (25th)	Sinners	Ryan Coogler
