= AARP Movies for Grownups Award for Best Documentary =

Annual US film award

- Awarded for: Best documentary film by or about people over 50
- Country: United States
- Presented by: AARP
- First award: Fighter (2001)
- Currently held by: My Mom Jayne (2025)
- Website: https://www.aarp.org/entertainment/movies-for-grownups/

The AARP Movies for Grownups Award for Best Documentary is one of the AARP Movies for Grownups Awards presented annually by the AARP. The award honors the best documentary film from a given year that is made by or focuses on people over the age of 50. The Best Documentary Award is one of the seven original trophies issued by AARP the Magazine, along with awards for Best Movie for Grownups, Best Director, Best Actor, Best Actress, Best Foreign Language Film, and Best Movie for Grownups Who Refuse to Grow Up.

== Winners and Nominees ==
indicates the winners.

=== 2000s ===
Year	Film	Director(s)	Ref.
2001 (1st)	Fighter	Amir Bar-Lev	
2002 (2nd)	Standing in the Shadows of Motown	Paul Justman	
2002 (2nd)	Bowling for Columbine	Michael Moore	
2002 (2nd)	Carnauba: A Son's Memoir	Samuel Curtis Johnson Jr.	
2002 (2nd)	Rivers and Tides	Thomas Riedelsheimer	
2003 (3rd)	Concert for George	David Leland	
2003 (3rd)	Blind Spot: Hitler's Secretary	André Heller; Othmar Schmiderer	
2003 (3rd)	The Fog of War	Errol Morris	
2004 (4th)	Festival Express	Bob Smeaton	
2004 (4th)	Control Room	Jehane Noujaim	
2004 (4th)	Metallica: Some Kind of Monster	Joe Berlinger; Bruce Sinofsky	
2004 (4th)	Riding Giants	Stacy Peralta	
2004 (4th)	The Story of the Weeping Camel	Byambasuren Davaa; Luigi Falnori	
2005 (5th)	Enron: The Smartest Guys in the Room	Alex Gibney	
2005 (5th)	Grizzly Man	Werner Herzog	
2005 (5th)	March of the Penguins	Luc Jacquet	
2005 (5th)	No Direction Home: Bob Dylan	Martin Scorsese	
2005 (5th)	Tell Them Who You Are	Mark Wexler	
2006 (6th)	51 Birch Street	Doug Block	
2006 (6th)	49 Up	Michael Apted	
2006 (6th)	An Inconvenient Truth	Davis Guggenheim	
2006 (6th)	Mr. Conservative: Goldwater on Goldwater	Julie Anderson	
2006 (6th)	Wordplay	Patrick Creadon	
2007 (7th)	In the Shadow of the Moon (tie)	David Sington; Christopher Riley	
2007 (7th)	Sicko (tie)	Michael Moore	
2007 (7th)	For the Bible Tells Me So	Daniel G. Karslake	
2007 (7th)	Hear and Now	Irene Taylor Brodsky	
2007 (7th)	Run Granny, Run	Marlo Poras	
2008 (8th)	Man on Wire	James Marsh	
2008 (8th)	Young@Heart	Stephen Walker	
2008 (8th)	Chris & Don: A Love Story	Guido Santi; Tina Mascara	
2008 (8th)	I.O.U.S.A.	Patrick Creadon	
2008 (8th)	FLOW: For Love of Water	Irena Salina	
2009 (9th)	The Way We Get By	Aron Gaudet	
2009 (9th)	Edie & Thea: A Very Long Engagement	Susan Muska; Gréta Ólafsdóttir	
2009 (9th)	Gotta Dance	Dori Berinstein	
2009 (9th)	The Philosopher Kings	Patrick Shen	
2009 (9th)	Still Bill	Damani Baker; Alex Vlack	

=== 2010s ===
Year	Film	Director(s)	Ref.
2010 (10th)	Waste Land	Lucy Walker	
2010 (10th)	Client 9: The Rise and Fall of Eliot Spitzer	Alex Gibney	
2010 (10th)	Joan Rivers: A Piece of Work	Ricki Stern; Anne Sundberg	
2010 (10th)	Waiting for "Superman"	Davis Guggenheim	
2010 (10th)	Marwencol	Jeff Malmberg	
2011 (11th)	Bill Cunningham New York	Richard Press	
2011 (11th)	Hot Coffee	Susan Saladoff	
2011 (11th)	The Interrupters	Steve James	
2011 (11th)	Project Nim	James Marsh	
2011 (11th)	Undefeated	Daniel Lindsay; T. J. Martin	
2012 (12th)	Searching for Sugar Man	Malik Bendjelloul	
2012 (12th)	Betting the Farm	Jason Mann; Cecily Pingree	
2012 (12th)	Charles Bradley: Soul of America	Poull Brien	
2012 (12th)	How to Survive a Plague	David France	
2012 (12th)	Surviving Hitler: A Love Story	John Keith Wasson	
2013 (13th)	20 Feet from Stardom	Morgan Neville	
2013 (13th)	Herb & Dorothy 50x50	Megumi Sasaki	
2013 (13th)	Muscle Shoals	Greg "Freddy" Camalier	
2013 (13th)	Running from Crazy	Barbara Kopple	
2013 (13th)	Running Wild: The Life of Dayton O. Hyde	Suzanne Mitchell	
2014 (14th)	Keep On Keepin' On	Alan Hicks	
2014 (14th)	Advanced Style	Lina Plioplyte	
2014 (14th)	Glen Campbell: I'll Be Me	James Keach	
2014 (14th)	Perfect Strangers	Jane Krawitz	
2014 (14th)	The Trials of Muhammad Ali	Bill Siegel	
2015 (15th)	The Last Man on the Moon	Mark Craig	
2015 (15th)	Best of Enemies	Robert Gordon; Morgan Neville	
2015 (15th)	In Transit	Albert Maysles; Lynn True; David Usui	
2015 (15th)	Radical Grace	Rebecca Parrish	
2015 (15th)	Very Semi-Serious	Leah Wolchok	
2016 (16th)	The Beatles: Eight Days a Week	Ron Howard	
2016 (16th)	Big Sonia	Leah Warshawski; Todd Soliday	
2016 (16th)	Everything Is Copy	Jacob Bernstein; Nick Hooker	
2016 (16th)	Maya Angelou: And Still I Rise	Rita Coburn Whack; Bob Hercules	
2016 (16th)	Tower	Keith Maitland	
2017 (17th)	I Am Not Your Negro	Raoul Peck	
2017 (17th)	Dolores	Peter Bratt	
2017 (17th)	Harold and Lillian: A Hollywood Love Story	Daniel Raim	
2017 (17th)	Joan Didion: The Center Will Not Hold	Griffin Dunne	
2017 (17th)	Mission Control: The Unsung Heroes of Apollo	David Fairhead	
2018 (18th)	Won't You Be My Neighbor	Morgan Neville	
2018 (18th)	Amazing Grace	Alan Elliott; Sydney Pollack (uncredited)	
2018 (18th)	Bathtubs Over Broadway	Dava Whisenant	
2018 (18th)	RBG	Betsy West; Julie Cohen	
2018 (18th)	The Rest I Make Up	Michelle Memran	
2019 (19th)	Linda Ronstadt: The Sound of My Voice	Rob Epstein; Jeffrey Friedman	
2019 (19th)	Apollo 11	Todd Douglas Miller	
2019 (19th)	Ask Dr. Ruth	Ryan White	
2019 (19th)	The Apollo	Roger Ross Williams	
2019 (19th)	Toni Morrison: The Pieces I Am	Timothy Greenfield-Sanders	

=== 2020s ===
Year	Film	Director(s)	Ref.
2020/21 (20th)	A Secret Love	Chris Bolan	
2020/21 (20th)	Crip Camp	Nicole Newnham; James Lebrecht	
2020/21 (20th)	Diana Kennedy: Nothing Fancy	Elizabeth Carroll	
2020/21 (20th)	Dick Johnson Is Dead	Kirsten Johnson	
2020/21 (20th)	Sky Blossom	Richard Lui	
2021 (21st)	Summer of Soul (...Or, When the Revolution Could Not Be Televised)	Ahmir "Questlove" Thompson	
2021 (21st)	The Beatles: Get Back	Peter Jackson	
2021 (21st)	Julia	Julie Cohen; Betsy West	
2021 (21st)	My Name is Pauli Murray	Betsy West; Julie Cohen	
2021 (21st)	Who We Are: A Chronicle of Racism in America	Emily Kunstler; Sarah Kunstler	
2022 (22nd)	Gabby Giffords Won't Back Down	Julie Cohen; Betsy West	
2022 (22nd)	Lucy and Desi	Amy Poehler	
2022 (22nd)	The Pez Outlaw	Amy Bandlien Storkel; Bryan Storkel	
2022 (22nd)	Sidney	Reginald Hudlin	
2022 (22nd)	Tony Hawk: Until the Wheels Fall Off	Sam Jones	
2023 (23rd)	Still: A Michael J. Fox Movie	Davis Guggenheim	
2023 (23rd)	Invisible Beauty	Bethann Hardison	
2023 (23rd)	Judy Blume Forever	Davina Pardo Leah Wolchok	
2023 (23rd)	The Lost Weekend: A Love Story	Eve Brandstein	
2023 (23rd)	The Pigeon Tunnel	Errol Morris	
2024 (24th)	Super/Man: The Christopher Reeve Story	Ian Bonhôte; Peter Ettedgui	
2024 (24th)	I Am: Celine Dion	Irene Taylor	
2024 (24th)	Luther: Never Too Much	Dawn Porter	
2024 (24th)	Piece by Piece	Morgan Neville	
2024 (24th)	Will & Harper	Josh Greenbaum	
2025 (25th)	My Mom Jayne	Mariska Hargitay	
2025 (25th)	Becoming Led Zeppelin	Bernard MacMahon	
2025 (25th)	Cover-Up	Laura Poitras	
2025 (25th)	Riefenstahl	Andres Veiel	
2025 (25th)	Stiller & Meara: Nothing Is Lost	Ben Stiller	

== Directors with Multiple Nominations and Wins ==
The following directors have received multiple nominations for Best Documentary:

Wins	Director	Nominations
2	Morgan Neville	3
1	Alex Gibney	2
1	Davis Guggenheim	3
1	James Marsh	2
1	Michael Moore	2
0	Julie Cohen & Betsy West	4
0	Patrick Creadon	2
