= 23rd AARP Movies for Grownups Awards =

Film award ceremony

- Awarded for: Film and television by and about people over 50
- Date: January 17, 2024

Highlights
- Best Film: Killers of the Flower Moon
- Most awards: Killers of the Flower Moon / Nyad (2)
- Most nominations: Oppenheimer (6)

The 23rd AARP Movies for Grownups Awards, presented by AARP: The Magazine, honored films and television series released in 2023. Nominations were announced on January 9, 2024, with Oppenheimer and Killers of the Flower Moon leading the nominations with six and five, respectively.

The winners were announced on January 17, 2024, in the February/March issue of AARP: The Magazine, rather than through an in-person ceremony as in years past.

== Awards ==
=== Winners and nominees ===
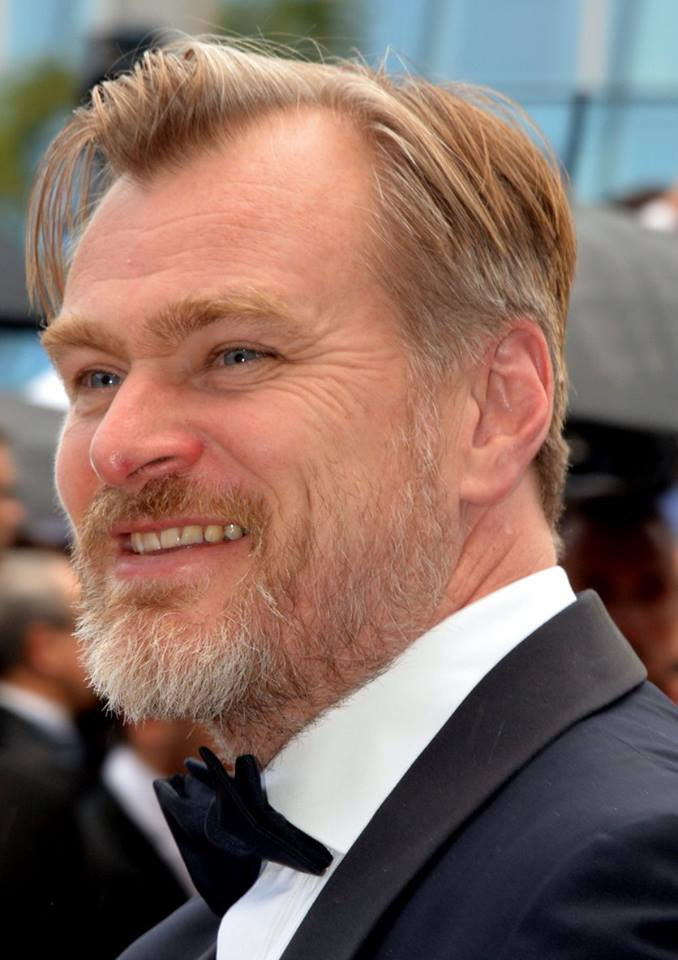
Christopher Nolan, Best Director winner

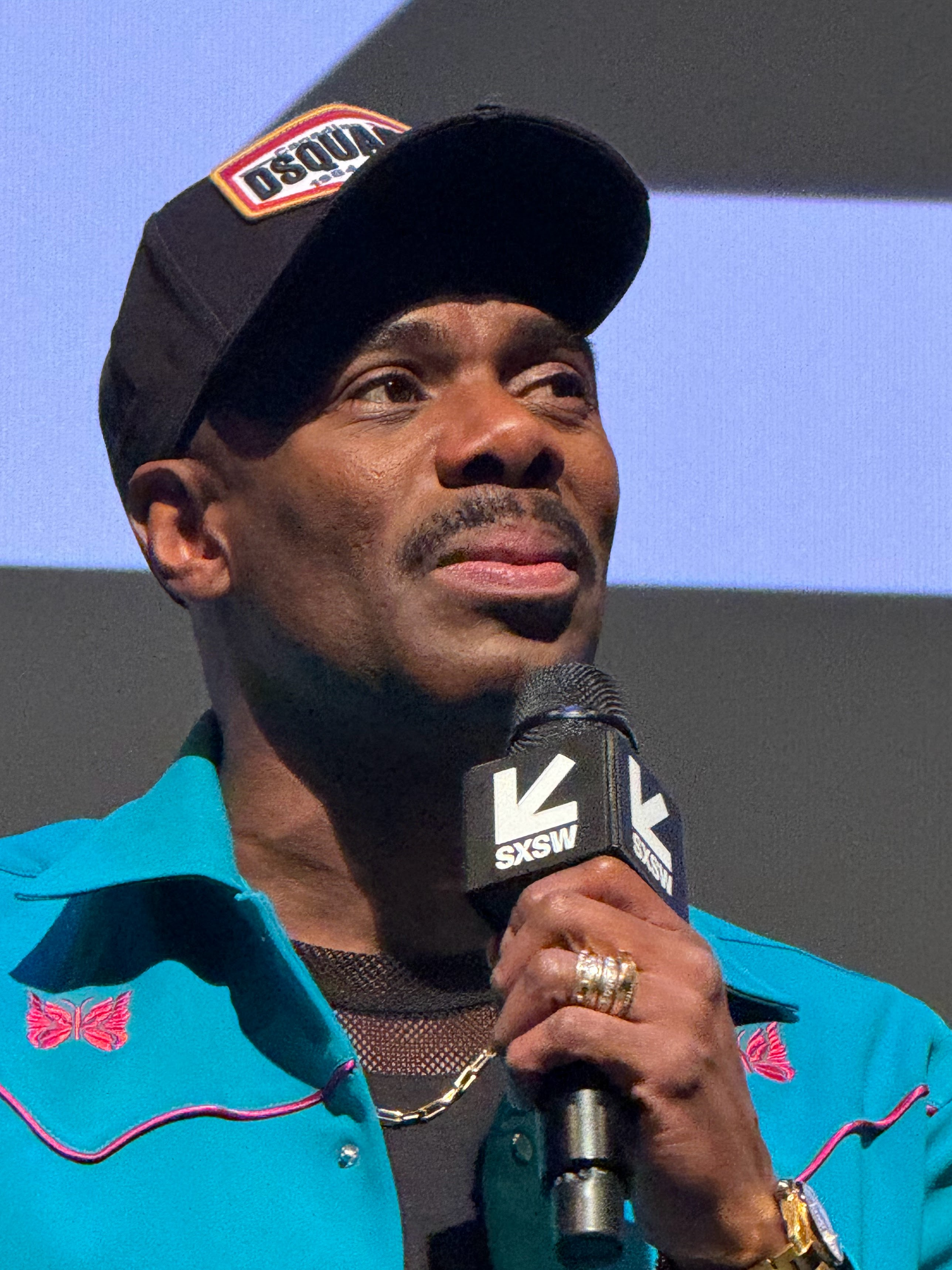
Colman Domingo, Best Actor winner

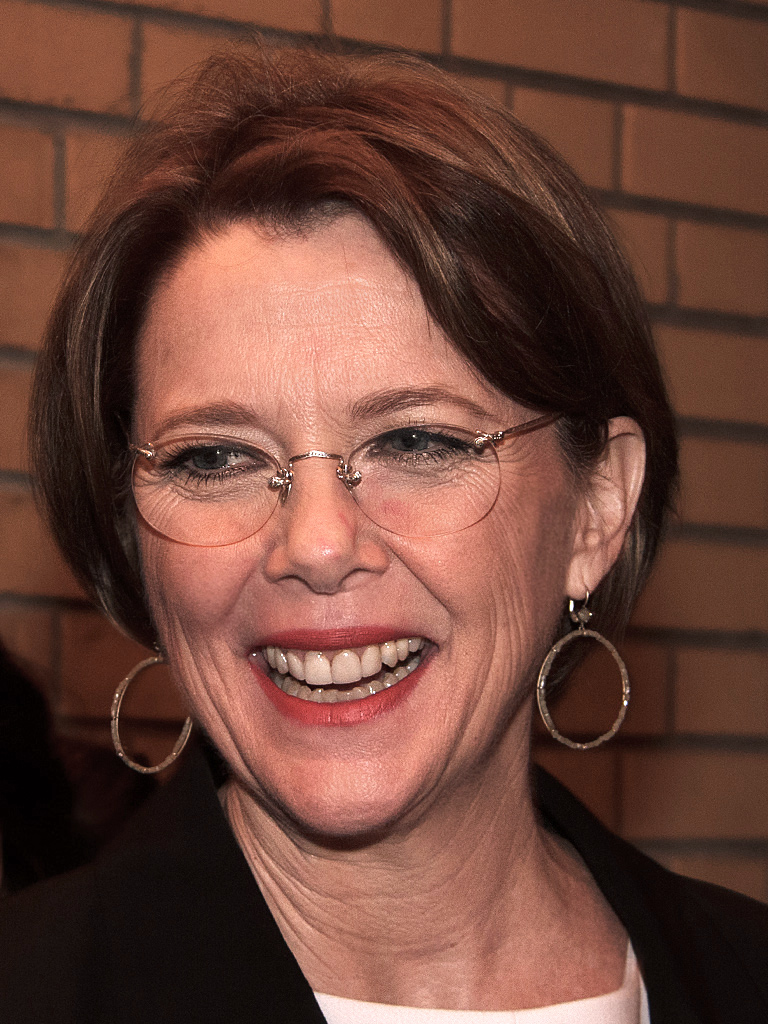
Annette Bening, Best Actress winner

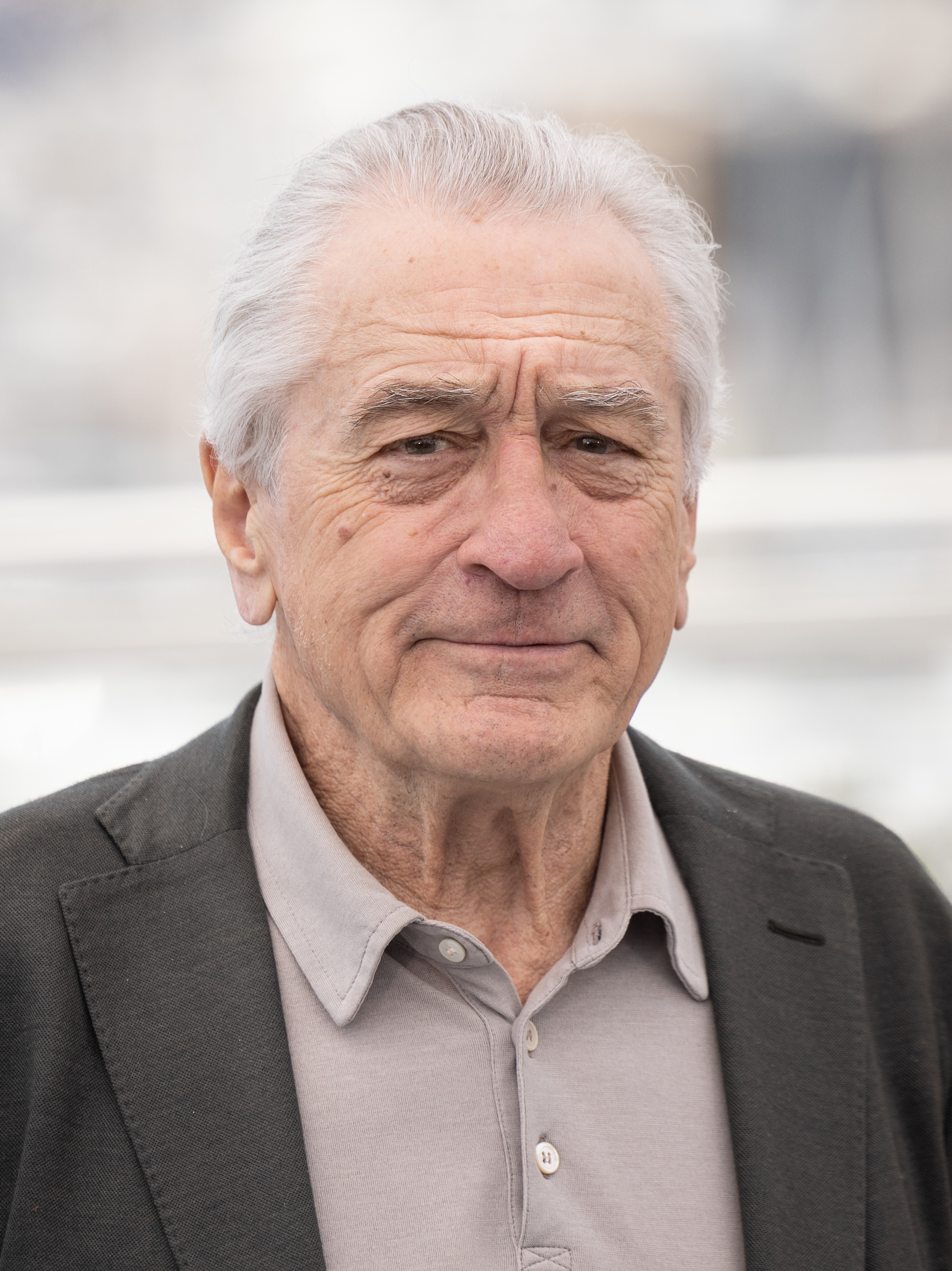
Robert De Niro, Best Supporting Actor winner

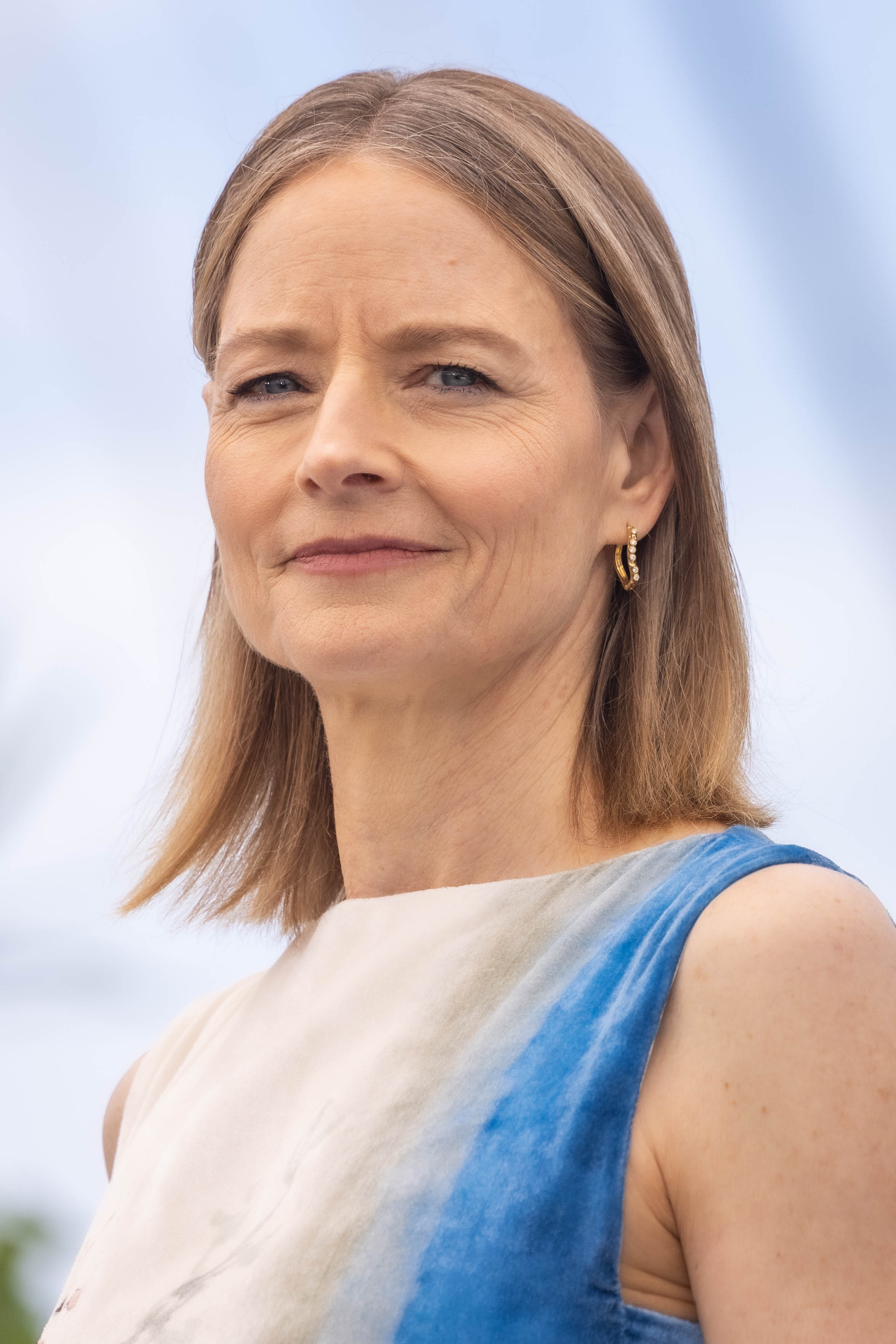
Jodie Foster, Best Supporting Actress winner

Winners are listed first and highlighted in boldface.

**Best Picture**: **Killers of the Flower Moon**; Barbie; The Color Purple; Maestro; Oppenheimer	**Best Director**: **Christopher Nolan – Oppenheimer**; Ben Affleck – Air; Michael Mann – Ferrari; Alexander Payne – The Holdovers; Martin Scorsese – Killers of the Flower Moon
**Best Actor**: **Colman Domingo – Rustin**; Nicolas Cage – Dream Scenario; Paul Giamatti – The Holdovers; Anthony Hopkins – Freud's Last Session; Jeffrey Wright – American Fiction	**Best Actress**: **Annette Bening – Nyad**; Juliette Binoche – The Taste of Things; Aunjanue Ellis-Taylor – Origin; Helen Mirren – Golda; Julia Roberts – Leave the World Behind
**Best Supporting Actor**: **Robert De Niro – Killers of the Flower Moon**; Willem Dafoe – Poor Things; Colman Domingo – The Color Purple; Robert Downey Jr. – Oppenheimer; Mark Ruffalo – Poor Things	**Best Supporting Actress**: **Jodie Foster – Nyad**; Viola Davis – Air; Taraji P. Henson – The Color Purple; Julianne Moore – May December; Leslie Uggams – American Fiction
**Best Screenwriter**: **Noah Baumbach and Greta Gerwig – Barbie**; David Hemingson – The Holdovers; Tony McNamara – Poor Things; Christopher Nolan – Oppenheimer; Martin Scorsese and Eric Roth – Killers of the Flower Moon	**Best Ensemble**: **The Color Purple**; American Fiction; Killers of the Flower Moon; Oppenheimer; Rustin
**Best Intergenerational Movie**: **The Holdovers**; American Fiction; Indiana Jones and the Dial of Destiny; Leave the World Behind; Poor Things	**Best Time Capsule**: **Maestro**; Ferrari; Oppenheimer; Priscilla; Rustin
**Best Documentary**: **Still: A Michael J. Fox Movie**; Invisible Beauty; Judy Blume Forever; The Lost Weekend: A Love Story; The Pigeon Tunnel	**Best Foreign Film**: **The Zone of Interest (United Kingdom)**; Amerikatsi (Armenia); Perfect Days (Japan); Radical (Mexico); The Taste of Things (France)
**Best TV Movie/Series or Limited Series**: **Succession**; The Bear; Fargo; Only Murders in the Building; The White Lotus	**Best Reality TV Series**: **The Golden Bachelor**; The Amazing Race; America's Got Talent; Jury Duty; The Voice
**Best Actor (TV)**: **Bryan Cranston – Your Honor**; Brian Cox – Succession; Oliver Platt – The Bear; Rufus Sewell – The Diplomat; Henry Winkler – Barry	**Best Actress (TV)**: **Jennifer Coolidge – The White Lotus**; Jennifer Aniston – The Morning Show; Jennifer Garner – The Last Thing He Told Me; Imelda Staunton – The Crown; Meryl Streep – Only Murders in the Building

== Multiple nominations ==
=== Films with multiple nominations ===
Films that received multiple nominations
Nominations	Film
6	Oppenheimer
5	Killers of the Flower Moon
4	American Fiction
4	The Holdovers
4	Poor Things
3	The Color Purple
3	Rustin
2	Air
2	Barbie
2	Ferrari
2	Leave the World Behind
2	Maestro
2	Nyad
2	The Taste of Things

=== Series with multiple nominations ===
Series that received multiple nominations
Nominations	Series
2	The Bear
2	Only Murders in the Building
2	Succession
2	The White Lotus
