= AARP Movies for Grownups Award for Best Ensemble =

Annual US film award

- Awarded for: Best film ensemble in a film made by or about people over the age of 50
- Country: United States
- Presented by: AARP
- First award: Get Out (2017)
- Currently held by: One Battle After Another (2025)
- Website: https://www.aarp.org/entertainment/movies-for-grownups/

The AARP Movies for Grownups Award for Best Ensemble is one of the AARP Movies for Grownups Awards presented annually by the AARP. The award honors the best film ensemble in a movie made by or about people over the age of 50. The award for Best Buddy Picture was first given at the 17th AARP Movies for Grownups Awards in 2018.

== Winners and Nominees ==
indicates the winners.

=== 2010s ===
Year	Film	Director(s)	Ref.
2017 (17th)	Get Out‡	Jordan Peele	
2017 (17th)	Girls Trip	Malcolm D. Lee	
2017 (17th)	Last Flag Flying	Richard Linklater	
2017 (17th)	Mudbound	Dee Rees	
2017 (17th)	Murder on the Orient Express	Kenneth Branagh	
2018 (18th)	Bohemian Rhapsody‡	Bryan Singer; Dexter Fletcher (credited as Executive Producer)	
2018 (18th)	Black Panther	Ryan Coogler	
2018 (18th)	Crazy Rich Asians	Jon M. Chu	
2018 (18th)	The Front Runner	Jason Reitman	
2018 (18th)	Widows	Steve McQueen	
2019 (19th)	Knives Out‡	Rian Johnson	
2019 (19th)	Bombshell	Jay Roach	
2019 (19th)	Dolemite Is My Name	Craig Brewer	
2019 (19th)	Downton Abbey	Michael Engler	
2019 (19th)	Little Women	Greta Gerwig	

=== 2020s ===
Year	Film	Director(s)	Ref.
2020/21 (20th)	One Night in Miami...‡	Regina King	
2020/21 (20th)	Da 5 Bloods	Spike Lee	
2020/21 (20th)	Ma Rainey's Black Bottom	George C. Wolfe	
2020/21 (20th)	Promising Young Woman	Emerald Fennell	
2020/21 (20th)	The Trial of the Chicago 7	Aaron Sorkin	
2021 (21st)	Nightmare Alley‡	Guillermo del Toro	
2021 (21st)	Don't Look Up	Adam McKay	
2021 (21st)	The Harder They Fall	Jeymes Samuel	
2021 (21st)	House of Gucci	Ridley Scott	
2021 (21st)	West Side Story	Steven Spielberg	
2022 (22nd)	She Said‡	Maria Schrader	
2022 (22nd)	Glass Onion: A Knives Out Mystery	Rian Johnson	
2022 (22nd)	Nope	Jordan Peele	
2022 (22nd)	The Woman King	Gina Prince-Bythewood	
2022 (22nd)	Women Talking	Sarah Polley	
2023 (23rd)	The Color Purple‡	Blitz Bazawule	
2023 (23rd)	American Fiction	Cord Jefferson	
2023 (23rd)	Killers of the Flower Moon	Martin Scorsese	
2023 (23rd)	Oppenheimer	Christopher Nolan	
2023 (23rd)	Rustin	George C. Wolfe	
2024 (24th)	Sing Sing‡	Greg Kwedar	
2024 (24th)	Beetlejuice Beetlejuice	Tim Burton	
2024 (24th)	A Complete Unknown	James Mangold	
2024 (24th)	His Three Daughters	Azazel Jacobs	
2024 (24th)	September 5	Tim Fehlbaum	
2025 (25th)	One Battle After Another‡	Paul Thomas Anderson	
2025 (25th)	A House of Dynamite	Kathryn Bigelow	
2025 (25th)	Jay Kelly	Noah Baumbach	
2025 (25th)	Nuremberg	James Vanderbilt	
2025 (25th)	Wake Up Dead Man: A Knives Out Mystery	Rian Johnson	
