= 5th AARP Movies for Grownups Awards =

Film award ceremony

- Date: February 7, 2006

Highlights
- Most nominations: Cinderella Man and In Her Shoes (tie) (3)

The 5th AARP Movies for Grownups Awards, presented by AARP the Magazine, honored films released in 2005 made by people over the age of 50. This was the first year that winners were announced at an in-person ceremony instead of being listed only in an issue of AARP the Magazine. The ceremony was hosted by Angela Lansbury and Shelley Berman at the Bel-Air Hotel in Los Angeles on February 7, 2006. Capote won Best Movie for Grownups, and David Strathairn won the award for Breakaway Accomplishment for Good Night, and Good Luck.

This was the last year that the AARP gave out awards for television (in the Best TV Movie category) until 2020. It was the first year an award was given for Best Comedy for Grownups.

== Awards ==
=== Winners and nominees ===
Winners are listed first, highlighted in boldface, and indicated with a double dagger (‡).

**Best Movie for Grownups**: **Capote**‡; Cinderella Man; Crash; Good Night, and Good Luck; Walk the Line	**Best Director**: **Steven Spielberg – Munich**‡; Woody Allen - Match Point; Ron Howard - Cinderella Man; Ang Lee - Brokeback Mountain; Fernando Meirelles - The Constant Gardener
**Best Actor**: **Jeff Daniels - The Squid and the Whale**‡; Anthony Hopkins - The World's Fastest Indian; Kurt Russell - Dreamer: Inspired by a True Story; Nathan Lane - The Producers; Tom Wilkinson - Separate Lies	**Best Actress**: **Joan Plowright - Mrs. Palfrey at the Claremont**‡; Judi Dench - Ladies in Lavender; Shirley MacLaine - In Her Shoes; Meryl Streep - Prime; Liv Ullmann - Saraband
**Best Screenwriter**: **Larry McMurtry and Diana Ossana - Brokeback Mountain**‡; Pedro Almodóvar - Bad Education; Paul Haggis - Crash; Jim Jarmusch - Broken Flowers; Sally Potter - Yes	**Best Movie Time Capsule**: **Cinderella Man**‡; Good Night, and Good Luck; North Country; Capote; Munich
**Best Intergenerational Film**: **Dreamer: Inspired by a True Story**‡; Because of Winn-Dixie; In Her Shoes; Mrs. Palfrey at the Claremont; The Squid and the Whale	**Best Grownup Love Story**: **Craig T. Nelson and Diane Keaton - The Family Stone**‡; Kevin Costner and Joan Allen - The Upside of Anger; Peter Falk and Olympia Dukakis - The Thing About My Folks; Al Pacino and Rene Russo - Two for the Money; The penguin pairs - March of the Penguins
**Best Movie for Grownups Who Refuse to Grow Up**: **King Kong**‡; Batman Begins; The Chronicles of Narnia: The Lion, the Witch, and the Wardrobe; Wallace & Gromit: The Curse of the Were-Rabbit; Wedding Crashers	**Best Comedy for Grownups**: **The Producers**‡; The Family Stone; The 40-Year-Old Virgin; In Her Shoes; Rumor Has It...
**Best Documentary**: **Enron: The Smartest Guys in the Room**‡; Grizzly Man; March of the Penguins; No Direction Home: Bob Dylan; Tell Them Who You Are	**Best Foreign Film**: **Ushpizin - Israel**‡; Bad Education - Spain; Saraband - Sweden; After You... - France; Crónicas - Ecuador
**Best TV Movie**: **The Girl in the Café**‡; Empire Falls; Lackawanna Blues; Sometimes in April; Warm Springs

=== Breakaway accomplishment ===
- David Strathairn: "One of Hollywood's most reliable supporting actors is so good he's scary as Edward R. Murrow."

==== Runners up ====
- Pierce Brosnan for The Matador
- Tommy Lee Jones for directing The Three Burials of Melquiades Estrada
- Kate Montgomery for directing Christmas in the Clouds
- Susan Stroman for directing The Producers

=== Films with multiple nominations ===
Films that received multiple nominations
Nominations	Film
3	Cinderella Man
3	In Her Shoes
2	Bad Education
2	Brokeback Mountain
2	Capote
2	Crash
2	Dreamer: Based on a True Story
2	The Family Stone
2	Good Night, and Good Luck
2	March of the Penguins
2	Mrs. Palfrey at the Claremont
2	Munich
2	The Producers
2	Saraband
2	The Squid and the Whale
