= Irena Salina =

French film director (born 1978)

Irena Salina (born 8 July 1978) was born in Paris and acted in French theatre. She moved to New York City and studied at the Actors Studio. Her first short film, See You on Monday, screened at the Hamptons International Film Festival. She is the niece of actor Philippe Noiret.

Ghost Bird: The Life and Art of Judith Deim (2000), her first documentary film feature, played at a number of festivals, winning the Best Documentary Award at the Fort Lauderdale Film Festival and the President's Award at the Ajijic International Film Festival. Her films are also shown on the Sundance Channel.

She is also the director of Flow: For Love of Water (2008), a documentary about the world water crisis.
