= 20th AARP Movies for Grownups Awards =

Film award ceremony

- Announced on: February 8, 2021
- Presented on: March 28, 2021
- Hosted by: Hoda Kotb

Highlights
- Most awards: The Trial of the Chicago 7 (2)

Television coverage
- Network: PBS

The 20th AARP Movies for Grownups Awards, presented by AARP the Magazine, honored films and television shows released in 2020 and were announced on February 8, 2021. The awards recognized films and television shows created by and about people over the age of 50. Because of the COVID-19 pandemic, that year's awards also included films from the first two months of 2021, and there was no in-person ceremony. Instead, Hoda Kotb hosted a virtual ceremony produced by Great Performances on PBS, which aired on March 28, 2021.

This was the first year that the program included a slate of awards recognizing achievement in television, and the first to include any awards for television since the elimination of the award for TV movie after 2005.

== Awards ==
=== Winners and Nominees ===
Winners are listed first, highlighted in boldface, and indicated with a double dagger (‡).

**Best Movie for Grownups**: **The United States vs. Billie Holiday**‡; Minari; Nomadland; One Night in Miami...; The Trial of the Chicago 7	**Best Director**: **Aaron Sorkin – The Trial of the Chicago 7**‡; Lee Daniels - The United States vs. Billie Holiday; Regina King - One Night in Miami...; Spike Lee - Da 5 Bloods; George C. Wolfe - Ma Rainey's Black Bottom
**Best Actor**: **Anthony Hopkins - The Father**‡; Ralph Fiennes - The Dig; Tom Hanks - News of the World; Delroy Lindo - Da 5 Bloods; Gary Oldman - Mank	**Best Actress**: **Sophia Loren - The Life Ahead**‡; Viola Davis - Ma Rainey's Black Bottom; Frances McDormand - Nomadland; Michelle Pfeiffer - French Exit; Robin Wright - Land
**Best Supporting Actor**: **Demián Bichir - Land**‡; Bill Murray - On the Rocks; Clarke Peters - Da 5 Bloods; Paul Raci - Sound of Metal; Mark Rylance - The Trial of the Chicago 7	**Best Supporting Actress**: **Jodie Foster - The Mauritanian**‡; Candice Bergen - Let Them All Talk; Ellen Burstyn - Pieces of a Woman; Glenn Close - Hillbilly Elegy; Yuh-Jung Youn - Minari
**Best Screenwriter**: **Aaron Sorkin - The Trial of the Chicago 7**‡; Danny Bilson, Paul De Meo, Kevin Willmott, Spike Lee - Da 5 Bloods; Ruben Santiago-Hudson - Ma Rainey's Black Bottom; Paul Greengrass, Luke Davies - News of the World; Kemp Powers - One Night in Miami...	**Best Ensemble**: **One Night in Miami...**‡; Da 5 Bloods; Ma Rainey's Black Bottom; Promising Young Woman; The Trial of the Chicago 7
**Best Intergenerational Film**: **Minari**‡; The Father; Hillbilly Elegy; The Life Ahead; On the Rocks	**Best Buddy Picture**: **Da 5 Bloods**‡; Bad Boys for Life; Bill & Ted Face the Music; Let Them All Talk; Standing Up, Falling Down
**Best Time Capsule**: **Mank**‡; Ma Rainey's Black Bottom; One Night in Miami...; The Trial of the Chicago 7; The United States vs. Billie Holiday	**Best Grownup Love Story**: **Supernova**‡; Emma; Ordinary Love; Wild Mountain Thyme; Working Man
**Best Documentary**: **A Secret Love**‡; Crip Camp; Diana Kennedy: Nothing Fancy; Dick Johnson Is Dead; Sky Blossom: Diaries of the Next Greatest Generation	**Best Foreign Film**: **Collective - Romania**‡; Another Round - Denmark; Bacurau - Brazil; The Life Ahead - Italy; The Weasels' Tale - Argentina
**Best Actor (TV)**: **Mark Ruffalo - I Know This Much is True**‡; Jason Bateman - Ozark; Ted Danson - The Good Place; Hugh Grant - The Undoing; Ethan Hawk - The Good Lord Bird	**Best Actress (TV)**: **Catherine O'Hara - Schitt's Creek**‡; Jennifer Aniston - The Morning Show; Cate Blanchett - Mrs. America; Regina King - Watchmen; Laura Linney - Ozark
**Best TV Series**: **This Is Us**‡; The Crown; Perry Mason; Succession; Ted Lasso	**Best TV Movie/Limited Series**: **The Queen's Gambit**‡; Mrs. America; Small Axe; Unorthodox; Watchmen

=== Career Achievement Award ===
- George Clooney: "He personifies aging with grace, and he proves that with smarts and hard work, even extraordinary talent can improve with time. Clooney, who turns 60 this year, is a slam-dunk argument against ageism."

=== Films with multiple nominations and awards ===
Films that received multiple nominations
Nominations	Film
6	Da 5 Bloods
6	The Trial of the Chicago 7
5	Ma Rainey's Black Bottom
5	One Night in Miami...
3	Minari
3	The United States vs. Billie Holiday
2	The Father
2	Hillbilly Elegy
2	Land
2	Let Them All Talk
2	The Life Ahead
2	Mank
2	News of the World
2	Nomadland
2	On the Rocks

Films that received multiple awards
Wins	Film
2	The Trial of the Chicago 7
