= 2nd AARP Movies for Grownups Awards =

Film award ceremony

- Date: May/June 2003

Highlights
- Most awards: About Schmidt (2)
- Most nominations: The Quiet American (4)

The 2nd AARP Movies for Grownups Awards, presented by AARP the Magazine, honored films released in 2002 made by people over the age of 50. As was customary for the awards at this point, there was no awards ceremony; instead, the winners were announced in 2003's May/June issue of the magazine. Richard Gere won the award for Breakaway Performance for Chicago.

== Awards ==
=== Winners and Nominees ===
Winners are listed first, highlighted in boldface, and indicated with a double dagger (‡).

**Best Movie for Grownups**: **About Schmidt**‡; Far from Heaven; The Hours; The Quiet American	**Best Director**: **Roman Polanski – The Pianist**‡; Phillip Noyce - Rabbit-Proof Fence and The Quiet American; Manoel de Oliveira - I'm Going Home; Martin Scorsese - Gangs of New York; Steven Spielberg - Minority Report and Catch Me If You Can
**Best Actor**: **Jack Nicholson - About Schmidt**‡; Michael Caine - The Quiet American; Dustin Hoffman - Moonlight Mile; Samuel L. Jackson - Changing Lanes	**Best Actress**: **Meryl Streep - Adaptation**‡; Judi Dench - The Importance of Being Earnest; Susan Sarandon - Igby Goes Down and Moonlight Mile; Sigourney Weaver - The Guys
**Best Screenwriter**: **David Hare - The Hours**‡; Jay Cocks - Gangs of New York; Christopher Hampton - The Quiet American; Ronald Harwood - The Pianist	**Best Time Capsule**: **Catch Me If You Can**‡; Confessions of a Dangerous Mind; Far from Heaven; Road to Perdition
**Best Intergenerational Film**: **Road to Perdition**‡; Antwone Fisher; The Hours; My Big Fat Greek Wedding	**Best Grownup Love Story**: **Vanessa Redgrave and Albert Finney - The Gathering Storm**‡; Ellen Burstyn and James Garner - Divine Secrets of the Ya-Ya Sisterhood; Susan Sarandon and Dustin Hoffman - Moonlight Mile; Jill Clayburgh and Jeffrey Tambor - Never Again
**Best Movie for Grownups Who Refuse to Grow Up**: **Spirited Away**‡; Harry Potter and the Chamber of Secrets; Ice Age; Jonah: A VeggieTales Movie	**Best TV Movie**: **Hell on Heels: The Battle of Mary Kay**; Martin and Lewis; Path to War
**Best Documentary**: **Standing in the Shadows of Motown**‡; Bowling for Columbine; Carnauba: A Son's Memoir; Rivers and Tides	**Best Foreign Film**: **Monsoon Wedding - India**‡; The Fast Runner - Canada; I'm Going Home - Portugal and France; Rabbit-Proof Fence - Australia

=== Breakaway Performance ===
- Richard Gere: "Who'd have thought that behind those American Gigolo eyes and that Officer and a Gentleman chin hid the soul of a song-and-dance man? He'll never make us forget Astaire—but we'll never think of Gere in the same way, either."

==== Runners Up ====
- Maggie Smith for Divine Secrets of the Ya-Ya Sisterhood
- Christopher Walken for Catch Me If You Can
- Robin Williams for One Hour Photo

=== Films with multiple nominations and wins ===
Films that received multiple nominations
Nominations	Film
4	The Quiet American
3	Catch Me If You Can
3	The Hours
3	Moonlight Mile
2	About Schmidt
2	Divine Secrets of the Ya-Ya Sisterhood
2	Far from Heaven
2	Gangs of New York
2	I'm Going Home
2	The Pianist
2	Rabbit-Proof Fence
2	Road to Perdition

Films that received multiple awards
Wins	Film
2	About Schmidt
