= AARP Movies for Grownups Awards =

Annual awards since 2002 restricted to people over age 50

- Current: 25th AARP Movies for Grownups Awards
- Awarded for: Best Movie for Audiences 50 and Older
- Country: United States
- Presented by: AARP
- First award: 2002; 24 years ago
- Website: www.aarp.org/entertainment/movies-for-grownups/

The AARP Movies for Grownups Awards are awards given out to "champion films made by and for grownups." Given annually by the AARP, they began in 2002 with the goal of encouraging Hollywood to make more movies by and about people over the age of 50. The first awards were announced in an issue of AARP the Magazine, before transitioning to an annual ceremony in 2006. Since 2018, the awards have been telecast throughout the United States on PBS.

== History ==
The first Movies for Grownups awards were announced in a 2002 issue of AARP the Magazine, recognizing films released in 2001. The first award for Best Movie for Grownups was given to Lantana, while Best Director was awarded to Robert Altman for Gosford Park. Created by the magazine's entertainment editor, Bill Newcott, the awards are chosen by the editors of AARP the Magazine, and all winners and nominees must be at least fifty years old. The original trophy was called La Chaise d'Or, and was a golden statue in the shape of a movie theater chair.

The awards transitioned to a live ceremony in 2006, with that year's event being hosted at the Bel-Air Hotel by Angela Lansbury and Shelley Berman. That year, the award for Best Movie for Grownups was given to Capote.

Starting in 2007, an annual Career Achievement Award was added as part of the ceremony.

In 2015, for the first time, the awards were telecast locally on Los Angeles's KTLA station. In 2018, AARP began an ongoing arrangement to broadcast the awards on PBS as part of the Great Performances series. That year's awards were hosted by Alan Cumming, with Best Movie for Grownups going to Star Wars: The Last Jedi.

The first award for a TV movie was given to Hell on Heels: The Battle of Mary Kay in 2003. TV awards were later discontinued, until the 2021 ceremony, when AARP added new categories to recognize achievement in television as well as film. That year's ceremony was held virtually due to the COVID-19 pandemic, with a limited selection of awards announced in a televised ceremony hosted by Hoda Kotb.

== Categories ==
=== Current Categories - Film ===
- Best Movie for Grownups: since 2002
- Best Director: since 2002
- Best Actor: since 2002
- Best Actress: since 2002
- Best Documentary: since 2002
- Best Screenwriter: since 2003
- Best Intergenerational Film: since 2003
- Best Time Capsule: since 2003 (Note: No award was given for Best Time Capsule for the years of 2007-2010.)
- Best Supporting Actor: since 2008
- Best Supporting Actress: since 2008
- Best Ensemble: since 2018

=== Current Categories - Television ===
- Best Actor: since 2021
- Best Actress: since 2021
- Best TV Series or Limited Series: since 2023

=== Discontinued Categories ===
- Best Movie for Grownups Who Refuse to Grow Up: 2002-2017
- Best Comedy: 2006-2017
- Breakthrough Achievement: 2003-2015
- Reader's Choice: 2020
- Best TV Movie/Limited Series: 2002-2005, 2020-2022 (combined into Best TV Series or Limited Series)
- Best Series: 2020-2022 (combined into Best TV Series or Limited Series)
- Best Buddy Picture: 2008-2022 (Note: No award was given for Best Buddy Picture for films released in 2011, 2017, or 2018. For films from 2019, AARP announced five nominees but did not name a winner.)
- Best Grownup Love Story: 2003-2023 (Note: No award was given for Best Grownup Love Story for 2019.)
- Best Foreign Language Film: 2002-2024
