= AARP: The Magazine =

Magazine

- July/August 2006 cover featuring Colin Powell
- Editor In Chief: Robert Love
- Categories: Lifestyle
- Frequency: Every other month
- Total circulation: 23,428,878 (2015)
- First issue: 1958; 68 years ago (as Modern Maturity); 2002; 24 years ago (as AARP: The Magazine)
- Company: AARP
- Country: United States
- Based in: Washington, D.C., U.S.
- Language: English
- Website: aarpmagazine.org
- ISSN: 1541-9894
- OCLC: 50718933

AARP: The Magazine is an American bi-monthly magazine, published by AARP, which focuses on aging-related issues.

== History and operations ==
In 1958, AARP began publishing a magazine titled Modern Maturity. Modern Maturity was later split into two editions, one for AARP members ages 59–65, and another for members over 65. In spring 2001, AARP began publishing My Generation targeting a younger Baby boomer audience. In 2002, AARP combined the resources of its two publications into a single magazine to be published six times a year called AARP: The Magazine.

The Editor-In-Chief is Robert Love, as of September 2020. Love has held the position since 2013. Prior to AARP, Love held editorial positions at The Week, Reader's Digest, Rodale's Best Life, Playboy, Rolling Stone, and New York.

In the late 1990s, the AARP sought to alter perception about older Americans. One of the first steps was to change the name of the organization's monthly magazine and focus the editorial content on active seniors still in the prime of their lives. Cover subjects were changed from people such as Betty White, who was 77 at the time, to Susan Sarandon, who had recently turned 52. Other cover subjects since then have included Bruce Springsteen, Sally Field, Valerie Bertinelli, Dr. Mehmet Oz, and Dennis Quaid.

The magazine publishes roughly 52 editorial pages six times a year in three separate editions, one for people ages 50–59, one for readers 60–69, and another for those 70+.

== Advertising and circulation ==
At the time of its creation in 2002, AARP: The Magazine combined the circulations of two publications, Modern Maturity with 17.1 million, and MyGeneration with 4 million.

The magazine is sent to every AARP member, and thus is the largest circulation magazine in the United States; it has held that position since the late 1980s. The circulation of the magazine is 23,428,878 copies as of December 2015.

In the second quarter of 2010, AARP: The Magazine sold US$23.9 million in advertising. This represented a 14.5% increase over the same period the year earlier. In 2017, a full-page ad in the magazine cost US$667,800, an 18% increase over the prior five years.

The magazine had a circulation of 22.5 million in 2017. During that same year readership, which is measured by survey, topped 37 million for the first time.

== See also ==
- List of United States magazines
- Media in Washington, D.C.
