= Walmsley =

Walmsley is a surname. Notable people with the surname include:

- Alex Walmsley (born 10 April 1990) is an English professional rugby league footballer.
- Anne Walmsley (1931–2025), British editor, scholar, critic and author
- David Walmsley, Canadian journalist, editor of The Globe and Mail
- David Walmsley, British actor, known for roles in Ben-Hur (2016) and Slow Horses (2022)
- Emma Walmsley (born 1969), British businesswoman, CEO of GlaxoSmithKline
- Ian Walmsley (born 1960), British physicist
- Jim Walmsley (born 1990), American long-distance runner
- Joan Walmsley (born 1943), British Liberal Democrat politician
- John S. Walmsley Jr. (1920–1951), U.S. Air Force bomber pilot, Medal of Honor recipient
- Jon Walmsley (born 1956), British-American musician and actor
- Joshua Walmsley (1794–1871), English businessman and Liberal Party politician
- Kerry Walmsley (born 1973), New Zealand cricketer
- Leo Walmsley (1892–1966), English writer
- Richard Walmsley (born 1962), English record producer and songwriter, member of the Beatmasters and Goldbug
- Robert Walmsley (disambiguation)
- Syd Walmsley (1896–1973), English rugby league footballer
- Thomas Walmsley (disambiguation)
- Wal Walmsley (1916–1978), Australian cricketer

== Places ==
- Walmsley, Virginia, an unincorporated community in Northumberland County
- Walmsley, Western Australia, a locality in the City of Albany
