= Sloughhouse =

Sloughhouse or Slough House may refer to:

- Sloughhouse AVA, a wine region in California
- Sloughhouse, California, an unincorporated community in Sacramento County
- Slough House (novel series), a series of spy thriller novels by Mick Herron
  - Slough House, a fictional office location in Slow Horses, a British TV spy thriller based on the series by Herron
