= Walmesley =

Walmesley is a surname, and may refer to:

- Charles Walmesley (1722–1797), English Roman Catholic bishop
- Richard Walmesley, English cricketer and lawyer
- William Walmesley (1687–1730), English peer

== See also ==
- Walmsley
- Walmisley
