= USC Scripter Awards =

Award honoring authors and screenwriters

- Awarded for: Writing achievements in film adaptation
- Country: United States
- Presented by: University of Southern California (USC)
- First award: 1988; 38 years ago
- Website: libraries.usc.edu/scripter

The USC Scripter Award (Scripter) is the name given to an award presented annually by the University of Southern California (USC) to honor both authors and screenwriters. Starting in 1988, the USC Libraries Board of Councilors award the year's best film adaptation of a printed work, recognizing the original author and the screenwriter.

In 2016, a second Scripter award, for episodic series adaption, was added. The Literary Achievement Award honors significant contributions to storytelling across form, genre, and medium. The Ex Libris Award recognizes long-time supporters of the USC Libraries. The latter two awards are presented on an occasional basis. Per the Scripter Awards website, "Scripter celebrates writers and writing, collaboration, and the profound results of transforming one artistic medium into another. It stands as an emblem of libraries’ ability to inspire creative and scholarly achievement."

== Film ==
=== 1980s ===
Year	Film	Nominees	Source Material
1988	84 Charing Cross Road	Hugh Whitemore	The memoir by Helene Hanff
1988	The Dead	Tony Huston	The short story by James Joyce
1988	Housekeeping	Bill Forsyth	The novel by Marilynne Robinson
1988	The Lonely Passion of Judith Hearne	Peter Nelson	The novel Judith Hearne by Brian Moore
1988	The Princess Bride	William Goldman	The novel by Goldman
1989	The Accidental Tourist	Frank Galati and Lawrence Kasdan	The novel by Anne Tyler
1989	Eight Men Out	John Sayles	The book Eight Men Out: The Black Sox and the 1919 World Series by Eliot Asinof
1989	Everybody's All-American	Thomas Rickman	The book by Frank Deford
1989	Madame Sousatzka	Ruth Prawler Jhabvala and John Schlesinger	The book by Bernice Rubens

=== 1990s ===
Year	Film	Nominees	Source Material
1990	Awakenings	Steven Zaillian	The memoir by Oliver Sacks
1990	Dances with Wolves	Michael Blake	The novel by Blake
1990	Goodfellas	Nicholas Pileggi and Martin Scorsese	The book Wiseguy by Pileggi
1990	Misery	William Goldman	The novel by Stephen King
1990	Presumed Innocent	Frank Pierson and Alan J. Pakula	The novel by Scott Turow
1991	Fried Green Tomatoes	Fannie Flagg and Carol Sobieski	The novel Fried Green Tomatoes at the Whistle Stop Cafe by Flagg
1991	At Play in the Fields of the Lord	Hector Babenco and Jean-Claude Carriere	The novel by Peter Matthiessen
1991	The Prince of Tides	Pat Conroy and Becky Johnston	The novel by Conroy
1991	Rambling Rose	Calder Willingham	The novel by Willingham
1991	The Silence of the Lambs	Ted Tally	The novel by Thomas Harris
1992	A River Runs Through It	Richard Friedenberg	The novella by Norman Maclean
1992	Enchanted April	Peter Barnes	The novel by Elizabeth von Arnim
1992	Howards End	Ruth Prawler Jhabvala	The novel by E.M. Forestor
1992	Malcolm X	Arnold Perl and Spike Lee	The book by Malcolm X and Alex Haley
1992	The Player	Michael Tolkin	The novel by Tolkin
1993	Schindler's List	Steven Zaillian	The novel Schindler's Ark by Thomas Keneally
1993	The Age of Innocence	Jay Cocks and Martin Scorsese	The novel by Edith Wharton
1993	The Joy Luck Club	Amy Tan and Ronald Bass	The novel by Tan
1993	The Remains of the Day	Ruth Prawer Jhabvala	The novel by Kazuo Ishiguro
1993	Searching for Bobby Fischer	Steve Zaillian	The novel Searching for Bobby Fischer: The Father of a Prodigy Observes the World of Chess by Fred Waitzkin
1994	The Shawshank Redemption	Frank Darabont	The short story Rita Hayworth and Shawshank Redemption by Stephen King
1994	Forrest Gump	Eric Roth	The novel by Winston Groom
1994	Little Women	Robin Swicord	The novel by Louisa May Alcott
1994	Nobody's Fool	Robert Benton	The novel by Richard Russo
1994	Quiz Show	Paul Attanasio	The memoir Remembering America: A Voice From the Sixties by Richard Goodwin
1995	Sense and Sensibility	Emma Thompson	The novel by Jane Austen
1995	Apollo 13	William Broyles Jr. and Al Reinert	The book Lost Moon by Jim Lovell and Jeffry Kluger
1995	Carrington	Christopher Hampton	The book Lytton Strachey by Michael Holroyd
1995	Devil in a Blue Dress	Carl Franklin	The book by Walter Mosley
1995	Get Shorty	Scott Frank	The novel by Elmore Leonard
1996	The English Patient	Anthony Minghella	The novel by Michael Ondaatje
1996	Cold Comfort Farm	Malcolm Bradbury	The novel by Stella Gibbons
1996	Dead Man Walking	Tim Robbins	The book by Helen Prejean
1996	Emma	Douglas McGrath	The novel by Jane Austen
1996	The Portrait of a Lady	Laura Jones	The novel by Henry James
1997	L.A. Confidential	Curtis Hanson and Brian Helgeland	The novel by James Ellroy
1997	Donnie Brasco	Paul Attanasio	The book Donnie Brasco: My Undercover Life in the Mafia by Joseph D. Pistone and Richard Woodley
1997	The Rainmaker	Francis Ford Coppola	The novel by John Grisham
1997	The Sweet Hereafter	Atom Egoyan	The novel by Russell Banks
1997	The Wings of the Dove	Hossein Amini	The novel by Henry James
1998	A Civil Action	Steven Zaillian	The book by Jonathan Harr
1998	Gods and Monsters	Bill Condon	The novel Father of Frankenstein by Christopher Bram
1998	Primary Colors	Elaine May	The book Primary Colors: A Novel of Politics by Joe Klein
1998	A Simple Plan	Scott B. Smith	The novel by Smith
1998	The Thin Red Line	Terrence Malick	The novel by James Jones
1999	The Hurricane	Armyan Bernstein and Dan Gordon	The autobiography The Sixteenth Round: From Number 1 Contender To 45472 by Rubin Carter; the book Lazarus and the Hurricane: The Freeing of Rubin "The Hurricane" Carter by Sam Chaiton and Terry Swinton
1999	The Cider House Rules	John Irving	The novel by Irving
1999	The End of the Affair	Neil Jordan	The novel by Graham Greene
1999	The Green Mile	Frank Darabont	The novel by Stephen King
1999	The Talented Mr. Ripley	Anthony Minghella	The novel by Patricia Highsmith

=== 2000s ===
Year	Film	Nominees	Source Material
2000	Wonder Boys	Steve Kloves	The book by Michael Chabon
2000	All the Pretty Horses	Ted Tally	The novel by Cormac McCarthy
2000	Chocolat	Robert Nelson Jacobs	The novel by Joanne Harris
2000	High Fidelity	D. V. DeVincentis, Steve Pink, John Cusack, and Scott Rosenberg	The novel by Nick Hornby
2000	The House of Mirth	Terence Davies	The novel by Edith Wharton
2001	A Beautiful Mind	Akiva Goldsman	The book by Sylvia Nasar
2001	Bridget Jones's Diary	Andrew Davies, Helen Fielding, and Richard Curtis	The novel by Fielding
2001	In the Bedroom	Robert Festinger and Todd Field	The short story Killings by Andre Dubus
2001	The Lord of the Rings: The Fellowship of the Ring	Fran Walsh, Peter Jackson, and Philippa Boyens	The novel The Fellowship of the Ring by J. R. R. Tolkien
2001	The Shipping News	Robert Nelson Jacobs	The novel by E. Annie Proulx
2002	The Hours	David Hare	The novel by Michael Cunningham
2002	About Schmidt	Alexander Payne and Jim Taylor	The novel by Louis Begley
2002	Adaptation	Charlie Kaufman	The book The Orchid Thief by Susan Orlean
2002	The Lord of the Rings: The Two Towers	Fran Walsh, Stephen Sinclair, Peter Jackson, and Philippa Boyens	The novel The Two Towers by J. R. R. Tolkien
2002	The Pianist	Ronald Harwood	The memoir by Władysław Szpilman
2003	Mystic River	Brian Helgeland	The novel by Dennis Lehane
2003	Seabiscuit	Gary Ross	The book Seabiscuit: An American Legend by Laura Hillenbrand
2003	Cold Mountain	Anthony Minghella	The novel by Charles Frazier
2003	The Lord of the Rings: The Return of the King	Fran Walsh, Peter Jackson, and Philippa Boyens	The novel Return of the King by J. R. R. Tolkien
2003	Master and Commander: The Far Side of the World	Peter Weir and John Collee	The novel by Patrick O'Brian
2004	Million Dollar Baby	Paul Haggis	The book Rope Burns: Stories from the Corner by F.X. Toole
2004	The Bourne Supremacy	Tony Gilroy	The novel by Robert Ludlum
2004	The Door in the Floor	Tod Williams	The novel A Widow for One Year by John Irving
2004	Friday Night Lights	Peter Berg, Buzz Bissinger, and David Aaron Cohen	The book Friday Night Lights: A Town, a Team, and a Dream by H. G. Bissinger
2004	Sideways	Alexander Payne and Jim Taylor	The novel by Rex Pickett
2005	Capote	Dan Futterman	The novel by Gerald Clarke
2005	Brokeback Mountain	Larry McMurtry and Diana Ossana	The short story by E. Annie Proulx
2005	The Constant Gardener	Jeffrey Caine	The novel by John le Carré
2005	A History of Violence	Josh Olson	The graphic novel by John Wagner and Vince Locke
2005	Syriana	Stephen Gaghan	The memoir See No Evil by Robert Baer
2006	Children of Men	David Arata, Alfonso Cuarón, Mark Fergus, Hawk Ostby, and Timothy J. Sexton	The novel The Children of Men by P. D. James
2006	The Devil Wears Prada	Aline Brosh McKenna	The novel by Lauren Weisberger
2006	The Illusionist	Neil Burger	The short story Eisenheim the Illusionist by Steven Millhauser
2006	The Last King of Scotland	Jeremy Brock and Peter Morgan	The novel by Giles Foden
2006	Notes on a Scandal	Patrick Marber	The novel by Zoë Heller
2007	No Country for Old Men	Joel Coen and Ethan Coen	The novel by Cormac McCarthy
2007	Atonement	Christopher Hampton	The novel by Ian McEwan
2007	Into the Wild	Sean Penn	The book by Jon Krakauer
2007	There Will Be Blood	Paul Thomas Anderson	The novel Oil! by Upton Sinclair
2007	Zodiac	James Vanderbilt	The book by Robert Graysmith
2008	Slumdog Millionaire	Simon Beaufoy	The novel Q & A by Vikas Swarup
2008	The Curious Case of Benjamin Button	Eric Roth and Robin Swicord	The short story by F. Scott Fitzgerald
2008	Iron Man	Mark Fergus, Hawk Ostby, Art Marcum and Matt Holloway	The comic by Stan Lee, Larry Lieber, Don Heck, and Jack Kirby
2008	The Reader	David Hare	The novel by Bernhard Schlink
2008	Revolutionary Road	Justin Haythe	The novel by Richard Yates
2009	Up in the Air	Jason Reitman and Sheldon Turner	The novel by Walter Kirn
2009	Crazy Heart	Scott Cooper	The novel by Thomas Cobb
2009	District 9	Neill Blomkamp and Terri Tatchell	The short film Alive in Joburg by Blomkamp
2009	An Education	Nick Hornby	The memoir by Lynn Barber
2009	Precious	Geoffrey S. Fletcher	The novel Push by Sapphire

=== 2010s ===
Year	Film	Nominees	Source Material
2010	The Social Network	Aaron Sorkin	The book The Accidental Billionaires by Ben Mezrich
2010	127 Hours	Simon Beaufoy and Danny Boyle	The book Between a Rock and a Hard Place by Aron Ralston
2010	The Ghost Writer	Robert Harris and Roman Polanski	The novel The Ghost by Harris
2010	True Grit	Joel Coen and Ethan Coen	The novel by Charles Portis
2010	Winter's Bone	Debra Granik and Anne Rosellini	The novel by Daniel Woodrell
2011	The Descendants	Alexander Payne, Jim Rash, and Nat Faxon	The novel by Kaui Hart Hemmings
2011	A Dangerous Method	Christopher Hampton	The play The Talking Cure by Hampton
2011	Jane Eyre	Moira Buffini	The novel by Charlotte Brontë
2011	Moneyball	Aaron Sorkin, Steven Zaillian, and Stan Chervin	The book by Michael Lewis
2011	Tinker Tailor Soldier Spy	Bridget O'Connor and Peter Straughan	The novel by John le Carré
2012	Argo	Chris Terrio	The book The Master of Disguise by Antonio J. Mendez and the article The Great Escape by Joshuah Bearman
2012	Beasts of the Southern Wild	Lucy Alibar and Benh Zeitlin	The play Juicy and Delicious by Alibar
2012	Life of Pi	David Magee	The novel by Yann Martel
2012	Lincoln	Tony Kushner	The book Team of Rivals by Doris Kearns Goodwin
2012	The Perks of Being a Wallflower	Stephen Chbosky	The novel by Chbosky
2012	Silver Linings Playbook	David O. Russell	The novel by Matthew Quick
2013	12 Years a Slave	John Ridley	The memoir by Solomon Northup
2013	Captain Phillips	Billy Ray	The book A Captain's Duty by Richard Phillips and Stephan Talty
2013	Philomena	Steve Coogan and Jeff Pope	The book The Lost Child of Philomena Lee by Martin Sixsmith
2013	The Spectacular Now	Scott Neustadter and Michael H. Weber	The novel by Tim Tharp
2013	What Maisie Knew	Carroll Cartwright and Nancy Doyne	The novel by Henry James
2014	The Imitation Game	Graham Moore	The book Alan Turing: The Enigma by Andrew Hodges
2014	Gone Girl	Gillian Flynn	The novel by Flynn
2014	Inherent Vice	Paul Thomas Anderson	The novel by Thomas Pynchon
2014	The Theory of Everything	Anthony McCarten	The book Travelling to Infinity: My Life with Stephen Hawking by Jane Hawking
2014	Wild	Nick Hornby	The memoir Wild: From Lost to Found on the Pacific Crest Trail by Cheryl Strayed
2015	The Big Short	Adam McKay and Charles Randolph	The book by Michael Lewis
2015	Brooklyn	Nick Hornby	The novel by Colm Tóibín
2015	The End of the Tour	Donald Margulies	The memoir Although of Course You End Up Becoming Yourself by David Lipsky
2015	The Martian	Drew Goddard	The novel by Andy Weir
2015	Room	Emma Donoghue	The novel by Donoghue
2016	Moonlight	Barry Jenkins	The play In Moonlight Black Boys Look Blue by Tarell Alvin McCraney
2016	Arrival	Eric Heisserer	The short story Story of Your Life by Ted Chiang
2016	Fences	August Wilson	The play by Wilson
2016	Hidden Figures	Theodore Melfi and Allison Schroeder	The book by Margot Lee Shetterly
2016	Lion	Luke Davies	The memoir A Long Way Home by Saroo Brierley and Larry Buttrose
2017	Call Me by Your Name	James Ivory	The novel by André Aciman
2017	The Disaster Artist	Scott Neustadter and Michael H. Weber	The book by Greg Sestero and Tom Bissell
2017	Logan	Scott Frank, Michael Green, and James Mangold	The comics by John Romita Sr. and Len Wein
2017	The Lost City of Z	James Gray	The book by David Grann
2017	Molly's Game	Aaron Sorkin	The memoir by Molly Bloom
2017	Mudbound	Dee Rees and Virgil Williams	The novel by Hillary Jordan
2017	Wonder Woman	Zack Snyder, Allan Heinberg, and Jason Fuchs	The comic by William Moulton Marston
2018	Leave No Trace	Debra Granik and Anne Rosellini	The novel My Abandonment by Peter Rock
2018	Black Panther	Ryan Coogler and Joe Robert Cole	The comics by Stan Lee and Jack Kirby
2018	Can You Ever Forgive Me?	Nicole Holofcener and Jeff Whitty	The memoir by Lee Israel
2018	The Death of Stalin	Armando Iannucci, David Schneider, and Ian Martin	The comics La Mort de Staline by Fabien Nury and Thierry Robin
2018	If Beale Street Could Talk	Barry Jenkins	The novel by James Baldwin
2019	Little Women	Greta Gerwig	The novel by Louisa May Alcott
2019	Dark Waters	Mario Correa and Matthew Michael Carnahan	The article "The Lawyer Who Became DuPont's Worst Nightmare" by Nathaniel Rich
2019	The Irishman	Steven Zaillian	The book I Heard You Paint Houses by Charles Brandt
2019	Jojo Rabbit	Taika Waititi	The novel Caging Skies by Christine Leunens
2019	The Two Popes	Anthony McCarten	The play The Pope by McCarten

=== 2020s ===
Year	Film	Nominees	Source Material
2020	Nomadland	Chloé Zhao	The book Nomadland: Surviving America in the Twenty-First Century by Jessica Bruder
2020	Bad Education	Mike Makowsky	The New York magazine article "The Bad Superintendent" by Robert Kolker
2020	First Cow	Jonathan Raymond and Kelly Reichardt	The novel The Half-Life by Raymond
2020	Ma Rainey's Black Bottom	Ruben Santiago-Hudson	The play by August Wilson
2020	One Night in Miami...	Kemp Powers	The play by Powers
2021	The Lost Daughter	Maggie Gyllenhaal	The novel by Elena Ferrante
2021	Dune	Eric Roth, Jon Spaihts, and Denis Villeneuve	The novel by Frank Herbert
2021	Passing	Rebecca Hall	The novel by Nella Larsen
2021	The Power of the Dog	Jane Campion	The novel by Thomas Savage
2021	The Tragedy of Macbeth	Joel Coen	The play Macbeth by William Shakespeare
2022	Women Talking	Sarah Polley	The novel by Miriam Toews
2022	Guillermo del Toro's Pinocchio	Guillermo del Toro, Patrick McHale, and Matthew Robbins	The fairy tale The Adventures of Pinocchio by Carlo Collodi
2022	Living	Kazuo Ishiguro	The novella The Death of Ivan Ilyich by Leo Tolstoy
2022	She Said	Rebecca Lenkiewicz	The nonfiction book She Said: Breaking the Sexual Harassment Story That Helped Ignite a Movement by Jodi Kantor and Megan Twohey
2022	~~Top Gun: Maverick~~ (nomination withdrawn)	Peter Craig, Ehren Kruger, Justin Marks, Christopher McQuarrie, and Eric Warren	The characters from the 1983 California magazine article "Top Guns" by Ehud Yonay
2023	American Fiction	Cord Jefferson	The novel Erasure by Percival Everett
2023	Killers of the Flower Moon	Eric Roth and Martin Scorsese	The nonfiction book by David Grann
2023	Oppenheimer	Christopher Nolan	The nonfiction book American Prometheus by Kai Bird and Martin J. Sherwin
2023	Origin	Ava DuVernay	The nonfiction book Caste: The Origins of Our Discontents by Isabel Wilkerson
2023	Poor Things	Tony McNamara	The novel by Alasdair Gray
2024	Conclave	Peter Straughan	The novel by Robert Harris
2024	A Complete Unknown	James Mangold and Jay Cocks	The book Dylan Goes Electric! by Elijah Wald
2024	Nickel Boys	RaMell Ross and Joslyn Barnes	The novel by Colson Whitehead
2024	Sing Sing	Clint Bentley, Greg Kwedar, Clarence Maclin, and John "Divine G" Whitfield	The Esquire article "The Sing Sing Follies" by John H. Richardson
2024	The Wild Robot	Chris Sanders and Peter Brown	The novel by Peter Brown
2025	One Battle After Another	Paul Thomas Anderson	The novel Vineland by Thomas Pynchon
2025	Hamnet	Chloé Zhao and Maggie O'Farrell	The novel by O'Farrell
2025	Frankenstein	Guillermo del Toro	The novel by Mary Shelley
2025	Peter Hujar's Day	Ira Sachs	The novel by Linda Rosenkrantz
2025	Train Dreams	Clint Bentley and Greg Kwedar	The novel by Denis Johnson

== Television ==
=== 2010s ===
Year	Program	Nominees	Source Material
2015	Show Me a Hero	David Simon and William F. Zorzi	The book by Lisa Belkin
2015	Game of Thrones ("Hardhome")	David Benioff and D. B. Weiss	The series of novels A Song of Ice and Fire by George R. R. Martin
2015	The Leftovers ("Axis Mundi")	Damon Lindelof and Jacqueline Hoyt	The novel by Tom Perrotta
2015	The Man in the High Castle ("The New World")	Frank Spotnitz	The novel by Philip K. Dick
2015	Masters of Sex ("Full Ten Count")	Michelle Ashford	The biography Masters of Sex: The Life and Times of William Masters and Virginia Johnson, the Couple Who Taught America How to Love by Thomas Maier
2016	The Night Manager	David Farr	The novel by John le Carré
2016	The People v. O. J. Simpson: American Crime Story ("Manna from Heaven")	Scott Alexander and Larry Karaszewski	The book The Run of His Life: The People v. O. J. Simpson by Jeffrey Toobin
2016	Game of Thrones ("The Winds of Winter")	David Benioff and D. B. Weiss	The series of novels A Song of Ice and Fire by George R. R. Martin
2016	The Man in the High Castle ("Fallout")	Erik Oleson	The novel by Philip K. Dick
2016	Orange Is the New Black ("Toast Can't Never Be Bread Again")	Tara Herrmann and Jenji Kohan	The memoir Orange Is the New Black: My Year in a Women's Prison by Piper Kerman
2017	The Handmaid's Tale ("Offred")	Bruce Miller	The novel by Margaret Atwood
2017	Big Little Lies ("You Get What You Need")	David E. Kelley	The novel by Liane Moriarty
2017	Alias Grace	Sarah Polley	The novel by Margaret Atwood
2017	Genius ("Einstein: Chapter One")	Noah Pink and Ken Biller	The book Einstein: His Life and Universe by Walter Isaacson
2017	The Immortal Life of Henrietta Lacks	Peter Landesman, Alexander Woo and George C. Wolfe	The book by Rebecca Skloot
2017	Mindhunter ("Chapter 10")	Joe Penhall and Jennifer Haley	The book Mindhunter: Inside the FBI's Elite Serial Crime Unit by John Douglas and Mark Olshaker
2018	A Very English Scandal	Russell T Davies	The book by John Preston
2018	The Assassination of Gianni Versace: American Crime Story ("The Man Who Would Be Vogue")	Tom Rob Smith	The book Vulgar Favors: Andrew Cunanan, Gianni Versace, and the Largest Failed Manhunt in U.S. History by Maureen Orth
2018	The Handmaid's Tale ("Holly")	Bruce Miller and Kira Snyder	The novel by Margaret Atwood
2018	The Looming Tower ("9/11")	Dan Futterman and Ali Selim	The novel by Lawrence Wright
2018	Patrick Melrose ("Bad News")	David Nicholls	The novels by Edward St Aubyn
2018	Sharp Objects ("Vanish")	Marti Noxon	The novel by Gillian Flynn
2019	Fleabag	Phoebe Waller-Bridge	The one-woman show by Waller-Bridge
2019	Fosse/Verdon ("Nowadays")	Joel Fields and Steven Levenson	The biography Fosse by Sam Wasson
2019	Killing Eve ("Nice and Neat")	Emerald Fennell	The novella series Codename Villanelle by Luke Jennings
2019	Unbelievable ("Episode 1")	Susannah Grant, Michael Chabon and Ayelet Waldman	The news article "An Unbelievable Story of Rape" by T. Christian Miller and Ken Armstrong
2019	Watchmen ("This Extraordinary Being")	Damon Lindelof and Cord Jefferson	The comic by Alan Moore and Dave Gibbons

=== 2020s ===
Year	Program	Nominees	Source Material
2020	The Queen's Gambit ("Openings")	Scott Frank	The novel by Walter Tevis
2020	The Good Lord Bird ("Meet the Lord")	Mark Richard and Ethan Hawke	The novel by James McBride
2020	Normal People ("Episode 5")	Sally Rooney and Alice Birch	The novel by Rooney
2020	The Plot Against America ("Part 6")	Ed Burns and David Simon	The novel by Philip Roth
2020	Unorthodox ("Part 1")	Anna Winger	The autobiography Unorthodox: The Scandalous Rejection of My Hasidic Roots by Deborah Feldman
2021	Dopesick (“The People vs. Purdue Pharma")	Danny Strong	The nonfiction book Dopesick: Dealers, Doctors, and the Drug Company that Addicted America by Beth Macy
2021	Maid ("Dollar Store")	Molly Smith Metzler	The memoir Maid: Hard Work, Low Pay and a Mother's Will to Survive by Stephanie Land by Stephanie Land
2021	Station Eleven ("Wheel of Fire")	Patrick Somerville	The novel by Emily St. John Mandel
2021	The Underground Railroad ("Indiana Winter")	Barry Jenkins	The novel by Colson Whitehead
2021	WandaVision ("Filmed Before a Live Studio Audience")	Jac Schaeffer	The Marvel Comics characters of the name same created by Stan Lee and Jack Kirby
2022	Slow Horses ("Failure's Contagious")	Will Smith	The novel by Mick Herron
2022	The Crown ("Couple 31")	Peter Morgan	The play The Audience by Peter Morgan
2022	Fleishman Is in Trouble ("The Liver")	Taffy Brodesser-Akner	The novel by Taffy Brodesser-Akner
2022	Tokyo Vice ("Yoshino")	J. T. Rogers	The memoir Tokyo Vice: An American Reporter on the Police Beat in Japan by Jake Adelstein
2022	Under the Banner of Heaven ("When God Was Love")	Dustin Lance Black	The nonfiction book by Jon Krakauer
2023	Slow Horses ("Negotiating With Tigers")	Will Smith	The novel by Mick Herron
2023	The Crown ("Sleep, Dearie Sleep")	Peter Morgan	The play The Audience by Peter Morgan
2023	Daisy Jones & the Six ("Track 5: Fire")	Scott Neustadter	The novel by Taylor Jenkins Reid
2023	The Last of Us ("Long, Long Time")	Craig Mazin	The video game by Neil Druckmann and Naughty Dog
2023	Winning Time: The Rise of the Lakers Dynasty ("The New World")	Max Borenstein, Rodney Barnes, and Jim Hecht	The nonfiction work Showtime by Jeff Pearlman
2024	Say Nothing ("The People in the Dirt")	Joshua Zetumer	The book by Patrick Radden Keefe
2024	Baby Reindeer ("Episode 6")	Richard Gadd	The autobiographical one-man show by Richard Gadd
2024	Ripley ("V Lucio")	Steven Zaillian	The novel The Talented Mr. Ripley by Patricia Highsmith
2024	Shōgun ("Anjin")	Rachel Kondo and Justin Marks	The novel by James Clavell
2024	Slow Horses ("Hello Goodbye")	Will Smith	The novel Spook Street by Mick Herron
2025	Death by Lightning ("Destiny of the Republic")	Mike Makowsky	The book Destiny of the Republic: A Tale of Madness, Medicine, and the Murder of a President by Candice Millard
2025	Dark Winds ("Ábidoo'niidę́ę́ (What We Had Been Told)")	Max Hurwitz and Billy Luther	The novels Dance Hall of the Dead and The Sinister Pig by Tony Hillerman
2025	Dept. Q ("Episode 1")	Chandni Lakhani and Scott Frank	The novel The Keeper of Lost Causes by Jussi Adler-Olsen
2025	Slow Horses ("Scars")	Will Smith	The novel London Rules by Mick Herron
2025	Wolf Hall: The Mirror and the Light	Peter Straughan	The novel The Mirror & the Light by Hilary Mantel

== Literary Achievement ==
- 2008 – Steven Zaillian
- 2009 – Michael Chabon
- 2010 – Eric Roth
- 2011 – Dennis Lehane
- 2012 – Paul Haggis
- 2013 – Diana Ossana and Larry McMurtry
- 2014 – Robert Towne
- 2015 – Walter Mosley
- 2018 – Francis Ford Coppola
- 2020 – Susan Orlean
- 2022 – Barry Jenkins
- 2026 – Michael Connelly

== Ex Libris ==
- 2015 – Elaine Leventhal
- 2017 – Kathleen McCarthy Kostlan
- 2018 – Valerie and Ronald Sugar
- 2019 – George E. Isaacs
- 2020 – Glenn Sonnenberg
- 2021 – Greg Lucas
- 2023 – James F. Childs
- 2024 – George Cassady
- 2025 – Howard Rodman

== See also ==
- Academy Award for Best Adapted Screenplay
- BAFTA Award for Best Adapted Screenplay
- Writers Guild of America Award for Best Adapted Screenplay
