= Real tiger =

Real Tiger may refer to:

- The Real Tiger, a Hindi-language dubbed version of the 2011 Indian Telugu action-comedy film, Dookudu
- The Real Tiger 2, a Hindi-language dubbed version of the 2016 Indian Telugu action-comedy film Brahmotsavam
- Real Tigers, a 2016 spy novel by Mick Herron
