= Tom Brooke =

English actor (born 1978)

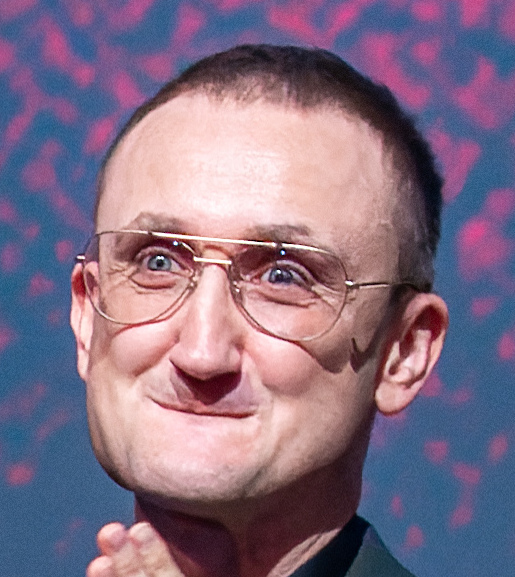
- Brooke in 2022
- Born: 1978 (age 47–48); Berkshire, England
- Education: Hull University; London Academy of Music and Dramatic Art
- Occupation: Actor
- Years active: 2004–present
- Spouse: Fiona Glascott (m. 2014)
- Children: 1
- Parent: Paul Brooke (father)

Thomas Brooke (born 1978) is an English actor. He is best known for playing the roles of Thick Kevin in The Boat That Rocked (2009), Bill Wiggins and Andy Apsted in the BBC One television series Sherlock and Bodyguard respectively, Fiore in the AMC television series Preacher and as MI5 agent J.K. Coe in Slow Horses.

== Early life and education ==
He is the son of actor Paul Brooke. Brooke attended Alleyn's School in Dulwich, London, and Hull University. He trained at the London Academy of Music and Dramatic Art.

== Career ==
Brooke played Bill Wiggins in series 3 of BBC's Sherlock, "Lame" Lothar Frey in season 3 of HBO's Game of Thrones, and Fiore in AMC's Preacher.

In 2011 Brooke played the dimwitted Lee in Jez Butterworth's much-garlanded play Jerusalem at The Royal Court theatre to great acclaim. The following year, he reprised the role in the play's first West End run at The Apollo and was soon after cast in the lead role of the National Theatre's revival of Arnold Wesker's The Kitchen to critical plaudits.

In 2024, Brooke played quiet and reclusive MI5 operative and psychologist, J.K. Coe (known as Coe), in Season 4 of Apple TV's Slow Horses. He returned in season 5 and 6 with a more prominent role in the plot.

== Personal life ==
In 2014, Brooke married Irish actress Fiona Glascott.

== Filmography ==
=== Film ===
| Year | Title | Role |
|---|---|---|
| 2004 | Bridget Jones: The Edge of Reason | Production Assistant |
| 2009 | The Young Victoria | Man on Soap Box |
| 2009 | The Boat That Rocked | Thick Kevin |
| 2011 | The Veteran | Danny Turner |
| 2015 | The Dresser | Oxenby |
| 2017 | The Death of Stalin | Sergei |
| 2017 | How to Talk to Girls at Parties | PT Waldo |
| 2020 | Say Your Prayers | Vic |
| 2022 | Empire of Light | Neil |
| 2026 | Sense and Sensibility (2026 film) | John Dashwood |

=== Television ===
| Year | Title | Role | Notes |
|---|---|---|---|
| 2009 | Pulling | Greg | Episode: "Final Special" |
| 2009 | Hustle | Joel (Diamond expert) | Episode: "Diamond Seeker" |
| 2010 | Thorne: Scaredycat | Martin Palmer | |
| 2010 | Foyles War | Tom Bradley | Episode: The Russian House |
| 2010-2011 | Rock & Chips | DC Martin Stanton | 2 episodes |
| 2012 | The Hollow Crown | Nym | Episode: Henry V |
| 2012 | Mrs. Biggs | Mike Haynes | |
| 2013 | Game of Thrones | "Lame" Lothar Frey | 2 episodes |
| 2013 | Agatha Christie's Poirot | Lawrence Boswell Tysoe | Episode: "The Big Four" |
| 2013 | Ripper Street | John Goode | Episode: "Am I Not Monstrous?" |
| 2014, 2017 | Sherlock | Bill Wiggins | 2 episodes |
| 2016–2019 | Preacher | Fiore | 12 episodes |
| 2017 | Electric Dreams | Tall Man in Light Coat | Episode: "The Commuter" |
| 2018 | Bodyguard | Andy Apsted | 3 episodes |
| 2020 | The Crown | Michael Fagan | Episode: "Fagan" |
| 2024–2026 | Slow Horses | Jason Kevin «JK» Coe | Seasons 4–6 |

== Awards ==
Brooke received the TMA Award for Best Supporting Actor for his performance in The Long and the Short and the Tall at the Sheffield Lyceum in 2006.
