= Cartier Diamond Dagger =

Award given by the Crime Writers' Association of the United Kingdom

The CWA Diamond Dagger is an award given by the Crime Writers' Association of the United Kingdom to authors who have made an outstanding lifetime contribution to the genre.

== Winners ==
- 1986 – Eric Ambler
- 1987 – P. D. James
- 1988 – John le Carré
- 1989 – Dick Francis
- 1990 – Julian Symons
- 1991 – Ruth Rendell
- 1992 – Leslie Charteris
- 1993 – Ellis Peters
- 1994 – Michael Gilbert
- 1995 – Reginald Hill
- 1996 – H. R. F. Keating
- 1997 – Colin Dexter
- 1998 – Ed McBain
- 1999 – Margaret Yorke
- 2000 – Peter Lovesey
- 2001 – Lionel Davidson
- 2002 – Sara Paretsky
- 2003 – Robert Barnard
- 2004 – Lawrence Block
- 2005 – Ian Rankin
- 2006 – Elmore Leonard
- 2007 – John Harvey
- 2008 – Sue Grafton
- 2009 – Andrew Taylor
- 2010 – Val McDermid
- 2011 – Lindsey Davis
- 2012 – Frederick Forsyth
- 2013 – Lee Child
- 2014 – Simon Brett
- 2015 – Catherine Aird
- 2016 – Peter James
- 2017 – Ann Cleeves
- 2018 – Michael Connelly
- 2019 – Robert Goddard
- 2020 – Martin Edwards
- 2021 – Martina Cole
- 2022 – C. J. Sansom
- 2023 – Walter Mosley
- 2024 – James Lee Burke and Lynda La Plante
- 2025 – Mick Herron
- 2026 – Mark Billingham
