= Walmsley, Virginia =

Unincorporated community in Virginia, US

Coordinates: 37°56′28″N 76°32′07″W

Walmsley is an unincorporated community in Northumberland County, in the U.S. state of Virginia.
