= Slow Horses (novel) =

2010 novel by Mick Herron

- First edition
- Author: Mick Herron
- Language: English
- Series: Slough House
- Genre: Spy fiction, Thriller, Comedy
- Publisher: Soho Crime
- Publication date: 2010-06-01
- Publication place: England
- ISBN: 978-1399803052
- Followed by: Dead Lions

Slow Horses is an espionage novel by British writer Mick Herron, published in 2010. It is the first novel in the Slough House series, following River Cartwright and a group of disgraced MI5 officers as they attempt to escape their desk jobs.

== Plot ==
Slough House is an MI5 office – located at 126 Aldergate Street – overseen by Jackson Lamb, a crotchety Cold War era intelligence officer, where "Slow Horses" (disgraced intelligence officers) are relegated to pushing paper and sorting through bins.

Everyone has a reason for being at Slough House. River Cartwright accidentally shut down London King's Cross railway station during a training assessment, a mistake he claimed resulted from being fed false information. Louisa Guy misplaced an arms dealer she was tailing, Min Harper left confidential information on a train, and Roddy Ho has a repulsive personality. Only Sidonie "Sid" Baker, a new officer at Slough House, has unknown origins. Baker starts to be given assignments in the field and quickly attracts the envy of other officers. After she is tasked with following a disgraced conservative journalist, Robert Hobden, Cartwright does everything he can to get involved.

When Hassan Ahmed, a British-Pakistani university student, is kidnapped and held hostage by the white nationalist group Voice of Albion, the officers of Slough House begin to wonder what they can do to help. The kidnappers announce they will behead Ahmed on a live stream in 36 hours. What the officers of Slough House don't know is that the terrorists have been infiltrated by a former Slow Horse, Alan Black, who has been secretly tasked by the deputy director of MI5, Diana Taverner, to sabotage the kidnappers as a publicity stunt for the agency.

Hobden suspects foul play, as he previously overheard Taverner in a bar discussing creating sting operations on far-right political groups. When Hobden begins to make attempts to expose the scheme publicly, Taverner convinces Jed Moody, a discontented Slough House officer with a background in international espionage, to plan an assassination attempt on Hobden. Unbeknownst to Moody, Cartwright and Baker are monitoring Hobden's house the night he attempts a masked break-in. Before noticing the intruder, Baker reveals to Cartwright she was assigned to Slough House to keep him under surveillance. The pair rush to Hobden's defence. A violent scuffle results in Moody accidentally shooting Baker. Hobden and Moody flee into the night, while River rushes Baker to the hospital.

Realising what he's done, Moody returns to Slough House for supplies in preparation to go on the run. Louisa Guy and Min Harper return to work after hours for some private time together and rush to attack the masked intruder. Moody and Harper fall down the office stairs, where Moody dies instantly after breaking his neck on impact. When Jackson Lamb is alerted to the death of two of his crew in one night, he begins to piece together Taverner's meddling in his affairs.

Hobden rushes to the house of Peter Judd, a conservative politician. While Judd is reluctant to help Hobden expose MI5's antics, Hobden threatens to release a compromising photo of a young Judd throwing a Nazi salute.

Meanwhile, the kidnappers have discovered and killed the traitor within their ranks. After they change their plans and take their hostage on the road, Taverner begins to look to hide her involvement. She alerts people within MI5 that one of the kidnappers was a former Slow Horse and tries to pin the situation on Jackson Lamb. Lamb decides to break into the MI5 headquarters with Cartwright to find evidence and confront Taverner with proof she is framing the officers of Slough House.

The other Slow Horses work to track down the van the kidnappers had hired. Working through the known aliases of the former Slough House officer who infiltrated the group, the Slow Horses find the booking. Roddy Ho works out how to hack the rental company's navigation system, and they alert the police of the forest where the kidnappers have stopped. The two remaining kidnappers in the meantime had begun to argue, disagreeing about actually killing Hassan. Hassan uses the opportunity to escape and hide in the forest, where he is saved by the police.

In the days after, it is announced that Robert Hobden died in a hit-and-run accident, and Cartwright discovers all records of Sid Baker have been wiped from existence, her status now unknown.

== Principal characters ==
The book uses third-person limited point of view, with Herron frequently rotating between characters' internal monologues and perspectives.

- River Cartwright, a disgraced MI5 spy who desperately wants to clear his name and prove his place in the organisation.
- Jackson Lamb, an aging Cold War-era spy who manages the operations of Slough House.

"slovenly and his sarcastic tirades and public disparagement of his staff are so outrageous and non-PC that you cannot help but laugh"

- Diana Taverner, serves as second desk and Head of Operations at MI5. ("Lady Di")
- Sidonie "Sid" Baker, the most capable of the officers at Slough House. Her reasons for being sent there are unknown.
- Jed Moody, a Slough House officer who was previously a globe trotting spy.
- Louisa Guy, a former field officer who was sent to work at Slough House after she took the fall for a failed operation.
- Catherine Standish, Jackson Lamb's assistant who previously served under deceased MI5 Director-General Charles Partner.
- Roddy Ho, an arrogant hacker who works at Slough House.
- Min Harper, a Slough House officer who was relegated down the ranks of MI5 after leaving a confidential disk on a train.
- Robert Hobden, a conservative journalist whose affiliation with far-right political groups destroyed his career.
- Alan Black, a former Slow Horse tasked with infiltrating a white nationalist group.
- Hassan Ahmed, a university student kidnapped by a group of white supremacists.

== Publication history ==
Constable first published Slow Horses in the United Kingdom in 2010. The book was published by Soho Press in the United States.

The initial release of the novel was unsuccessful and Constable decided not to publish any further books in the series. In 2015, John Murray acquired the rights to release the novel in the UK and released a new edition. The book began to find mainstream success after Waterstones named the novel its 'thriller of the month' in August 2017.

In 2017, Nancy Pearl included Slow Horses on a list of books she recommended on NPR. Pearl described the book as "great fun" and said "Unlike some series of thrillers or mysteries, it gets better, each book is better than the one before." In response, Soho printed an additional 2,000 copies of the book which sold out in 24 hours; they would go on to sell 20,000 copies that month.

== Background ==
Herron began the book in 2008. Prior to writing Slow Horses, Herron primarily wrote detective fiction whilst he was working in the legal department of an employment-issues research firm.

In 2005, Herron was commuting to work when the London Underground Bombings struck. The experience inspired Herron to shift from writing detective to spy fiction. While he did not feel qualified to write about world events, the bombings made him realise that "to be on the front line, you just have to be in a city. Suddenly, everywhere seems to be a viable target. So that opened the door and allowed me to write about such things." Herron references the morning during a scene where River Cartwright reflects:

People talked about that day in different ways. Either it was a story about them in which bombs happened, or it was a story about the bombs, and they'd just happened to be there.

While Herron did not have any previous experience or knowledge of working in the intelligence community, he cites Len Deighton and John le Carré as influences.

== Reception ==
Writing for The Booklist, Thomas Gaughan said Herron's novel was "filled with acidic wit and engaging misdirection... with enough suspense, double-dealing, and mayhem for thriller devotees; but it's also a wonderfully funny, farcical, deeply cynical skewering of politics, bureaucrats, turf wars, and the Great Game."

Jeff Quest, creator of spy fiction review website Spy Write, praised Herron's cast of characters, saying while they might not be likeable on the surface, "you understand and relate to their motivations and foible." Quest also noted Herron's "ability to capture the truth of city living" and complimented his use of real world locations throughout the story.

The book was listed by Jake Kerridge in The Telegraph as one of "The 20 best spy novels of all time."

The book was shortlisted for the 2010 CWA Ian Fleming Steel Dagger for best thriller of the year.

== Adaptations ==
A series adaptation of the book premiered on Apple TV+ on 1 April 2022. The series stars Gary Oldman as Lamb, Jack Lowden as River Cartwright and Kristin Scott Thomas as Diana Taverner.
