= Slow Horses =

British spy thriller TV series (2022–present)

- Genre: Black comedy; Drama; Spy thriller
- Created by: Will Smith
- Based on: Slough House by Mick Herron
- Written by: Will Smith; Morwenna Banks; Mark Denton; Jonny Stockwood; Sean Gray; Edward Docx; Gaby Chiappe; Sophie Goodhart
- Directed by: James Hawes; Jeremy Lovering; Saul Metzstein; Adam Randall
- Starring: Gary Oldman; Jack Lowden; Kristin Scott Thomas; Sophie Okonedo; Jonathan Pryce; Hugo Weaving; Saskia Reeves; Rosalind Eleazar; Christopher Chung; Aimee-Ffion Edwards; Joanna Scanlan; Lucian Msamati; Tom Brooke; Olivia Cooke
- Theme music composer: Mick Jagger; Daniel Pemberton
- Composers: Daniel Pemberton; Toydrum
- Country of origin: United Kingdom
- Original language: English
- No. of series: 6
- No. of episodes: 36

Production
- Executive producers: Graham Yost; James Hawes; Will Smith; Douglas Urbanski; Gail Mutrux; Iain Canning; Emile Sherman; Jamie Laurenson; Hakan Kousetta; Jane Robertson; Julian Stevens; Gary Oldman; Adam Randall; Mick Herron
- Cinematography: Danny Cohen; David Chizallet; Eben Bolter
- Editors: Katie Weiland; Luke Dunkley; Ben Whitehead; Morten Højbjerg; Sam Williams; Zsófia Tálas; Robert Frost; Harrison Wall; Fiona Brands
- Running time: 39–62 minutes
- Production companies: See-Saw Films; Flying Studio Pictures; Sony Pictures Television Studios (series 1)

Original release
- Network: Apple TV+
- Release: 1 April 2022 – 8 October 2025
- Network: Apple TV
- Release: 15 October 2025 – present

Slow Horses is a British spy thriller television series based on the Slough House novels by Mick Herron, and adapted for television by the English comedian and writer Will Smith. It follows Slough House, an MI5 unit where disgraced or failed agents are consigned, under the supervision of Jackson Lamb (Gary Oldman). It also stars Jack Lowden, Kristin Scott Thomas, Jonathan Pryce, Hugo Weaving, Saskia Reeves, Rosalind Eleazar, Christopher Chung, Aimee-Ffion Edwards, Joanna Scanlan, Tom Brooke, Lucian Msamati, and Olivia Cooke.

The series premiered on Apple TV+ on 1 April 2022 to highly positive reviews. The first six series have adapted the novels Slow Horses, Dead Lions, Real Tigers, Spook Street, London Rules, Joe Country, and Slough House, respectively. All six series have received critical acclaim, with praise for the series' direction, performances, script, tonal balance, and consistency.

Slow Horses has been renewed for a seventh and eighth series, based on the novels Bad Actors (series 7) and Clown Town (series 8), and well as for a ninth and tenth series.

== Premise ==
Slough House is a banishment room for MI5 service rejects who have seriously failed a task but not badly enough to get sacked. Those consigned there are known as "slow horses", a play on the name of the place itself, Slough House, and an expression for people who are slow at thinking and action. Those assigned there are expected to endure dull, routine tasks, along with verbal abuse from their boss, Jackson Lamb, who anticipates that they will leave out of boredom or frustration. Life in Slough House is defined by drudgery, yet the Slow Horses somehow get involved in investigating cases that endanger Britain.

== Cast and characters ==
=== Overview ===
Actor	Character	Seasons					
Actor	Character	1	2	3	4	5	6
Gary Oldman	Jackson Lamb	Main	Main	Main	Main	Main	Main
Jack Lowden	River Cartwright	Main	Main	Main	Main	Main	Main
Kristin Scott Thomas	Diana Taverner	Main	Main	Main	Main	Main	Main
Sophie Okonedo	Ingrid Tearney	Guest (Note: Credited as a special guest star in the opening title sequence of episodes in which they appear)		Main (Note: Only receives main billing in the episodes in which they appear)			
Jonathan Pryce	David Cartwright	Guest	Guest	Main	Main	Main	Main
Hugo Weaving	Frank Harkness				Main		Main (Note: Weaving is credited as co-starring in the first episode of the sixth series and receives main billing in any further episodes in which he appears)
Saskia Reeves	Catherine Standish	Co-starring	Co-starring	Co-starring	Co-starring	Main	Main
Rosalind Eleazar	Louisa Guy	Co-starring	Co-starring	Co-starring	Co-starring	Main	Main
Christopher Chung	Roddy Ho	Co-starring	Co-starring	Co-starring	Co-starring	Main	Main
Aimee-Ffion Edwards	Shirley Dander		Co-starring	Co-starring	Co-starring	Main	Main
Joanna Scanlan	Moira Tregorian				Co-starring		Main
Lucian Msamati	Oliver Nash						Main
Tom Brooke	J.K. Coe				Co-starring	Co-starring	Main
Olivia Cooke	Sid Baker	Co-starring					Main

=== Main ===
- Gary Oldman as Jackson Lamb, the head of Slough House who is unkempt, flatulent and rude with a sour wit, all disguising a tactical sharpness and firm loyalty to his agents.
- Jack Lowden as River Cartwright, an up-and-coming MI5 agent abruptly shunted to Slough House after a very public training-exercise blunder.
- Kristin Scott Thomas as Diana Taverner, the ambitious Deputy Director General of MI5 and head of operations, designated "Second Desk" until the end of series 5 when promoted to "First Desk", Director General of MI5.
- Sophie Okonedo as Ingrid Tearney (series 3; special guest series 1), the Director General of MI5, often referred to as "First Desk".
- Jonathan Pryce as David Cartwright (series 3–6; special guest series 1–2), River's grandfather, and a former senior MI5 official with a legendary reputation, often known as "The Old Bastard".
- Hugo Weaving as Frank Harkness (series 4 and 6), a former CIA operative turned ruthless mercenary and the biological father of River Cartwright.
- Saskia Reeves as Catherine Standish (series 5–present; co-starring series 1–4), Slough House's loyal office administrator, and a recovering alcoholic traumatised by the death of her former boss, Charles Partner.
- Rosalind Eleazar as Louisa Guy (series 5–present; co-starring series 1–4), assigned to Slough House after a tail operation went badly wrong.
- Christopher Chung as Roddy Ho (series 5–present; co-starring series 1–4), an arrogant and obnoxious computer nerd and former hacktivist with undeniable technical skills.
- Aimee-Ffion Edwards as Shirley Dander (series 5–present; co-starring series 2–4), a physically capable agent undone by drug and anger issues.
- Joanna Scanlan as Moira Tregorian (series 6; co-starring series 4), one of the Queens of the Database (record keepers), banished to Slough House by Claude Whelan. She becomes Catherine's temporary replacement.
- Lucian Msamati as Oliver Nash (series 6), the chairman of the Limitations Committee overseeing MI5's activities.
- Tom Brooke as J.K. Coe (series 6; co-starring series 4–5), the newest "Slow Horse" and former operative from Psych Eval. He is reclusive and has PTSD.
- Olivia Cooke as Sidonie "Sid" Baker (series 6; co-starring series 1), a competent, likable MI5 agent inexplicably assigned to Slough House.

=== Special guests ===
- Katherine Waterston as Alison Dunn (series 3), an MI5 agent who uncovers a dark secret at the heart of the agency.
- Sope Dirisu as Sean Donovan (series 3), a former head of security at the British embassy in Istanbul.

=== Slough House ===
- Dustin Demri-Burns as Min Harper (series 1–2), assigned after absent-mindedly leaving a top-secret disk on the train.
- Paul Higgins as Struan Loy (series 1 and 6), assigned after sending an inappropriate work email.
- Steven Waddington as Jed Moody (series 1), a bitter and abrasive former Dog who resents Lamb and wants his old status back.
- Kadiff Kirwan as Marcus Longridge (series 2–4), who tends to gamble on the job.

=== Others ===
Notable other characters include:

More than one series

- Chris Reilly as Nick Duffy (series 1–3), head of MI5's internal affairs and ruthless tactical unit nicknamed the "Dogs".
- Chris Coghill as Hobbs (series 1 and 3), a member of the Dogs.
- Samuel West as Peter Judd MP (series 1–3 and 5–6), a ruthlessly ambitious right-wing Conservative politician who is later promoted to Home Secretary.
- Freddie Fox as James "Spider" Webb (series 1–3), a smug MI5 agent based at Regent's Park headquarters.
- Naomi Wirthner as Molly Doran (series 2–present), an ill-tempered MI5 records keeper at Regent's Park.
- Sean Gilder as "Bad" Sam Chapman (series 2–4), former Head Dog and David Cartwright's bodyguard turned private detective, whom Lamb continues to consult.
- Ruth Bradley as Emma Flyte (series 4–6), the straight-minded new head of the Dogs.
- James Callis as Claude Whelan (series 4–5 and 7), the bumbling, over-promoted new Director General of MI5 or "First Desk".
- Merab Ninidze as Vassily Rasnakov (series 6–7), First Desk of Russia's GRU.

Series 1

- Antonio Aakeel as Hassan Ahmed, Leeds University student kidnapped by the Sons of Albion, an extremist far-right group.
- Paul Hilton as Robert Hobden, a disgraced and struggling journalist with ties to extremist far-right groups.
- Sam Hazeldine as Moe / Alan Black, the leader of the subgroup of the Sons of Albion that kidnaps Hassan Ahmed, with a secret to hide.
- Brian Vernel as Curly, a fanatical member of the Sons of Albion.
- Stephen Walters as Zeppo, a member of the Sons of Albion.
- David Walmsley as Larry, a member of the Sons of Albion.
- James Faulkner as Charles Partner, the deceased former Director General of MI5 during the Cold War, whom Standish worked for as his personal assistant.

Series 2

- Rade Šerbedžija as Nikolai Katinsky, a former KGB agent living in exile in London after defecting at the end of the Cold War.
- Marek Vašut as Andre Chernitsky, a former KGB operative and assassin who operated during the Cold War.
- Alec Utgoff as Arkady Pashkin, a fixer for oligarch Ilya Nevsky.
- Catherine McCormack as Alex Tropper, a local resident in the small village of Upshott, the wife of Duncan and mother of Kelly.
- Adrian Rawlins as Duncan Tropper, a pub owner in Upshott, the husband of Alex and father of Kelly.
- Tamsin Topolski as Kelly Tropper, a pub barmaid in Upshott and the daughter of Alex and Duncan.
- Phil Davis as Richard Bough, aka Dickie Bow, a former MI5 officer, who was disgraced and is long since retired.

Series 3

- Siôn Daniel Young as Douglas, an eccentric MI5 records keeper.
- Charlie Rowe as Ben, a member of Donovan's team.
- Eliot Salt as Sarah, a member of Donovan's team.
- Gavin Spokes as Sly Monteith, head of the private security firm Chieftain.
- Nick Blood as Sturges, a Chieftain operative.

Series 4

- Kiran Sonia Sawar as Giti Rahman, an MI5 agent at Regent's Park.
- Tom Wozniczka as Patrice, a mercenary working under Harkness.
- Anna Wilson-Jones (voice) as Isobel Cartwright, River's mother and David's daughter.

Series 5

- Nick Mohammed as Zafar Jaffrey, the Mayor of London who is seeking reelection.
- Hiba Bennani as Tara Younis, Roddy's apparent girlfriend.
- Christopher Villiers as Dennis Gimball, a firebrand right-wing MP running for Mayor. Villiers previously had a cameo as a different far-right politician, Roger Simmonds, in series 1.
- Victoria Hamilton as Dodie Gimball, Dennis's wife and campaign manager who writes for a tabloid newspaper.
- Cherrelle Skeete as Devon Welles, Flyte's deputy and fellow former Met officer turned Dog.
- Monty Ben as Farouk, the leader of a Libyan terrorist cell staging attacks across London as part of a destabilisation campaign.
- Fady Elsayed as Kamal, a member of Farouk's group.
- Ahmed Elmusrati as Sami, a member of Farouk's group.
- Abraham Popoola as Tyson Bowman, Jaffrey's chief of staff.

Series 6

- Kyle Soller as Jim, an assassin hunting Slough House agents.
- MyAnna Buring as Jane, an assassin hunting Slough House agents.
- Harry Lloyd as Damien Cantor, a right-wing media mogul and news channel owner.
- Dylan Smith as Andrew Nesmith, a former Dog with stolen critical intel.
- Lenny Rush as Reece Nesmith, a child witness and Andrew's son.
- Barbara Marten as Anne, an elderly lady who shelters River and Sid.
- Zrinka Cvitešić as Natasha Carrington, Cantor's Russian handler.
- Ben Tavassoli as Cyrus, one of Harkness' mercenaries.
- Niall Wright as Anton, one of Harkness' mercenaries.

Series 7

- Varada Sethu
- Ethan Moorhouse
- Tuppence Middleton
- Joshua McGuire as Anthony Sparrow, an advisor to the Prime Minister.
- Hilton McRae

== Episodes ==
=== Series overview ===
Series	Episodes	Originally released			Adapted novel(s)	Director
Series	Episodes	First released	Last released	Network	Adapted novel(s)	Director
1	6	1 April 2022	29 April 2022	Apple TV+	Slow Horses	James Hawes
2	6	2 December 2022	30 December 2022	Apple TV+	Dead Lions	Jeremy Lovering
3	6	29 November 2023	27 December 2023	Apple TV+	Real Tigers	Saul Metzstein
4	6	4 September 2024	9 October 2024	Apple TV+	Spook Street	Adam Randall
5	6	24 September 2025	29 October 2025	Apple TV	London Rules	Saul Metzstein
6	6	16 September 2026	21 October 2026	Apple TV	Joe Country and Slough House	Adam Randall

=== Series 1 (2022) ===
Slow Horses is based on the novel of the same name by Mick Herron, which is part of the author's Slough House series. It tells the story of a team of British intelligence agents who have all committed career-ending mistakes, and subsequently work in a dumping ground department of MI5 called Slough House.

No. overall	No. in series	Title	Directed by	Written by	Original release date
1	1	"Failure's Contagious"	James Hawes	Will Smith	1 April 2022
After being scapegoated for a colleague's mistake during a training exercise at Stansted Airport, MI5 agent River Cartwright is demoted to Slough House, a unit for disgraced operatives run by the abrasive Jackson Lamb. Lamb assigns River to surveil journalist Robert Hobden, who is linked to far-right politicians Peter Judd and Roger Simmonds. River learns that colleague Sidonie "Sid" Baker is secretly copying Hobden's USB flash drive, which he is then tasked with delivering to MI5 headquarters at Regent's Park. Hobden calls fellow journalists claiming knowledge of an imminent attack. River's grandfather David reveals that Hobden was blacklisted after appearing on a leaked donor list for the far-right British Patriotic Party and blamed MI5 for his downfall, warning River that Slough House's involvement suggests risk and the need for deniability. Lamb's assistant Catherine Standish attends an Alcoholics Anonymous meeting. The far-right Sons of Albion kidnap British-Pakistani student Hassan Ahmed, threatening to behead him on a livestream at sunrise. River defies orders to pursue the case further.
2	2	"Work Drinks"	James Hawes	Will Smith	1 April 2022
Hassan's kidnappers — "Moe", "Larry", "Curly", and "Zeppo" — hold him hostage in a London terrace basement, with Roger Simmonds revealed as the Sons of Albion's overseer. River, having copied Hobden's USB before delivering it to Regent's Park, realises it contains nothing and tricks rival James "Spider" Webb into confirming this. Standish suffers flashbacks to the death of her and Lamb's former colleague, Charles Partner. Slough House tech expert Roddy Ho fails to hack Hobden's laptop as it is air gapped, raising further suspicion. MI5 Deputy-Director General Diana Taverner recruits Slough House member Jed Moody for "off book" work. Slough House agents Min Harper and Louisa Guy commiserate in a pub about their failed careers. River and Sid tail Hobden, but Sid admits she was planted on Lamb's team to watch River. They witness a masked intruder enter Hobden's home and chase him, finding Hobden destroying his hard drive with thermite. As River and Sid fight the intruder, Hobden escapes and the attacker flees after shooting Sid in the head.
3	3	"Bad Tradecraft"	James Hawes	Will Smith	8 April 2022
Sid, critically injured, is taken to the hospital by MI5 security while River is detained; Lamb frees him, deducing Jed Moody was the gunman sent after Hobden. Moody later attacks Min and Louisa at Slough House but dies in a fall during the struggle. Lamb suspects Regent's Park will blame and disown Slough House if its operation fails. Taverner reveals to Lamb that Hassan is the nephew of the deputy head of Pakistani Military Intelligence, and that his abduction is an unsanctioned false-flag operation she engineered to boost cooperation with Pakistan and weaken the British far-right. She says that she put an agent undercover with the Sons of Albion to arrange both the kidnapping and a planned rescue. She notes that Hobden was nearby when she conceived the scheme and may have overheard or recorded her, which is why she tasked Slough House with investigating him. Standish's past ties to Charles Partner are revealed to have nearly led to a treason charge. Hobden attempts to persuade Peter Judd to expose the fake plot to kidnap Hassan, but is rebuffed. Curly makes secret calls on a burner phone. Hassan unsuccessfully attempts to escape. Taverner allows Lamb's team to signal to her mole that a raid will commence on the apartment where Hassan is being held, but when River, Min, and Louisa storm the site, they find it empty except for Moe's decapitated body.
4	4	"Visiting Hours"	James Hawes	Morwenna Banks	15 April 2022
It is revealed that Moe (real name Alan Black) was Taverner's mole, but was exposed and killed by Curly, who flees with Zeppo, Larry, and Hassan. On the road, Zeppo and Larry admit they never intended to kill Hassan and consider releasing him, alarmed by Curly's instability. Lamb and his team escape the property before MI5's security personnel, aka "the Dogs", arrive, knowing Slough House will be blamed. River rescues Roddy from being taken into custody, while Min and Louisa fail to prevent their colleague Struan Loy's detainment. Taverner repeatedly calls Standish, claiming Lamb was tied to Charles Partner's death, but Standish stays loyal until Lamb extracts her. They are seized by Webb and the Dogs' leader Nick Duffy, but Standish frees them en route to Regent's Park by pulling out Moody's Glock 17, which Lamb had hidden in her bag. The Director-General of MI5, Ingrid Tearney, cancels a State Department meeting in the US and returns to London, pressuring Taverner to cover her tracks. To deflect blame, Taverner coerces Struan into falsely testifying that Lamb orchestrated the failed false-flag plot with Black.
5	5	"Fiasco"	James Hawes	Mark Denton & Jonny Stockwood	22 April 2022
When the team regroups, River recalls photographing Taverner secretly meeting with Black during a surveillance training exercise. Lamb returns Duffy's car to Regent's Park and confronts Taverner, who offers him a quiet dismissal and threatens Standish, also claiming Sid has died. Lamb tells her there is a bomb in the car, forcing Duffy's security to investigate and giving River the chance to sneak inside the building. River confronts Webb and accuses him of helping Taverner sabotage him: during the Stansted training exercise, Webb deliberately fed River false intel at her instruction, ensuring he would fail and be demoted to Slough House, thereby preventing her scheme with Black from being uncovered. River retrieves the incriminating photo of Taverner with Black and, with Lamb, threatens to expose her operation to Tearney and the press. Standish and Roddy trace the Sons of Albion's van to an identity once used by Black. Running out of petrol, Curly declares he will behead Hassan and attempt suicide by cop, but Zeppo briefly takes control of the car by threatening Curly with a hidden handgun he took from Black's corpse. Hassan tells the group his uncle can offer them money for his safe return. After refuelling, Curly is able to disarm and kill Zeppo, regaining control.
6	6	"Follies"	James Hawes	Will Smith	29 April 2022
Taverner confronts Judd, telling him his calls to far-right allies after Hobden's visit resulted in Black's death and compromised the mission. Tearney returns from the US and orders all loose ends tied off; Taverner further lies to her about the operation. Curly drives Larry and Hassan to a forest to stage the beheading. Larry frees Hassan and attacks Curly with an axe but flees, enabling a wounded Curly to recapture Hassan. Larry reaches the port of Harwich but is shot dead by the Dogs on Tearney's orders; Duffy plants a weapon on Larry's corpse to frame him. Curly prepares to kill Hassan at what he thinks is a Norman castle, which Hassan identifies as a folly. Lamb, River, Min, and Louisa, guided by Roddy, track them there. After a shootout with River, Curly is knocked unconscious by Hassan with a rock. The Dogs arrive, but the team prevents them from executing Curly, openly defying First and Second Desk. In the aftermath, Roddy tells River Sid's records have been erased, suggesting she may still be alive. Duffy kills Hobden. It is revealed that Charles Partner was the former Director General of MI5, whose death was reported a suicide after foreign blackmail; Lamb tells Standish he gave Partner the gun he used to kill himself, but a flashback reveals that Lamb himself killed Partner on David Cartwright's orders.

=== Series 2 (2022) ===
No. overall	No. in series	Title	Directed by	Written by	Original release date
7	1	"Last Stop"	Jeremy Lovering	Will Smith	2 December 2022
Former field agent Richard "Dickie" Bough follows a man who tortured him during the Cold War, but dies on a rail replacement bus from an apparent heart attack. Lamb finds Bough's hidden phone containing the message "Cicada" and orders Slough House to investigate. River's grandfather David explains that "Cicada" referred to an alleged Russian sleeper programme dismissed as a hoax after no agents were found and its supposed mastermind, Alexander Popov, was deemed fictitious. Bough had previously claimed Popov kidnapped and force-fed him brandy in East Berlin, but was fired after his story was dismissed. David warns River against pursuing the theory. Meanwhile, Min and Louisa are seconded to Webb to provide security for a secret meeting at the Glasshouse (a commercial high-rise) with Arkady Pashkin, representative of oligarch-defector Ilya Nevsky. Roddy and newcomer Shirley Dander analyse CCTV footage and discover Bough was secretly poisoned by the man he followed, who then travelled to Stroud in the Cotswolds. River tells Lamb he knows about the Cicada conspiracy and travels to Stroud to investigate.
8	2	"From Upshott with Love"	Jeremy Lovering	Morwenna Banks	2 December 2022
Lamb meets former KGB agent and defector Nikolai Katinsky, who claims that in East Berlin he overheard Alexander Popov insisting the Cicada programme continue after the Soviet Union's collapse. Katinsky's description of Popov's associate Andrei Chernitsky matches Bough's killer. In Stroud, River bribes a taxi driver who admits taking Chernitsky to an airfield in Upshott and being instructed to lie and report any inquiries; Roddy traces the contact number to Estonia. Lamb obtains Taverner's approval for a false identity and sends River to investigate the airfield and its owner, Duncan Tropper. Taverner faces pressure from Home Secretary Judd over an upcoming anti-capitalist protest. Webb reveals his plan to meet Pashkin, which Taverner reluctantly authorises despite an agreement with Moscow to keep British agents away from Kremlin critic Nevsky. Min and Louisa meet Pashkin's security men, Piotr and Kyril, who lie about their accommodations. Min secretly follows them to a commercial address on Edgware Road but is caught when Piotr confronts him at gunpoint.
9	3	"Drinking Games"	Jeremy Lovering	Morwenna Banks	9 December 2022
Piotr's threat to Min appears to be a joke, and Min drinks vodka with Piotr and Kyril until a friend arrives. Min is later killed in an apparent drunk cycling accident, but Lamb suspects foul play. Investigating the supposed driver, Rebecca, he discovers she once lived in Vladivostok; she admits she was paid to take responsibility and did not hit Min. Judd insists that Taverner accompany him as security for his speech. Marcus Longridge replaces Min on the Pashkin assignment and tells Louisa that his gambling addiction caused his exile to Slough House. Roddy, Shirley, and Standish discover that Chernitsky remained in the UK after planting his phone in the luggage of an Estonia-bound folk band to create a false trail. Posing as a Times journalist, River befriends Kelly, daughter of suspected sleeper agent Duncan Tropper, and learns that her parents were former student radicals who moved to the village. Invited to dinner, River meets their visiting friend Leo, who is actually Chernitsky.
10	4	"Cicada"	Jeremy Lovering	Mark Denton & Jonny Stockwood	16 December 2022
Rebecca tells Lamb that Piotr and Kyril attacked and ran over Min before Chernitsky killed him and staged his death as an accident. Lamb discovers that Katinsky has been acting as a triple agent, secretly assisting Russia in exchange for protection from consequences over his earlier defection. Standish meets Victor Krymov, who arranged Webb's meeting with Pashkin, leading Lamb to conclude that Krymov falsely presented Pashkin as Nevsky's envoy when he is likely a rival. Lamb and Shirley find Nevsky dead from an apparent suicide after being poisoned with a radioactive injection. Seeking revenge for Min, Louisa prepares to torture Pashkin, but Marcus intervenes and Lamb orders her to continue the planned meeting instead. Meanwhile, River follows Chernitsky from the Tropper residence to an airfield, where he finds him and Katinsky preparing an improvised explosive device. Duncan's wife Alex arrives and incapacitates River with a stun gun, revealing herself as the sleeper agent.
11	5	"Boardroom Politics"	Jeremy Lovering	Mark Denton & Jonny Stockwood	23 December 2022
Katinsky tells River that Alex plans to fly a plane into the Glasshouse in a suicide attack. Duncan and Kelly free River, who convinces them of Alex's true identity. River calls in a "Code September", prompting Taverner to evacuate Judd from the Royal Exchange and clear the Glasshouse area. Lamb blackmails Duffy for access to MI5 records and deduces that Katinsky is the spymaster behind the Cicada programme, having posed as a minor defector while secretly handling an MI5 traitor. After Standish defeats Krymov at chess, he reveals that Katinsky arranged Webb's meeting with Pashkin and specifically requested Slough House's involvement. At the Glasshouse, an evacuation alarm interrupts Webb's meeting with Pashkin. Louisa warns Webb that Pashkin is likely FSB and responsible for Nevsky's murder. Pashkin shoots Webb, escapes with Piotr, and traps the others inside, but Marcus shoots Kyril with a concealed pistol. Meanwhile, Roddy and Shirley track Chernitsky to a central London train station as mass evacuations begin.
12	6	"Old Scores"	Jeremy Lovering	Will Smith	30 December 2022
Louisa learns from a dying Kyril that Pashkin's team used the Glasshouse evacuation to drain Nevsky's accounts. River discovers the airfield bomb was a decoy and retracts the Code September alert. Roddy traces Chernitsky to Tunbridge Wells, where River's grandfather David lives; River has Kelly fly him there. Chernitsky attacks Roddy on the train but escapes after Shirley intervenes. Louisa confronts Pashkin, who is killed by Marcus. Lamb confronts Katinsky as being the spymaster "Alexander Popov", with the late Charles Partner having been his MI5 mole. Lamb had inadvertently exposed his Stasi source's gender to Partner, causing three women to be executed. David subsequently used Partner to feed Moscow false intelligence before ordering Lamb to kill him. Katinsky admits orchestrating the bomb scare to humiliate Lamb's team in revenge for Partner's death and reveals David as Chernitsky's target. Forewarned by Lamb, David kills Chernitsky before River arrives. Katinsky accepts defeat and kills himself with a bullet left by Lamb. Taverner and Judd cover up the Code September as a security glitch, while Alex is allowed to return home. Denied a memorial for Min, the Slow Horses secretly install a plaque at St Leonard's Church, where Lamb also commemorates Dickie.

=== Series 3 (2023) ===
No. overall	No. in series	Title	Directed by	Written by	Original release date
13	1	"Strange Games"	Saul Metzstein	Will Smith	29 November 2023
British intelligence officers and lovers Sean Donovan and Alison Dunn are stationed in Istanbul. Suspecting Dunn has stolen a classified embassy file, Donovan follows her through the city but loses her. Dunn exchanges the file, labelled "Footprint", with an unknown man before being murdered, and Donovan finds her body. A year later, Donovan approaches Standish after an AA meeting, using the alias "John" and posing as a fellow member. They talk at a cafe until he mentions Lamb, alarming Standish. When she attempts to leave, Donovan's team abducts her. Her absence concerns Slough House the next day, and Shirley and Marcus search her flat, confirming she never returned home. Louisa retraces Standish's movements to the cafe, where she discovers the security cameras disabled and Standish's hair grip in an underpass. Meanwhile, River receives a photograph of Standish held at gunpoint with instructions to reach Barbican Bridge within one minute or she will be killed.
14	2	"Hard Lessons"	Saul Metzstein	Will Smith	29 November 2023
River rushes to Barbican Bridge and finds Webb, who claims to have been coerced by kidnappers who have endangered his family. Webb tells River to steal the Prime Minister's MI5 vetting file within an hour or Standish will be killed. River doubts the threat until a sniper's laser targets Webb. To gain entry to the Park, River claims to have found a missing diamond from the Glasshouse affair, then evades Duffy and his men while stealing a pass from another Dog, Hobbs, to reach the records office. There, records overseer Molly Doran refuses to help him locate the file. Louisa's investigation of the cafe links an abandoned car to Donovan. Lamb notices Slough House is under surveillance; Shirley and Marcus pursue one of the watchers but lose him. Lamb meets ex-colleague Sam Chapman, who tells him Donovan now works for private security firm Chieftain. Lamb calls River claiming that Standish is safe, insisting the kidnappers are a "tiger team" testing MI5 security, and orders him to leave the Park. River sneaks out but is captured by Duffy's men.
15	3	"Negotiating with Tigers"	Saul Metzstein	Will Smith	6 December 2023
Duffy brutally beats River for embarrassing the Dogs. Lamb discovers that Standish's kidnappers work for Chieftain, a private security firm hired by Home Secretary Peter Judd as a "tiger team" to expose MI5 vulnerabilities. Judd uses the operation's success to pressure Tearney into privatising MI5 security, benefiting Chieftain, which is run by his old school friend Sly Monteith. Donovan goes rogue, kidnapping Chieftain operative Sturges and moving him and Standish elsewhere. Shirley and Marcus illegally search Donovan's flat and discover "stage two" involves accessing the Grey Books, MI5's records of conspiracy theories, but are arrested and subsequently fired by Lamb for incompetence. Lamb secures River's release and sends him with Louisa to investigate Chieftain, where they discover Webb was working for them the whole time. Monteith sends Webb to pay Donovan and retrieve Standish, but Donovan accidentally kills Webb during an altercation. Lamb interrupts Judd and Monteith's dinner to negotiate Standish's release, only for Donovan to dump Webb's body outside.
16	4	"Uninvited Guests"	Saul Metzstein	Mark Denton & Jonny Stockwood	13 December 2023
Tearney reasserts control over MI5, planning to let Donovan access the Grey Books in exchange for Standish's release, then have Duffy arrest him. At the safehouse, Donovan reveals to Standish that he is working with Alison Dunn's siblings, Ben and Sarah, to expose those responsible for her death. Standish sympathises and tells them where to find the file they want. Sturges manages to escape. River comforts his grandfather, whose memory is failing. Roddy tracks the safehouse's location and sets out with Lamb to rescue Standish. River and Louisa accompany Donovan and Ben into an MI5 file-storage facility, where Ben reveals that the Grey Books are merely a decoy, and that they seek a different hidden file. Tearney, after consulting Molly, realises a Park insider must have concealed this file inside the facility for Donovan. She orders Duffy to lead a Chieftain strike team, with instructions to kill everyone inside to prevent the file's exposure.
17	5	"Cleaning Up"	Saul Metzstein	Mark Denton & Jonny Stockwood	20 December 2023
Tearney confronts Taverner, revealed as Donovan's source, who planted the "Footprint" file in the facility. It details a failed MI5 trial of a wireless hacking device Tearney approved years earlier; the malfunction nearly killed several people, and the subsequent cover-up left Footprint as the only record. Alison discovered the truth and planned to leak it before Tearney had her killed and her death staged as a suicide. Chieftain operatives prepare an assault on the facility. River warns Lamb and calls Slough House for backup before lines are cut. Hoping to win back their jobs, Shirley and Marcus arm themselves and drive to help. Duffy leads Chieftain into the facility, capturing security guard Douglas, who is executed for knowing too much about the operation. At the Dunn house, Lamb retrieves Standish from Sarah, but Sturges and Hobbs arrive under orders to kill everyone. At the file facility, River, Louisa, Donovan, and Ben resist Chieftain's attack, locate the Footprint file, and fight to hold them off. During the battle Ben is killed, leaving Donovan and the others to defend themselves.
18	6	"Footprints"	Saul Metzstein	Will Smith	27 December 2023
Hobbs and Sturges storm the Dunn house, but are outsmarted by Lamb, who rigged the house with booby traps. Sarah strangles Sturges to death during a struggle while Lamb kills Hobbs; Roddy crashes a bus through the house in an attempt to mount a heroic rescue, but arrives too late to help. At the file facility, Donovan sacrifices himself so River and Louisa can escape with the Footprint file. Shirley intervenes to save them from the Dogs' ambush, while Marcus defeats Duffy in a fistfight; Louisa finishes Duffy off with a rock to the head. Afterwards, Lamb reveals to Standish that her idol Charles Partner was a traitor who had been laying a trail to frame her as the one leaking secrets to the Russians, trusting her alcoholism would prevent her from noticing it. Shattered, she resigns from Slough House. River brings the Footprint file to his grandfather, who burns it to protect MI5's reputation, but River had already made a copy and leaks it. The exposure forces both Tearney and Judd to resign.

=== Series 4 (2024) ===
No. overall	No. in series	Title	Directed by	Written by	Original release date
19	1	"Identity Theft"	Adam Randall	Will Smith	4 September 2024
A suicide bomb explodes at London's Westacres shopping mall. A video shows perpetrator Robert Winters confessing to the attack, while three police officers are subsequently killed by a booby trap at his flat. New First Desk Claude Whelan relies on Taverner's experience as the investigation begins. River tells Louisa that he believes his grandfather David has Alzheimer's and is becoming paranoid, and she encourages him to care for David. At Slough House, Marcus struggles with his gambling addiction, Roddy claims to have a girlfriend, Standish has been replaced by exiled MI5 secretary Moira Tregorian, and PTSD-suffering JK Coe has joined the team. At David's house, a man arrives claiming to be River, prompting David to shoot him before fleeing. Emma Flyte, the Dogs' new commander, asks Lamb to identify the body. Lamb identifies it as River despite realising it is someone else. He later confronts Standish and discovers that River has arranged for David to hide at her flat. River is revealed to be travelling through France in a taxi.
20	2	"A Stranger Comes to Town"	Adam Randall	Will Smith	11 September 2024
Having learned that the man David shot was an assassin named Bertrand, River hides David at Standish's flat, assumes Bertrand's identity and travels to the French town of Lavande to investigate. Lamb reveals to the team that River is alive, and unsuccessfully questions a mentally deteriorating David as to why he might have enemies in France. MI5 analyst Giti Rahman discovers that Robert Winters is a "cold body", a fake identity created by MI5. Taverner destroys the evidence and blackmails Whelan into going along with the cover-up. River follows clues to a secluded estate, Les Arbres, and is nearly killed by a mysterious man. River is saved by another man, who knocks him out with the butt of his shotgun and takes him captive.
21	3	"Penny for Your Thoughts"	Adam Randall	Morwenna Banks	18 September 2024
River is held captive by Bertrand's mother Natasha, whose cousin rescued River from Les Arbres. Natasha reveals that the man who attacked River is Bertrand's father, Frank Harkness, who raised several other sons by different mothers at Les Arbres. River shows her a photo he retrieved from Les Arbres of Harkness with Bertrand, Robert Winters, and a third son; Natasha says Winters' real name is Yves. A mob arrives seeking to kill River, thinking he is Bertrand, but he manages to escape. Flyte interrogates Lamb, who gives up David's location. Standish successfully conceals David from Flyte, but a confused David then runs off. Whelan recruits Giti to investigate MI5's cold bodies behind Taverner's back. Lamb learns from Moira that David's bagman, Sam Chapman, had spent time in Lavande 30 years ago, just as Harkness sends Patrice, an assassin and one of his sons, to kill Chapman. Lamb manages to rescue Chapman, with help from Marcus and Shirley, but Patrice escapes.
22	4	"Returns"	Adam Randall	Mark Denton & Jonny Stockwood	25 September 2024
Chapman tells Lamb how he was sent by David to Les Arbres 30 years earlier to give the mercenary group that operated there a cache of guns, money and "cold body" identities in exchange for a woman. Harkness' employers threaten to have him killed unless he helps them cover up their involvement in Westacres by taking out Chapman and David, revealing that Westacres was meant to be a quiet assassination and not a bombing. Lamb deduces that David has gone to the old MI5 HQ, now a luxury hotel, and manages to extricate him before the Dogs arrive. Attempting to flee the country, Chapman is caught by Patrice and killed after refusing to disclose David's whereabouts. Whelan discovers that River has travelled to France using Bertrand's cold body identity. As River returns to London, he is chased by the Dogs and escapes to David's house, where he compares his photo of a mural he saw at Les Arbres with hand-painted postcards his mother sent him as a child, finding them to be identical in style. The Dogs arrive moments later, and Flyte catches River.
23	5	"Grave Danger"	Adam Randall	Mark Denton & Jonny Stockwood & Will Smith	2 October 2024
David tells Lamb and Standish that he secretly extracted his daughter—River's mother—from Les Arbres in exchange for money, weapons, and fake identities that Harkness used to create a "deniable assassination squad" trained from birth. Lamb investigates Chapman's disappearance while Standish takes David to Slough House. Moira learns that Whelan exiled her there after she inadvertently discovered evidence of his visits to prostitutes, while Coe tells Ho that his "girlfriend" Kim is a bot. River convinces Flyte to send his photograph of Harkness' group to the Park, where Giti identifies Harkness as a former Special Forces and CIA operative discharged for crimes including embezzlement and torture. Whelan and Taverner connect the cold-body identities used by Harkness' sons to assassinations worldwide and plan a cover-up. Harkness forces Molly to surrender her security credentials, allowing him to track River's convoy. Patrice intercepts it, kills four Dogs, knocks Flyte unconscious, and kidnaps River.
24	6	"Hello Goodbye"	Adam Randall	Will Smith	9 October 2024
River is taken to meet Harkness, who confirms that he is his biological father and offers to train him to be part of his organisation, but River refuses and deduces that Yves bombed Westacres in revenge for Harkness' abuse. The Dogs, Louisa, and Flyte converge on River's location. Harkness places a live grenade in River's sweatshirt, but Louisa throws it into the water before it explodes. Harkness escapes in the chaos, but River pursues him to a train station, where Harkness allows himself to be arrested. Lamb finds Chapman's body, while Patrice uses Chapman's phone to learn that David is at Slough House. Patrice attacks Slough House and kills Marcus before Shirley and Lamb subdue him. Coe persuades Shirley not to execute Patrice, then kills him himself. Harkness secures his release by threatening to expose MI5 and other security agencies for employing his mercenary group for assassinations, having arranged for incriminating letters to be released to Whelan and other heads of service if he remains detained. River reluctantly places David in a care home, after which Lamb invites him for a drink.

=== Series 5 (2025) ===
No. overall	No. in series	Title	Directed by	Written by	Original release date
25	1	"Bad Dates"	Saul Metzstein	Will Smith	24 September 2025
A man armed with a military assault rifle kills eleven civilians in Abbotsfield before an unseen sniper kills him. One victim is a campaigner for London mayor Zafar Jaffrey, who is seeking re-election against right-wing populist Dennis Gimball. Flyte identifies the gunman as Rob Trew, a Gimball supporter radicalised on incel forums and apparently recruited by his killer. Shirley saves Roddy from being run over and suspects an assassination attempt, though the rest of Slough House attributes her fears to guilt and PTSD over Marcus' death. Louisa begins a six-month mental health break but privately tells River she intends to leave the Service. Shirley follows Roddy to a date with his new girlfriend, Tara, and tails them to a nightclub, while Standish asks River to intervene. Shirley mistakenly attacks another patron and argues with River, but resumes following Roddy and Tara when they leave by cab. After Tara drops Roddy at his flat, she secretly sends his location to an unknown contact.
26	2	"Incommunicado"	Saul Metzstein	Will Smith	1 October 2025
Lamb warns Roddy that he is in danger and stations Shirley outside his flat. An assassin breaks in, but Lamb blinds him with bleach and Roddy knocks him out a window as accomplices fire at them from a van. Shirley stabs the fleeing assassin, but he escapes before his team kills and burns him, with their leader Farouk revealing the attack was staged to make MI5 believe Roddy was a target. Lamb takes Roddy to a rooftop restaurant and records what he knows about Tara. River and Coe visit Tara's given address, unaware she is watching nearby. Judd tells Taverner that he advises an arms company that lost weapons, including one used in the Abbotsfield massacre. A paparazzo working for Gimball's wife Dodie, a gossip columnist, confronts Whelan about his history with prostitutes. Flyte reports that shell casings from Roddy's flat match those used to kill Trew. Coe infers that the attacks follow a destabilisation strategy based on UK invasion tactics. Taverner orders the Dogs to seize Roddy and lock down Slough House, while the terrorists recruit eco-activists to sabotage a petrol refinery, causing car fires across London.
27	3	"Tall Tales"	Saul Metzstein	Sean Gray	8 October 2025
The Dogs keep Slough House under lockdown amid chaos caused by the car fires. Whelan consults an MI5 lawyer about placing a D-Notice on reports of his personal affairs. The terrorists trick a drug addict into bombing the penguin enclosure at London Zoo, creating a media distraction that draws Flyte and several Dogs away. Coe identifies Roddy's compromise, the Abbotsfield attack, transport disruption, and media distraction as stages of a national destabilisation strategy, with the assassination of a populist leader likely next, convincing Lamb that Gimball is a target. At a campaign event, Jaffrey is confronted by his disillusioned son Irfan, who is arrested after admitting to the refinery sabotage. Lamb distracts the remaining Dogs with a story about an agent and his pregnant lover being tortured by the Stasi, allowing River, Shirley, and Coe to overpower them. Lamb sends his agents to protect Jaffrey and Gimball, while denying Standish's suspicion that the story was actually about him. Taverner interrogates Roddy and learns that Tara briefly accessed the MI5 database, raising fears of a major security breach.
28	4	"Missiles"	Saul Metzstein	Edward Docx	15 October 2025
Flyte tricks Roddy into revealing Tara's location, but Lamb reaches her flat first, deduces she is hiding at Roddy's flat, and catches her before Flyte arrests her. Whelan threatens to expose Dennis Gimball as the son of a Turkish illegal immigrant and Dodie Gimball as a former Marxist to suppress publication of his affair, but Dennis secretly records the blackmail attempt. Jaffrey learns that the sabotaged petrol killed a woman, raising concerns about Irfan's connection to the terrorists. Shirley and Standish thwart Farouk's attempt to assassinate Jaffrey, but he escapes. At Gimball's rally, Coe witnesses Jaffrey's chief of staff, Tyson Bowman, ask Gimball not to mention Irfan. Gimball refuses and racially provokes Bowman, prompting a scuffle that River stops by drawing a gun. As Coe descends overhead scaffolding, various equipment collisions cause a paint can to drop onto Gimball's head, killing him. River and Coe discover that Dennis's tape recorded the entire confrontation and steal it.
29	5	"Circus"	Saul Metzstein	Will Smith	22 October 2025
River and Coe privately admit to Lamb that they accidentally killed Gimball. Lamb tells Taverner and Whelan that the terrorists are likely Libyan, seeking revenge for Britain’s role in the collapse of their government after Muammar Gaddafi's fall, and warns they intend to "blind the enemy". Taverner confirms Tara is Libyan. Tara claims she was coerced into honey trapping Roddy and gives MI5 a code she entered while using his account. The Dogs trace the terrorists' van to an airport and suspect an attack on a passenger flight. Tara arranges a midnight meeting at Piccadilly Circus, where Whelan sends her wearing a tracker while Flyte and the Dogs surveil her. Shirley and Standish discover Tara is connected to every stage of the destabilisation plot. David warns River that another honey trap may be next, but River dismisses him. The code proves to be a virus that disables Regent's Park. Tara escapes surveillance, abandons her tracker in the Underground, rejoins the terrorists, and announces the final phase of their plan.
30	6	"Scars"	Saul Metzstein	Will Smith	29 October 2025
Tara seizes the Libyan embassy and demands £100 million in lost oil revenues and safe passage, threatening to attack a place of worship. With MI5's systems down, Taverner pays the ransom into Judd's offshore account, which he secretly rented to the Libyans. Farouk and Kamal proceed with the attack, while Sami deserts them over killing civilians. Standish and Lamb help the Dogs capture Tara. Coe and Lamb identify Jaffrey's Abbotsfield memorial service at a multi-faith centre as the target. River, Coe, and Shirley evacuate the crowd before Farouk and Kamal attack; Shirley kills Kamal while Coe fatally stabs Farouk. David inadvertently makes River realise one terrorist remains, and Lamb advises him to protect Whelan. Sami ambushes Whelan during his morning jog and confronts him over his past policy advice's role in Libya's collapse, but River arrives and kills Sami. Whelan plans to close Slough House and blame its agents while Judd profits from the ransom, but Lamb uses Gimball's tape to force Whelan to resign and keep Slough House open. Taverner replaces Whelan, frees Roddy, and denies River's promotion. Lamb's foot is revealed to be severely scarred, confirming he was the torture victim from his story.

=== Series 6 (2026) ===
No. overall	No. in series	Title	Directed by	Written by	Original release date
31	1	"Circle of Life"	Adam Randall	Gaby Chiappe	16 September 2026
Former Slow Horse Struan Loy is murdered by a couple posing as investors, who break his arm, lock him inside his shipping-container home, and set it on fire. The same pair later kill former Slow Horse Kay White and target River. Flyte alerts Lamb despite Taverner's orders, and Lamb and River determine Struan's death was deliberate. Meanwhile, River grieves his grandfather David's recent death, while Slough House and its employees have been erased from the Service database and payroll. Standish learns from Moira that the deletion was ordered from the top. Taverner, now First Desk, is forced to accommodate Judd and wealthy investors. At David's funeral, Taverner learns that Judd's investment actually came from an anonymous third party. Lamb learns of White's death from Roddy. Taverner appears unaware of Slough House's deletion from the database when Lamb confronts her, and blurts out in front of Standish that Lamb killed Charles Partner. River spots his father, Frank Harkness, watching the funeral from a distance, and confronts him. Harkness claims he is there on business, before incapacitating River and escaping.
32	2	"Daddy Issues"	Adam Randall	Edward Docx	23 September 2026
Harkness murders former Dog Andrew Nesmith after using him to steal files from Molly's archives containing the identities of everyone who has worked at Slough House, but Nesmith's son Reece escapes. Lamb and River investigate Nesmith's staged suicide and discover that Reece had been present; Roddy traces him to a foster home. Shirley and Coe investigate Kay White's death and learn that a man and woman were seen leaving her boat. The same couple, Jim and Jane, poison former Slow Horse Moira Tregorian and purchase a nail gun. Judd reveals to Taverner that right-wing media mogul Damien Cantor secretly funded his investment in MI5 and uses it to pressure Taverner into a televised interview on Cantor's channel, where she is questioned about the UK's response to a recent Novichok attack and Charles Partner's links to foreign intelligence. Cantor is also revealed to have hired Harkness to steal the Slough House files. Learning of the theft, Lamb orders the Slow Horses to go dark and assemble at Blake's Grave. River ignores the order and goes instead to his grandfather's house, where Roddy had traced several mysterious calls to River's phone. River arrives expecting Harkness but instead finds Sid Baker, who had been presumed dead.
33	3	"Resurrection"	Adam Randall	Sophie Goodhart	30 September 2026
Jim and Jane arrive at David's house; River and Sid narrowly escape from them and take shelter in the house of Anne, an elderly lady. On the internet, they find articles about an assassination in Kazan, Russia, with the assassin supposedly using Sid's credentials. After Jim and Jane (themselves revealed to be Russian) catch up with them, River destroys their car and uses the distraction to escape with Sid; Coe later picks them up. Standish and Shirley retrieve Louisa, interrupting her presentation at work. The trio find Moira, still alive, and rescue her from her home. Lamb and Roddy retrieve Reece from the orphanage and probe him about witnessing his father's murder. After Flyte prods Taverner about the impromptu interview, Taverner lambasts her for informing to Lamb and questioning her, dismissing her as head of security. Lamb meets Taverner at her home and informs her of Andrew Nesmith's death, surmising that Harkness is performing cleanup on behalf of an unknown party. Sid asks Coe to stop at a phone booth so she can report to Taverner. As Sid and River head out to find a working phone, Jim and Jane catch up with them.
34	4	"Lost and Found"	Adam Randall	Mark Denton & Jonny Stockwood	7 October 2026
River and Sid escape Jim and Jane with Coe's help. Cantor pressures Taverner into accepting a call from Russian First Desk Vassily Rasnakov, while Oliver Nash, head of the Limitations Committee, confronts her about using secret funds to assassinate the GRU agent in Kazan involved in the Novichok attack. Rasnakov demands Sid in exchange for ending the killings of other Slough House agents, and Taverner tentatively agrees. Lamb uses Reece to lure Harkness to a meeting, where he realises that Harkness is not responsible for the killings. Harkness's men catch Reece spying, but Lamb creates a disturbance to escape with him. Flyte helps Lamb tail Harkness and sees him meet Cantor. Standish, Louisa, Moira, and Shirley go to a safehouse, which they discover to be Taverner's summer home. At a service station, River and Sid argue over trusting Taverner. Jim and Jane arrive; Coe dies in a knife fight with Jim in the bathroom, and River discovers his body. Jane abducts Sid while she tries to contact Taverner, who has the call traced but orders it ignored. River arrives too late and watches Jim and Jane drive away with Sid.
35	5	"Sayonara"	Adam Randall	Sophie Goodhart	14 October 2026
Sid escapes from Jim and Jane's car by striking Jane with a metal souvenir, causing a crash. Jim pursues Sid into the woods and attempts to drown her, but River intervenes, allowing Sid to strike Jim with a rock before they drown him. The Dogs apprehend River and Sid and take them to a private airfield, unaware that Jane's body has disappeared from the wreckage. Lamb confronts Taverner about the Kazan operation, deducing that Cantor's investment financed the assassination and that he subsequently hired Harkness to eliminate those involved. The remaining Slow Horses hide at Taverner's summer home, where Shirley prepares Molotov cocktails. Investigating Cantor's movements, Roddy and Lamb discover his connection to Natasha Carrington, a Russian intermediary arranging him a major media distribution deal. Taverner reveals she used Sid's identity for the Kazan assassination because the actual operative was too valuable to sacrifice, and intends to hand Sid over to Russian intelligence in Sofia, Bulgaria. River and Sid profess their feelings before escaping the airfield, but River returns to distract the Dogs and is recaptured, allowing Sid to flee.
36	6	"Judgment Day"	Adam Randall	Gaby Chiappe	21 October 2026
After the Dogs release River, he informs Lamb of Coe's death and heads to Taverner's safehouse. Lamb persuades Natasha to frame Cantor as a double agent and mastermind of the Kazan assassination instead of Sid. Taverner tricks Cantor into fleeing, allowing Lamb to capture him. Meanwhile, Harkness and his mercenaries attack the safehouse. Flyte saves Roddy, Reece, and Shirley and wounds Harkness before he kills her, while Reece kills another attacker with a harpoon. Lamb forces Cantor to order Harkness to stand down and summons reinforcements; Cantor is subsequently handed over to the Russians. Jane arrives at the safehouse, shoots Louisa in the abdomen, and nearly kills River before Harkness kills her. River speaks briefly with his father before allowing him to escape as the Dogs arrive. Taverner implicates Judd for treason to the Home Secretary rather than confessing her own misconduct. The Slow Horses gather at a church to commemorate Coe, joined by the recovering Louisa. River learns someone is at David's house and finds Sid there. After touching a crowbar, he develops breathing difficulties and collapses.

== Production ==
=== Development ===
The series was given a straight to series order by Apple TV+ in October 2019, with English writer and comedian Will Smith serving as showrunner. Each of the first five series has adapted the corresponding novel in the Slough House set. In October 2024, the show was renewed for a sixth series, which jointly adapts the sixth and seventh books, Joe Country and Slough House. The fifth series premiered on 24 September 2025, followed by new episodes on a weekly basis until the season finale on 29 October 2025. In July 2025, ahead of the fifth series premiere, Apple TV+ renewed for a seventh series which is to be based on Bad Actors. The sixth series premiered on 16 September 2026, with new episodes being released on a weekly basis until the finale on 21 October 2026. The day before the sixth series premiered, Apple TV renewed the show for an eighth series, based on the novel Clown Town. In November 2026, Apple TV renewed the show for a ninth and tenth series.

By 2025, the series began receiving praise for its production schedule, which allows it to release seasons yearly despite being a streaming series. The Wall Street Journal released an op-ed regarding the show's production schedule and strategy, which includes filming seasons back-to-back, and having multiple phases of production in motion at once.

In July 2025, it was announced that Smith would depart as showrunner after the fifth series, with Gaby Chiappe taking over as head writer for the sixth series, and Ben Vanstone for the seventh and eighth. Smith described his departure as a "practical decision" in the face of difficulties managing scriptwriting for two series at a time, per the show's established schedule of simultaneously shooting one series while writing and pre-producing the next.

=== Casting ===
In October 2019, along with the series order, Gary Oldman was announced to star. The cast was rounded out in December 2020 with the additions of Olivia Cooke, Jonathan Pryce, Kristin Scott Thomas and Jack Lowden.

=== Filming ===
Since its premiere, production of Slow Horses has followed a schedule of shooting two series back to back, with the next series already having completed filming by the time the current one is released. Commentators have noted how the speed and consistency of Slow Horses' release schedule stands in contrast to the increasingly long, multi-year gaps between seasons of prestige TV shows, such as Severance and Stranger Things.

Filming of the first series began on 30 November 2020 in the UK, and continued into February 2021. In July 2021, filming continued in Stroud, Gloucestershire. It was originally intended to film earlier in 2020 but was delayed due to the COVID-19 pandemic. By March 2023, filming for the third series had been completed and filming for the fourth was about to begin. In June 2025, Oldman announced that filming for the sixth series had already been completed prior to the release of the fifth, and that filming for the seventh was expected to begin by October of that year.

Each series thus far has consisted of six episodes helmed by a single director: James Hawes directed the first series, Jeremy Lovering directed the second, Saul Metzstein directed the third and fifth, Adam Randall directed the fourth, sixth, and eighth, and Robert McKillop directed the seventh.

The sixth series received a preview screening in the Primetime programme at the 2026 Toronto International Film Festival prior to its Apple TV release.

== Reception ==
=== Critical response ===
Critical response of Slow Horses
Series	Rotten Tomatoes	Metacritic
1	95% (60 reviews)	78 (22 reviews)
2	100% (25 reviews)	84 (10 reviews)
3	98% (43 reviews)	85 (21 reviews)
4	100% (44 reviews)	85 (19 reviews)
5	96% (43 reviews)	79 (17 reviews)
6	98% (41 reviews)	85 (12 reviews)

All six series of Slow Horses have received critical acclaim.

For the first series, Rotten Tomatoes lists a 95% approval rating based on 60 reviews with an average rating of 7.5/10. The website's critical consensus reads, "Slow Horses refreshes the espionage genre by letting its band of snoops be bumbling, with Gary Oldman giving a masterclass in frumpy authority." On Metacritic, the first series has a weighted average score of 78 out of 100 based on 22 critics.

The second series received a 100% approval rating on Rotten Tomatoes based on 25 reviews with an average rating of 8.5/10. The website's critical consensus says, "Slow Horses says nay to the sophomore jinx with a second series that might be even better than its supremely addictive predecessor." On Metacritic, series two has a weighted average score of 84 out of 100 based on 10 critics. Oldman was nominated for a Golden Globe and BAFTA Award for his portrayal of Jackson Lamb.

The third series received a 98% approval rating from Rotten Tomatoes based on 43 reviews with an average rating of 8.5/10. The website's critical consensus reads, "Slow Horses' shabby charms reach a full gallop in this superb third season, yielding what might just be Slough House's most compelling operation yet." On Metacritic, series three has a weighted average score of 85 out of 100 based on 21 critics. The third series received nine Primetime Emmy Award nominations, including Lead Actor in a Drama Series for Gary Oldman, Supporting Actor in a Drama Series for Jack Lowden and Outstanding Drama Series.

The fourth series received a 100% approval rating from Rotten Tomatoes based on reviews from 44 critics with an average rating of 8.6/10. The website's critical consensus says, "The stakes get more personal than ever before in Slow Horses' superb fourth season, proving that this spy series is saddled up for the long haul with no signs of fatigue." On Metacritic, series four has a weighted average score of 85 out of 100 based on 19 critics. Oldman was nominated for his second Golden Globe, second Emmy Award, second BAFTA Award, and first Screen Actors Guild Award for his performance.

The fifth series has received a 96% approval rating from Rotten Tomatoes based on reviews from 43 critics with an average rating of 8.05/10. The website's critical consensus says, "Slow Horses loosens the reins in a more lighthearted season that doesn't quite measure up to the series' high bar, but it still excels as one of the most compulsively watchable offerings on television." On Metacritic, series five has a weighted average score of 79 out of 100 based on 17 critics. Oldman was nominated for his third Golden Globe, third Emmy Award and second Screen Actors Guild Award for his performance, whilst Lowden received a second Emmy nomination.

The sixth series has received a 98% approval rating from Rotten Tomatoes based on reviews from 41 critics with an average rating of 8.45/10. The website's critical consensus says, "Six seasons in, Slow Horses is still finding new ways to surprise, pairing its delightfully convoluted plotting with sharp writing, killer performances, and plenty of cynical bite." On Metacritic, series six has a weighted average score of 85 out of 100 based on 12 critics.

=== Accolades ===
Year	Award	Category	Nominee(s)	Result	Ref.
2022	HCA TV Awards	Best Actor in a Streaming Drama Series	Gary Oldman	Nominated	
2022	Music+Sound Awards	Best Original Composition in Film + Television Programme Titles	Mick Jagger and Daniel Pemberton	Nominated	
2022	World Soundtrack Awards	Best Original Song	Mick Jagger and Daniel Pemberton (for "Strange Game")	Nominated	
2022	Hollywood Music in Media Awards	Best Main Title Theme in a TV Show/Limited Series	Mick Jagger and Daniel Pemberton	Nominated	
2022	Hollywood Music in Media Awards	Best Original Song in a TV Show/Limited Series	Mick Jagger and Daniel Pemberton (for "Strange Game")	Nominated	
2022	RTS Craft & Design Awards	Music – Original Title	Mick Jagger and Daniel Pemberton	Nominated	
2023	Writers' Guild of Great Britain Awards	Best Long Form TV Drama	Will Smith (for "Failure's Contagious")	Nominated	
2023	British Society of Cinematographers Awards	Best Cinematography in a Television Drama	Danny Cohen (for "Bad Tradecraft")	Nominated	
2023	The Operators Awards	Television Drama	Vince McGahon (for "Bad Tradecraft")	Won	
2023	Casting Directors' Guild Awards	Best Casting in a TV Drama Series	Nina Gold and Kate Bone	Nominated	
2023	USC Scripter Awards	Episodic Series	Will Smith (for "Failure's Contagious")	Won	
2023	BPG Awards	Best Drama Series	Slow Horses	Nominated	
2023	BPG Awards	Best Actor	Gary Oldman	Nominated	
2023	RTS Programme Awards	Writer – Drama	Will Smith	Nominated	
2023	British Academy Television Craft Awards	Best Editing: Fiction	Katie Weiland (for "Failure's Contagious")	Nominated	
2023	British Academy Television Craft Awards	Best Original Music	Mick Jagger and Daniel Pemberton	Nominated	
2023	British Academy Television Craft Awards	Best Sound: Fiction	Andrew Sissons, Martin Jensen, Joe Beal, Sarah Elias, Craig Butters, and Duncan Price	Nominated	
2023	British Academy Television Awards	Best Actor	Gary Oldman	Nominated	
2023	British Academy Television Awards	Best Supporting Actor	Jack Lowden	Nominated	
2023	Edinburgh TV Awards	Best Drama	Slow Horses	Nominated	
2023	Broadcast Digital Awards	Best Drama Programme	Slow Horses	Nominated	
2023	RTS Craft & Design Awards	Sound – Scripted	Andrew Sissons, Martin Jensen, and Joe Beal	Nominated	
2024	Golden Globe Awards	Best Performance by an Actor in a Television Series – Drama	Gary Oldman	Nominated	
2024	The Operators Awards	Television Drama	Vince McGahon and James Harrison (for "Cleaning Up")	Nominated	
2024	BFE Cut Above Awards	Best Edited Series – Drama	Sam Williams and Zsófia Tálas	Nominated	
2024	Casting Directors' Guild Awards	Best Casting in a TV Drama Series	Nina Gold and Melissa Gethin Clarke	Nominated	
2024	Casting Directors' Guild Awards	Best Casting in a TV Drama Series	Nina Gold and Melissa Gethin Clarke	Nominated	
2024	USC Scripter Awards	Episodic Series	Will Smith (for "Negotiating with Tigers")	Won	
2024	ACE Eddie Awards	Best Edited Drama Series	Sam Williams (for "Strange Games")	Nominated	
2024	Satellite Awards	Best Actor in a Drama or Genre Series	Gary Oldman	Won	
2024	BPG Awards	Best Drama Series	Slow Horses	Nominated	
2024	BPG Awards	Best Actor	Gary Oldman	Won	
2024	BPG Awards	Best Writer	Will Smith	Nominated	
2024	RTS Programme Awards	Leading Actor – Male	Gary Oldman	Nominated	
2024	British Academy Television Awards	Best Drama Series	Slow Horses	Nominated	
2024	British Academy Television Awards	Best Supporting Actor	Jack Lowden	Nominated	
2024	British Academy Television Craft Awards	Best Editing: Fiction	Sam Williams (for "Strange Games")	Won	
2024	British Academy Television Craft Awards	Best Editing: Fiction	Zsófia Tálas (for "Footprints")	Nominated	
2024	British Academy Television Craft Awards	Best Make-Up & Hair Design	Lucy Sibbick	Nominated	
2024	British Academy Television Craft Awards	Best Sound: Fiction	Andrew Sissons, Martin Jensen, Joe Beal, Lewis Todd, Conor Thompson, and Duncan Price	Won	
2024	Broadcast Digital Awards	Best Drama Programme	Slow Horses	Won	
2024	Edinburgh TV Awards	Best Drama	Slow Horses	Nominated	
2024	Edinburgh TV Awards	Best TV Actor – Drama	Gary Oldman	Nominated	
2024	Location Managers Guild International Awards	Outstanding Locations in a Contemporary Television Series	Ian Pollington and Nick Renner	Nominated	
2024	Primetime Creative Arts Emmy Awards	Outstanding Guest Actor in a Drama Series	Jonathan Pryce (for "Footprints")	Nominated	
2024	Primetime Creative Arts Emmy Awards	Outstanding Casting for a Drama Series	Nina Gold	Nominated	
2024	Primetime Creative Arts Emmy Awards	Outstanding Music Composition for a Series (Original Dramatic Score)	Daniel Pemberton and Toydrum (for "Strange Games")	Nominated	
2024	Primetime Creative Arts Emmy Awards	Outstanding Picture Editing for a Drama Series	Zsófia Tálas (for "Footprints")	Nominated	
2024	Primetime Emmy Awards	Outstanding Drama Series	Slow Horses (Note: Nominees: Graham Yost, Will Smith, Douglas Urbanski, Gail Mutrux, Iain Canning, Emile Sherman, Jane Robertson, Jamie Laurenson, Hakan Kousetta, Julian Stevens, and Simon Gillis)	Nominated	
2024	Primetime Emmy Awards	Outstanding Lead Actor in a Drama Series	Gary Oldman (for "Footprints")	Nominated	
2024	Primetime Emmy Awards	Outstanding Supporting Actor in a Drama Series	Jack Lowden (for "Hard Lessons")	Nominated	
2024	Primetime Emmy Awards	Outstanding Directing for a Drama Series	Saul Metzstein (for "Strange Games")	Nominated	
2024	Primetime Emmy Awards	Outstanding Writing for a Drama Series	Will Smith (for "Negotiating with Tigers")	Won	
2024	Venice TV Awards	Best TV Series	Slow Horses	Nominated	
2024	British Academy Cymru Awards	Best Actor	Siôn Daniel Young	Nominated	
2024	British Academy Scotland Awards	Best Director: Fiction	Saul Metzstein	Won	
2024	British Academy Scotland Awards	Favourite Scot on Screen	Jack Lowden	Nominated	
2024	Hollywood Music in Media Awards	Best Original Score in a TV Show/Limited Series	Daniel Pemberton and Toydrum	Nominated	
2024	Rose d'Or	Performance of the Year	Gary Oldman	Won	
2024	Astra TV Awards	Best Actor in a Streaming Drama Series	Gary Oldman	Nominated	
2025	Golden Globe Awards	Best Television Series – Drama	Slow Horses	Nominated	
2025	Golden Globe Awards	Best Performance by an Actor in a Television Series – Drama	Gary Oldman	Nominated	
2025	Golden Globe Awards	Best Performance by an Actor in a Supporting Role on Television	Jack Lowden	Nominated	
2025	The Operators Awards	Television Drama	Vince McGahon and James Harrison (for "Hello Goodbye")	Nominated	
2025	Broadcast Awards	Best Drama Series or Serial	Slow Horses	Nominated	
2025	AACTA International Awards	Best Drama Series	Slow Horses	Nominated	
2025	AACTA International Awards	Best Actor in a Series	Gary Oldman	Nominated	
2025	Critics' Choice Awards	Best Drama Series	Slow Horses	Nominated	
2025	Producers Guild of America Awards	Outstanding Producer of Episodic Television, Drama	Slow Horses	Nominated	
2025	AARP Movies for Grownups Awards	Best TV Series or Limited Series	Slow Horses	Nominated	
2025	AARP Movies for Grownups Awards	Best Actor – TV/Streaming	Gary Oldman	Nominated	
2025	Artios Awards	Outstanding Achievement in Casting for a Television Series – Drama	Nina Gold and Melissa Gethin Clarke	Won	
2025	BFE Cut Above Awards	Best Edited Series – Drama	Robert Frost and Harrison Wall	Nominated	
2025	Casting Directors' Guild Awards	Best Casting in a TV Drama Series	Nina Gold and Melissa Gethin Clarke	Nominated	
2025	ADG Excellence in Production Design Awards	Excellence in Production Design for a One-Hour Contemporary Single-Camera Series	Choi Ho Man (Note: Additional nominees: Oskars Vilnitis-Pantelejevs, Joanna Pratt, and Kamlan Man) (for "Returns")	Nominated	
2025	Satellite Awards	Best Drama Series	Slow Horses	Won	
2025	Satellite Awards	Best Actor in a Drama or Genre Series	Gary Oldman	Nominated	
2025	Satellite Awards	Best Actress in a Supporting Role in a Series, Miniseries, Limited Series, or Motion Picture Made for Television	Saskia Reeves	Nominated	
2025	Cinema Audio Society Awards	Outstanding Achievement in Sound Mixing for a Television Series – One Hour	Andrew Sissons and Martin Jensen (for "Hello Goodbye")	Nominated	
2025	USC Scripter Awards	Episodic Series	Will Smith (for "Hello Goodbye")	Nominated	
2025	AMPS Awards	Excellence in Sound for a Television Drama	Andrew Sissons, Ashley Reynolds, Martin Jensen, Joe Beal, Duncan Price, and Abbie Shaw (for "Hello Goodbye")	Won	
2025	Screen Actors Guild Awards	Outstanding Performance by a Male Actor in a Drama Series	Gary Oldman	Nominated	
2025	Screen Actors Guild Awards	Outstanding Performance by an Ensemble in a Drama Series	Ruth Bradley, Tom Brooke, James Callis, Christopher Chung, Aimee-Ffion Edwards, Rosalind Eleazar, Sean Gilder, Kadiff Kirwan, Jack Lowden, Gary Oldman, Jonathan Pryce, Saskia Reeves, Joanna Scanlan, Kristin Scott Thomas, Hugo Weaving, Naomi Wirthner, and Tom Wozniczka	Nominated	
2025	Golden Reel Awards	Outstanding Achievement in Music Editing – Broadcast Long Form	Ben Smithers (for "Returns")	Nominated	
2025	Golden Reel Awards	Outstanding Achievement in Sound Editing – Broadcast Long Form Dialogue and ADR	Joe Beal, Sophie Mapplebeck, Duncan Price, and Abbie Shaw (for "Hello Goodbye")	Nominated	
2025	ACE Eddie Awards	Best Edited Drama Series	Robert Frost (for "Identity Theft")	Nominated	
2025	RTS Programme Awards	Writer – Drama	Will Smith	Nominated	
2025	British Academy Television Awards	Best Actor	Gary Oldman	Nominated	
2025	British Academy Television Awards	Best Supporting Actor	Christopher Chung	Nominated	
2025	British Academy Television Awards	Best Supporting Actor	Jonathan Pryce	Nominated	
2025	British Academy Television Craft Awards	Best Editing: Fiction	Robert Frost (for "Identity Theft")	Won	
2025	British Academy Television Craft Awards	Best Original Music	Daniel Pemberton and Toydrum	Nominated	
2025	British Academy Television Craft Awards	Best Sound: Fiction	Andrew Sissons, Martin Jensen, Joe Beal, Alex Ellerington, Duncan Price, and Abbie Shaw	Won	
2025	Golden Trailer Awards	Best BTS/EPK for a TV/Streaming Series (Under 2 minutes)	"Who Meets Their Demise in Season 4?" (Apple TV+ / Intermission Film)	Won	
2025	Astra TV Awards	Best Drama Series	Slow Horses	Nominated	
2025	Astra TV Awards	Best Actor in a Drama Series	Gary Oldman	Nominated	
2025	Astra TV Awards	Best Writing in a Drama Series	Will Smith (for "Hello Goodbye")	Nominated	
2025	National Film Awards	Best Actor in a TV Series	Gary Oldman	Nominated	
2025	Broadcast Digital Awards	Programme of the Year (Non PSB Group)	Slow Horses	Nominated	
2025	Edinburgh TV Awards	Best Drama	Slow Horses	Nominated	
2025	Location Managers Guild International Awards	Outstanding Locations in a Contemporary Television Series	Ian Pollington, Nick Renner, and Stéphanie Perret	Nominated	
2025	Primetime Creative Arts Emmy Awards	Outstanding Casting for a Drama Series	Nina Gold and Melissa Gethin Clarke	Nominated	
2025	National Television Awards	Returning Drama	Slow Horses	Nominated	
2025	Primetime Emmy Awards	Outstanding Drama Series	Slow Horses	Nominated	
2025	Primetime Emmy Awards	Outstanding Lead Actor in a Drama Series	Gary Oldman (for "Identity Theft")	Nominated	
2025	Primetime Emmy Awards	Outstanding Directing for a Drama Series	Adam Randall (for "Hello Goodbye")	Won	
2025	Primetime Emmy Awards	Outstanding Writing for a Drama Series	Will Smith (for "Hello Goodbye")	Nominated	
2025	British Academy Scotland Awards	Favourite Scot on Screen	Kiran Sonia Sawar	Nominated	
2026	AARP Movies for Grownups Awards	Best Actor – TV/Streaming	Gary Oldman	Nominated	
2026	Golden Globe Awards	Best Television Series – Drama	Slow Horses	Nominated	
2026	Golden Globe Awards	Best Performance by a Male Actor in a Television Series – Drama	Gary Oldman	Nominated	
2026	USC Scripter Awards	Episodic Series	Will Smith (for "Scars")	Nominated	
2026	Broadcast Awards	Best Returning Drama	Slow Horses	Won	
2026	AACTA International Awards	Best Drama Series	Slow Horses	Nominated	
2026	AACTA International Awards	Best Actor in a Series	Gary Oldman	Won	
2026	The Operators Awards	Television Drama	Vince McGahon and James Harrison (for "Circus")	Nominated	
2026	Casting Directors' Guild Awards	Best Casting in a TV Drama Series	Nina Gold and Melissa Gethin Clarke	Nominated	
2026	Irish Film & Television Awards	Best Supporting Actress – TV Drama	Ruth Bradley	Nominated	
2026	Artios Awards	Outstanding Achievement in Casting for a Television Series – Drama	Nina Gold and Melissa Gethin Clarke	Nominated	
2026	ADG Excellence in Production Design Awards	Excellence in Production Design for a One-Hour Contemporary Single-Camera Series	Choi Ho Man (Note: Additional nominees: Oskars Vilnītis-Pantelejevs, Joanna Pratt, Kamlan Man, Tilly Scandrett, Kane Silks, Louise Vogel, David Tinto, Richard Usher, Alison Clements, Jo Regan, Will Rowe, Alasdair Dykes, and Nathalie Carraro) (for "Incommunicado" and "Tall Tales")	Nominated	
2026	Actor Awards	Outstanding Performance by a Male Actor in a Drama Series	Gary Oldman	Nominated	
2026	Satellite Awards	Best Drama Series	Slow Horses	Nominated	
2026	Satellite Awards	Best Actor in a Drama or Genre Series	Gary Oldman	Nominated	
2026	Satellite Awards	Best Actress in a Supporting Role in a Series, Miniseries, Limited Series, or Motion Picture Made for Television	Saskia Reeves	Nominated	
2026	RTS Programme Awards	Drama Series	Slow Horses	Nominated	
2026	RTS Programme Awards	Supporting Actor – Female	Saskia Reeves	Nominated	
2026	RTS Programme Awards	Supporting Actor – Male	Christopher Chung	Nominated	
2026	AMPS Awards	Excellence in Sound for a Television Drama	Andrew Sissons, Ashley Reynolds, Martin Jensen, Ben Tisdall, Joe Beal, Conor Thompson, and Duncan Price (for "Circus")	Nominated	
2026	BFE Cut Above Awards	Best Edited Series – Drama	Zsófia Tálas and Fiona Brands	Won	
2026	British Academy Television Craft Awards	Best Writer: Drama	Will Smith	Won	
2026	British Academy Television Craft Awards	Best Editing: Fiction	Fiona Brands (for "Scars")	Nominated	
2026	British Academy Television Craft Awards	Best Make-Up & Hair Design	Lucy Sibbick and Victoria Money	Nominated	
2026	British Academy Television Craft Awards	Best Sound: Fiction	Andrew Sissons, Martin Jensen, Ben Tisdall, Joe Beal, Conor Thompson, and Duncan Price	Nominated	
2026	Golden Trailer Awards	Best BTS/EPK for a TV/Streaming Series (Under 2 minutes)	"Jackson Lamb Shares “Words of Encouragement”" (Apple TV / Intermission Film)	Nominated	
2026	TRIC Awards	Drama Programme	Slow Horses	Nominated	
2026	Broadcast Digital Awards	Best Drama Programme	Slow Horses	Nominated	
2026	National Film Awards	Best Actor in a TV Series	Gary Oldman	Nominated	
2026	National Film Awards	Best Supporting Actor in a TV Series	Jack Lowden	Nominated	
2026	National Film Awards	Best Supporting Actress in a TV Series	Kristin Scott Thomas	Nominated	
2026	National Film Awards	Best Screenplay in a TV Series	Will Smith	Nominated	
2026	National Film Awards	Best Action in a Film/TV Series	Slow Horses	Nominated	
2026	Astra TV Awards	Best Actor in a Drama Series	Gary Oldman	Nominated	
2026	Edinburgh TV Awards	Best Drama	Slow Horses	Nominated	
2026	Edinburgh TV Awards	Best TV Actor – Drama	Gary Oldman	Nominated	
2026	Location Managers Guild International Awards	Outstanding Locations in a Contemporary Television Series	Ian Pollington and Nick Renner	Nominated	
2026	Primetime Creative Arts Emmy Awards	Outstanding Guest Actor in a Drama Series	Jonathan Pryce (for "Scars")	Nominated	
2026	Primetime Creative Arts Emmy Awards	Outstanding Casting for a Drama Series	Nina Gold and Melissa Gethin Clarke	Nominated	
2026	Primetime Creative Arts Emmy Awards	Outstanding Music Composition for a Series (Original Dramatic Score)	Daniel Pemberton and Toydrum (for "Missiles")	Nominated	
2026	Primetime Creative Arts Emmy Awards	Outstanding Production Design for a Narrative Contemporary Program (One Hour Or More)	Choi Ho Man, Oskars Vilnitis-Pantelejevs, and Kamlan Man (for "Incommunicado")	Nominated	
2026	Primetime Emmy Awards	Outstanding Drama Series	Slow Horses (Note: Nominees: Graham Yost, Will Smith, Douglas Urbanski, Gail Mutrux, Iain Canning, Emile Sherman, Jamie Laurenson, Hakan Kousetta, Julian Stevens, and Simon Gillis)	Nominated	
2026	Primetime Emmy Awards	Outstanding Lead Actor in a Drama Series	Gary Oldman (for "Tall Tales")	Nominated	
2026	Primetime Emmy Awards	Outstanding Supporting Actor in a Drama Series	Jack Lowden (for "Circus")	Nominated	
2026	Primetime Emmy Awards	Outstanding Directing for a Drama Series	Saul Metzstein (for "Scars")	Won	
2026	Primetime Emmy Awards	Outstanding Writing for a Drama Series	Will Smith (for "Scars")	Nominated	
2026	Seoul International Drama Awards	Best Miniseries	Slow Horses	Nominated	
2026	Seoul International Drama Awards	Best Actor	Gary Oldman	Nominated	
2026	Seoul International Drama Awards	Best Screenwriter	Will Smith	Nominated	
2026	British Academy Scotland Awards	Best Actor in Television	Jack Lowden	Nominated	
2026	Hollywood Music in Media Awards	Best Original Score in a TV Show/Limited Series	Daniel Pemberton	Nominated	
2027	Artios Awards	Outstanding Achievement in Casting for a Television Series – Drama	Nina Gold and Melissa Gethin Clarke	Pending	
