= Walmisley =

Walmisley is a surname, and may refer to:

- Gilbert Walmisley (1680–1751), English barrister
- John Walmisley
- Thomas Attwood Walmisley (1814–1856), English organist and composer, son of Thomas Forbes Walmisley
- Thomas Forbes Walmisley (1783–1866), English organist and composer
