= Mick Herron =

British novelist

Mick Herron FRSL
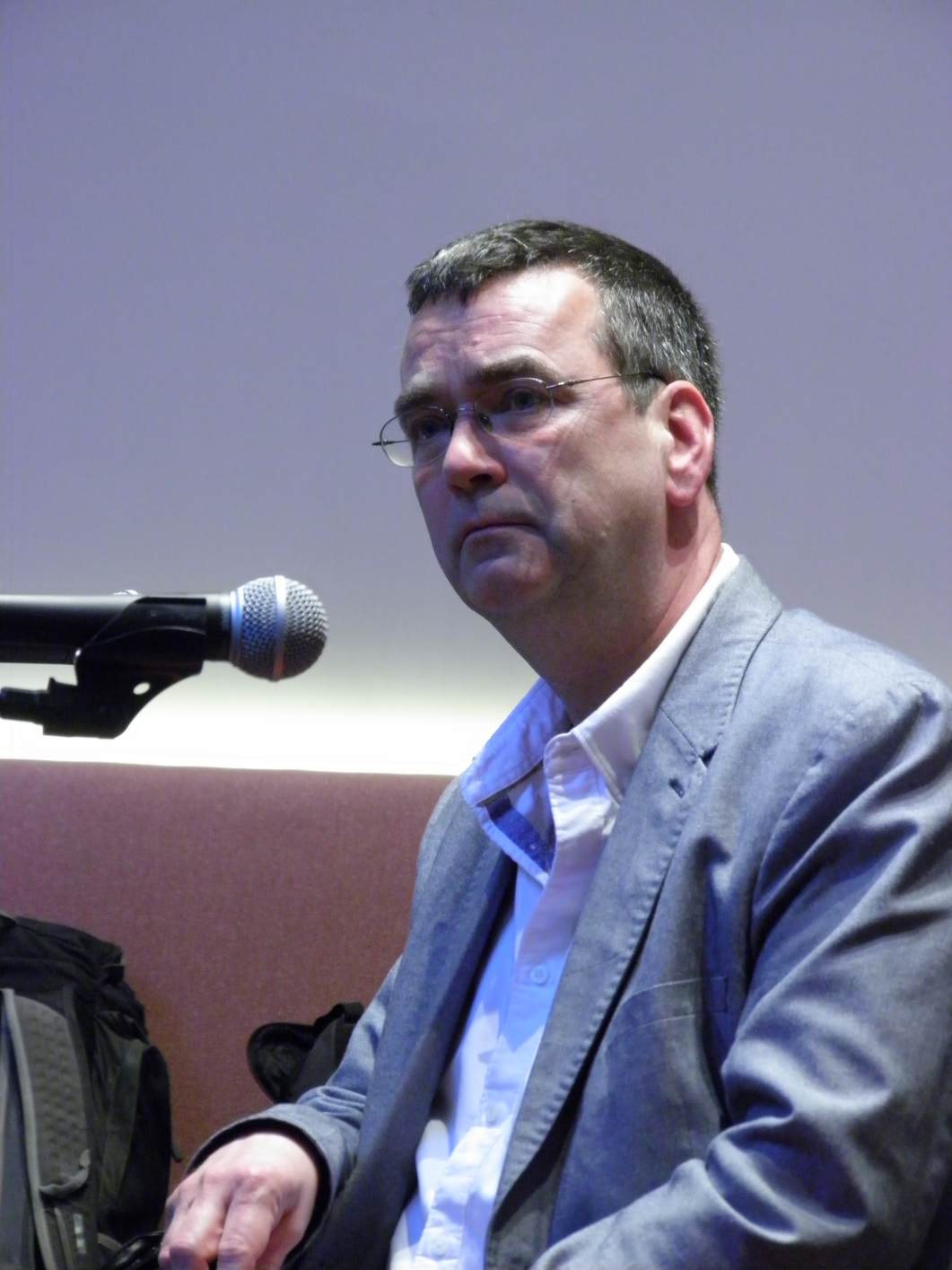
- Herron in 2018
- Born: Michael Herron; 11 July 1963 (age 63); Newcastle upon Tyne, England
- Education: Balliol College, Oxford
- Occupation: Novelist
- Partner: Jo Howard
- Children: 2
- Parent(s): James Herron (father); Annie Gunn (mother)
- Writing career
- Years active: 2003-present
- Genre: Spy fiction
- Notable work: Slough House (2010-present)
- Notable awards: Gold Dagger (2013); Diamond Dagger (2025)
- Website: Official website

Michael Herron FRSL (born 11 July 1963) is a English mystery and thriller novelist. He is the author of the Slough House series, which has been adapted into the Slow Horses television series. He won the Crime Writers' Association 2013 Gold Dagger for Dead Lions and the Diamond Dagger in 2025 for lifetime achievement.

== Early life ==
Herron was born in Newcastle upon Tyne, England, and educated at Balliol College, Oxford, where he earned a degree in English. He is one of six children; his father was an optician and his mother a nursery-school teacher.

== Career ==
Herron was a subeditor at IDS Employment Law Brief (Incomes Data Services), a trade journal on U.K. employment law.

Herron commuted from Oxford to London daily, returned home around 6 p.m., and wrote for an hour. In 2002, Herron had an office on a floor with few people, eventually hot-desking on a floor with hundreds of people. Herron resigned from IDS Employment Law Brief in 2017.

In 2003, Herron published his first novel, Down Cemetery Road. It was the first volume in a four-book series about Zoë Boehm, an Oxford private detective.

After the 7 July 2005 London bombings, as a London-Oxford commuter, he wanted to write about the UK security services.

In 2010, he began the Slough House spy series with the first volume, Slow Horses. The series concerns MI5 agents who have been exiled from the agency mainstream for various failures. The second volume, Dead Lions, published in 2013, won the Crime Writers' Association 2013 Gold Dagger. Herron has stated that the lead character, Jackson Lamb, was influenced by Reginald Hill's Andy Dalziel. As of September 2025, the series includes nine novels, plus several associated novellas. Early volumes have been adapted for television as Slow Horses.

Slow Horses was published by Constable in 2010, but the firm declined the opportunity to publish the next book in the series in the United Kingdom due to disappointing sales. Soho Press published the Slough House novels in the United States, and John Murray started republishing the series in the UK from 2015.

Herron's short stories have been regularly published in Ellery Queen's Mystery Magazine and some are collected in the book All the Livelong Day, published in 2013.

He was elected a Fellow of the Royal Society of Literature in 2024.

== Bibliography ==
=== Zoë Boehm series ===
1. Down Cemetery Road (2003)
2. The Last Voice You Hear (2004)
3. Why We Die (2006)
4. Smoke and Whispers (2009)

=== Slough House series ===
Slough House series
Number	Title	First published	Format	ISBN
1	Slow Horses	2010	novel	978-1473674189
2	Dead Lions	2013	novel	978-1616952259
2.5	The List	2015	novella	978-1616957452
3	Real Tigers	2016	novel	978-1616956127
4	Spook Street	2017	novel	978-1473621299
5	London Rules	2018	novel	978-1473657403
5.5	The Drop (US title: The Marylebone Drop)	2018	novella	978-1473678309
6	Joe Country	2019	novel	978-1473657441
6.3	The Catch	2020	novella	978-1529331707
6.7	The Last Dead Letter (Note: Originally collected in Dolphin Junction)	2020	novella	978-1529371260
7	Slough House	2021	novel	978-1529378641
8	Bad Actors	2022	novel	978-1529378702
8.3	Standing by the Wall	2022	novella	978-1399807081
8.7	Standing by the Wall (US release only)	2022	collection (Note: Slough House novellas: The List (2015); The Drop (2018); The Catch (2020); The Last Dead Letter (2020); Standing by the Wall (2022))	978-1641295031
9	Clown Town	2025	novel	978-1399800433
10	Watch the Quiet Snow	2026	compilation of novellas.	9781399839846

=== Standalone novels ===
Although not part of the Slough House series, Reconstruction, Nobody Walks, and The Secret Hours use some of the same characters. Reconstruction is set before Slow Horses, whereas Nobody Walks comes after The List and before Spook Street. The Secret Hours is set around the time of or after Bad Actors but includes a section set before the series begins.

- Reconstruction (2008)
- Nobody Walks (2015)
- This Is What Happened (2018)
- The Secret Hours (2023)

=== Short story collections ===
Dolphin Junction features five standalone crime fiction stories complemented by four mystery stories featuring characters Zoë Boehm and Joe Silvermann. It also includes tales with Jackson Lamb of Slough House. Standing by the Wall: The Collected Slough House Novellas includes all novellas in the Slough House series published as of 2022. "Proof of Love", "Mirror Images", and "The Other Half" are set before Down Cemetery Road, whereas "What We Do" comes after Why We Die.

- All the Livelong Day (2013)
  - "All the Livelong Day"
  - "The Usual Santas"
  - "Proof of Love" (Zoë Boehm)
  - "Mirror Images" (Zoë Boehm)
  - "Lost Luggage"
- Dolphin Junction (2021)
  - "Proof of Love" (Zoë Boehm)
  - "Remote Control"
  - "Lost Luggage"
  - "Mirror Images" (Zoë Boehm)
  - "Dolphin Junction"
  - "An American Fridge"
  - "The Other Half" (Zoë Boehm)
  - "All the Livelong Day"
  - "The Last Dead Letter" (Slough House)
  - "The Usual Santas"
  - "What We Do" (Zoë Boehm)
- Standing by the Wall: The Collected Slough House Novellas (2022)
  - The List (2015)
  - The Drop (US title: The Marylebone Drop) (2018)
  - The Catch (2020)
  - The Last Dead Letter (2020)
  - Standing by the Wall (2022)

== Adaptations ==
The Slough House series has been adapted for television under the name Slow Horses, starring Gary Oldman as Jackson Lamb, with the first six-part season, based on the book Slow Horses, streamed on Apple TV+ from 1 April 2022. The second season, based on Dead Lions, was filmed back-to-back with the first and premiered on 2 December 2022. It was announced in June 2022 that further seasons, adapting Real Tigers and Spook Street, had been greenlit. Season 3, based on Real Tigers, premiered on Apple TV+ on 29 November 2023. Season 5, based on London Rules, premiered on Apple TV+ on 24 September 2025. Season 6, based on both Joe Country and Slough House, premiered on Apple TV on September 16, 2026.

An Apple TV+ adaptation of Down Cemetery Road starring Emma Thompson and Ruth Wilson was released in October 2025. The second season was announced by Apple TV on 12 December 2025.

== Awards ==
Year	Nominated work	Award	Category	Result	Ref.
2009	"Dolphin Junction"	Ellery Queen's Mystery Magazine Readers Choice Award		Won	
2009	"Proof of Love"	Barry Award	Best Short Story	Shortlisted	
2010	Slow Horses	Crime Writers' Association Dagger Awards	CWA Ian Fleming Steel Dagger	Longlisted	
2013	Dead Lions	Crime Writers' Association Dagger Awards	Gold Dagger	Won	
2014	Dead Lions	Barry Award	Best Thriller	Shortlisted	
2014	Dead Lions	Macavity Awards	Best Mystery Novel	Shortlisted	
2015	Nobody Walks	Crime Writers' Association Dagger Awards	CWA Ian Fleming Steel Dagger	Shortlisted	
2016	Real Tigers	Crime Writers' Association Dagger Awards	CWA Ian Fleming Steel Dagger	Shortlisted	
2016	Real Tigers	Crime Writers' Association Dagger Awards	Gold Dagger	Shortlisted	
2017	Real Tigers	CrimeFest Awards	Last Laugh Award	Won	
2017	Real Tigers	Macavity Awards	Best Novel	Shortlisted	
2017	Real Tigers	Theakston Old Peculier Crime Novel of the Year Award		Shortlisted	
2017	Spook Street	Crime Writers' Association Dagger Awards	Gold Dagger	Shortlisted	
2017	Spook Street	Crime Writers' Association Dagger Awards	CWA Ian Fleming Steel Dagger	Won	
2018	Spook Street	British Book Awards	Crime and Thriller Book of the Year	Shortlisted	
2018	Spook Street	Barry Award	Best Thriller	Shortlisted	
2018	Spook Street	Theakston Old Peculier Crime Novel of the Year Award		Shortlisted	
2018	Spook Street	CrimeFest Awards	Last Laugh Award	Won	
2018	London Rules	Crime Writers' Association Dagger Awards	Gold Dagger	Shortlisted	
2018	London Rules	Crime Writers' Association Dagger Awards	CWA Ian Fleming Steel Dagger	Shortlisted	
2019	London Rules	CrimeFest Awards	Last Laugh Award	Shortlisted	
2019	London Rules	Barry Award	Best Thriller	Shortlisted	
2019	London Rules	Theakston Old Peculier Crime Novel of the Year Award		Shortlisted	
2019	London Rules	Capital Crime Festival Fingerprint Awards	Thriller Novel of the Year	Won	
2020	Joe Country	Theakston Old Peculier Crime Novel of the Year Award		Shortlisted	
2020	Joe Country	Crime Writers' Association Dagger Awards	Gold Dagger	Shortlisted	
2020	Dead Lions	Det Danske Kriminalakademi Palle Rosenkrantz Prize		Shortlisted	
2022	Slough House	Theakston Old Peculier Crime Novel of the Year Award		Won	
2022	Slough House	CrimeFest Awards	Last Laugh Award	Won	
2022	Slough House	Barry Award	Best Thriller	Shortlisted	
2022	Slow Horses	USC Scripter Awards		Won	
2023	Bad Actors	Theakston Old Peculier Crime Novel of the Year Award		Longlisted	
2023	Bad Actors	CrimeFest Awards	Last Laugh Award	Shortlisted	
2023	Bad Actors	Barry Award	Best Thriller	Shortlisted	
2023	Slow Horses	USC Scripter Awards		Won	
2024	The Secret Hours	CrimeFest Awards	Last Laugh Award	Won	
2024	The Secret Hours	Barry Award	Best Thriller	Shortlisted	
2024	The Secret Hours	International Thriller Writers Awards	Best Hardcover Novel	Shortlisted	
2024	The Secret Hours	British Book Awards	Crime and Thriller Book of the Year	Shortlisted	
2024	The Secret Hours	Capital Crime Festival Fingerprint Awards	Overall Crime Novel of the Year	Shortlisted	
2024	The Secret Hours	Crime Writers' Association Dagger Awards	Gold Dagger	Shortlisted	
2024	The Secret Hours	Theakston Old Peculier Crime Novel of the Year Award		Shortlisted	
2024	Spook Street	USC Scripter Awards		Shortlisted	
2025		Crime Writers' Association Dagger Awards	CWA Diamond Dagger	Won	
2025	London Rules	USC Scripter Awards		Shortlisted	
2026		British Book Awards	Author of the Year	Shortlisted	
2026	Clown Town	Barry Award	Best Thriller	Pending	
2026	Clown Town	Macavity Awards	Best Mystery Novel	Pending	

== Personal life ==
Herron lives in Oxford, England. His partner is Jo Howard, a recruiter in the publishing industry and leadership development consultant.
