= Robert Walmsley =

Robert Walmsley may refer to:

- Robert Walmsley (Royal Navy officer) (1941–2022)
- Robert Walmsley (anatomist) (1906–1998), Scottish anatomist
- Robert Mullineux Walmsley (1854–1924), British electrical pioneer
- Robert Walmsley (New York), (1885 1979) member of New York State Assembly
