= Thomas Walmsley =

Thomas Walmsley may refer to:

- T. Semmes Walmsley (Thomas Semmes Walmsley, 1889–1942), mayor of New Orleans, Louisiana
- Thomas Walmsley (judge) (1537–1612), English judge and politician
- Thomas Walmsley (died 1637), English politician
- Thomas Walmsley and Sons, a company that manufactured wrought iron
- Thomas Walmsley (anatomist) (1889–1951), Scottish anatomist
- Thomas Walmsley (painter) (1763–1805), English painter
