= Slough House (novel series) =

British spy novels

- 10th Anniversary cover of Slow Horses
- Slow Horses (2010); Dead Lions (2013); The List (2015 novella); Real Tigers (2016); Spook Street (2017); London Rules (2018); The Marylebone Drop (2018 novella); Joe Country (2019); The Catch (2020 novella); The Last Dead Letter (2020 novella); Slough House (2021); Bad Actors (2022); Standing by the Wall (2022 novella); Standing by the Wall (2022 collection); Clown Town (2025)
- Author: Mick Herron
- Country: United Kingdom
- Language: English
- Genre: Spy fiction
- Publisher: Hachette Book Group
- Published: 1 June 2010
- No. of books: 15 (9 novels, 5 novellas, 1 collection)

Slough House is a series of spy novels by the English author Mick Herron. Herron began writing the first volume, Slow Horses, in 2008, and published it in 2010.

The series follows River Cartwright and his colleagues, a group of humiliated MI5 agents, who have been relegated to paper-pushing jobs. They serve under a crude ageing Cold War-era agent, Jackson Lamb, and will do anything to get back into the game.

Herron's books have sold more than four million copies. They have been called a satirical, "rollicking subversion" of the stories of John le Carré.

== Plot synopsis ==
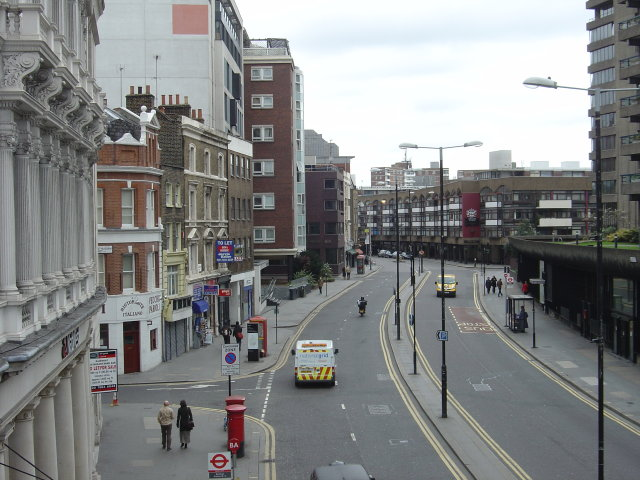
Location of the fictional Slough House on Aldersgate Street, at Carthusian Street, Farringdon, London, looking north from the skywalk at Barbican tube station. The housing development to the right, in the background, is the Golden Lane Estate. The housing development to the right, in the foreground, is the Barbican Estate.

Slough House is located not in Slough, but in the City of London near Barbican tube station. A slough is a wetland, usually a swamp, often a backwater. Appearing from the outside as an unassuming office building, Slough House is a dead end. It is a place where the British Intelligence service sends their rejects, failures and embarrassments—the "Slow Horses"—in the hope that they quit or prematurely retire. The office is overseen by Jackson Lamb, an ageing agent who cut his teeth during the Cold War and resents the Slow Horses who end up on his doorstep.

Everyone has a reason for being at Slough House. River Cartwright was in the final stages of assessment for MI5, when he made a mistake that shut down London King's Cross railway station. Min Harper was relegated for leaving confidential information on a train, Louisa Guy lost the tail of an important suspect, and Roddy Ho was cursed with an unpalatable personality. While River is desperate to get back to being a field agent, the closest Lamb will let him get is allowing him to search through people's rubbish.

Meanwhile, the management of MI5 at Regent's Park are bent on maintaining the service's budgets and improving its standing within society. Diana Taverner, the deputy-director, has no respect for the agents of Slough House and happily manipulates them as she sees fit, dangling the carrot of being pulled out of workplace purgatory.

Throughout the series, the agents of Slough House navigate the legacies of Cold War espionage, outwit threats to national security, and protect their team from higher powers in the intelligence service.

== Publishing history ==
Slow Horses was published in the United Kingdom by Constable in 2010. The book under-performed, and the publisher declined Herron's follow-up book Dead Lions. Herron struggled to find another publisher, since publishers were reluctant to publish a sequel for a book they hadn't released and were confused by the novel's blend of thriller and comedy elements.

Herron's follow-up novels Dead Lions and Real Tigers were released in the United States by Soho Press. Juliet Grames, who runs the Soho Crime Imprint, was energised by Herron's writing and decided to acquire rights for the series.

After a John Murray editor picked up a copy of Slow Horses at Liverpool Street station, the firm acquired the rights to release the series in the UK and published its editions of the first two books in 2015. While the release did not initially bear fruit, the series found success after Waterstones named Slow Horses its 'thriller of the month' in August 2017. Herron believes that the political turbulence of Brexit also played a large role in the series finding an audience.

I love the characters in this. The guy who is the head of the slow horses is this man who is the most thoroughly disagreeable person that many people will ever read about. I read an interview with Mick Herron where he said he just thought of the worst thing that anybody could say in every situation — and that's what River's boss said. It's just great fun. - Nancy Pearl

In 2017, the series became a breakout success in the US when Nancy Pearl discussed Slow Horses on NPR. Soho printed an additional 2,000 copies of the book which sold out in 24 hours; they would go on to sell 20,000 copies that month. Herron's books have sold more than four million copies.

British actor Seán Barrett voices the series's audiobook adaptations.

The Slough House series comprises nine novels and five novellas:

Slough House series
Number	Title	First published	Format	ISBN
1	Slow Horses	2010	novel	978-1473674189
2	Dead Lions	2013	novel	978-1616952259
2.5	The List	2015	novella	978-1616957452
3	Real Tigers	2016	novel	978-1616956127
4	Spook Street	2017	novel	978-1473621299
5	London Rules	2018	novel	978-1473657403
5.5	The Marylebone Drop	2018	novella	978-1473678309
6	Joe Country	2019	novel	978-1473657441
6.3	The Catch	2020	novella	978-1529331707
6.7	The Last Dead Letter (Note: Originally collected in Dolphin Junction)	2020	novella	978-1529371260
7	Slough House	2021	novel	978-1529378641
8	Bad Actors	2022	novel	978-1529378702
8.3	Standing by the Wall	2022	novella	978-1399807081
8.7	Standing by the Wall	2022	U.S. collection (Note: Slough House novellas: The List (2015); The Drop (2018); The Catch (2020); The Last Dead Letter (2020); Standing by the Wall (2022))	978-1641295031
9	Clown Town	2025	novel	978-1399800433
9.5	Watch the Quiet Snow	2026	U.K. collection	978-1399838771

=== Novellas ===
Herron has written five spinoff novellas/short stories; The List (2015), The Marylebone Drop (2018), The Catch (2020), The Last Dead Letter (2020) and Standing by the Wall (2022).

In 2022, the stories were published in a single print edition.

Standing by the Wall was inspired by Frank Capra's film It's a Wonderful Life.

=== Related novels ===
Three of Herron's other novels, Reconstruction (2008), Nobody Walks (2015) and The Secret Hours (2023), take place within the same world and feature characters from the series, but are not considered part of the main Slough House series.

Reconstruction follows "Bad Sam" Chapman as the Head of the Dogs and gives detail to his back story. Missing money, a runaway child, and a nursery hostage situation in Oxford are the main plot points of this debut novel.

Nobody Walks introduces us to a few familiar faces within the world of Slough House, including psych-eval's JK Coe (first appearance in The List), and Dame Ingrid Tearney, the formidable First Desk who uses the characters in this story as chess pieces on a board. It follows former Head Dog Tom Bettany, who is trying to discover how his son died.

The Secret Hours investigates the backgrounds of many characters that readers would immediately recognise, from Diana Taverner and Molly Doran to Jackson Lamb himself.

== Inspiration and writing ==
=== Genre ===
Herron has a broad range of influences from John le Carré, Len Deighton, Charles Dickens to Reginald Hill and P. G. Wodehouse. Herron began reading le Carré at the age of 14 and stated he "gave me permission to become a writer ... he showed me you could invent an entire world, invent its language too". Herron stated that le Carré's A Perfect Spy was the only "masterpiece" by one of his influences that he was able to read as a newly-released publication.

Herron has cited Reginald Hill's Andy Dalziel and John Finnemore's First Officer Douglas Richardson as character influences for Jackson Lamb. While Herron has denied intentionally making Lamb's name a homage to le Carré, the character's initials "J. Lamb" appear in Smiley's People.

=== Writing style ===
While many of England's renowned espionage writers like le Carré and Ian Fleming had previously been members of the Secret Service, Herron has no military or intelligence experience. Instead, he draws heavily in his writing from experiences while working in the legal department of an employment issues research firm. The specific details about the Security Service throughout his novels are fabrications.

Herron assumes the Security Service operates like any other workplace where "people are often doing quite dull jobs and working with other people who they don't necessarily like, with a lot of office politics going on". The Sydney Morning Herald's Sue Turnbull described Herron as being in "full flight", when he "revels in the inanity of the office politics that have blighted British bureaucracy".

Herron has discussed the importance of each novel having a different tone, colouring and mood. He allows his writing to be driven by character decisions, rather than strict plots. His rough outlines amount to a "series of disconnected events" with plot twists usually occurring when he needs to write himself out of a corner. Herron also refrains from creating extensive character backstories.

Herron writes in the third person and will often rotate points of view within the same scene. Glenn Harper from the Los Angeles Review of Books writes that Herron's sudden changes in perspective allow for "sudden and often funny revelations, when the false impression given by one point of view is clarified in a later episode or an alternative point of view".

While writing, Herron refrains from visualising the characters. He maintains "a vague sense of my eye on the page rather than a process in my head. It's more about the rhythm of the sentences". Herron credits the development of his writing style to early experiences writing poetry.

Herron views thematic patterning as an essential narrative glue within his work. Mortality, addiction and ancestral sin have been noted as themes throughout the series.

Several of the series's characters and events derive from contemporary history. The novel Slough House finds its roots in the poisoning of Sergei and Yulia Skripal, while The Catch has drawn comparisons to events of the life of Jeffrey Epstein. Herron has said that the book Clown Town was inspired by the story of alleged MI5 informant Freddie Scappaticci and the IRA. British politician Boris Johnson has also been noted by Herron as the basis for the fictional Tory politician Peter Judd.

Herron has said he is drawn to incorporating political elements into his stories as they "go hand in hand with the kind of espionage thriller I'm interested in. I don't want to write a big, plotted, evil-mastermind spy novel; I'm interested in incompetence, things going wrong, badly motivated stuff, and that's essentially our political reality now."

=== Background ===
In 2005, Herron was commuting to work when a series of bombs exploded around London. The experience caused Herron to shift from writing detective to spy fiction. While he did not feel qualified to write about world events, the bombings made him realise "to be on the front line, you just have to be in a city. Suddenly, everywhere seems to be a viable target. So that opened the door and allowed me to write about such things." Herron would later reference the morning during a scene in Slow Horses, where River Cartwright reflects:

People talked about that day in different ways. Either it was a story about them in which bombs happened, or it was a story about the bombs, and they'd just happened to be there.

Herron began writing the first novel in the series, Slow Horses, in 2008.

The site of Slough House was inspired by a building on Aldersgate street that Herron would pass on his commute.

== Reception ==
=== Critical response ===
While the Slow Horses book did not initially achieve mainstream success, an early review in The Booklist said Herron's novel was "filled with acidic wit and engaging misdirection... with enough suspense, double-dealing, and mayhem for thriller devotees; but it's also a wonderfully funny, farcical, deeply cynical skewering of politics, bureaucrats, turf wars, and the Great Game."

Several critics have also noted Herron's ability to structure tightly plotted stories and conjure up terrible offices and their politics. Writing in the Literary Review, Sam Leith stated that Herron's novels were "one of the least well-kept secrets in espionage fiction." Leith complimented Herron's ability as "a fine, often glorious sentence-by-sentence writer, and fiercely funny with his dialogue."

The second volume, Dead Lions, won the Crime Writers' Association 2013 Gold Dagger.

The fourth novel in the series, Spook Street, won the Ian Fleming Steel Dagger in 2017.

== TV series ==
The novels were adapted into a television series, Slow Horses, that premiered on Apple TV+ on 1 April 2022. The second series, Dead Lions, premiered on 2 December 2022. In June 2022, the series was renewed for a third and fourth series. The third series, Real Tigers, premiered on 29 November 2023, and the fourth series, Spook Street, on 4 September 2024. In January 2024, it was renewed for a fifth series, which was based on the fifth book in the series, London Rules. A sixth season was announced in October 2024, and premiered in September 2026. It is influenced by both Joe Country & Slough House, the sixth and seventh books in the series. Production of Season 7 already wrapped up in 2025, but the premier date is unknown. In September 2026 Apple TV announced ordering Season 8 which will adapt the book Clown Town.
