= List of river films and television series =

This is a List of river films and television series. The list includes films, TV series, and documentaries that take place on a river or are about rivers and river explorers.

Media	Title	Released	Country	Director	Notable cast	Notes
Feature	Jungle Cruise (film)	2021		Jaume Collet-Serra	Dwayne Johnson, Emily Blunt	Amazon River fantasy adventure
TV series	The River (American TV series)	2012	United States	Jaume Collet-Serra	Bruce Greenwald, Joe Anderson, Leslie Hope	Amazon River horror adventure supernatural
Independent film	Big River Man	2009		John Maringouin	Martin Strel, Borut Strel, Matthew Mohlke	Amazon River documentary
Independent film	The African Queen (film)	1951	United States	John Huston	Humphrey Bogart, Katharine Hepburn, Robert Morley	Adventure film
TV series	Nile (TV series)	2004	UK	Mike Gunton	Catherine Schell, Kenneth Haigh, Michael Gough	Documentary film
Film	The Bridge on the River Kwai	1957	UK/USA	David Lean	Alec Guinness, William Holden, Jack Hawkins	Based on a novel by Pierre Boulle; won seven Academy Awards
Film	Apocalypse Now	1979	USA	Francis Ford Coppola	Marlon Brando, Robert Duvall, Martin Sheen	Loosely based on the 1899 novella Heart of Darkness by Joseph Conrad, with the setting changed from late 19th-century Congo to the Vietnam War.
Film	Aguirre, the Wrath of God	1972	West Germany, Mexico, Peru	Werner Herzog	Klaus Kinski, Helena Rojo, Del Negro	After reading a half-page devoted to Lope de Aguirre, the filmmaker became inspired and immediately devised the story.
Film	Fitzcarraldo	1982	West Germany, Peru	Werner Herzog	Klaus Kinski, Claudia Cardinale, José Lewgoy	inspired by Peruvian rubber baron Carlos Fitzcarrald, who once transported a disassembled steamboat over the Isthmus of Fitzcarrald
Film	Deliverance	1972	USA	John Boorman	Jon Voight, Burt Reynolds, Ned Beatty	adapted by James Dickey from his 1970 novel of the same name.
Film	The River Wild	1994	USA	Curtis Hanson	Meryl Streep, Kevin Bacon, David Strathairn	Streep was nominated for a Golden Globe Award and a Screen Actors Guild Award while Bacon received a Golden Globe nomination.
Film	Mystic River	2003	United States	Clint Eastwood	Sean Penn, Tim Robbins, Kevin Bacon	Based on a novel by Dennis Lehane; won two Academy Awards
Film	The River	1984	USA	Mark Rydell	Mel Gibson, Sissy Spacek, Shane Bailey	
Film	A River Runs Through It	1992	United States	Robert Redford	Brad Pitt, Craig Sheffer, Tom Skerritt	Based on a novella by Norman Maclean; won an Academy Award for Best Cinematography
TV series	River	2015	UK	Abi Morgan	Stellan Skarsgård, Nicola Walker	A police procedural about a detective who is haunted by murder victims
Film	Wind River	2017	United States	Taylor Sheridan	Jeremy Renner, Elizabeth Olsen	A thriller about a murder investigation on an Indian reservation
Documentary	FLOW: For the Love Of Water	2008	USA/France/Canada	Irena Salina	Maude Barlow, Vandana Shiva, Erik D. Olson	An investigation into the growing privatization of the world's dwindling fresh water supply
Documentary	River	2022	Australia/UK/France/Germany/USA	Jennifer Peedom	Willem Dafoe, Robert Macfarlane	A cinematic journey through the world's great waterways and their cultural and ecological significance
Documentary	The Colorado River: Running Near Empty	2010	USA	Peter McBride	Peter McBride	A photographic and film journey down the Colorado River from source to sea
Documentary TV series	Der Rhein von oben	2013	Germany	?	?	A documentary series about the river Rhine
Documentary	Rivers of Life (TV series)	2019	UK/USA	Mark Flowers, Simon Blakeney	Michael J Hayes	Series exploring the natural history and cultural importance of the Nile, the Amazon, and the Yukon

(The category country refers to country of film or show production facilities)

== See also ==
=== Films titled 'River' ===
- River disambiguation page that lists the River titles:
- River (2007 film), a Canadian film by Mark Wihak
- River (2011 film), a Japanese film
- River (2015 Canadian film), a Canadian film by Jamie M. Dagg
- River (2015 Tibetan film), a Tibetan film
- River (TV series), a British television series
- River, a 2022 Australian film by Jennifer Peedom

=== Films titled 'The River' ===
- The River (1929 film), an American film by Frank Borzage
- The River (1933 film), a Czech film by Josef Rovenský
- The River (1938 film), an American film by Pare Lorentz
- The River (1951 film), a French film by Jean Renoir
- Nehir or The River, a 1977 Turkish film by Şerif Gören
- The River (1984 film), an American film by Mark Rydell
- The River (1997 film), a Taiwanese film by Tsai Ming-liang
- The River (2001 film), a Finnish film by Jarmo Lampela
- Reka (2002 film), a Russian film by Aleksey Balabanov
- The River (2018 film), a Kazakhstani film by Emir Baigazin

=== River Information ===
- Lists of rivers
- List of river systems by length
