= William Kunstler =

American attorney and civil rights activist (1919–1995)

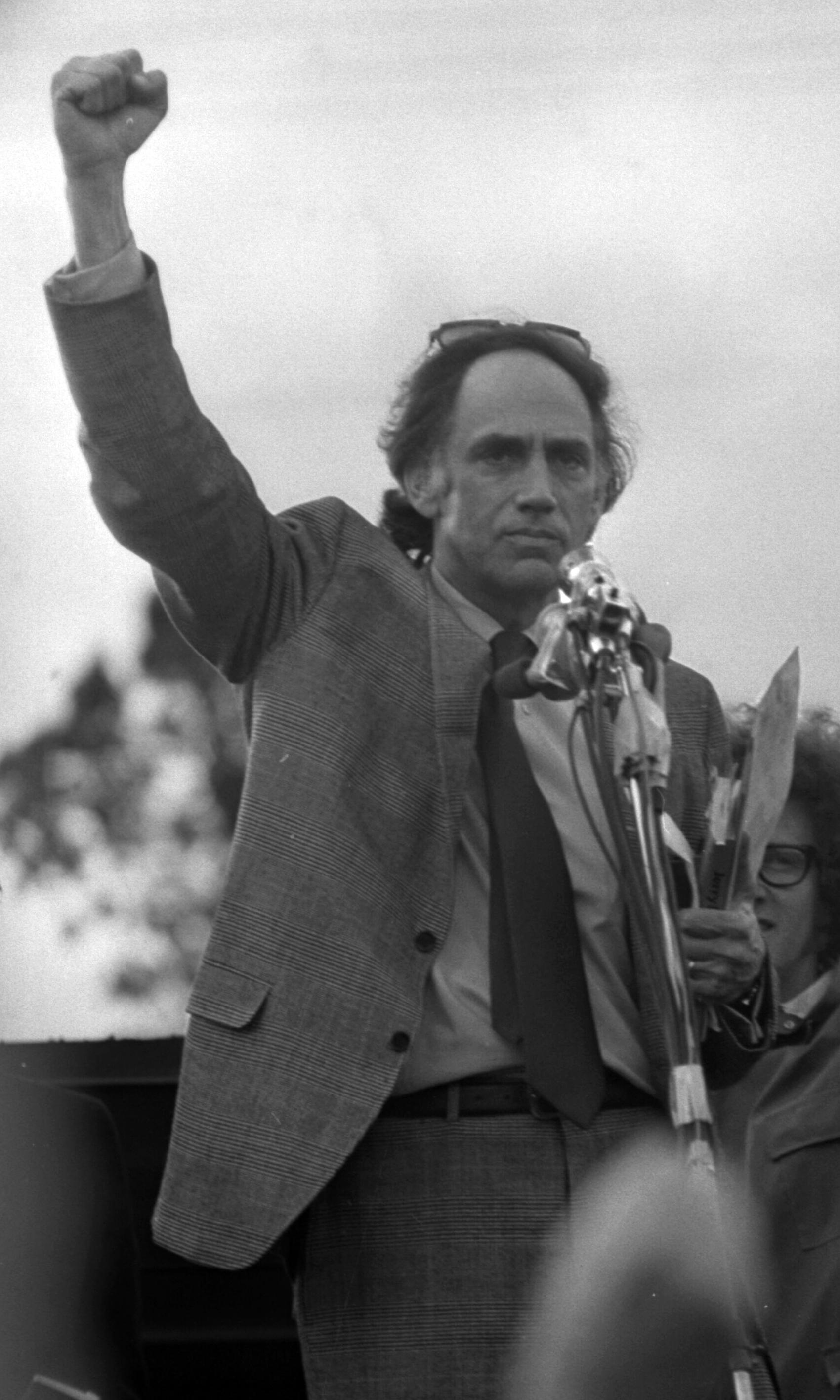
- Kunstler in 1970
- Born: William Moses Kunstler; July 7, 1919; New York City, U.S.
- Died: September 4, 1995 (aged 76); New York City, U.S.
- Education: Yale University (BA); Columbia University (LLB)
- Occupations: Attorney, civil rights activist
- Spouses: Lotte Kunstler; Margaret Ratner
- Children: 4, including Emily and Sarah

William Moses Kunstler (July 7, 1919 – September 4, 1995) was an American attorney and civil rights activist, known for defending the Chicago Seven. Kunstler was an active member of the National Lawyers Guild, a board member of the American Civil Liberties Union (ACLU) and the co-founder of the Center for Constitutional Rights (CCR), the "leading gathering place for radical lawyers in the country."

Kunstler's defense of the Chicago Seven from 1969 to 1970 led The New York Times to label him "the country's most controversial and, perhaps, its best-known lawyer". Kunstler is also well known for defending members of the Revolutionary Communist Party, Catonsville Nine, Black Panther Party, Weather Underground Organization, the Attica Prison rioters, Meir Kahane assassin El Sayyid Nosair, and the American Indian Movement. He also won a de facto segregation case regarding the District of Columbia's public schools and "disinterred, singlehandedly" the concept of federal criminal removal jurisdiction in the 1960s. Kunstler refused to defend right-wing groups, such as the Minutemen, on the grounds that "I only defend those whose goals I share. I'm not a lawyer for hire. I only defend those I love."

He was a polarizing figure; many on the right wished to see him disbarred, while many on the left admired him as a "symbol of a certain kind of radical lawyer." Even some other civil rights lawyers regarded Kunstler as a "publicity hound and a hit-and-run lawyer" who "brings cases on Page 1 and the NAACP Legal Defense Fund wins them on Page 68." Legal writer Sidney Zion quipped that Kunstler was "one of the few lawyers in town who knows how to talk to the press. His stories always check out and he's not afraid to talk to you, and he's got credibility—although you've got to ask sometimes, 'Bill, is it really true?'"

== Early life ==
Kunstler was born to a Jewish family in New York City, the son of Frances Mandelbaum and Monroe Bradford Kunstler, a physician. He attended DeWitt Clinton High School. After high school, he attended Yale University, where he majored in French and graduated Phi Beta Kappa in 1941. He then went on to attend Columbia Law School from which he graduated in 1948. While at Yale, Kunstler was an avid poet and represented Yale in the Glascock Prize competition at Mount Holyoke College.

Rejected twice by the United States Navy, Kunstler served in the U.S. Army during World War II in the Pacific theater. He volunteered for cryptography and served in New Guinea. He rose to the rank of major and received the Bronze Star. While in the army, he was noted for his theatrical portrayals in the Fort Monmouth Dramatic Association.

After his discharge from the Army, Kuntsler hoped to become a writer. However, he ultimately attended law school, probably at the encouragement of his younger brother, who hoped they would go into practice together. His classmates at Columbia included Constance Baker Motley, Roy Cohn, and his future law partner Arthur Kinoy. In 1948, he was admitted to the bar in New York and began practicing law. Kunstler went through R.H. Macy's executive training program in the late 1940s and practiced family and small-business law in the 1950s, before entering civil-rights litigation in the 1960s. He was an associate professor of law at New York Law School (1950–1951).

Kunstler won honorable mention for the National Legal Aid Association's press award in 1957 for his series of radio broadcasts on WNEW, The Law on Trial. At WNEW, Kunstler also conducted interviews on controversial topics, such as the Alger Hiss case, on a program called Counterpoint.

== Civil rights career ==
=== Rise to prominence (1957–1964) ===
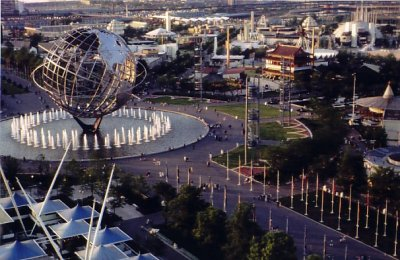
Kunstler represented the first Title IX federal removal cases under the Civil Rights Act of 1964: protesters at the 1964 New York World's Fair.

Kunstler began to garner sustained media attention in 1957, when he unsuccessfully defended the journalist William Worthy. A correspondent for the Baltimore Afro-American, Worthy was one of 42 Americans who had their passports seized after violating the State Department's travel ban on Communist China (after attending a Communist youth conference in Moscow). Kunstler refused a State Department compromise, which would have returned Worthy's passport if he agreed to cease visiting Communist countries, a condition that Worthy considered unconstitutional.

Kunstler played an important role as a civil rights lawyer in the 1960s, traveling to many of the segregated battlegrounds to work to free those who had been jailed. Working on behalf of the ACLU, Kunstler defended the Freedom Riders in Mississippi in 1961. He filed for a writ of habeas corpus with Sidney Mize, a federal judge in Biloxi, and appealed to the Fifth Circuit; he also filed similar pleas in state courts. Judge Leon Hendrick in Hinds County refused Kunstler's motion to cancel the mass appearance (involving hundreds of miles of travel) of all 187 convicted riders. The riders were convicted in a bench trial in Jackson and appealed to a county jury trial, where Kunstler argued that the county systematically discriminated against African-American jurors.

In 1962, Kunstler took part in efforts to integrate public parks and libraries in Albany, Georgia. Later that year, he published The Case for Courage (modeled on President Kennedy's Profiles in Courage) highlighting the efforts of other lawyers who risked their careers for controversial clients, as well as similar acts by public servants. At the time of the publication, Kunstler was already well known for his work with the Freedom Riders, his book on the Caryl Chessman case, and his radio coverage of trials. Kunstler also joined a group of lawyers criticizing the application of Alabama's civil libel laws and spoke at a rally against HUAC.

In 1963, for the Gandhi Society of New York, Kunstler filed to remove the cases of more than 100 arrested African-American demonstrators from the Danville Corporation Court to the Charlottesville District Court, under a Reconstruction Era statute. Although the district judge remanded the cases to city court, he dissolved the city's injunction against demonstrations. In doing so, Judge Thomas J. Michie rejected a Justice Department amicus curiae brief urging the removal to create a test case for the statute. Kunstler appealed to the Fourth Circuit. That year, Kunstler also sued public-housing authorities in Westchester County.

In 1964, Kunstler defended a group of four accused of kidnapping a white couple, and succeeded in getting the alleged weapons thrown out as evidence, as they could not be positively identified as those used. That year, he also challenged Mississippi's unpledged elector law and racial segregation in primary elections; he also defended three members of the Blood Brothers, a Harlem gang, charged with murder.

Kunstler went to St. Augustine, Florida, in 1964 during the demonstrations led by Dr. Martin Luther King Jr. and Dr. Robert B. Hayling, which put added pressure on Congress to pass the landmark Civil Rights Act of 1964. Kunstler brought the first federal case under Title IX of the Civil Rights Act of 1964, which allowed the removal of cases from county court to be appealed; the defendants were protestors at the 1964 New York World's Fair.

=== ACLU director (1964–1972) ===
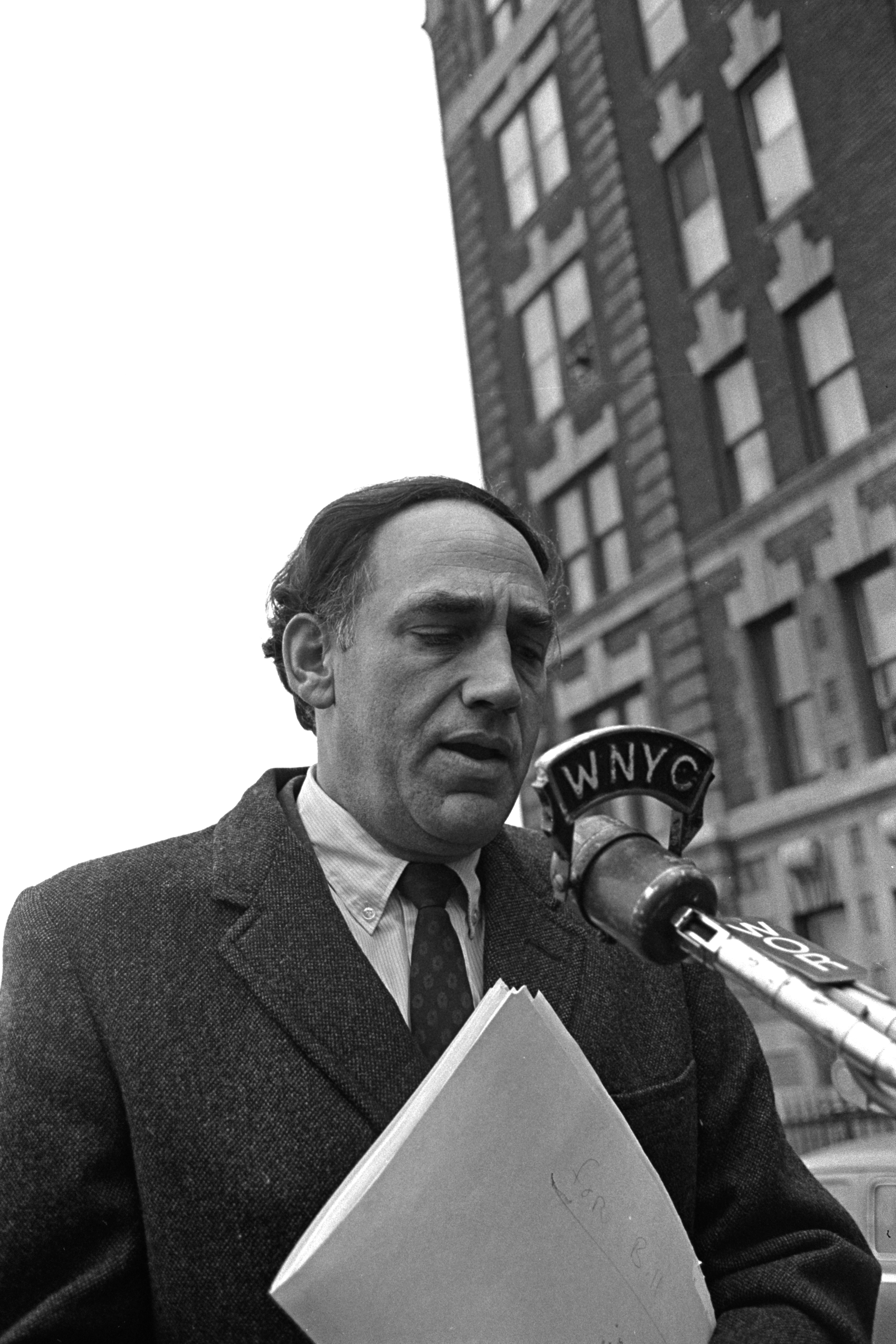
Kunstler at the dedication of Freedom Place in Manhattan, named for slain civil rights activists James Chaney, Andrew Goodman, and Michael Schwerner, November 25, 1967

He was a director of the American Civil Liberties Union (ACLU) from 1964 to 1972, when he became a member of the ACLU National Council. In 1966, he co-founded the Center for Constitutional Rights. Kunstler also worked with the National Lawyers Guild.

In 1965, Kunstler's firm - Kunstler, Kunstler, and Kinoy - was asked to defend Jack Ruby by his brother Earl, but dropped the case because they "did not wish to be in a situation where we have to fight to get into the case". Ruby was eventually permitted to replace his original defense team with Kunstler, who got him a new trial. In 1966, he also defended an arsonist who burned down a Jewish Community Center, killing 12, because he was not provided a lawyer before he signed a confession.

Kunstler's other notable clients include: Salvador Agron, H. Rap Brown, Lenny Bruce, Stokely Carmichael, the Catonsville Nine, which included Philip and Daniel Berrigan, Angela Davis, Larry Davis, Gregory Lee Johnson, Martin Luther King Jr., Gary McGivern, Adam Clayton Powell Jr., Filiberto Ojeda Rios, Assata Shakur, Lemuel Smith, Morton Sobell, Wayne Williams, and Michael X.

=== Chicago Seven (1969–1972) ===
While defending the Chicago Seven, he put the war in Vietnam on trial – asking Judy Collins to sing "Where Have All The Flowers Gone" from the witness stand, placing a Viet Cong flag on the defense table, and wearing a black armband to commemorate the war dead.

— Ron Kuby, in his 1995 eulogy of Kunstler.

Kunstler gained national renown for defending the Chicago Seven (originally Chicago Eight), in a five-month trial in 1969–1970, against charges of conspiring to incite riots in Chicago during the 1968 Democratic National Convention. Under cross-examination, Kunstler got a key police witness to contradict his previous testimony and admit that he had not witnessed Jerry Rubin, but had rather been given his name two weeks later by the FBI. Another prosecution witness, photographer Louis Salzberg, admitted under Kunstler's cross-examination that he was still on the payroll of the FBI.

The trial was marked by frequent clashes between Kunstler and U.S. Attorney Thomas Foran, with Kunstler taking the opportunity to accuse the government of failing to "realize the extent of antiwar sentiment". Kunstler also sparred with Judge Julius Hoffman, on one occasion remarking (with respect to the number of federal marshals): "this courtroom has the appearance of an armed camp. I would note that the Supreme Court has ruled that the appearance of an armed camp is a reversible error". During one heated exchange, Kunstler informed Hoffman that his entry in Who's Who was three times longer than the judge's, to which the judge replied: "I hope you get a better obituary." Kunstler and co-defense attorneys Leonard Weinglass, Michael Kennedy, Gerald Lefcourt, Dennis Roberts and Michael Tigar were cited for contempt (the convictions were later overturned unanimously by the Seventh Circuit). If Hoffman's contempt conviction had been allowed to stand, Kunstler would have been imprisoned for an unprecedented four years.

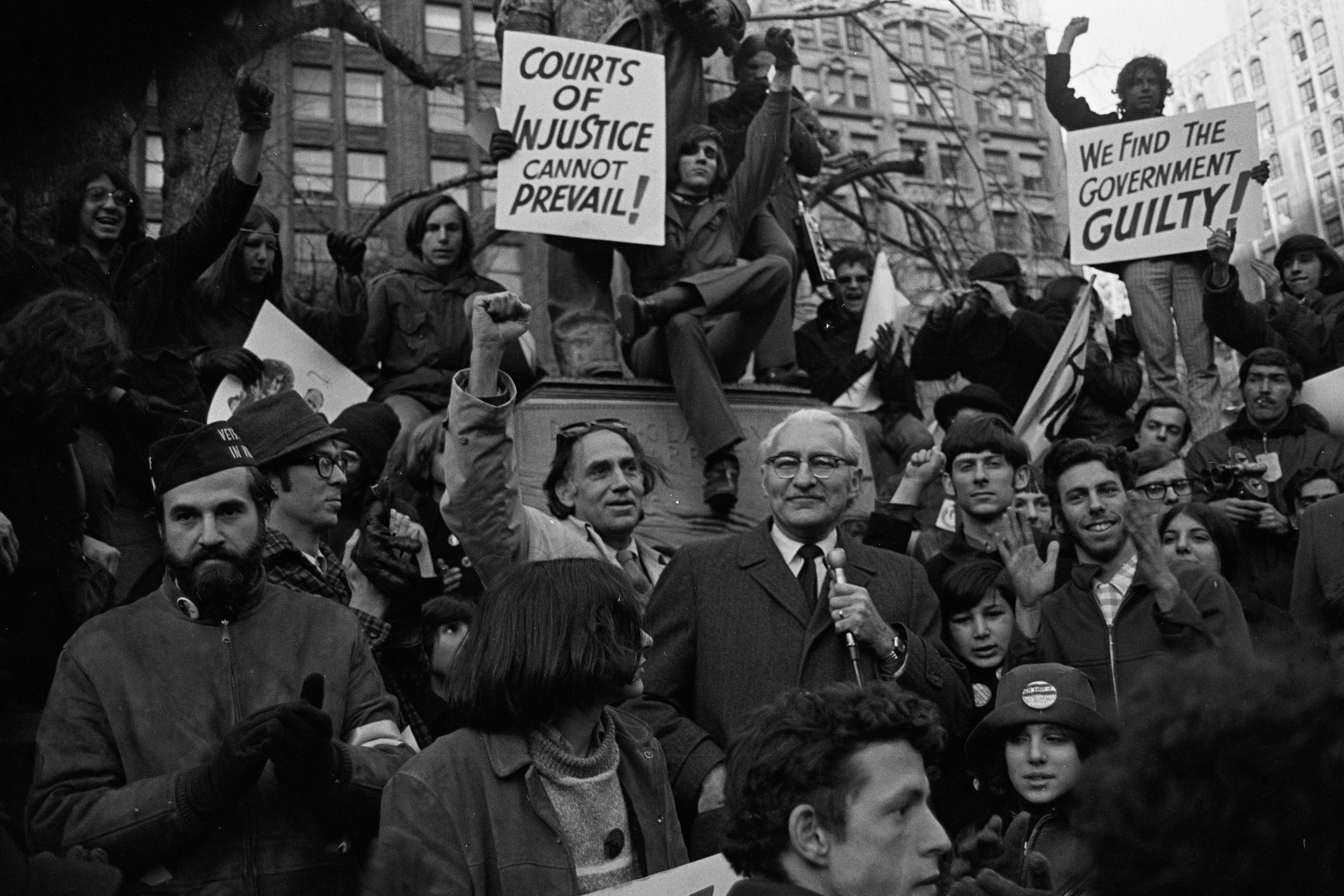
Kunstler at a rally in support of the Chicago Seven, February 23, 1970

The progress of the trial—which had many aspects of guerrilla theater—was covered on the nightly news and made Kunstler the best-known lawyer in the country, and something of a folk hero. After much deadlock, the jury acquitted all seven on the conspiracy charge, but convicted five of violating the anti-riot provisions of the Civil Rights Act of 1968. The Seventh Circuit overturned all the convictions on November 21, 1972, due to Hoffman's refusal to let defense lawyers question the prospective jurors on racial and cultural biases; the Justice Department did not retry the case.

Shortly after the 1968 Democratic Convention, Tom Hayden, Rennie Davis, Abbie Hoffman, Jerry Rubin, Dave Dellinger, and Robert Greenblatt received subpoenas to appear before the House Un-American Activities Committee (HUAC). Kunstler and co-counsel, Michael Kennedy, were among the group's six defense attorneys.

On the opening day of the HUAC hearings, the subpoenaed men and their lawyers, including Kunstler and Kennedy, staged a “stand-in” to protest the investigations. “The Constitution is being raped and we as lawyers are being emasculated in an armed camp,” Kennedy shouted at the hearing.

=== American Indian Movement (1973–1976) ===
Kunstler arrived in Pine Ridge, South Dakota, on March 4, 1973, to draw up the demands of the American Indian Movement (AIM) members involved in the Wounded Knee incident. Kunstler, who headed the defense, called the trial "the most important Indian trial of the 20th century", attempting to center the defense on the Treaty of Fort Laramie (1868). Kunstler's team represented Russell Means and Dennis Banks, two of the leaders of the occupation.

Kunstler objected to the heavy trial security on the grounds that it could prejudice the jury and Judge Fred J. Nichol agreed to ease measures. The trial was moved to Minnesota. Two authors and three Sioux were called as defense witnesses, mostly focusing on the historical (and more recent) injustice against the Sioux on the part of the U.S. government, shocking the prosecution.

In 1975, Kunstler defended AIM members Robert Robideau and Darrelle Butler in the slaying of two FBI agents, Jack Coler and Ronald Williams, at Pine Ridge Indian Reservation, not far from the site of the Wounded Knee incident. Butler and Robideau had become involved in the shootout in which Coler and Williams were killed after running to the aid of other AIM members who were shooting at the agents; Kunstler argued that "an atmosphere of fear and violence" existed between the FBI and the AIM, and as a result Butler and Robideau had feared for their lives when they heard gunfire and acted in perceived self-defense. At the trial in 1976, Kunstler subpoenaed prominent government officials to testify about the existence of a Counter-Intelligence Program (COINTELPRO) against Native American activists. District Judge Edward J. McManus approved Kunstler's attempt to subpoena FBI director Clarence M. Kelley. Robideau and Butler were ultimately acquitted, with the jury agreeing with Kunstler's argument that they had acted in fear for their lives. Leonard Peltier, who had also participated in the shootout, was later convicted of the murders; he did not retain Kunstler to defend him.

Kunstler also defended a Native American woman who refused to send her daughter with muscular dystrophy to school.

=== Attica (1974–1976) ===
In 1974–1975, Kunstler defended a prisoner charged with killing a guard during the Attica Prison riot. Under cross-examination, Kunstler forced Correction Officer Donald Melven to retract his sworn identification of John Hill, Kunstler's client, and Charles Pernasilice (defended by Richard Miller), admitting he still retained "slight" doubts that he confessed to investigators at the time of the incident. Kunstler focused on pointing out that all the other prosecution witnesses were testifying under reduced-sentencing agreements and called five prison inmates as defense witnesses (Miller called none), who testified that other prisoners hit the guard.

Despite Justice King's repeated warnings to Kunstler to "be careful, sir", Kunstler quickly became "the star of the trial, the man the jurors watch most attentively, and the lawyer whose voice carries most forcefully". Although the prosecution was careful to avoid personal confrontation with Kunstler, who frequently charmed the jury with jokes, on one occasion, Kunstler provoked a shouting match with the lead prosecutor, allegedly to wake up a sleeping jury member. The jury convicted Hill of murder and Pernasilice of attempted assault. When Kunstler protested that the defendants would risk being murdered due to the judges remanding them, King threatened to send Kunstler with them. New York Governor Hugh Carey granted executive clemency to Hill and the other inmates in 1976, even though Hill's name was not on the recommended list of pardons delivered to the governor and his appeals were still pending.

In June, Kunstler and Barbara Handshu, representing another inmate at Attica, Mariano Gonzales, asked for a new hearing on the role of FBI informant Mary Jo Cook.

=== Assata Shakur (1977) ===
Kunstler joined the defense staff of Assata Shakur in 1977, charged in New Jersey with a variety of felonies in connection with a 1973 shootout with New Jersey State Troopers. Shakur, sentenced to life imprisonment, in early 1979 escaped from prison. In 1984, Shakur was granted asylum in Cuba by Fidel Castro, who called the charges “an infamous lie". William Kunstler told reporters in 1979 that Shakur's health had declined in prison; he said: “I was very happy that she escaped because I thought she was unfairly tried".

=== Collaboration with Ron Kuby (1983–1995) ===
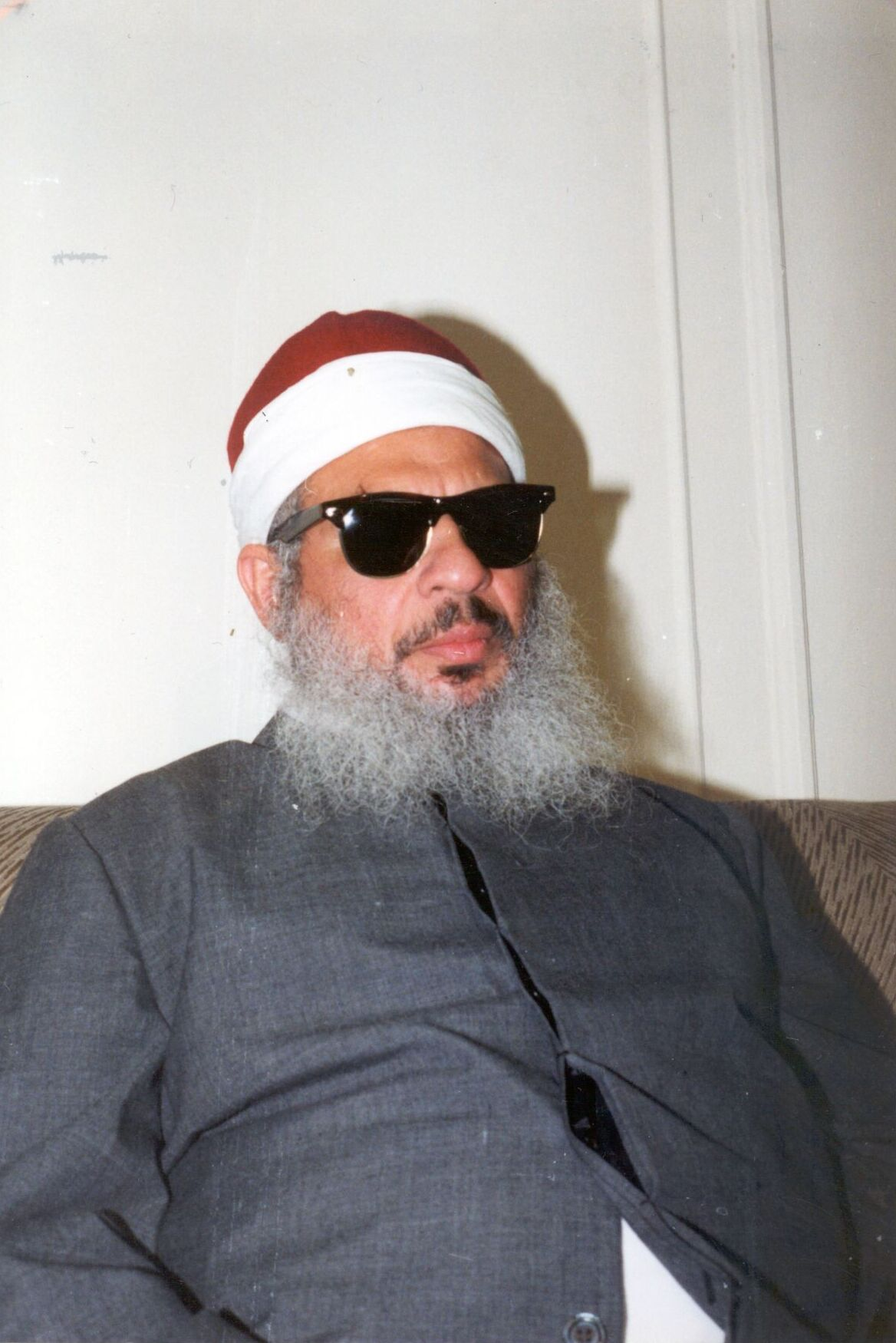
At the time of Kunstler's death, he was defending Omar Abdel-Rahman ("the Blind Sheik") for the 1993 World Trade Center bombing.

From 1983 until Kunstler's death in 1995, Ron Kuby was his partner. The two took on controversial civil-rights and criminal cases, including: El Sayyid Nosair who was charged with assassinating Rabbi Meir Kahane in 1990 in New York City [The jury acquitted Nosair of Kahane's murder but the judge in the case overruled the jury's decision and sentenced him to 71/3 to 22 years in prison, the maximum allowed]; Sheikh Omar Abdel-Rahman, head of the Egyptian-based terrorist group Gama'a al-Islamiyah, and nine others, including Nosair and Nosair's cousin Ibrahim A. Elgabrowny, some of which were found responsible for the 1993 World Trade Center bombing; Colin Ferguson, the man responsible for the 1993 Long Island Rail Road shooting, who would later reject Kuby and Kunstler's legal counsel and choose to represent himself at trial; Qubilah Shabazz, the daughter of Malcolm X, accused of plotting to murder Louis Farrakhan of the Nation of Islam; Glenn Harris, a New York City public-school teacher who absconded with a 15-year-old girl for two months; Nico Minardos, a flamboyant actor indicted by Rudy Giuliani for conspiracy to ship arms to Iran; Darrell Cabey, one of the persons shot by Bernard Goetz; and associates of the Gambino crime family.

Kunstler's defense of the three clerics made him "more visible, more venerated, more vilified than ever".

During the first Gulf War, they represented dozens of American soldiers who refused to fight and claimed conscientious objector status.

== Representation of mobsters ==
Kunstler represented a number of convicted mafiosi during his career, claiming "they were victims of government persecution", and said to have "never made a nickel on an OC [organized crime] case". The more notorious of Kunstler's mobster clients included Joe Bonanno, Raymond L.S. Patriarca, Nicholas L. Bianco, John Gotti, and Louis Ferrante, who claimed in his memoir, Unlocked: the Life and Crimes of a Mafia Insider, that Kunstler "took a hundred grand off me."

== Other work ==
Kunstler represented Larry Layton, one of the accused killers, at the behest of People's Temple (PT) founder Jim Jones, of Congressman Leo Ryan, who in November 1978 had ventured to Jonestown, the PT settlement in Guyana, South America, to investigate the allegations by family members and dissidents that the PT (which had built its reputation on deceptive alliances with populist Christian, anti-racist and then left-wing and universalist causes) was a cult riven with torture, sexual abuse, corruption and mass suicide drills. Layton disguised himself as a defector and initiated the gunfire on November 18 against Ryan and his secretary and accompanying journalists, following which Jim Jones ordered and then enforced the deaths of more than 900 people, almost one-third of them children, as a purported act of revolution. This was the vast majority of followers in Jonestown. Layton was a cult member whose sister, Deborah Layton, was one of those whose fleeing triggered the leader's increasing paranoia, and in her memoir describes the brainwashed and totalist (psychiatrist Robert Lifton) environment of the PT. Kuntsler's defense was premised on the idea that Layton was not personally responsible.On December 1, 1986, the jury returned a verdict of guilty on all counts. On March 3, 1987, Layton was sentenced to fifteen years imprisonment on counts 1, 3, and 4, and to life in prison on count 2 And was released in April 2002

In 1979, Kunstler represented Marvin Barnes, an ABA and NBA basketball player, with past legal troubles and league discipline problems. (On September 8, 2014, Barnes died at the age of 62) In 1981, Kunstler defended boxer James Scott at his second murder trial, which ended with Scott being found guilty of murder.

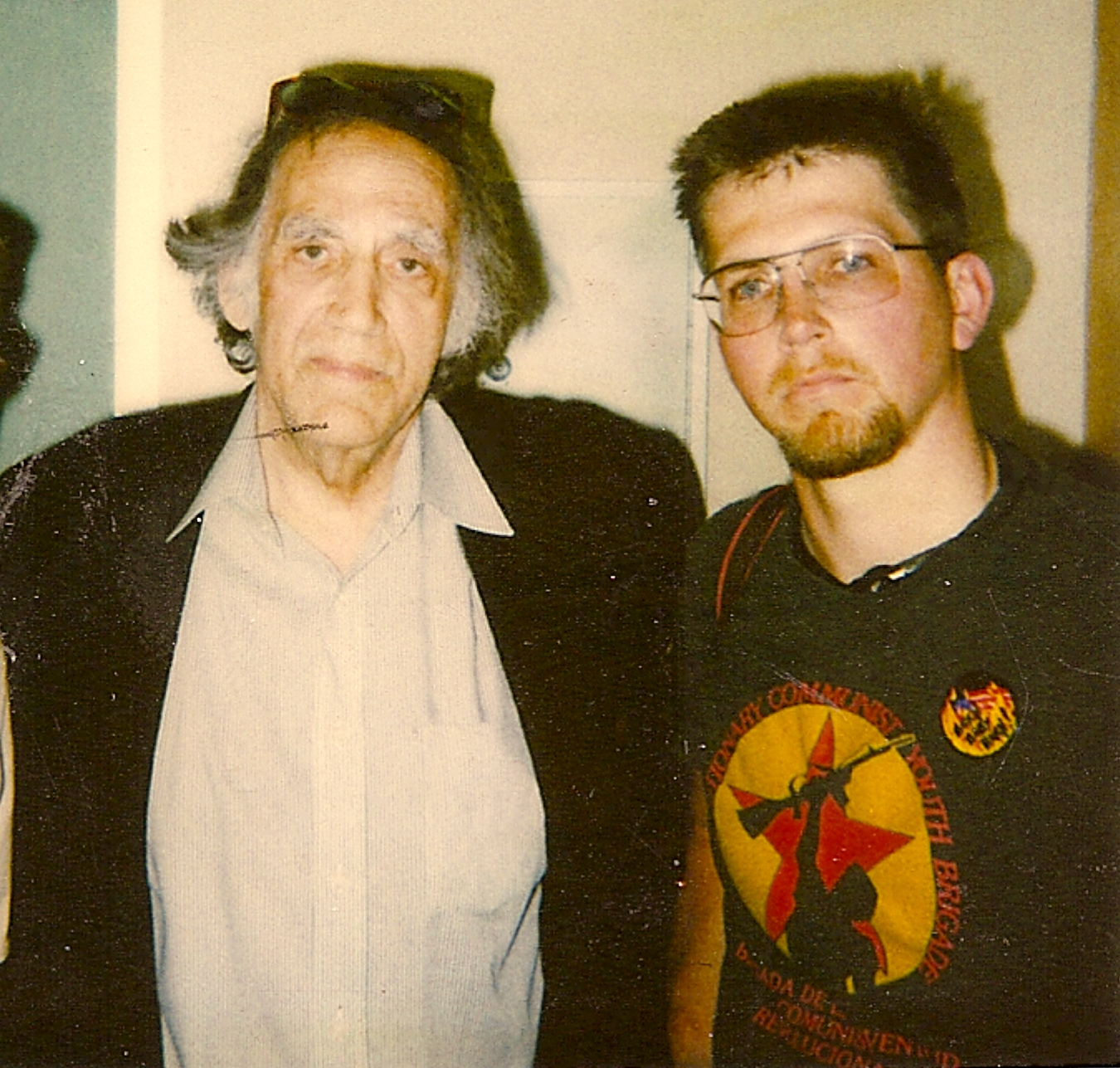
Kunstler and Johnson after a talk at the Bronx High School of Science, c. 1989

In 1989–1990, Kunstler twice argued successfully in defense of flag burning, before the Supreme Court. In Texas v. Johnson and United States v. Eichman, the Court held the act to be protected speech under the First Amendment, striking down Texas state and Federal statutes on "flag desecration". However, content-neutral restrictions may still be imposed to regulate the time, place, and manner of such expression. If the flag that was burned was someone else's property (as it was in the Johnson case, since Johnson had stolen the flag from a Texas bank's flagpole), the offender could be charged with petty larceny (a flag usually sells at retail for less than US$20), or with destruction of private property, or possibly both. Desecration of a flag representing a minority group may also be used in some jurisdictions to support the prosecution of a crime as a hate crime

Kunstler appeared as a lawyer in the movie The Doors in 1991, as a judge in the movie Malcolm X in 1992, and as himself in several television documentaries.

In 1993 Kunstler represented Yusuf Saalam of the Central Park 5 during his appeal, a move which alienated several friends. After Kunstler's death Saalam would be proven innocent when Matias Reyes confessed and DNA proved that Reyes was the sole attacker.

In 1994, Kunstler appeared as himself in an episode of Law & Order titled "White Rabbit," defending a woman charged with the 1971 murder of a policeman during the robbery of an armored car. The episode was based on the real-life story of Katherine Ann Power, who turned herself in to authorities in 1993.

== Death and legacy ==
In late 1995, Kunstler died in New York City of heart failure at the age of 76. In his last major public appearance, at the commencement ceremonies for the University at Buffalo's School of Architecture and Planning, Kunstler lambasted the death penalty, saying: "We have become the charnel house of the Western world with reference to executions; the next closest to us is the Republic of South Africa." Ron Kuby, in his eulogy of Kunstler, said: "While defending the Chicago Seven, [Kunstler] put the war in Vietnam on trial, asking Judy Collins to sing 'Where Have All The Flowers Gone?' from the witness stand, placing a Viet Cong flag on the defense table, and wearing a black armband to commemorate the war dead."

William Kunstler was survived by his wife Margaret Ratner Kunstler (who was previously married to Kunstler's close friend Michael Ratner) and his four daughters Karin Kunstler Goldman, Jane Drazek, Sarah Kunstler and Emily Kunstler, and several grandchildren.

Emily Kunstler and Sarah Kunstler produced a documentary about their father entitled William Kunstler: Disturbing the Universe, which had a screening as part of the Documentary Competition of the 2009 Sundance Film Festival.

== Publications ==
- Our Pleasant Vices (1941)
- The Law of Accidents (1954)
- First Degree (1960)
- Beyond a Reasonable Doubt? The Original Trial of Caryl Chessman (1961)
- The Case for Courage: The Stories of Ten Famous American Attorneys Who Risked Their Careers in the Cause of Justice. New York: Morrow (1962)
- And Justice For All (1963)
- The Minister and the Choir Singer: The Hall-Mills Murder Case (1964)
- Deep in My Heart. New York: Morrow (1966)
- Trials and Tribulations (1985)
- My Life as a Radical Lawyer (1994)
- Hints & Allegation: The World (In Poetry and Prose) (1994)
- Politics on Trial: Five Famous Trials of the 20th Century (2002)
- The Emerging Police State: Resisting Illegitimate Authority (2004)

== Pop culture references ==
- Kunstler was listed as Sister Mary Stigmata's attorney in Blues Brothers: Private in 1980.
- Robert Loggia portrayed Kunstler in the 1987 film Conspiracy: The Trial of the Chicago 8.
- Kunstler appeared as a lawyer for Jim Morrison in The Doors in 1991.
- Kunstler appeared as a judge in Malcolm X in 1992.
- Kunstler appeared as himself in the fifth season of Law & Order episode "White Rabbit" in 1994.
- Kunstler was portrayed by David Ackroyd in the 1994 television film Against the Wall.
- In the 1998 film The Big Lebowski, Jeff "The Dude" Lebowski demands representation by Kunstler or Ron Kuby during the Malibu Police Station scene.
- Kunstler was voiced by Liev Schreiber in the 2007 animated documentary Chicago 10.
- According to Lionel Shriver, the character of Joel Litvinoff in Zoë Heller's 2008 novel The Believers may be modeled on Kunstler.
- Gary Cole portrayed Kunstler in the 2010 film The Chicago 8.
- In Bryce Zabel's alternate history novel Surrounded By Enemies: What If Kennedy Survived Dallas?, Kunstler is initially Lee Harvey Oswald's defense attorney before resigning and being replaced by F. Lee Bailey.
- Kunstler was portrayed by Sir Mark Rylance in Aaron Sorkin's 2020 film The Trial of the Chicago 7.
