= List of films at the 2009 Sundance Film Festival =

The following films are to be shown at the 2009 Sundance Film Festival.

== Documentary Competition ==
- Art & Copy
- Boy Interrupted
- The Cove
- Crude
- Dirt! The Movie
- El General
- Good Hair
- Over the Hills and Far Away
- The Reckoning
- Reporter
- The September Issue
- Sergio
- Shouting Fire: Stories from the Edge of Free Speech
- We Live in Public
- When You're Strange
- William Kunstler: Disturbing the Universe

== U.S. Dramatic Competition ==
- Adam
- Amreeka
- Arlen Faber
- Big Fan
- Brief Interviews with Hideous Men
- Cold Souls
- Dare
- Don't Let Me Drown
- The Greatest
- Humpday
- Paper Heart
- Peter and Vandy
- Precious
- Sin Nombre
- Taking Chance
- Toe to Toe

== World Cinema Documentary ==
- 211:Anna
- Afghan Star
- Big River Man
- Burma VJ
- The End of the Line
- The Glass House
- Kimjongilia
- Let's Make Money
- Nollywood Babylon
- Old Partner
- Prom Night in Mississippi
- The Queen and I
- Quest for Honor
- Rough Aunties
- Thriller in Manila
- Tibet in Song

== World Cinema Dramatic Competition ==
- Before Tomorrow (Le Jour avant le lendemain) — Marie-Hélène Cousineau, Madeline Ivalu (Canada)
- Bronson
- Carmo, Hit the Road
- The Clone Returns Home (Kuron Wa Kokyo-Wo Mezasu)
- Dada's Dance
- An Education
- Lost Village
- Five Minutes of Heaven
- A French Gigolo (Cliente)
- Heart of Time (Corazon Del Tiempo)
- Louise-Michel
- from within
- Lulu and Jim (Lulu und Jimi)
- The Maid (La Nana)
- One Day in a Life (Un Altro Pianeta)
- Unmade Beds
- Victoria Day — David Bezmozgis (Canada)
- Zion and His Brother

== Premieres ==
- Adventureland
- Brooklyn's Finest
- Earth Days
- Endgame
- 500 Days of Summer
- I Love You Phillip Morris
- The Informers
- In the Loop
- Manure
- Mary and Max
- The Messenger
- Moon
- Motherhood
- Mystery Team
- Peter and Vandy
- Rudo y Cursi
- Shrink
- Spread
- The Winning Season
- Zion and His Brother

== Spectrum ==
- Against the Current
- The Anarchist's Wife
- Barking Water
- Children of Invention
- Everything Strange and New
- Helen
- The Immaculate Conception of Little Dizzle
- Johnny Mad Dog
- La Mission
- Lymelife
- The Missing Person
- Once More With Feeling
- The Only Good Indian
- Pomegranates and Myrrh
- The Vicious Kind
- World's Greatest Dad

== Documentary Spotlight ==
- It Might Get Loud
- No Impact Man
- Passing Strange
- Tyson
- Why We Laugh: Black Comedians on Black Comedy
- Wounded Knee
- The Yes Men Fix the World

== Park City at Midnight ==
- Black Dynamite
- The Carter
- Dead Snow
- Grace
- The Killing Room
- Mystery Team
- Spring Breakdown
- White Lightnin'

== Frontier ==
- Artist Spotlight: The Works of Maria Marshall
- Lunch Break/Exit
- O'er the Land
- Stay the Same Never Change
- Stingray Sam
- Where Is Where?
- You Won't Miss Me
