= 2009 Sundance Film Festival =

2009 film festival edition

- Festival poster
- Location: Park City, Salt Lake City, Ogden, and Sundance, Utah
- Hosted by: Sundance Institute
- Festival date: January 15–25, 2009
- Language: English
- Website: sundance.org/festival
- 2010 Sundance Film Festival 2008 Sundance Film Festival

The 2009 Sundance Film Festival was held during January 15, 2009 until January 25 in Park City, Utah. It was the 25th iteration of the Sundance Film Festival.

== Awards ==
- Grand Jury Prize: Documentary - We Live in Public
- Grand Jury Prize: Dramatic - Precious: Based on the Novel "Push" by Sapphire
- Grand Jury Prize: World Cinema Dramatic - The Maid
- Grand Jury Prize: World Cinema Documentary - Rough Aunties
- Audience Award: Documentary - The Cove
- Audience Award: Dramatic - Precious: Based on the Novel "Push" by Sapphire
- World Cinema Audience Award: Documentary - Afghan Star
- World Cinema Audience Award: Dramatic - An Education
- Documentary Directing Award - Natalia Almada for El General
- Dramatic Directing Award - Cary Joji Fukunaga for Sin Nombre
- World Cinema Directing Award: Dramatic - Oliver Hirschbiegel for Five Minutes of Heaven
- World Cinema Directing Award: Documentary - Havana Marking for Afghan Star
- Excellence in Cinematography Award: Documentary - Bob Richman for The September Issue
- Excellence in Cinematography Award: Dramatic - Adriano Goldman for Sin Nombre
- World Cinema Cinematography Award: Dramatic - John De Borman for An Education
- World Cinema Cinematography Award: Documentary - John Maringouin for Big River Man
- Documentary Film Editing - Karen Schmeer for Sergio
- World Cinema Documentary Editing Award - Janus Billeskov Jansen and Thomas Papapetros for Burma VJ
- Waldo Salt Screenwriting Award: Dramatic - Nicholas Jasenovec and Charlyne Yi for Paper Heart
- World Cinema Screenwriting Award - Guy Hibbert for Five Minutes of Heaven
- Special Jury Prize for Originality, World Cinema Drama - Louise-Michel
- Special Jury Prize, World Cinema Documentary - Tibet in Song
- Special Jury Prize for Acting, World Cinema - Catalina Saavedra for The Maid (La Nana)
- Special Jury Prize, U.S. Documentary - Good Hair
- Special Jury Prize for Spirit of Independence - Humpday
- Special Jury Prize for Acting - Mo'Nique for Precious: Based on the Novel "Push" by Sapphire
- Jury Prize, U.S. Short Filmmaking - Short Term 12
- Jury Prize, International Short Filmmaking - Lies
- 2009 Alfred P. Sloan Prize - Adam

== Jurors ==
Dramatic Jury

- Virginia Madsen – (Actress: Sideways, Number 23, The Rainmaker, David Lynch's Dune)
- Scott McGehee – (Producer/Director/Writer: Uncertainty, The Deep End, Suture)
- Maud Nadler – (Producer/HBO Films: Relative Values)
- Mike White – (Writer/Director/Producer: Year Of The Dog)
- Boaz Yakin – (Director/Writer/Producer: Fresh, Remember The Titans, Hostel)

Documentary Jury

- Patrick Creadon – (Writer/Director/Director of Photography: Wordplay, Writer/Director/Director of Photography: I.O.U.S.A.)
- Carl Deal – (Director/Producer: Trouble The Water)
- Andrea Meditch – (Executive Producer/Producer: Man on Wire, In The Shadow Of The Moon)
- Sam Pollard – (Editor: When The Levees Broke, Jungle Fever, Mo' Better Blues)
- Marina Zenovich – (Director/Producer/Writer: Roman Polanski: Wanted and Desired)

World Dramatic Jury

- Colin Brown (New York) – (Editor: Screen International)
- Christine Jeffs (New Zealand) – (Director/Writer: Rain, Stroke; Director: Sunshine Cleaning)
- Vibeke Windelov (Denmark) – (Producer: Dogville, Breaking The Waves, Dancer In The Dark)

World Documentary Jury

- Gillian Armstrong (Australia) – (Director: Death Defying Acts, Oscar & Lucinda, Little Women)
- Thom Powers (New York) – (Documentary Programmer, Toronto International Film Festival)
- Hubert Sauper (France) – (Director/Producer: Darwin's Nightmare)

Shorts Jury

- Gerardo Naranjo – (Director/Writer/Producer: "I’m Gonna Explode" (Spanish: Voy a explotar), Malachance, Perro Negro)
- Lou Taylor Pucci – (Actor: Thumbsucker)
- Sharon Swart – (Reporter: Variety)

Alfred P. Sloan Jury (Award presented to the writer and director of an outstanding feature film focusing on science or technology as a theme, or depicting a scientist, engineer, or mathematician as a major character)

- Fran Bagenal – (Professor of Astrophysical & Planetary Sciences, University of Colorado)
- Rodney Brooks – (Panasonic Professor of Robotics, MIT Computer Science & AI Lab)
- Ray Gesteland – (Department of Human Genetics, University of Utah)
- Jeffrey Nachmanoff – (Writer: The Day After Tomorrow; Writer/Director: Traitor)
- Alex Rivera – (Director/Writer/Editor: Sleep Dealer)

== See also ==
- List of films at the 2009 Sundance Film Festival
