= The Believers (novel) =

2008 novel by Zoë Heller

- The cover of the first edition
- Author: Zoë Heller
- Cover artist: gray318
- Language: English
- Publisher: Fig Tree, an imprint of Penguin Books
- Publication date: September 2008
- Publication place: United Kingdom
- Media type: Print (Hardback)
- Pages: 306 pp.
- ISBN: 978-0-670-91612-2 (hardback), ISBN 978-0-670-91613-9 (trade paperback)
- OCLC: 230916788

The Believers is a 2008 novel by Zoë Heller. It depicts the family of a controversial lawyer in New York after a stroke renders him comatose. Each member of the Litvinoff family must confront the hypocrisies underlying their patriarch's political profile, and make difficult choices about their own values and ideological commitments.

The motto of the book—"The challenge of modernity is to live without illusions and without becoming disillusioned"—is a quotation from Antonio Gramsci. It has been noted that The Believers, Heller's third novel, bears no resemblance to her previous book, the successful Notes on a Scandal (2003).

== Plot summary ==
At a party in 1962, 18-year-old typist Audrey Howard meets Joel Litvinoff, an American lawyer involved with the civil rights movement. Although Joel is fourteen years older, Audrey is impressed when Joel puts her pompous date in his place. In turn, Joel is intrigued by Audrey's aloofness. Joel later finds Audrey's number in a telephone book and insists on accompanying Audrey to visit her dreary, rural parents the next day. Audrey and Joel spend the night together, and Joel half-seriously suggests that Audrey marry him and follow him to the United States. Bored with her unstimulating life in Britain, Audrey takes him up on his offer.

Forty years later, Joel and Audrey live together in Greenwich Village. Joel is now famous, successful, and controversial for his radical legal activism. Audrey has become a fiery, antagonistic woman who finds fault in all things and defends her husband's causes with zealous conviction. Joel and Audrey have three adult children living elsewhere in New York City. Lenny, the eldest, was adopted at age seven as part of Joel's belief in collective, "tribal" child-rearing. Lenny's parents were eco-terrorists, with their last campaign killing his biological father and landing his biological mother in jail. Since then, Joel has grown frustrated with Lenny's addiction issues and repeated petty crimes, while Audrey dotes on Lenny and constantly excuses his delinquency. Karla, the middle child, is a hospital social worker. Karla struggles with low self-esteem after years of demeaning treatment from her family about her weight and intelligence. Karla is unhappily married to Mike, a union organizer, who desperately wants children. Rosa, the youngest, chaperones an after-school program for underprivileged girls. Once a firm socialist, Rosa tried to join the socialist revolution in Cuba but returned disillusioned after four years of witnessing Fidel Castro's oppression. However, by the time she is introduced, Rosa has had a positive experience in a synagogue and discovered an interest in Orthodox Judaism.

While defending an Arab American man against terrorism charges in the wake of the September 11 attacks, Joel has a stroke and enters a coma. At the hospital, Audrey lashes out at the doctors, causing a fight with Rosa that ends with Audrey kicking Rosa from the hospital. Audrey's long-suffering confidant, Jean, tries to help distract her by taking her to activist social functions, but Audrey is offended at the activists' lack of concern for Joel and preoccupation with public figures. Audrey receives a letter from a woman named Berenice Mason, who claims to be Joel's lover and the mother of his illegitimate child. Audrey dismisses the claim.

Rosa spends a weekend with an Orthodox rabbi's family in Monsey. Rosa is at first put off by the family's insularity, but is intrigued by the rabbi's willingness to discuss his faith rationally with her. Later, Rosa witnesses a girl's mother strike her child during a parent-teacher conference, and confides in her fellow chaperone Raphael that she believes they cannot help the girls escape their lower-class neighbourhoods.

Karla attempts to help her melancholic neighbour, Ms. Mee, write a letter against Ms. Mee's employer, who is taking all her tips. At work, Karla is saved from an aggressive patient by Khaled, the man who runs the newspaper stand outside the hospital. Karla is surprised by Khaled's genuine kindness, enjoyment of simple pleasures, and lack of concern for politics and appearances - so unlike her parents.

Berenice confronts Audrey at her home, but Audrey sends her away in anger. After Joel's former staff and Jean confront her with proof that Berenice is telling the truth, she agrees to meet with Berenice. Jean warns her to wait until she is ready, but Audrey presses ahead, and the meeting goes poorly. Andrey angrily refuses Berenice's request for their children to have a relationship. Halfway through her tirade, she realizes everyone in the room is afraid of her and loses her energy. She agrees to pay Joel's child support in his stead on the condition that Berenice immediately leave and avoid further contact with her or her three children. Afterwards, Jean watches Audrey cry for the first time.

The Litvinoff family gathers for Audrey's birthday. Mike argues with Audrey over his union's decision to support a Republican governor, and both of them mock Rosa for entertaining Orthodox faith. Lenny's girlfriend Tanya obliviously tries to join the conversation as Audrey mocks her too. Lenny goes to the bathroom, but stays inside so long that Rosa becomes concerned. The family knocks down the bathroom door to find him in a drug-induced stupor. Audrey and Tanya treat the overdose as an excusable mistake, horrifying Rosa and causing her to leave.

Rosa attends lessons on religion at her local Jewish community centre. The experience makes her feel conflicted. She instinctively dislikes the blind obedience of the Orthodox women and their insistence that her skepticism towards misogynistic religious rules is something to be overcome, but also wonders if her skepticism is human weakness holding her back from supernatural truth. Rosa also realizes that her international, upper-class upbringing has alienated her from the sensibilities and concerns of average suburban Americans, like her roommate. Rosa feels guilty for looking down on "normal" girls, at least until she finds her roommate cheating on her fiance with Lenny. Back at work, Rosa vetoes a dance routine at the after-school program for being too explicit, and Raphael and the girls make fun of her prudishness and suggest it is because she is Jewish.

Audrey takes Lenny to visit his biological mother, Susan, in prison. She is jealous of Lenny's natural love for Susan, especially since she finds Susan unrefined. Audrey despairs that Lenny does not return her love so freely. Jean encourages Audrey to cut Lenny off unless he takes serious action to deal with his addiction issues. Jean even suggests that she take Lenny with her to work on a farm by her vacation home in another state. Audrey refuses at first, but eventually agrees with Jean. Lenny at first reacts angrily, but when Audrey stands her ground, he gives in.

Mike decides that he and Karla have tried for children naturally long enough, and moves to adopt. During the pre-adoption courses, Karla is embarrassed at her inability to express sincere desire for children, whereas Mike's answers flow readily. Meanwhile, she continues to spend time with Khaled at work, and their relationship evolves into a sexual affair. Karla questions how Khaled can care nothing for politics despite the systemic injustices against Arabs in America and the important accomplishments of past activists. Khaled replies that America is better than the Middle East and that politics are boring and pointless. Karla decides what they are doing is wrong and ends the affair.

Audrey visits Joel with Karla and Rosa. She is approached by Joel's doctors, who inform her that now would be the appropriate time to turn off Joel's life-sustaining equipment. Audrey is furious and does not give her consent, accusing the doctors of opportunism and malpractice. At the same time she realizes her hypocrisy, as she and Joel had mutually agreed to pull the plug if one of them became unable care for themselves and scorned the pro-life lobby. Berenice accidentally visits at the same time and Audrey causes a scene.

Rosa attends excursions to various Jewish sites with her classmates, but when a classmate suggests that Rosa's hesitations are rooted in being uncomfortable with her womanhood, Rosa becomes angry and disavows the religion lessons. She sets up a one-night stand with a college acquaintance, Chris, to prove to herself that she is done with Orthodox rules. Afterwards, she decides that she still feels a connection to Orthodox Judaism, and decides to continue visiting Monsey.

When the after-school program girls perform the dance she vetoed at a public event, Rosa leaves without congratulating them. When Raphael confronts her, she repeats that their work is futile and she cannot stand to watch the girls meet their class destiny. Raphael angrily tells her that the girls deserve better than someone who sees them as lost causes, and Rosa realizes that he is correct and takes steps to quit.

When Audrey visits Lenny in the countryside, he is doing well. He has positive relationships with his Alcoholic Anonymous sponsor, works hard on the farm, and has cut ties with Tanya and his addict friends in New York City. Audrey reacts skeptically and sourly, but Jean bluntly tells her that Audrey must be afraid Lenny will leave her if he does not have to depend on her. Audrey confides in Jean that she believes Joel never loved her. Audrey acknowledges out loud for the first time that she accepted continuous infidelity from Joel, but she can tell Joel saw Berenice as more than a sexual fling, and that he loved Berenice in a way that he had never loved her.

Rosa and Karla decide to visit Berenice. Berenice tells the girls that Joel got her the apartment illegally through connections. She shows them photographs of her genitals and books on the occult, and asks them to have a relationship with their half-sibling even if it has to be kept secret from Audrey. Rosa expresses anger to Karla after they leave, upset that Berenice would ask them to conspire against their mother. Rosa also condemns their father for giving Berenice love that was meant for them, and for compromising his principles for a kooky artist. Karla, however, personally understands that Joel would have had less energy to love his children had he limited himself to an unsatisfying marriage. She reflects on the perpetual unhappiness of her neighbour Ms. Mee, and wonders if she and Mike will also come to define their lives by mundane unhappiness.

Rosa takes the after-school program girls on one last excursion to a rally held by [Susan Sarandon] against the Iraq War. Audrey and Jean show up to assist her. While Jean fetches candies and souvenirs for the girls, Rosa speaks with her mother about Judaism. She tells Audrey that she now supports the right of the Israeli state to defend itself, to Audrey's disgust. Rosa asks Audrey what she would do if the truth struck her undeniably and inexplicably, even if she could not make sense of it and it contradicted everything she was raised to believe. Audrey bitterly replies that this would never happen, and if it did she would reject it.

Eventually, Joel contracts an infection. The doctors tell the family that they need to come urgently. Mike is upset because the infection came on the same day as the election campaign he had run for his union, and he wanted to see the results. Karla is disturbed that Mike seems to view Joel's passing as both an irritation and an exciting source of drama. At the hospital, Audrey, Lenny, Karla, Mike, Rosa, and Joel's mother visit him for the last time. Joel's mother gives him a brief and definitive goodbye, then asks to leave. Mike focuses on the election results until his candidate is declared the winner, then shows a tabloid article to Audrey about rumors regarding an affair by Joel. Karla sternly asks her husband to leave, to his displeasure. Rosa reflects on all the times she chastised her father for compromising his values for small comforts, and regrets that she wasted time trying to call out his hypocrisy instead of enjoying his company. In the hallway, Audrey surprises Karla by telling her that she does not have to stay with Mike if she is unhappy. Joel dies while they are speaking. The children silently join Audrey as she weeps over Joel's corpse, then leave one by one to let Audrey be with their father.

Joel's funeral is held in a cathedral almost immediately after his death. Audrey's sister and brother-in-law accompany Jean to the ceremony. They are struck by the wide variety of mourners in the crowd. Audrey delivers a eulogy from the pulpit. She speaks of Joel as a principled defender of civil rights and social progress. To everyone's surprise, she unexpectedly calls Berenice to join her from among the crowd of mourners, along with Berenice's son Jamil. Audrey declares that Berenice and Jamil are a testament to Joel's commitment to collective tribal child-rearing and expanded families, and that she sees them as family too. She also announces a new scholarship for progressive causes in Joel's name. After the funeral, Jean approaches Audrey in shock, but Audrey rebuffs her questions. Jean realizes that Audrey gone back to coldly hiding her feelings to safeguard Joel's legacy as a man of principle.

Lenny attends the funeral reception with Tanya, apparently having relapsed. Rosa tells her mother of her plans to go to Jerusalem, and to study the Torah at a yeshiva. Mike looks for Karla, but cannot find her at the reception. Across town, Karla boards a subway and texts Khaled to let him know she will join him soon.

== Reviews ==
The Believers was published to almost unanimously positive reviews. It has been called a "cruelly clever new novel", "an observant and unsentimental family drama that pits rationalism against faith", "at heart an American novel: a larger, more considered, layered and utterly assured study of a family driven by political passion whose personal lives refuse to comply with prescribed ideology". Critics agree that it defies comparison with Notes on a Scandal and that it is rich in character development.

Reviewers and critics have suggested that Heller has a "penchant for unlikeable characters" which may be seen as interesting or annoying. Heller has retorted by stating that

it begins to seem like it's an issue with the books I write. [...] Quite often people say, "Ooh, what a monstrous character", and "Who is there to like in this book?" And I suppose my answer is twofold: one is that I don't think Audrey is monstrous through and through—I think she's funny, or certainly meant to be funny. And then there are all sorts of extenuating factors. I read a review the other day that said, "Joel is the one charming character in the book, and we're left with this pain in the neck." And in one sense that exactly expresses what she's had to deal with all her life, being the less desirable companion to this charming, charismatic, fabulous man, who is also this gigantic egotist. It's quite hard work living with that kind of star. [...] It's amazing how often, both giving readings in book shops or reading reviews on Amazon, or even reading supposedly sophisticated criticism, that charge arises: "You've written somebody that I don't like." And you want to say, well, how do you feel about Iago? I take umbrage at all that. [...] I very strongly feel that the job of fiction is not to write admirable figures, but to imagine one's way into all sorts of people, often people who ostensibly at least are deeply unlikeable or unpleasant. The question is not whether you like them but whether you understand them.

—

Lionel Shriver notes that the character of Joel Litvinoff may be modelled on William Kunstler.
