= Strel =

Strel is a surname. Notable people with the surname include:

- Boris Strel (1959–2013), Slovenian alpine skier
- Martin Strel (born 1954), Slovenian long-distance swimmer
- Janko Strel (1947–2022), a Slovenian politician
