= Spring Breakdown =

- DVD cover
- Directed by: Ryan Shiraki
- Written by: Ryan Shiraki; Rachel Dratch
- Produced by: Rick Berg; Larry Kennar
- Starring: Amy Poehler; Parker Posey; Rachel Dratch; Amber Tamblyn; Seth Meyers; Sophie Monk; Jonathan Sadowski; Missi Pyle; Jane Lynch
- Cinematography: Frank G. DeMarco
- Edited by: Tom Lewis
- Music by: Deborah Lurie
- Production company: Code Entertainment
- Distributed by: Warner Bros. Pictures (Note: Released under the Warner Premiere label.)
- Release dates: January 16, 2009 (Sundance); June 2, 2009 (United States)
- Running time: 84 minutes
- Country: United States
- Language: English
- Budget: $12 million

Spring Breakdown is a 2009 American comedy film directed by Ryan Shiraki and starring Amy Poehler, Parker Posey, and Rachel Dratch.

The movie was originally filmed in 2006 and was then sold to Warner Independent Pictures, where it sat on the shelf. The company was shut down by its parent in 2008, who decided to release the film direct-to-video in 2009, three years after principal photography.

== Plot ==
Gayle, Becky and Judi are performing in McCormick State College's Senior Talent Show in 1992. The three of them were the 'losers' and geeks in college but were always hopeful about their future. The next scene then jumps to 15 years later. Gayle is now a guide dog trainer for the visually handicapped. She asks her client out on a date but gets rejected after he touches her face. Becky is an office manager for Senator Hartmann. Judi and her fiance, William, go for relationship counseling and insist that there are no secrets between them. Becky returns home only to find her cat, Honey, dead. The three of them hold their usual 'make your own pizza party' and play their usual 'movie game'. They decide to go on a trip to Tempe, Arizona to the Wimmin's Music Festival.

Senator Hartmann announces to her team that she is the potential next vice president. In order to ensure success, she has to make sure that she has a good reputation and background. Her daughter Ashley’s boyfriend has recently broken up with her because she is not “slutty enough”. In order to win him back and not disappoint her mother, she decides that she will be going to South Padre for her spring break. She wants her to think that she is 'just like her mother was back in the days' - the most popular girl in her sorority and 'always up for a good time'. In order to make sure that Ashley does not act out, Senator Hartmann sends Becky to go to South Padre to keep an eye on her. Throughout the trip, Gayle becomes very close to a group of girls called The Sevens who are Ashley's nemesis.

Judi returns home and discovers that William is actually gay and he ends up breaking off with her. Judi meets up with Becky and Gayle and the three of them decide to go to South Padre to relive the college days that they never had. Even though the girls are appalled with the state of the place, Gayle and Judi fit into the crowd easily. They spend the next few days getting wasted while Becky keeps to the main reason of her being there. Gayle and Judi eventually persuade Becky into relaxing.

One night at a foam party, Ashley finds out that Becky was actually sent by her mother and feels betrayed because she thought they were friends. They engage in a cat fight and end up in jail. That night, William goes to find Judi and asks for a second chance. Then Judi bails Becky and Ashley out of jail. She announces to everyone that she is going to marry William. Gayle declares that she's going to be in the All Girl Talent Show with The Sevens because she is finally going to win. This leads to an argument, and Judi leaves to get married, while Becky and Gayle prepare separately for the talent contest.

At the airport, Judi finally admits to herself that William is gay and tells him she can't marry him. Gayle falls out with Mason, the leader of The Sevens, just before they go on stage. Senator Hartmann appears backstage and wants to bring Ashley back home by force. They have a confrontation and Ashley begs her mother to let her compete in the show, and her mother relents. As the group begins to perform, the pianist passes out (drunk) and Judi returns just in time to replace her. They perform, with begrudged success. The film ends with the three of them back home, at their usual 'make your own pizza party' playing their usual 'movie game'.

== Cast ==
- Amy Poehler as Gayle O'Brien
- Parker Posey as Becky St. Germaine
- Rachel Dratch as Judi Joskow (now Cody)
- Amber Tamblyn as Ashley Hartmann
- Seth Meyers as William Rushfield
- Sophie Monk as Mason Masters
- Jonathan Sadowski as Doug
- Missi Pyle as Charlene
- Jane Lynch as Senator "Kay Bee" Hartmann
- Mae Whitman as Lydia
- Sarah Hagan as Truvy
- Jana Kramer as Seven #2
- Kristin Cavallari as Seven #3
- Justin Hartley as Todd
- Loretta Devine as Counselor

== Production and release ==
The script was developed by Rachel Dratch and Ryan Shiraki, who were colleagues on Saturday Night Live. Spring Breakdown was filmed in 2006 and was initially created by Rogue Pictures as an "R-rated spring-break farce"; it was then sold to Warner Independent Pictures as a PG-13 film and underwent a long post-production period. The Los Angeles Times described the film’s post-production:

“Spring Breakdown” might be a case study of recession-era managed expectations and the sometimes-uneasy alliance between independent auteurs and bottom-line-fixated studios. The script about three women attempting a college “do-over” -- which might be neatly described as “Where the Boys Are” meets “Revenge of the Nerds”…endured a long post-production period, and then sat on the shelf awaiting release.

The score to Spring Breakdown was composed by Deborah Lurie who recorded her score with the Hollywood Studio Symphony conducted by Blake Neely and recorded by Greg Dennen at the Eastwood Scoring Stage at Warner Brothers.

In April 2008, co-star Missi Pyle believed the box-office performance of Baby Mama would determine whether Warner Bros. released this film theatrically.

The film was screened at the Sundance Film Festival in January 2009 as part of Park City at Midnight before going direct-to-video.

== Reception ==
On the review aggregator website Rotten Tomatoes, 50% of 12 critics' reviews are positive, with an average rating of 5.8/10.

Variety magazine called the film "energetic but uninspired" with a "party-boatload of comedic talent [that] is fairly wasted" and notes:

There are funny lines scattered about, and the pacey pic has an aptly cheesy look dominated by the neon hues of tropical drinks and thong wear. But the situations offer no real satiric finesse on familiar genre tropes — wet T-shirt contest, drunken puke-outs, a climactic talent show triumph — and the rote girl-power message rings unironically hollow.

Ray Greene of Boxoffice magazine, after seeing the film at Sundance, gave the film no stars, saying "The annual Sundance “What the f---” moment has arrived in the form of Spring Breakdown, a very bad genre exercise starring some very good comedic actresses." Bitch Media said "certain performances and small moments", particularly those of Jane Lynch and Missi Pyle, are what save the film.
