= Who We Are: A Chronicle of Racism in America =

- Poster
- Directed by: Emily Kunstler; Sarah Kunstler
- Written by: Jeffery Robinson
- Produced by: Emily Kunstler; Sarah Kunstler; Jeffery Robinson; Gbenga Akinnagbe; Vanessa Hope; Susan Korda; Katharine Nephew; Jayashri Wyatt; Andrea Crabtree+Keller
- Starring: Jeffery Robinson
- Cinematography: Jesse Wakeman
- Edited by: Emily Kunstler
- Music by: Kathryn Bostic
- Distributed by: Sony Pictures Classics
- Release date: March 2021 (South by Southwest)
- Running time: 118 minutes
- Country: United States
- Language: English

Who We Are: A Chronicle of Racism in America is a 2021 American documentary film written by Jeffery Robinson and directed by Emily Kunstler and Sarah Kunstler.

== Participants ==
- Jeffery Robinson
- Chief Egunwale F. Amusan
- Mother Lessie Benningfield Randle
- Josephine Bolling McCall
- Gwen Carr
- Ista Clark
- Tiffany Crutcher
- Kathie Fox
- Darren Martin
- Al Miller
- Richard “Dick” Opians
- Robert “Opie” Orians
- Carolyn Payne
- Larry Robinson
- Henry “Hank” Sanders
- Tami Sawyer
- Faya Ora Rose Touré
- Braxton Spivey
- Stacey Toussaint
- Robert Turner
- Kristi Williams

== Release ==
The film premiered at South by Southwest in March 2021, and was released theatrically on January 14, 2022.

== Reception ==
The film has a 98% rating on Rotten Tomatoes based on 51 reviews. Matt Fagerholm of RogerEbert.com awarded the film four stars. Bradley Gibson of Film Threat awarded the film a 10 out of 10.

Peter Debruge of Variety gave the film a positive review, calling it "an engaging and essential essay film that makes its points clearly, backed by evidence, for those open-minded enough to consider their education incomplete."

Jocelyn Noveck of the Associated Press also gave the film a positive review and wrote, "No matter how much you think you already know, you’re bound to learn new things from Who We Are, directed by Emily and Sarah Kunstler. And to be stunned, at some point."

Inkoo Kang of The Hollywood Reporter also gave the film a positive review and wrote, "Frequently moving, but never transcends its lecture format."

== Accolades ==
The film won the Audience Award in the Documentary Spotlight Category at the South by Southwest Film Festival.
