= Florida Film Critics Circle Awards 2006 =

Annual US film awards ceremony

11th FFCC Awards

December 22, 2006

Best Film:
The Departed

The 11th Florida Film Critics Circle Awards were given by the Florida Film Critics Circle on December 22, 2006.

The Departed from director Martin Scorsese received 4 awards, including Best Picture, Director and Supporting Actor (Jack Nicholson). The awards for best lead acting went to Whitaker (The Last King of Scotland) and Mirren (The Queen).

== Winners ==
- Best Actor:
  - Forest Whitaker - The Last King of Scotland
- Best Actress:
  - Helen Mirren - The Queen
- Best Animated Film:
  - Monster House
- Best Cinematography:
  - Pan's Labyrinth (El laberinto del fauno) - Guillermo Navarro
- Best Director:
  - Martin Scorsese - The Departed
- Best Documentary Film:
  - An Inconvenient Truth
- Best Film:
  - The Departed
- Best Foreign Language Film:
  - Pan's Labyrinth (El laberinto del fauno) • Mexico/Spain/United States
- Best Screenplay:
  - William Monahan - The Departed
- Best Supporting Actor:
  - Jack Nicholson - The Departed
- Best Supporting Actress:
  - Cate Blanchett - Notes on a Scandal
- Pauline Kael Breakout Award:
  - Jennifer Hudson - Dreamgirls
- Golden Orange for Outstanding Contribution to Film:
  - Billy Corben and Alfred Spellman
