= William Kunstler: Disturbing the Universe =

2009 documentary film

- Directed by: Emily Kunstler; Sarah Kunstler
- Written by: Sarah Kunstler
- Produced by: Emily Kunstler; Sarah Kunstler; Jesse Moss; Susi Korda; Vanessa Hope
- Cinematography: Brett Wiley; Martina Radwan
- Edited by: Emily Kunstler
- Music by: Shahzad Ismaily
- Distributed by: Arthouse Films
- Release date: 2009
- Country: United States
- Language: English

William Kunstler: Disturbing the Universe is a documentary film about the late American civil rights attorney William Kunstler directed by daughters Emily Kunstler and Sarah Kunstler that premiered at the 25th Sundance Film Festival in January 2009.

William Kunstler was a famous 20th-century lawyer whose clients included Martin Luther King Jr., the Chicago Seven, Larry Davis, Malcolm X, Phillip and Daniel Berrigan, Abbie Hoffman, H. Rap Brown, Stokely Carmichael, Adam Clayton Powell Jr., Filiberto Ojeda Ríos and Leonard Peltier. The New York Times called him "the most hated and most loved lawyer in America". Kunstler served as the negotiator for inmates at the prison uprising at Attica State Prison in New York in 1971.

This film is a co-production of the Independent Television Service (ITVS) and was broadcast on the PBS television series P.O.V. in June 2010. The film was an official selection of the 2009 Sundance Film Festival. It also received a 2008 grant from the Foundation for Jewish Culture's Lynn and Jules Kroll Fund for Jewish Documentary Film. Arthouse Films released the film theatrically in North America in 2009.

== Reception ==
The film has generally received favorable reviews from critics. The review aggregator Rotten Tomatoes reported that 79% of critics gave the film a positive review, based on 28 reviews.

Stephen Holden of The New York Times described the film as a "refresher course on the history of American left-wing politics in the 1960s and '70s as well as an affectionate personal biography of Kunstler."

In 2009, the film was nominated for the Documentary Grand Jury Prize at the Sundance Film Festival.

In 2010, the film was among 15 films shortlisted for an Academy Awards for Best Documentary Feature for the 83rd Academy Awards.

== Articles ==
- IFC.com: Disturbing the Universe with Michael Moore
- Review in Arts of War on the Web, Dec. 9, 2009
- Feature about Emily and Sarah Kunstler and William Kunstler: Disturbing the Universe in The New York Times
- Feature about Emily and Sarah Kunstler and William Kunstler: Disturbing the Universe in the Los Angeles Times
- Article written by Emily and Sarah Kunstler in The Huffington Post
- Interview with Emily and Sarah Kunstler in indieWIRE
- Interview with Emily and Sarah Kunstler in Gothamist
- Review by Alec Baldwin in The Huffington Post
- Review in San Francisco's BeyondChron
- Review on Hamptons.com
- Review in the Missoula Independent
- Review in the NYC Independent
- Review in The Hollywood Reporter
- Review from Le Monde
- Review on écrans.fr
- indieWire reports of sale of Kunstler movie to Arthouse Films
- indieWire interviews Emily and Sarah Kunstler
- Review in The Indypendent
- Roundtable interview of Sarah and Emily Kunstler, Margaret Ratner Kunstler, Michael Ratner, and Yusef Salaam, in Revolution
- Review in The Stranger
- Review in Variety
- Full Frame Award Winners Press Release
- Traverse City Award Winners Press Release
