= Notes on a Scandal (film) =

2006 film by Richard Eyre

- Promotional movie poster
- Directed by: Richard Eyre
- Screenplay by: Patrick Marber
- Based on: Notes on a Scandal by Zoë Heller
- Produced by: Robert Fox; Scott Rudin
- Starring: Judi Dench; Cate Blanchett; Bill Nighy
- Cinematography: Chris Menges
- Edited by: John Bloom; Antonia Van Drimmelen
- Music by: Philip Glass
- Production companies: Fox Searchlight Pictures; DNA Films; UK Film Council; BBC Films; Scott Rudin Productions
- Distributed by: Fox Searchlight Pictures
- Release date: 25 December 2006
- Running time: 91 minutes
- Countries: United Kingdom; United States
- Language: English
- Budget: $15 million
- Box office: $50.6 million

Notes on a Scandal is a 2006 British psychological drama thriller directed by Richard Eyre and produced by Robert Fox and Scott Rudin. Adapted from the 2003 novel by Zoë Heller, the screenplay was written by Patrick Marber. The film stars Judi Dench, Cate Blanchett, and Bill Nighy, and centres on a lonely veteran teacher who uncovers a fellow teacher's illicit affair with an underage student.

Notes on a Scandal had its limited theatrical release on 25 December 2006, then went into a wide release on 26 January 2007. The film received positive reviews from critics, with Dench and Blanchett's performances receiving widespread critical acclaim and Marber's screenplay being particularly lauded. The film also emerged as a major commercial success at the box-office, grossing $50.6 million worldwide.

Notes on a Scandal earned Dench and Blanchett nominations for Best Actress and Best Supporting Actress respectively at various ceremonies including the Academy Awards (Oscars), the Critics' Choice Awards, the Golden Globe Awards, Screen Actors Guild Awards; and a BAFTA Award nomination (for Dench alone). Marber's adapted screenplay also received nominations from the BAFTAs, Golden Globes, and Oscars—the latter of whom additionally nominated Philip Glass's score.

== Plot ==
Barbara Covett is a history teacher at a comprehensive school in London. She is unpopular with the students and her fellow teachers, for whom she has contempt. Having never married and nearing retirement, her only comfort is her diary. When a new art teacher, Sheba Hart, joins the staff, Barbara is immediately attracted to her and they strike up a friendship. In Barbara, this friendship quickly turns into infatuation and obsession. Sheba is married to the much older Richard, and is just re-entering the work force after devoting herself to her special needs son.

Barbara later witnesses Sheba in a sexual encounter with a 15-year-old student named Steven Connolly at the school. When Barbara confronts her, Sheba recounts all the details of her involvement with the boy, but asks Barbara not to tell the school administration until after Christmas, as she wants to be with her family. Barbara claims she has no intention of reporting her, providing Sheba ends the relationship immediately, but Barbara secretly plans to use the affair as a means of manipulating Sheba. Over the Christmas break, Barbara visits her sister, who asks her about another young teacher Barbara befriended. Barbara stiffly says that the young teacher moved away. Barbara's sister asks if she has any other female "friends", strongly implying Barbara is a lesbian; Barbara insists she has no idea what her sister is talking about.

Sheba tells Steven that the affair is over, yet finds herself unable to stop seeing him. However, when she refuses to give in to Barbara's increasing demands on her time and attention, Barbara reveals the secret to a male teacher who has told her that he is attracted to Sheba. The teacher informs the student's parents and the school. After the affair becomes public, the headmaster accuses Barbara of knowing about the affair and not notifying the authorities. He also learns that a former teacher at the school, the young woman Barbara mentioned at Christmas, had taken out a restraining order against Barbara for stalking her and her fiancé. Sheba is fired and Barbara is forced into early retirement by the headmaster.

Sheba's husband asks her to move out of their home, so she moves into Barbara's house, unaware that Barbara is the reason she was found out and believing the affair became known because Steven confessed it to his mother. When Sheba discovers Barbara's diary and learns it was Barbara who leaked the story of the affair, she confronts Barbara and strikes her in anger. A row ensues, and Sheba runs outside to a crowd of reporters and photographers. When she becomes hemmed in by them, Barbara rescues her.

Sheba's emotions spent, she quietly tells Barbara that she had initiated the friendship with her because she liked her and that they could have been friends. Barbara says, "I need more than a friend." Sheba leaves Barbara, placing the journal on the table as a mute reminder that she had kept its contents secret, and returns to her husband. Sheba is subsequently sentenced to 10 months in prison; however, it is strongly implied she is reconciled with her family.

Later, Barbara meets another younger woman who is reading a newspaper article about the Sheba Hart affair. Barbara says she was acquainted with Sheba but says they hardly knew each other. Barbara introduces herself, invites the other woman to a concert, and the pair continue to talk.

== Cast ==
- Judi Dench as Barbara Covett
- Cate Blanchett as Sheba Hart
- Bill Nighy as Richard Hart
- Andrew Simpson as Steven Connolly
- Tom Georgeson as Ted Mawson
- Michael Maloney as Sandy Pabblem
- Joanna Scanlan as Sue Hodge
- Shaun Parkes as Bill Rumer
- Emma Williams as Linda
- Phil Davis as Brian Bangs
- Juno Temple as Polly Hart
- Max Lewis as Ben Hart
- Anne-Marie Duff as Annabel
- Julia McKenzie as Marjorie

== Production ==
Filming took place in August and September 2005. The film was shot mainly on location in the Parliament Hill, Gospel Oak and Camden Town areas of northwest London. The Arts and Media School, Islington was used a film location for many of the school scenes.

== Reception ==
=== Critical reaction ===
Notes on a Scandal opened to positive reviews, with Blanchett and Dench receiving widespread critical acclaim for their performances. On review aggregator Rotten Tomatoes, it holds an approval rating of 87% based on 174 reviews, and an average rating of 7.6/10. The website's critical consensus states, "In this sharp psychological thriller, Judi Dench and Cate Blanchett give fierce, memorable performances as two schoolteachers locked in a battle of wits." Metacritic assigned the film a weighted average score of 73 out of 100, based on 35 critics, indicating "generally favorable reviews".

The Guardian called the film a "delectable adaptation" with "tremendous acting from Judi Dench and Cate Blanchett, with many blue-chip supporting contributions" and a "screenwriting masterclass from Patrick Marber". The Times praised the film, saying: "Notes on a Scandal, is screenwriting at its vicious best ... Richard Eyre directs the film like a chamber play. He leans on Philip Glass's ever-present and insistent music like a crutch. But his natural gift for framing scenes is terrifically assured. A potent and evil pleasure."

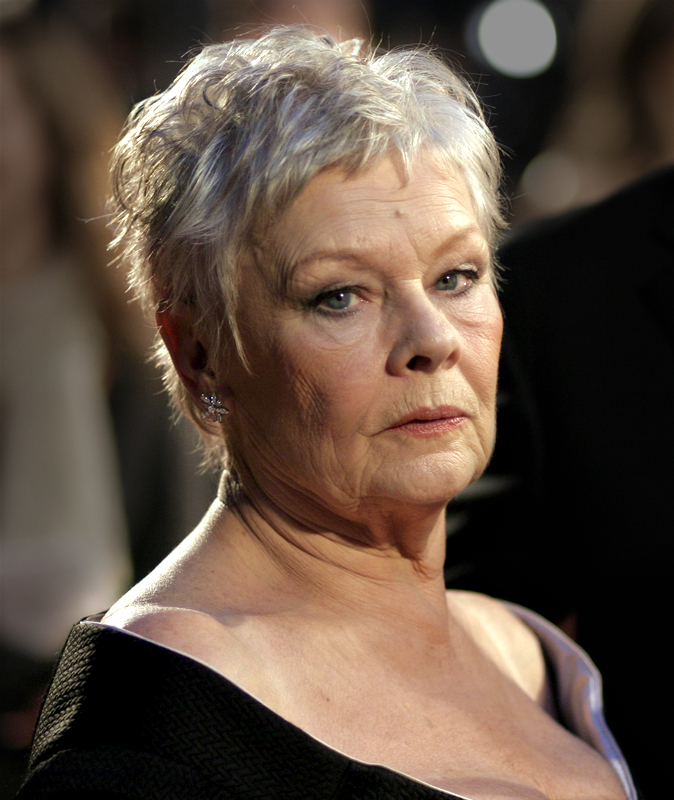
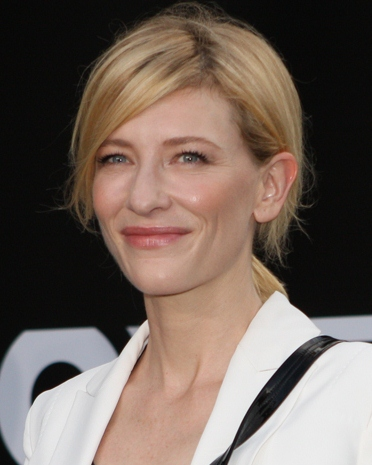
The performances of Judi Dench and Cate Blanchett garnered widespread critical acclaim, earning them Academy Award nominations for Best Actress and Best Supporting Actress, respectively.

American publications also gave the film acclaim, with the Los Angeles Times describing the film as "Sexy, aspirational and post-politically correct, Notes on a Scandal could turn out to be the Fatal Attraction of the noughties." The Washington Post noted the "dark brilliance" and that it "offers what is possibly the only intelligent account of such a disaster ever constructed, with a point of view that is somewhat gimlet-eyed and offered with absolutely no sentimentality whatsoever." The reviewer also identified the film as a "study in the anthropology of British liberal-left middle-class life." Chicago Sun-Times film critic Richard Roeper heaped praise on the film: "Perhaps the most impressive acting duo in any film of 2006. Dench and Blanchett are magnificent. Notes on a Scandal is whip-smart, sharp and grown up."

However, the Houston Chronicle criticised the film as a melodrama, saying, "Dramatic overstatement saturates just about every piece of this production".

=== Commercial ===
Notes on a Scandal grossed $49,752,391 worldwide, against a budget of $15 million.

== Soundtrack ==
The original score for the movie was composed by Philip Glass. The film also features the songs "Funky Kingston" by Toots and the Maytals and "Dizzy" by Siouxsie and the Banshees.

== Awards and nominations ==
79th Academy Awards:

- Nominated: Best Actress – Judi Dench
- Nominated: Best Supporting Actress – Cate Blanchett
- Nominated: Best Adapted Screenplay – Patrick Marber
- Nominated: Best Original Score – Philip Glass

60th BAFTA Awards:

- Nominated: Outstanding British Film
- Nominated: Best Actress in a Leading Role – Judi Dench
- Nominated: Best Adapted Screenplay – Patrick Marber

10th British Independent Film Awards:

- Nominated: Best British Independent Film
- Won: Best Performance by an Actress in a British Independent Film – Judi Dench
- Nominated: Best Performance by a Supporting Actor or Actress in a British Independent Film – Cate Blanchett
- Won: Best Screenplay – Patrick Marber

19th Chicago Film Critics Association Awards:

- Nominated: Best Actress – Judi Dench
- Nominated: Best Supporting Actress – Cate Blanchett
- Nominated: Best Adapted Screenplay – Patrick Marber
- Nominated: Best Original Score – Philip Glass

13th Critics' Choice Awards:

- Nominated: Best Picture
- Nominated: Best Actress – Judi Dench
- Nominated: Best Supporting Actress – Cate Blanchett

12th Dallas-Fort Worth Film Critics Association Awards:

- Won: Best Supporting Actress – Cate Blanchett

Evening Standard British Film Awards:

- Won: Best Actress – Judi Dench

11th Florida Film Critics Circle Awards:

- Won: Best Supporting Actress – Cate Blanchett

64th Golden Globe Awards:

- Nominated: Best Actress in a Motion Picture – Drama – Judi Dench
- Nominated: Best Supporting Actress – Motion Picture – Cate Blanchett
- Nominated: Best Screenplay – Patrick Marber

London Film Critics Circle Awards 2006:

- Nominated: Best Actress of the Year – Judi Dench
- Nominated: British Actress of the Year – Judi Dench
- Nominated: British Supporting Actor of the Year – Bill Nighy

Oklahoma Film Critics Circle Awards:

- Won: Best Supporting Actress – Cate Blanchett

Online Film Critics Awards:

- Nominated: Best Actress – Judi Dench
- Nominated: Best Supporting Actress – Cate Blanchett
- Nominated: Best Original Score – Philip Glass

Phoenix Film Critics Society Awards:

- Won: Best Supporting Actress – Cate Blanchett

13th Screen Actors Guild Awards:

- Nominated: Outstanding Performance by a Female Actor in a Leading Role – Judi Dench
- Nominated: Outstanding Performance by a Female Actor in a Supporting Role – Cate Blanchett

10th Toronto Film Critics Association Awards:

- Won: Best Supporting Actress – Cate Blanchett
