= Emily Kunstler =

American documentary filmmaker

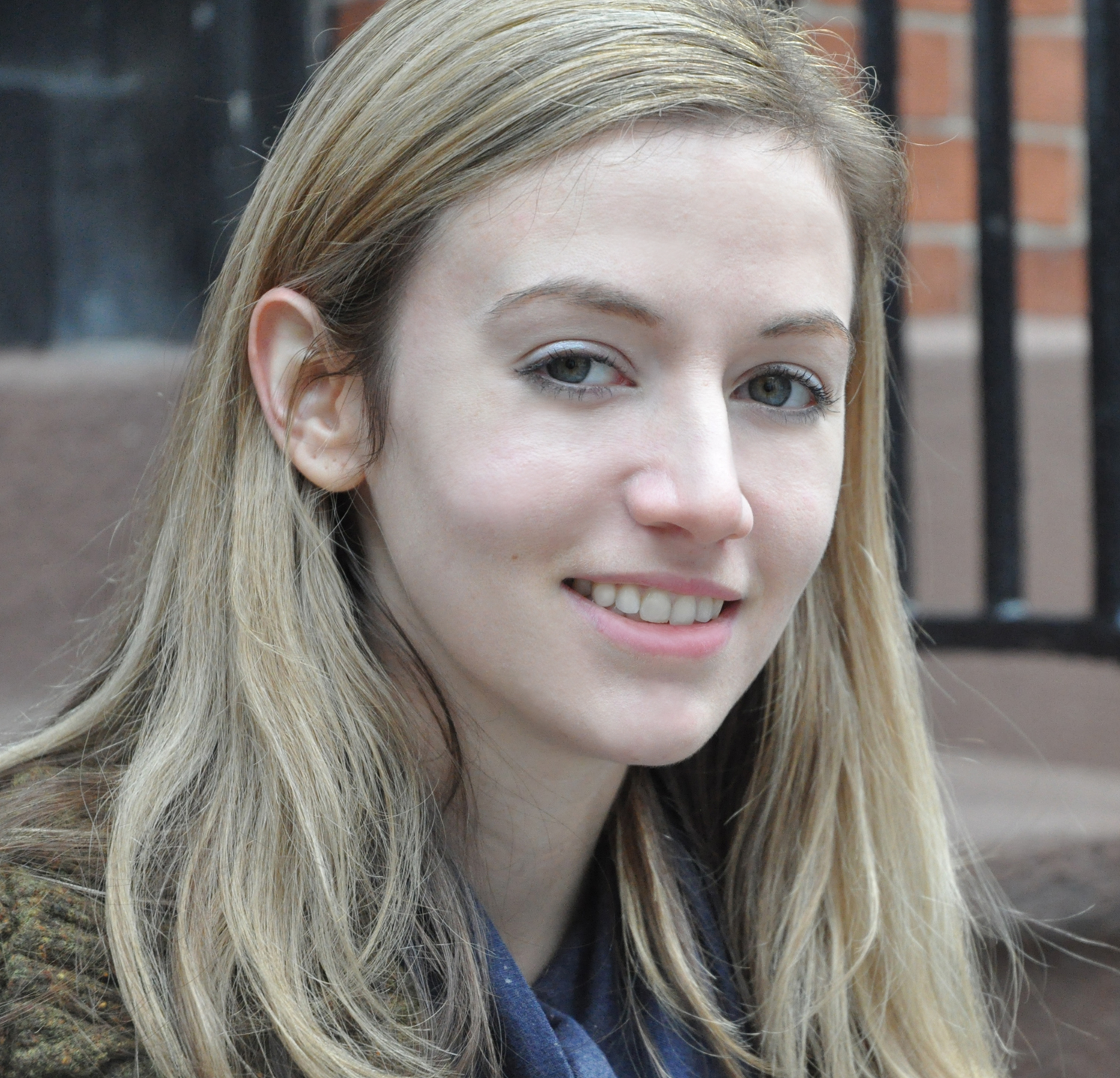
- Emily Kunstler in 2008
- Born: June 24, 1978 (age 48)
- Citizenship: United States of America
- Education: Tisch NYU
- Occupations: film director and producer
- Years active: 2003-present
- Parents: William Kunstler (father); Margaret Ratner Kunstler (mother)
- Relatives: Sarah Kunstler

Emily Kunstler (born June 24, 1978) is an American documentary filmmaker and activist. Her documentaries have won awards at South by Southwest and have been featured at Sundance. Kunstler is the daughter of lawyer William Kunstler, famous for his historic civil rights cases and Margaret Ratner Kunstler, a prominent New York human rights attorney.

== Career ==
In 2000, Kunstler co-founded Off Center Media with her sister Sarah Kunstler with the goal of exposing injustice in the criminal justice system through media creation.

In 2003, the sisters directed their short Tulia, Texas: Scenes from the Drug War. The film focused on the unlawful arrest and imprisonment of more than 10% of the black population of Tulia, Texas in 1999. The film won Best Short Documentary at the Woodstock Film Festival (2002) and her film Getting Through to the President won the Jury Prize at the Black Maria Film Festival and the Audience Choice Award at the Portland International Short Short Film Festival (2004).

In 2009, Kunstler and her sister released a feature-length documentary about their father entitled William Kunstler: Disturbing the Universe that screened at the Sundance Film Festival. The film was a co-production of the Independent Television Service and aired on the PBS series P.O.V.. The film was nominated for the Documentary Grand Jury Prize at the Sundance Film Festival and was among 15 films shortlisted for an Academy Award for Best Documentary Feature for the 83rd Academy Awards in 2010.

In 2021 Kunstler completed Who We Are: A Chronicle of Racism in America with her sister co-directing. It premiered at South by Southwest Film Festival and won the Audience Award in the Documentary Spotlight Category. The film was acquired by Sony Pictures Classics and theatrically released January 14, 2022.

== Personal life ==
Kunstler grew up in New York City's West Village neighborhood.

== Filmography ==
- How to Rig an Election: The Racist History of the 1876 Presidential Contest (2023), short
- Who We Are: A Chronicle of Racism in America (2021)
- William Kunstler: Disturbing the Universe (2009)
- Getting Through to the President (2004), short
- Tulia, Texas: Scenes from the Drug War (2003), short
