= Margaret Ratner Kunstler =

Civil rights attorney

Margaret Ratner Kunstler is a civil rights attorney who has worked with WikiLeaks, Julian Assange, and Sarah Harrison. She has also worked with Anonymous and was the attorney for Jeremy Hammond. Kunstler graduated from Sarah Lawrence College and Columbia Law School. She was the co-chair of the February 2022 Belmarsh Tribunal organized by Progressive International in New York City. After her husband, attorney William Kunstler, died, a dispute started with his former law partner, Ronald L. Kuby, over the right to use his name.

== 2016 US Presidential election ==
=== Donald Trump Jr. and WikiLeaks ===
Messages from WikiLeaks to Donald Trump Jr. identified Kunstler as a person at WikiLeaks for the Trump administration to contact with 'information for publication'. Trump Jr. said he never responded to the request, and that he never communicated directly with Assange and all of his correspondence with WikiLeaks went through "a lady that appeared to work at a law firm".

=== Roger Stone, Randy Credico and WikiLeaks ===
Kunstler, who Randy Credico said he is "best friends" with, arranged for Assange to be on Credico's August 25, 2016 radio show. Roger Stone suggested that Kunstler might have been a source for Credico.

The Roger Stone indictment suggests that Kunstler may have been asked to act as an intermediary during the pre-election months. At Stone's trial, Credico testified that Stone was actively trying to get Assange a preemptive pardon, and that he talked to Kunstler about it.

In mid-September 2016, Roger Stone sent Randy Credico an email asking him to check allegations about Hillary Clinton, and Credico forwarded the email to Kunstler. Credico said he didn't take it seriously and sent it to an old account Kunstler didn't check often. On October 1, Credico sent Stone a text message saying "Big news Wednesday...now pretend u don’t know me...Hillary’s campaign will die this week."

In November 2017, Senator Dianne Feinstein sent Kunstler a letter asking Kunstler to testify and turn over communications with the Trump campaign and family, and records "of any effort to obtain or share" hacked emails from the DNC or Clinton campaign. Kunstler refused, citing attorney-client privilege.

In 2017 and 2018, Roger Stone threatened to make Credico's outreach to Kunstler public, and to file a bar complaint against Kunstler.

In 2019, Kunstler was a witness for the government in the case against Roger Stone, where she testified she mostly ignored Credico's email and said she didn't have insider knowledge about Assange's efforts during the 2016 campaign.

== Kunstler v. Central Intelligence Agency ==
Kunstler v. Central Intelligence Agency is a lawsuit filed in August 2022 by lawyers Margaret Kunstler and Deborah Hrbek, and journalists Charles Glass and John Goetz against the Central Intelligence Agency, former CIA Director Mike Pompeo, Undercover Global S.L. (UC Global), and UC Global's owner David Morales. The lawsuit alleges that UC Global, which was providing security for the Ecuadorian embassy in London, had recorded the complainants conversations with Julian Assange and copied their phones and computers. It alleges that UC Global provided the information it copied to the CIA, which was headed by Pompeo at the time. The CIA is prohibited from targeting U.S. citizens. In an internal email, Morales told workers that UC Global was profiling Assange's visitors and aides because he had been "informed of suspicions that [Assange] is working for the Russian intelligence services".

== Personal life ==
Margaret Ratner Kunstler was married to William Kunstler, who died in 1995. The two had two daughters Sarah Kunstler and Emily Kunstler, and several grandchildren.

Margaret was previously married to Michael Ratner.
