= Nick Alphin =

American sound engineer

- Born: August 27, 1935
- Died: September 28, 2024 (aged 89)
- Occupation: Sound engineer
- Years active: 1979–1996

Harry "Nick" Alphin Jr. is an American sound engineer. He was nominated for an Academy Award in the category Best Sound for the film The River.

== Selected filmography ==
- The River (1984)
