= Sarah Kunstler =

American lawyer and filmmaker (born 1976)

- Born: 1976 (age 49–50)
- Citizenship: United States of America
- Education: Columbia Law School
- Occupations: Attorney, Film director and producer,
- Years active: 2003-present
- Spouse: Jesse Ferguson
- Children: 1
- Parents: William Kunstler (father); Margaret Ratner Kunstler (mother)
- Relatives: Emily Kunstler

Sarah Kunstler (born 1976) is an American documentary filmmaker and lawyer. Her political documentaries have won awards at South by Southwest and the Seattle International Film Festival. She is the daughter of famous lawyer and civil rights activist William Kunstler and civil rights lawyer Margaret Ratner Kunstler.

== Career ==
Sarah Kunstler first began directing films in 2003 with her sister creating their debut short Tulia, Texas: Scenes from the Drug War. The film focuses on the unlawful arrest and imprisonment of more than 10% of the black population of the small town of Tulia, Texas that occurred in 1999. This began her career making political documentaries with her sister Emily Kunstler.

In 2009, the sisters released their first documentary feature film William Kunstler: Disturbing the Universe at the Sundance Film Festival. The film is a documentary about their father William Kunstler a civil rights lawyer, who was both widely admired and widely despised for his defense of people ranging from Martin Luther King, Jr. to John Gotti. At Sundance the film was nominated for the Documentary Grand Jury Prize and was Shortlisted for Best Documentary for the 83rd Academy Awards in 2011.

In 2021 Kunstler co-directed Who We Are: A Chronicle of Racism in America. It premiered at the South by Southwest Film Festival where it won the Audience Award in the Documentary Spotlight Category. The film focuses on anti-Black racism in America and a series of lectures given by criminal defense attorney Jeffery Robinson on the topic.

In 2023, Kunstler co-directed How to Rig An Election: The Racist History of the 1876 Presidential Contest with her sister. It was narrated by Tom Hanks and distributed by the Washington Post in their opinion section after its premiere at South by Southwest.

== Awards ==
In 2021, she won the Golden Space Needle for Best Documentary at the Seattle International Film Festival for Who We Are: A Chronicle of Racism in America.

Her film William Kunstler: Disturbing the Universe won the Audience Award in the Documentary Spotlight Category at SXSW in 2009.

== Filmography ==
- How to Rig an Election: The Racist History of the 1876 Presidential Contest (2023), short
- Who We Are: A Chronicle of Racism in America (2021)
- William Kunstler: Disturbing the Universe (2009)
- Getting Through to the President (2004), short
- Tulia, Texas: Scenes from the Drug War (2003), short
