= Ghostbox Cowboy =

2018 American dark comedy film

- Theatrical release poster
- Directed by: John Maringouin
- Screenplay by: John Maringouin
- Story by: John Maringouin; David Zellner; Specialist
- Produced by: Sean Gillane; Molly Lynch; John Montague; George Rush; John Maringouin
- Starring: David Zellner; Robert Longstreet; Specialist; Vincent Xie; J.R. Cazet; Angelina Liu; Carrie Gege Zhang; Nicholas Grgich; Nan Lin; George Rush; John Montague
- Edited by: John Maringouin; Sean Gillane
- Music by: Casey Wayne McAllister
- Production companies: Lightshow Films; Bighorn Global; 23rd Street Productions; Scope Dog; SARTRE; Swamp Donkey Films; Epic Match Media
- Release dates: April 2018 (Tribeca Film Festival); November 30, 2018 (United States)
- Running time: 111 minutes
- Country: United States
- Languages: English; Mandarin

Ghostbox Cowboy is a 2018 American dark comedy film written and directed by John Maringouin. The film was developed from a story by Maringouin, David Zellner, and Specialist, an American entrepreneur from Joshua Tree, California who co-stars as a version of himself: a grey-market fixer operating in the underbelly of Chinese commerce. The film stars Zellner as Jimmy Van Horn, a Texan entrepreneur who travels to Shenzhen, China to sell a device he claims can communicate with the dead to Chinese investors. It is the first narrative fiction feature ever shot in Shenzhen.

The film blends scripted narrative with documentary footage and features real figures from Chinese tech and investment circles playing versions of themselves. It was nominated for Best Narrative Feature at the 2018 Tribeca Film Festival, where it received its world premiere. It holds a 100% approval rating on Rotten Tomatoes and was named a New York Times Critics' Pick.

== Plot ==
Jimmy Van Horn (David Zellner) is a middle-aged Texan who has grown disillusioned with American economic life. He travels to Shenzhen, China to pitch a product called Ghostr, an electromagnetic device he claims can facilitate communication with the dead.

In Shenzhen, Jimmy reconnects with Bob Granger (Robert Longstreet), an old acquaintance now presenting himself as the CEO of a company called Freedentures.com. Bob wears a blonde wig and moves through the Chinese investment world with apparent ease, introducing Jimmy to factory owners, investors, and Specialist (played by himself), an American from Joshua Tree, California operating in the grey zones of Chinese commerce.

Jimmy secures Bitcoin investment and gains brief traction in the Chinese tech sector. His fortunes collapse, leaving him broke and dependent on American expats who take advantage of people like him. In the second half of the film, Jimmy travels to find Johnny Mai Thai (J.R. Cazet), an extreme plastic surgery victim with a thick Cajun accent. The film concludes in Ordos, Inner Mongolia, a city built for millions that was largely abandoned following an economic collapse, and ends on an ambiguous note.

== Cast ==
- David Zellner as Jimmy Van Horn, a Texan entrepreneur
- Robert Longstreet as Bob Granger
- Specialist as himself, an American fixer operating in Shenzhen
- Vincent Xie as himself, described in the film as an Apple global supply manager
- J.R. Cazet as Johnny Mai Thai
- Angelina Liu as Joanna
- Carrie Gege Zhang in a supporting role
- Nicholas Grgich as Ronnie
- Nan Lin as Donny
- George Rush as Lazer Fox
- John Montague as a Mandarin-speaking businessman

J.R. Cazet is the director's cousin, a tugboat captain from Louisiana making his film debut. Several other cast members are real figures from Chinese tech and investment circles appearing in fictionalised versions of themselves. Producer George Rush, who also produced Sorry to Bother You (2018), plays a character called Lazer Fox.

== Production ==
=== Development ===
Maringouin conceived the film while living in San Francisco, where he said he was surrounded by the kind of entrepreneurial culture he wanted to satirise. He has described his intention as making a crime film set against the backdrop of the Chinese tech sector. During production, he had the cast listen to Tim Ferriss's The 4-Hour Workweek on audiobook during van rides through China.

The screenplay was written by Maringouin from a story developed with Zellner and Specialist. Maringouin has said Specialist's actual work in China, which he declined to describe in interviews, closely resembles his role in the film.

=== Filming ===
The production used inconspicuous handheld cameras and shot largely without permission in Shenzhen's commercial zones, factory districts, and markets. Zellner's schedule allowed only a limited window and Longstreet was available for nine days. Neither actor had seen most locations before arriving to film them. A planned factory shoot was abandoned when owners objected to the camera and the crew relocated to a nearby abandoned shopping mall.

Portions of the film were shot in Ordos, Inner Mongolia, a large planned city that was largely abandoned after an economic collapse. During the shoot the crew encountered a vehicle broadcasting recorded propaganda about personal hygiene through a loudspeaker. They were unable to film it and later recreated the scene with an actor in a different location.

The film is the first narrative fiction feature ever shot in Shenzhen.

== Release ==
The film had its world premiere in the narrative competition of the 2018 Tribeca Film Festival in April 2018, where it was nominated for Best Narrative Feature. It subsequently won the American Indie Narrative Award at the 41st Denver Film Festival, with the jury describing it as "delightfully off-kilter" and "a Dark Comedy that will leave you thirsty for the American Dream we knew and loved." It received a limited theatrical and video on demand release in the United States on November 30, 2018 and is available on MUBI and Amazon Prime Video.

== Critical reception ==
Ghostbox Cowboy holds a 100% approval rating on Rotten Tomatoes and was named a New York Times Critics' Pick.

Writing in the New York Times, Glenn Kenny named the film a Critics' Pick, calling it "a scary, dryly funny dissection of entrepreneurial absurdism bleeding into existential and metaphysical despair" and "shot and edited to look like a documentary of a nightmare." Kenny described it as "a genuine find," writing that "it's rare that a release so late in the year is so noteworthy."

Writing in Variety, Dennis Harvey called it "an original if sometimes befuddling vision" that resembles "Fear and Loathing in the Chinese Economic Miracle," praising its blending of fiction and documentary as having "a kind of exhilarating chaos to it, something comparable to relatively few prior films."

Writing for IONCINEMA, Matt Delman awarded the film four out of four stars, calling it "a no-frills Pynchonian mind-blowing masterpiece." Delman compared the film to the Safdie Brothers' Good Time and Donald Glover's series Atlanta, and described Robert Longstreet's performance as "freakishly good."

Eric Kohn of IndieWire called it something that "truly defies categorization, and remains so unpredictable that no single viewing can resolve the fertile ideas it puts on the table." Noel Murray of the Los Angeles Times called the film "unique, and often off-putting, in ways that should be exciting to open-minded cinephiles." Film Threat described it as "a wonderful mishmash of mockumentary" and "a completely unique animal," while noting comparisons to the work of Ulrich Seidl, Harmony Korine, Terry Gilliam, and Werner Herzog.

The Hollywood Reporter described the film as having "cult" potential and noted that J.R. Cazet's Johnny Mai Thai is "a Kurtz-like figure, doling out aphorisms and loopy anecdotes." Writing in Metacritic, one critic described it as feeling "like a William Gibson adaptation directed by David Lynch and Jean-Luc Godard."
