= The River (1984 film) =

1984 film directed by Mark Rydell

- Theatrical release poster
- Directed by: Mark Rydell
- Written by: Robert Dillon; Julian Barry
- Story by: Robert Dillon
- Produced by: Robert Cortes; Edward Lewis
- Starring: Sissy Spacek; Mel Gibson; Scott Glenn
- Cinematography: Vilmos Zsigmond
- Edited by: Sidney Levin
- Music by: John Williams
- Production company: Universal Pictures
- Distributed by: Universal Pictures
- Release date: December 19, 1984
- Running time: 123 minutes
- Country: United States
- Language: English
- Budget: $18 million
- Box office: $11.5 million (North America)

The River is a 1984 American Southern Gothic drama film directed by Mark Rydell and starring Sissy Spacek, Mel Gibson (in his American film debut), and Scott Glenn. Set in the Ridge-and-Valley Appalachians countryside of East Tennessee, the film is about a farm couple and their children who struggle to operate their multi-generational family farm along the banks of a river prone to flooding destroying their crops, and a developer who seeks to acquire their farm for a dam.

Considered by Rydell to be a tribute to the vanishing American family farm, The River was the last of a trio of "farm films" released by Hollywood in 1984, with the others being Country and Places in the Heart. All three films shared themes of a family's devotion to their farm, the destructive force of nature, an unsympathetic bureaucracy, and a determined woman who binds her family together.

The River was theatrically released on December 19, 1984, by Universal Pictures. It was a box office failure and received mixed reviews, with critics praising Spacek and Glenn's performances while criticizing Gibson's. Nonetheless, the film received four Oscar nominations at the 57th Academy Awards, including Best Actress (for Spacek) and Best Original Score, and won a Special Achievement Award for sound effects editing.

== Plot ==
Tom and Mae Garvey are a hard-working couple living with their two children on the East Tennessee farm owned by Tom's family for generations. They and many of their neighbors have hit hard times. A downturn in the economy has led to dwindling land prices.

Their biggest problem has been that their crop land has been prone to flooding as the property is adjacent to a river. Manipulating the powers that be include local senator Neiswinder and the local bank. Joe Wade, who grew up in the area and runs the milling company that sets the local grain prices, is secretly working to buy the properties along the river so he can build a dam that would generate electricity and provide irrigation opportunities for farm properties away from the river, such as his own.

Wade's maneuverings coupled with many other farming problems make it increasingly difficult for Tom and Mae to hold on to the land. Tom begins work at a steel factory in order to prevent foreclosure on his farm, only finding out he's a strikebreaker as they're crossing the picket lines. Work in the mill is incredibly hard, the conditions are tough and pay is meager.

The rest of the Garvey family is left alone while Tom is away working. Mae is involved in an accident on the farm where she loses a lot of blood and almost her arm. Some time later, Tom invites his family to visit him in the city where he and Mae compare how things are going in their daily lives. The strike ends, but as part of the returning workers' deal, the strike breakers must walk out of the factory without the protection they had when entering. Instead of an all-out fight, the workers and scabs observe one another, recognizing each other's desperation before the workers begin shaming the scabs.

Tom returns to the farm and is pleased with the crops, but Wade has Tom's corn inspected. He offers less than what the crop cost Tom to plant, which leads to a confrontation where Wade reveals his plans for a hydroelectric dam and the redevelopment of Tom's land. Tom returns to the farm where his machinery is failing and another flood threatens the farm.

An exhausted Mae confronts Tom over his stubbornness, as he is fighting a losing battle with Wade and the river. The farming community bands together to build a levee, providing some relief. Wade arrives with a truck full of bankrupt farmers intent on dismantling the levee for cash. Wade offers the farmers on Tom's side a bonus if they sabotage the levee. Tom pleads with both sides, many of whom were in his shoes but lost their farms. However, the levee is breached and the floodwaters flow in. Despite all of this, Tom begins picking up sandbags to repair the levee alone. Inspired by his dedication, his family and the onlookers help him repair the levee. Wade realizes he's lost the battle and admires Tom's determination but points out that sooner or later nature will upend the farm and Wade will be waiting.

The Garvey family has a successful harvest.

== Cast ==
- Sissy Spacek as Mae Garvey
- Mel Gibson as Tom Garvey
- Scott Glenn as Joe Wade
- Shane Bailey as Lewis Garvey
- Becky Jo Lynch as Beth Garvey
- Barry Primus as Roy
- Charlie Robinson as Truck
- Billy Green Bush as Harvey "Harve" Stanley
- Don Hood as Senator Neiswinder
- James Tolkan as Howard Simpson
- Bob W. Douglas as Hal Richardson
- Andrew Stahl as Dave Birkin
- Lisa Sloan as Judy Birkin
- Larry D. Ferrell as Rod Tessley
- Amy Rydell as Betty Gaumer
- Jack Starrett as Swick

== Production ==
=== Development and casting ===
Writers Robert Dillon and Julian Barry based the screenplay on actual stories of East Tennessee farmers who lost their crops due to damage caused by bad weather, and having to reluctantly work industrial jobs as strikebreakers in nearby cities to avoid foreclosure on their farmland.

Director Mark Rydell viewed the characters in this drama as iconically American, and he was eager to cast Sissy Spacek as the farm wife because of her performance in Coal Miner's Daughter and her home on a farm near Charlottesville, Virginia. Rydell said, "She is the consummate American rural young woman, with strength and fiber and a luminous quality." Mel Gibson begged Rydell to let him play the Tennessee farmer who reminded him of his father, but the director was reluctant because of Gibson's Australian accent. Before Gibson left for England to film The Bounty, he begged Rydell not to cast the part yet. Rydell recalled, "He came back to my house in Los Angeles and started reading the script, talking, reading the newspaper, in this perfect Tennessee accent. I was really impressed, even when he stood next to Sissy, who's like a tuning fork when it comes to accents, he had damn well done it." For the role of Lewis Garvey, the oldest son of the Garvey family, Lynn Stalmaster cast East Tennessee native Shane Bailey, who grew up east of the farm's filming location in the town of Surgoinsville, Tennessee, out of thousands of boys from across the country. Stalmaster chose Becky Jo Lynch, a native of Jonesborough, Tennessee, for the role of Beth Garvey, the younger daughter of the Garvey family.

=== Filming ===
Filming took place from September to December 1983 primarily in East Tennessee on farmland in Hawkins County along the banks of the Holston River for the Garvey farm, with additional scenes shot in Jonesborough for the farm auction scenes, Gate City, Virginia and Kingsport, Tennessee for the scenes depicting the small towns near the Garvey farm, and in Birmingham, Alabama for industrial scenes depicting the steel mill where Tom Garvey finds work. The filmmakers purchased 440 acres (1.8 km^{2}) along the Holston for the farm set and planted corn. Most of the filming was done along Goshen Valley Road and around the Goshen Valley Park area. Goshen Valley Road heads south from highway 11W in Church Hill, Tennessee. The cast and their families moved to the area a month before the start of production to connect with the local people and learn farming skills.

The floods in the film were supplied by the Tennessee Valley Authority and the Army Corps of Engineers with water from the Fort Patrick Henry Dam. The bank and downtown scenes were filmed in the town of Gate City, Virginia. The tent city and a few other scenes were filmed in Kingsport, Tennessee, while some factory scenes were filmed in Birmingham, Alabama.

Scenes that were filmed at Double Springs Baptist Church in Jonesborough, Tennessee did not make the final cut of the movie. The film was completed for under $18 million.

== Music ==
The musical score was composed and conducted by John Williams, and also featured songs by country artists including George Strait.

It was announced that Intrada Records will release an expanded and remastered version of Williams' score on May 5, 2020. The new release will feature the complete score (including previous and unheard content) and the original soundtrack album.

== Release ==
In October 1984, community members and local agencies organized a two-day music festival on the production site of the Garvey family farm in Hawkins County to serve as a reunion of cast members and film crew to celebrate the release of the film.

The River premiered at the Beekman Theatre in the Upper East Side neighborhood of New York City on December 19, 1984. An additional local premiere was held in Kingsport, Tennessee at the Eastman Chemical Company's Toy F. Reid Center on their Kingsport plant site, with Bailey and Lynch in attendance.

== Reception ==
=== Box office ===
The film opened Wednesday, December 19, 1984, in 3 theaters and grossed $40,540 in its first seven days to Christmas Day and went on to gross $11.5 million in the United States and Canada.

=== Critical response ===
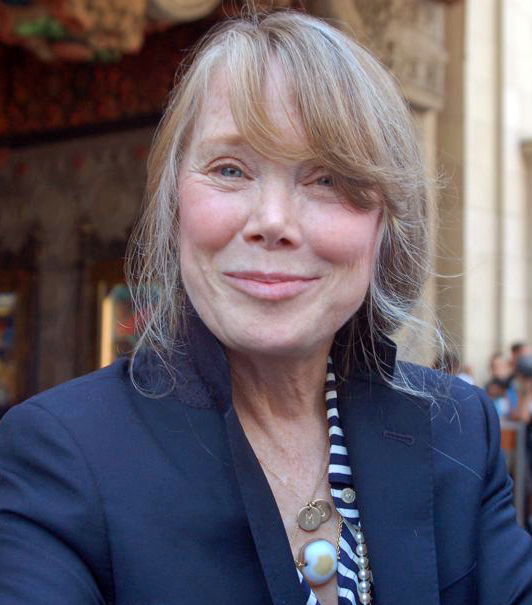
Sissy Spacek's performance received positive reviews, earning her a nomination for the Academy Award for Best Actress.

The film received mixed reviews at its initial release, with praise for the performances by Sissy Spacek and Scott Glenn, the realist nature towards the topic of the decline of American family farming, Rydell's direction, the score by John Williams, and the cinematography by Vilmos Zsigmond. However, the screenplay and Gibson's performance were criticized.

In retrospective review, critics have had more positive reviews of the film regarding its unironic and grim reality of the struggles of Tennessee farmers, pointing out that initial mixed and negative reviews were likely driven by fatigue due to the film's release after similar story-driven films such as Country and Places in the Heart.

On Rotten Tomatoes, it holds an approval rating of 27% on Rotten Tomatoes from 22 critics.

=== Awards and nominations ===
Institution	Category	Nominee(s)	Result	Ref.
57th Academy Awards	Best Actress	Sissy Spacek	Nominated	
57th Academy Awards	Best Original Score	John Williams	Nominated	
57th Academy Awards	Best Cinematography	Vilmos Zsigmond	Nominated	
57th Academy Awards	Best Sound	Nick Alphin, Robert Thirlwell, Richard Portman, David M. Ronne	Nominated	
57th Academy Awards	Special Achievement (for sound effects editing)	Kay Rose	Won	
42nd Golden Globes	Best Actress in a Motion Picture – Drama	Sissy Spacek	Nominated	
42nd Golden Globes	Best Original Score	John Williams	Nominated	
1985 Golden Reel Awards	Outstanding Achievement in Sound Editing – Sound Effects and Foley for Feature Film	Kay Rose	Won	

== Legacy ==
After filming had wrapped up on the production of The River, the 440-acre parcel along the Holston River that Universal Studios purchased for the Garvey family farm was gifted to the government of Hawkins County for the community's generosity and help given during the filming of the feature.

Hawkins County redeveloped the farmland and surrounding woodlands into a public park known as Laurel Run Park in August 1985.

== See also ==
- List of river films and television series
