= Notes on a Scandal =

Book by Zoë Heller

- First edition UK cover
- Author: Zoë Heller
- Language: English
- Genre: Fiction
- Publisher: Viking
- Publication date: June 5, 2003 (UK)
- Publication place: United Kingdom
- Media type: Print (Hardcover and Paperback)
- Pages: 256 pp
- ISBN: 0-670-91406-1
- OCLC: 51912896

Notes on a Scandal (What Was She Thinking? Notes on a Scandal in the U.S.) is a 2003 novel by Zoë Heller. It is about a female teacher at a London comprehensive school who begins an affair with an underage pupil. Heller said to The Observer in 2003 that the real-life controversy of American middle-school teacher Mary Kay LeTourneau's affair with a student was the inspiration for the novel. A film adaptation was released in 2006, starring Judi Dench and Cate Blanchett. The film received four Academy Award nominations, including nominations for Dench and Blanchett.

== Plot summary ==
Art teacher Bathsheba "Sheba" Hart falls in love with a 15-year-old pupil, Steven Connolly, who is from a deprived background and has literacy problems. Although they frequently have sex in risky places, including at school and in the open on Hampstead Heath, the couple successfully conceal their affair from colleagues and family. Sheba tells her coworker Barbara what has happened between her and Connolly, though she claims that he only tried to kiss her and she discouraged his advances.

Barbara eventually finds out about the affair on Guy Fawkes Night, when she sees Sheba talking to Connolly on Primrose Hill. Barbara feels betrayed that Sheba did not confide in her properly and is angered by Sheba's neglect of their friendship. (Barbara is herself a lonely woman whose neediness has driven away more than one potential friend.)

Over time, Connolly's interest in the affair wanes as Sheba's grows. Sheba still does not break off the affair, having become quite enslaved to the now barely interested Connolly. Her obsession continues even after he abandons her for a girl his own age.

Brian Bangs, a mathematics teacher, asks Barbara to have Saturday lunch with him one day. He confesses his infatuation with Sheba, leading Barbara to realise that he only asked her out to use her as a means to discover information about Sheba's private life. Overcome by jealousy, Barbara alludes to Sheba's secret.

The school's headmaster is somehow informed about the illicit affair. Sheba is suspended from her job and charged with indecent assault on a pupil. Her husband demands that she leave the family home and prevents her from seeing their children, especially their son Ben, who has Down syndrome. While Sheba's life is quickly disintegrating, Barbara thrives on the new situation, which she considers her chance to prove her qualities as a friend. When the headmaster forces her into early retirement, Barbara gives up the lease on her own small flat and moves in with Sheba and her brother.

Sheba discovers Barbara has been writing an account of Sheba's relationship with Connolly. She is distraught and furious, not least because Barbara has written about events she did not personally witness, and made judgements about people close to Sheba. She is eventually reconciled with Barbara due to their shared desperation and loneliness. Even now, Barbara uses their desperate circumstances as yet another opportunity to further their relationship, and the mentally weakened Sheba can do little to resist. The novel ends with Sheba, trapped and demoralised, resigning to Barbara's dominance of her.

== Reception ==
The novel was shortlisted for the 2003 Man Booker Prize and placed second for the Barnes & Noble Discover Great New Writers Award. The Guardian ranked What Was She Thinking? Notes on a Scandal #70 in their list of 100 Best Books of the 21st Century. The novel was translated into several languages, including French, Italian, Spanish and German.
