= Zoë Heller =

English journalist and novelist

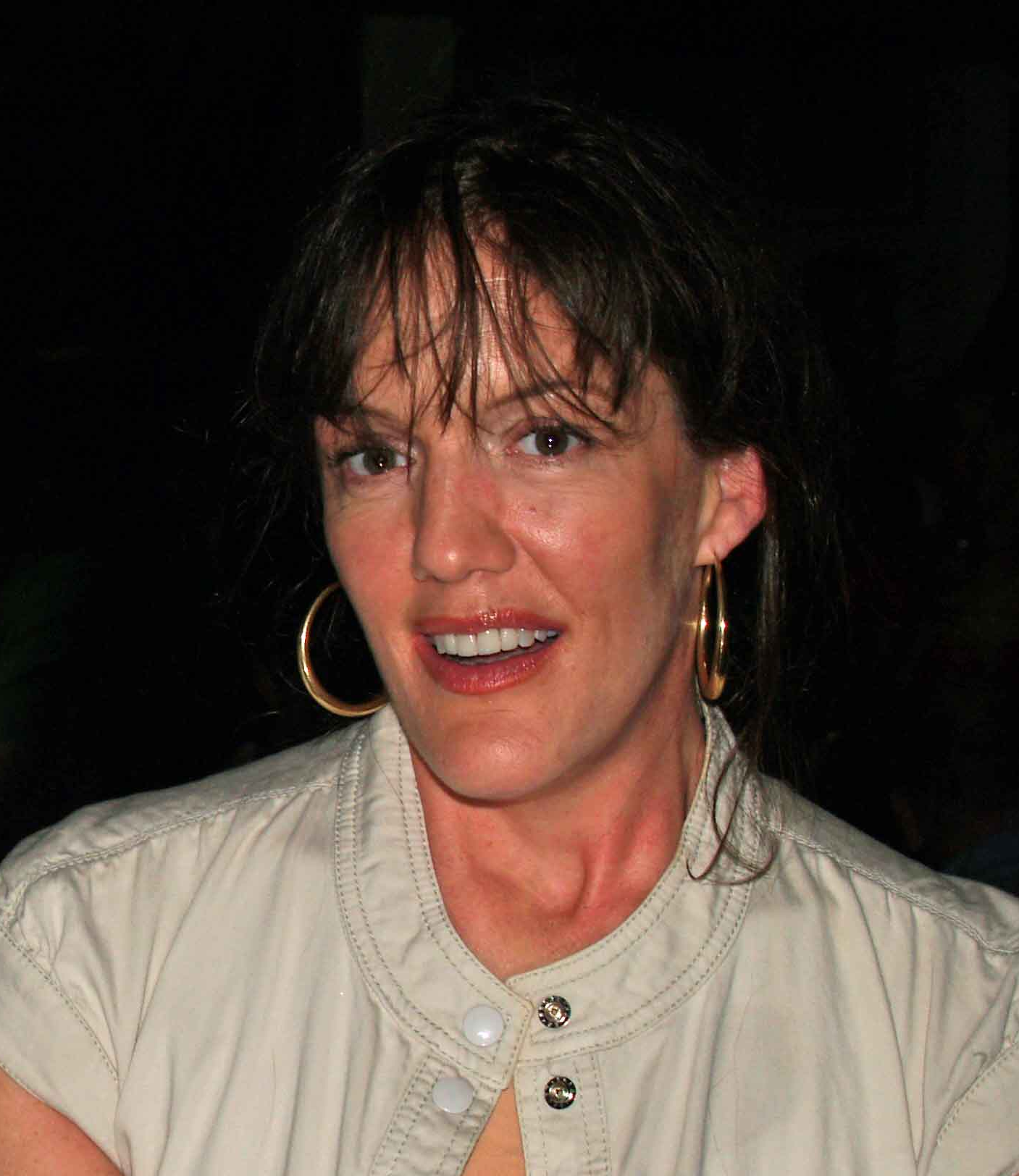
- Heller in 2007
- Born: Zoë Kate Hinde Heller; 7 July 1965 (age 61); St Pancras, London, England
- Education: St Anne's College, Oxford; Columbia University (M.A.)
- Occupations: Journalist, novelist
- Spouse: Lawrence Konner (separated)
- Children: 2
- Parent(s): Lukas Heller; Caroline Carter Heller
- Relatives: Bruno Heller (brother); Cordelia Edvardson (aunt); Hermann Heller (grandfather)

Zoë Kate Hinde Heller (born 7 July 1965) is an English journalist and novelist resident in New York City. She has published three novels, Everything You Know (1999), Notes on a Scandal (2003), and The Believers (2008). Notes on a Scandal was shortlisted for the Booker Prize and was adapted for a feature film in 2006.

== Biography ==
=== Early life ===
Heller was born in St Pancras, north London, as the youngest of four children of Caroline (née Carter) and Lukas Heller, a successful screenwriter; her parents separated when she was five. Her father was a German Jewish immigrant and her mother was English and a Quaker. Her paternal grandfather was the political philosopher Hermann Heller. Her brother is screenwriter Bruno Heller. Her sister, Lucy Heller, is Chief Executive of education charity Ark and previously Managing Director of Times Supplements Ltd, the former educational publishing wing of News UK.

She attended Haverstock School in north London where she was a contemporary of David Miliband and then studied English at St Anne's College, Oxford, gaining a first, before going on to Columbia University, New York where she received an MA on Marxist theories of literature and Jonathan Swift.

=== Career ===
After a period at the UK publisher Chatto and a spell as a freelance book reviewer, Heller was taken on as a staff feature writer for The Independent on Sunday. She later returned to New York in the early 1990s contracted to write for Vanity Fair. Deputizing for Nick Hornby while he was on holiday led to her reputation as a confessional writer. She wrote for The New Yorker, a weekly column for The Sunday Times Magazine in the UK, and was a columnist for The Daily Telegraph, for which she won the British Press Awards' "Columnist of the Year" in 2002. She co-wrote the screenplay for the independent film Twenty-One (1991).

== Publications ==
Heller has published three novels: Everything You Know (1999), Notes on a Scandal (2003), which was one of six books shortlisted for the Booker Prize and was made into a film in 2006, and The Believers (2008). The Believers was shortlisted for the International Dublin Literary Award in 2010.

In 2009, she donated the short story What She Did on Her Summer Vacation to Oxfam's Ox-Tales project, four collections of UK stories written by 38 authors. Her story was published in the Water collection.

== Personal life ==
In 2006, she married screenwriter Lawrence Konner in a "minimally" Jewish ceremony; the couple separated in 2010. Heller lives in New York City with her two daughters, Lula and Frankie.
