= The River (1933 film) =

1933 Czechoslovak film

- Directed by: Josef Rovenský
- Written by: Jan Reiter; Josef Rovenský
- Starring: Jarmila Beránková; Václav Jalovec
- Cinematography: Jan Stallich
- Music by: Josef Dobeš
- Production company: Reiter
- Distributed by: Elektafilm
- Release date: 13 October 1933
- Running time: 87 min
- Country: Czechoslovakia
- Languages: Czech; German

The River (Czech: Řeka) is a 1933 Czechoslovak film drama directed by Josef Rovenský. The film was also released with German voiceovers under the title Junge Liebe in 1934.

The film won Best Director Prize at 1934 Venice Film Festival.

== Production ==
The film was shot in 12 days — 3 days for exteriors and 9 days in the studio. The outdoor scenes were filmed around Poříčí nad Sázavou and in hotel Hubertus in Jíloviště.

== Cast ==
- Jarmila Beránková as Pepička Matuková
- Václav Jalovec as Pavel Sychra
- Jaroslav Vojta as Jan Sychra, Pavel's father
- Hermína Vojtová as Pavel's mother
- Jan Sviták as Poacher Václav Zimák
- Rudolf Deyl sr. as Teacher
- Jan W. Speerger as Gendarme
- Antonín Marlé as Buyer
- Marie Rýdlová as Buyer's wife
- Jaroslav Marvan as Director of the hotel
- Josef Rovenský as Poacher

== Release ==
The premiere was in Lucerna cinema in Prague on 13 October 1933. The film was commercially very successful. It won a Best Director Prize at 1934 Venice Film Festival and was distributed in 30 countries. It was the first Czechoslovak film distributed in Japan and India.
