= Colin Brown (film journalist) =

British film journalist

- Born: 1962; United Kingdom
- Education: St John's College, Cambridge
- Occupations: Film journalist, editor
- Employer: Screen International
- Known for: Editor-in-chief, Screen International; Editorial Director, Slated

Colin Brown (born 1962) is a British film journalist, based in New York City, who has been editor and editor-in-chief of the trade magazine Screen International.

Brown was educated at St John's College, Cambridge and went into journalism on graduation. He joined Screen International in 1987 and was appointed as new editor in January 1989. He has spent the whole of his career to date working for Screen International. He was editor-in-chief from 1998 to 2008.

Brown is also a keen supporter of Leeds United A. F. C.
