= Martin Strel =

Slovenian swimmer

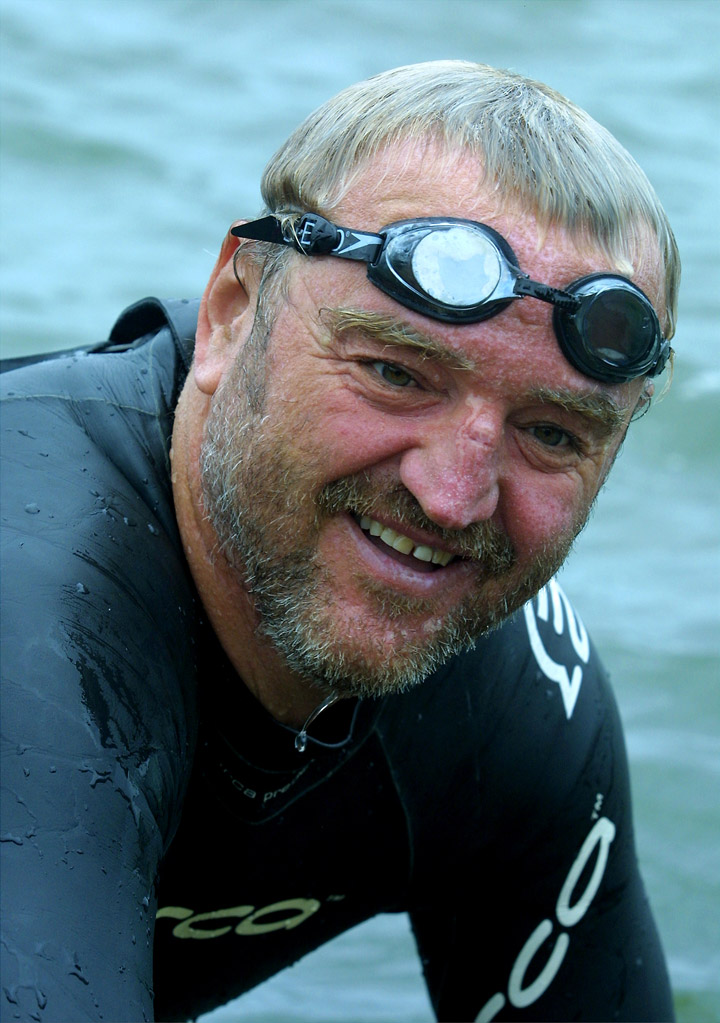
- Martin Strel-Big River Man
- Born: 1 October 1954 (age 71); Mokronog, SR Slovenia, SFR Yugoslavia (Now Slovenia)
- Occupation: long-distance swimmer
- Known for: Swam world's biggest rivers, holder of 4 Guinness World Records
- Height: 1.8 m (5 ft 11 in)
- Website: www.martinstrel.com

Martin Strel (born 1 October 1954), is a Slovenian long-distance swimmer, an elite endurance athlete, best known for swimming the entire length of various rivers. Strel holds successive Guinness World Records for swimming the Danube river, the Mississippi River, the Yangtze River, and the Amazon River. His motto is "swimming for peace, friendship and clean waters."

== Swimming history ==
Strel was born in the town of Mokronog, in the Slovenian region of Lower Carniola, then part of the Socialist Federal Republic of Yugoslavia. Strel's first two river swims were the Krka river (105 kilometres) in his homeland, in 28 hours in 1992, and the boundary Kolpa river (62 km (39 mi)), in 16 hours in 1993. In 2000, he swam the Danube River (2,860 km (1,780 mi)) and achieved the world long distance swimming record (3,004 kilometres (1,867 mi)) in 58 days. In July 2001, he achieved one more world record — 504.5 kilometres (313.5 mi) of non-stop swimming in Danube within 84 hours and 10 minutes. He lost 40 pounds of weight.

In 2002, he swam the entire Mississippi River (3,885 km (2,414 mi)) in 68 days. In 2003, he swam the Argentine Paraná River (3,998 kilometres (2,484 mi)). On 10 June 2004, Martin started swimming down the Yangtze River (4,003 km (2,487 mi), the longest river in Asia, the third longest in the world) in China. He reached Shanghai in 40 days on 30 July 2004, one day before planned.

Strel swam the Amazon River, commencing on 1 February 2007, finishing 66 days later on 7 April 2007. This was a record-breaking distance of 5,268 km (3,273 mi), longer than the width of the Atlantic Ocean. He had escort boats that were prepared to pour blood into the river to distract meat-eating fish such as piranhas.

In 2007, the Nile had been proposed as his next river, but Strel said, "I am not going to do the Nile. It's long but not challenging enough, it is just a small creek. The Amazon is much more mighty."

He plans to swim across Lake Arenal on 29 September 2010 as part of his visit to an environmentalist international film festival in Costa Rica. He plans to swim about 6 kilometres from shore and then back to his starting point.

In June 2011 Strel completed his Colorado River Swim challenge for the documentary Stan Lee's Superhumans.

Achievements by year:

- 2008: Sognefjord, Norway; Loch Ness, UK
- 2009: Doha, Qatar; River Thames, UK; River Cam, UK
- 2010: Grand Canyon, Arizona, US; Lake Mead, Nevada/Arizona, US
- 2011: Lake Ontario, Canada; Lake Simcoe, Canada; Lake Arenal, Costa Rica; San Juan River, Costa Rica
- 2012: Saguaro Lake, Arizona, US; Canyon Lake, Arizona, US; Apache Lake, Arizona, US Theodore Roosevelt Lake, Arizona, US
- 2013: Lake Powell, Arizona/Utah, US; Robben Island, South Africa
- 2014: Bondi Beach, Australia; Shelly Beach, Australia
- 2015: Lake Pleasant, Arizona, US; Tennessee River, Tennessee, US
- 2016: Rocky Point, Mexico; Alkhobar (Saudi Arabia) – Manamma (Bahrain)
- 2017: Manhattan, New York, US; Lake Wörth, Austria
- 2018: Alcatraz – Golden Gate Bridge, US
- 2019: Farallon Islands, California, US
- 2020: San Diego River, California, US
- 2021: Mura River, Slovenia

== Big River Man ==
Strel was the subject and star of a feature documentary entitled Big River Man directed by the acclaimed art-house director John Maringouin. The film, which won the "World Cinema Cinematography Award: Documentary" at the 2009 Sundance Film Festival, was critically praised for its blend of comedy and drama. The film chronicled Strel's 3,300 mile historic swim of the Amazon River.

== Strel Swimming Adventures ==
In 2010, Martin Strel and his son Borut Strel founded a company that offers swimming adventure holidays in the Mediterranean and at Lake Powell, Arizona. They currently offer swimming adventure holiday tours at Lake Powell, Arizona, in Slovenia (Lake Bled, Lake Bohinj, and the Soča River), on Croatia's Dalmatian coast swimming from island to island, in Montenegro exploring Adriatic fjords and coves, and cruising Mediterranean Turkey. Strel takes part in some trips.

== Global Center for Advanced Studies ==
In 2013, Martin Strel joined the faculty of The Global Center for Advanced Studies in its newly formed Institute of Adventure Studies.
