= John Maringouin =

American Film Director

- Born: September 2, 1973; New Orleans, Louisiana, U.S.
- Occupations: Film director, cinematographer, editor
- Years active: 2006–present
- Spouse: Molly Lynch

John Maringouin (born September 2, 1973) is an American film director from New Orleans, Louisiana.

== Biography ==
Maringouin's debut feature, Running Stumbled (2006), was a documentary film chronicling his return to his estranged father's home in Louisiana— his first visit in 25 years. Shot on digital video in 2002 he film found his father, Johnny, living in drug fueled chaos with his common-law wife Marie. The film premiered at the International Film Festival Rotterdam before screening at CineVegas. Time Out described it as part of "the fascinating, ever-expanding sub-genre of auto-archive documentary," placing it alongside Tarnation and Grizzly Man.

In 2006, Filmmaker Magazine selected Maringouin as one of their annual "25 New Faces of Independent Film," describing Running Stumbled as "a true epic in the fucked-up family doc genre."

Maringouin's second feature, Big River Man (2009), documented Slovenian endurance swimmer Martin Strel's attempt to swim the entire length of the Amazon River in 2007. The film followed Strel and his son and manager Borut as the expedition descended into physical and psychological extremity, with Strel losing his mind and nearly losing his life.

Maringouin's third feature as director, Ghostbox Cowboy (2018), was his first narrative fiction film. Starring David Zellner as a delusional entrepreneur pitching a ghost-communication device to Chinese investors, the film was shot in Shenzhen, China. The film premiered in the narrative competition at the 2018 Tribeca Film Festival. IONCINEMA called it "a no-frills Pynchonian mind-blowing masterpiece."

== Filmography ==
Year	Title	Role(s)
2006	Running Stumbled	Director, writer, editor
2009	Big River Man	Director, cinematographer, editor, producer
2011	Septien	Actor
2016	We Are X	Cinematographer, editor
2018	Ghostbox Cowboy	Director, writer, cinematographer, editor, producer

== Awards ==
Year	Award	Film	Result
2006	Independent Spirit Award nomination	Running Stumbled	Nominated
2006	Filmmaker Magazine 25 New Faces of Independent Film	—	Selected
2009	Sundance Film Festival Cinematography Award	Big River Man	Won
2010	Biografilm Festival Lancia Award	Big River Man	Won
2016	Sundance Film Festival Special Jury Award for Best Editing	We Are X	Won
