= Big River Man =

2009 film directed by John Maringouin

- Directed by: John Maringouin
- Written by: Molly Lynch; John Maringouin
- Produced by: Maria Florio; Molly Lynch; John Maringouin; Kevin Ragsdale; Roger M. Mayer; Molly Hassell
- Starring: Martin Strel; Borut Strel; Matthew Mohlke
- Cinematography: John Maringouin; Paul Marchand; James Clauer
- Music by: Rich Ragsdale
- Distributed by: IndiePix Films (US) (DVD); Planet Green us (TV)
- Release date: 16 January 2009 (Sundance Film Festival)
- Running time: 100 minutes
- Language: English
- Budget: $500,000

Big River Man is a 2009 documentary film directed by John Maringouin. It follows the Slovenian long-distance swimmer Martin Strel as he swims the entire 3,300 mile length of the Amazon River, between February and April 2007.

The film was nominated for the Grand Jury Prize at the 2009 Sundance Film Festival, won the World Cinema Excellence in Cinematography Award, and won the Lancia Award at the 6th Biografilm Festival in Bologna, Italy.

== Reception ==
Big River Man received widespread critical acclaim, holding a 90% approval rating on Rotten Tomatoes and a score of 68 on Metacritic indicating generally favorable reviews. Critics frequently compared the film to the work of Werner Herzog, with one reviewer describing it as "what might have happened if Werner Herzog had made Borat." The New York Post called it "compellingly cracked vérité," while another critic described it as "up there with the very best modern documentaries." The New York Times praised Maringouin's cinematography, writing that he "has a terrific eye: he brings you close to Mr. Strel, sometimes within panting distance, without forgetting the larger, lovelier world." One dissenting review came from Anthony Quinn of The Independent, who called the film "fuzzy and flaky."

== Soundtrack score ==
The score, composed by Rich Ragsdale, was nominated for Best Score at the 2009 Cinema Eye Honors. It was released in 2011 by 2ml records.
