= Hell on Heels: The Battle of Mary Kay =

2002 television film by Ed Gernon

- Film poster
- Written by: Patricia Resnick
- Directed by: Ed Gernon
- Starring: Shirley MacLaine; Shannen Doherty; Parker Posey
- Composer: Jonathan Goldsmith
- Countries of origin: Canada; United States
- Original language: English

Production
- Executive producers: Howard Meltzer; Peter Sussman; Ed Gernon
- Producer: Ian McDougall
- Cinematography: Steve Danyluk
- Editor: Harvey Rosenstock
- Running time: 97 minutes
- Production companies: Alliance Atlantis; TurtleBack Productions

Original release
- Network: CBS
- Release: October 6, 2002

Hell on Heels: The Battle of Mary Kay is a 2002 biographical comedy-drama television film directed by Ed Gernon (in his directorial debut) and written by Patricia Resnick. It stars Shirley MacLaine, Shannen Doherty, and Parker Posey. The film is based on the true story of a corporate war in the mid-1990s between cosmetics queen Mary Kay Ash and an ambitious newcomer, Jinger Heath, who launches a rival company.

A co-production between Canada and the United States, the film premiered on CBS on October 6, 2002. Both MacLaine and Posey received Golden Globe nominations for their performances, with MacLaine saying the role of Mary Kay was one of her favorite characters.

== Summary ==
Cosmetics queen Mary Kay relates her rise to the top of the home-beauty industry to an inquiring reporter, never allowing an opportunity pass to emphasize how many doors she has opened for the working women of America. Ultimately, however, Mary Kay's predominance is threatened by a much younger rival, Jinger Heath, whose BeautiControl company takes an enormous bite out of Mary Kay's share of the market. Caught in the middle is a slightly off-center beauty named Lexy Wilcox.

== Cast ==
- Shirley MacLaine as Mary Kay
- Shannen Doherty as Lexy Wilcox
- Parker Posey as Jinger Heath
- R. H. Thomson as Richard Rogers
- Barry Flatman as Dick Heath
- Rachael Crawford as Annika Kern
- Dean McKenzie as Clifton Sanders
- Marnie McPhail as Brooke
- Rebecca Gibson as Tanya
- Catherine Fitch as Beverly
- Maggie Butterfield as Doris
- Terri Cherniak as Liz
- Marina Stephenson Kerr as Chris
- Rhiannon Benedict as Haley
- Paul Christie as Lexy's Husband
- Ned Vukovic as Andy (Doorman)
- Robert Huculak as BC Exec
- Jessica Burleson as BC Rep
- John Bluethner as Boss
- Toby Kennett as Butler

== Production ==
Patricia Resnick wrote the script and Alliance Atlantis executive Ed Gernon made his directorial debut on the film, which was co-produced with Howard Meltzer's TurtleBack Productions and Alliance Atlantis' Ian McDougall.

Principal photography took place in Winnipeg from July 3 to 28, 2002.

== Reception ==
=== Accolades ===
Year	Award	Category	Recipient	Result	Ref.
2003	60th Golden Globe Awards	Best Actress in a Miniseries or Motion Picture Made for Television	Shirley MacLaine	Nominated	
2003	60th Golden Globe Awards	Best Supporting Actress in a Series, Miniseries or Motion Picture Made for Television	Parker Posey	Nominated	
2003	2nd AARP Movies for Grownups Awards	Best TV Movie	Hell on Heels: The Battle of Mary Kay	Won	
