= Golden Globe Award for Best Supporting Actress – Series, Miniseries or Television Film =

American acting award

Golden Globe Award for Best Supporting Actress – Series, Miniseries, or Television Film
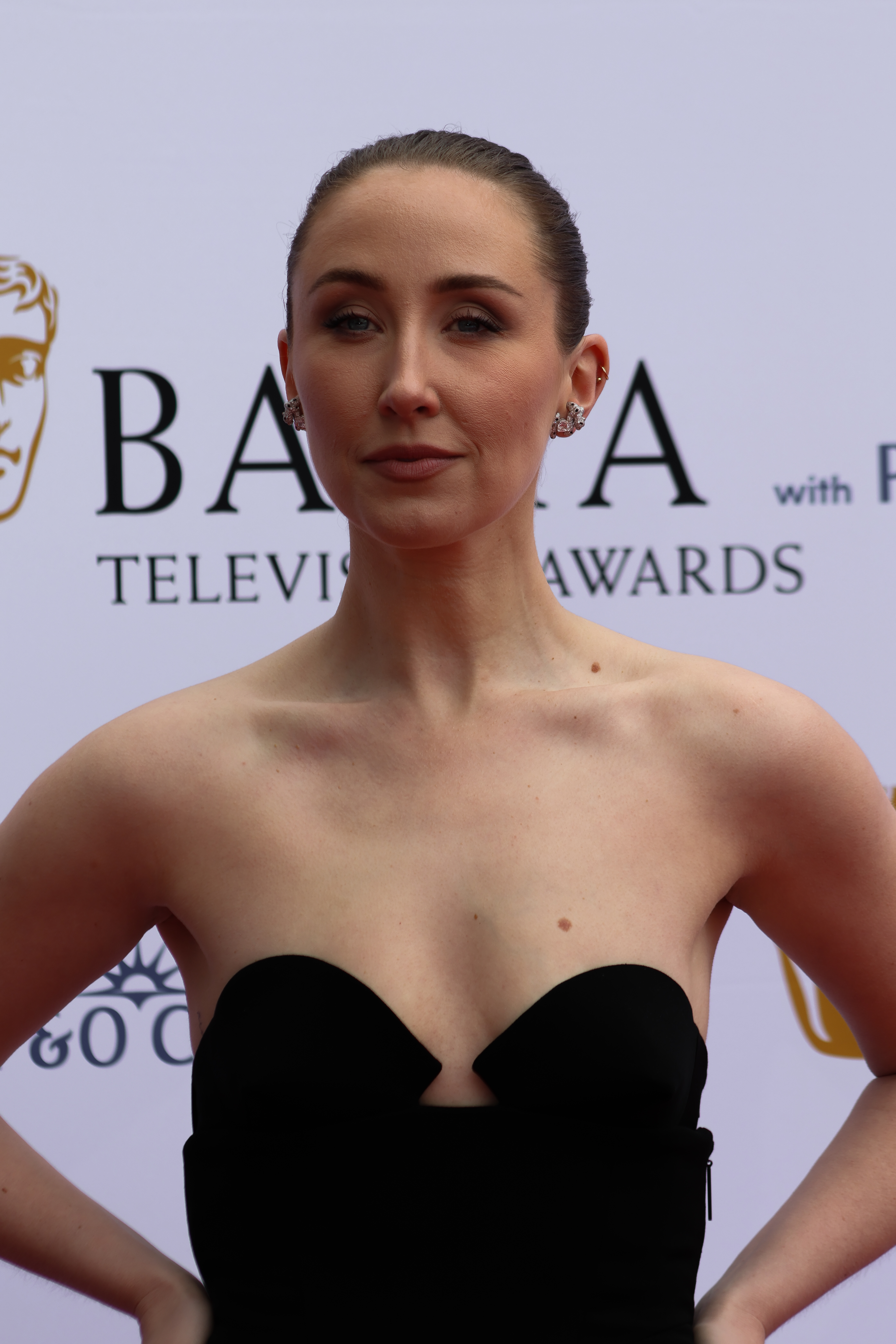
- The 2025 recipient: Erin Doherty
- Awarded for: Best Performance by an Actress in a Supporting Role in a Series, Miniseries, or Television Film
- Country: United States
- Presented by: Hollywood Foreign Press Association
- First award: February 5, 1971
- Currently held by: Erin Doherty, Adolescence (2025)

Highlights
- Most awards: Valerie Bertinelli; Laura Dern; Faye Dunaway; Polly Holliday (2)
- Most nominations: Rhea Perlman (6)
- Website: goldenglobes.com

The Golden Globe Award for Best Supporting Actress – Series, Miniseries, or Television Film is an award presented annually by the Hollywood Foreign Press Association (HFPA). It is the Golden Globe Award given in honor of an actress who has delivered an outstanding performance in a supporting role on a television series, miniseries or motion picture made for television for the calendar year. The award was first presented at the 28th Golden Globe Awards on February 5, 1971, to Gail Fisher for her role in Mannix. It was presented under the title Best Supporting Actress – Television Series before changing to its current title in 1980. For the 80th Golden Globe Awards, the category was split into two categories: Comedy/Drama Series and Limited or Anthology Series or Television Film.

Since its inception, the award has been given to 56 actresses. Erin Doherty is the current recipient of the award for her portrayal of Briony Ariston in Adolescence. Valerie Bertinelli, Laura Dern, Faye Dunaway, and Polly Holliday have all won the most awards in this category with two each. Rhea Perlman has been nominated for the award on six occasions, the most within the category; she lost all six times.

== Winners and nominees ==
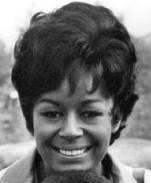
Gail Fisher was the first recipient in this category for Mannix (1970).

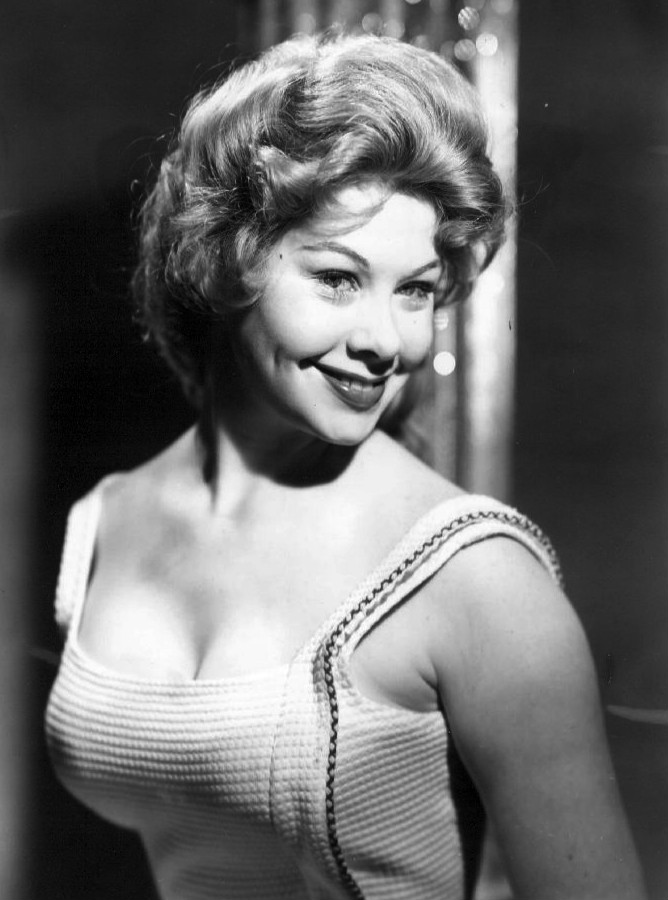
Sue Ane Langdon won for Arnie (1971).

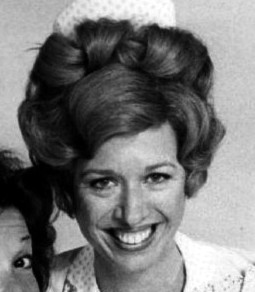
Polly Holliday won twice consecutively for Alice (1978, 1979).

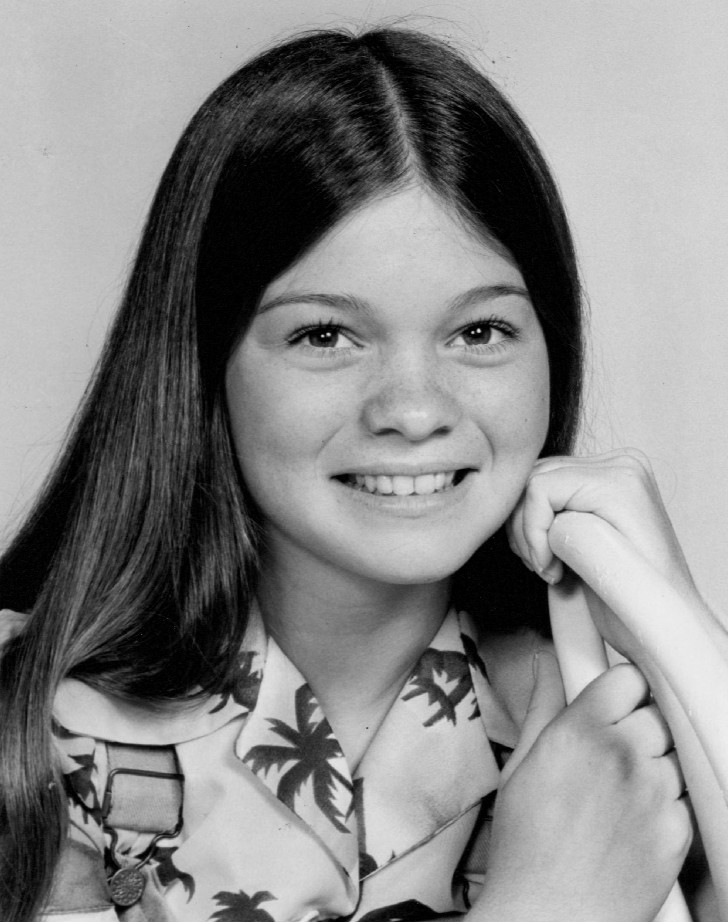
Valerie Bertinelli won twice consectively for One Day at a Time (1980, 1981).

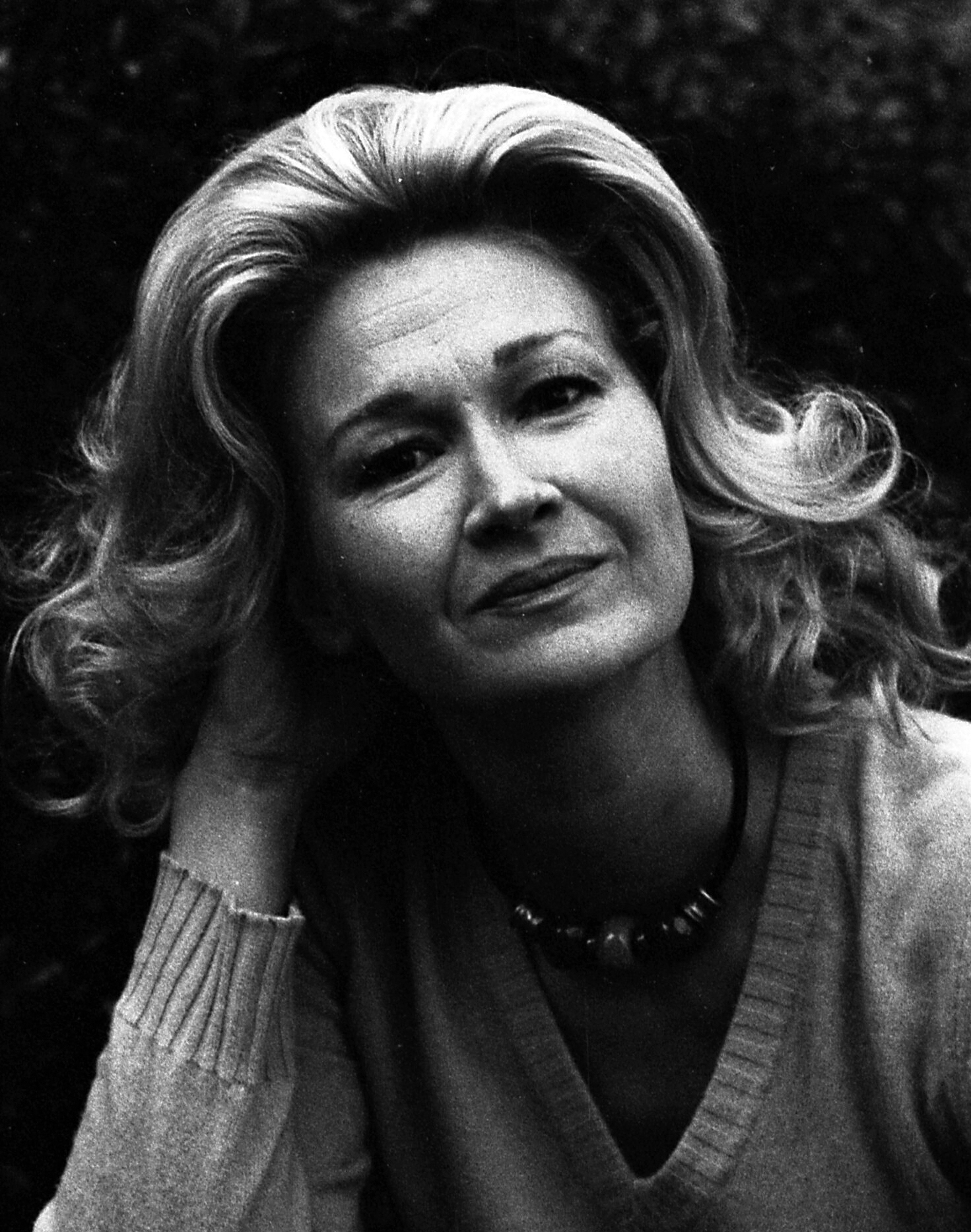
Diane Ladd won for Alice (1980).

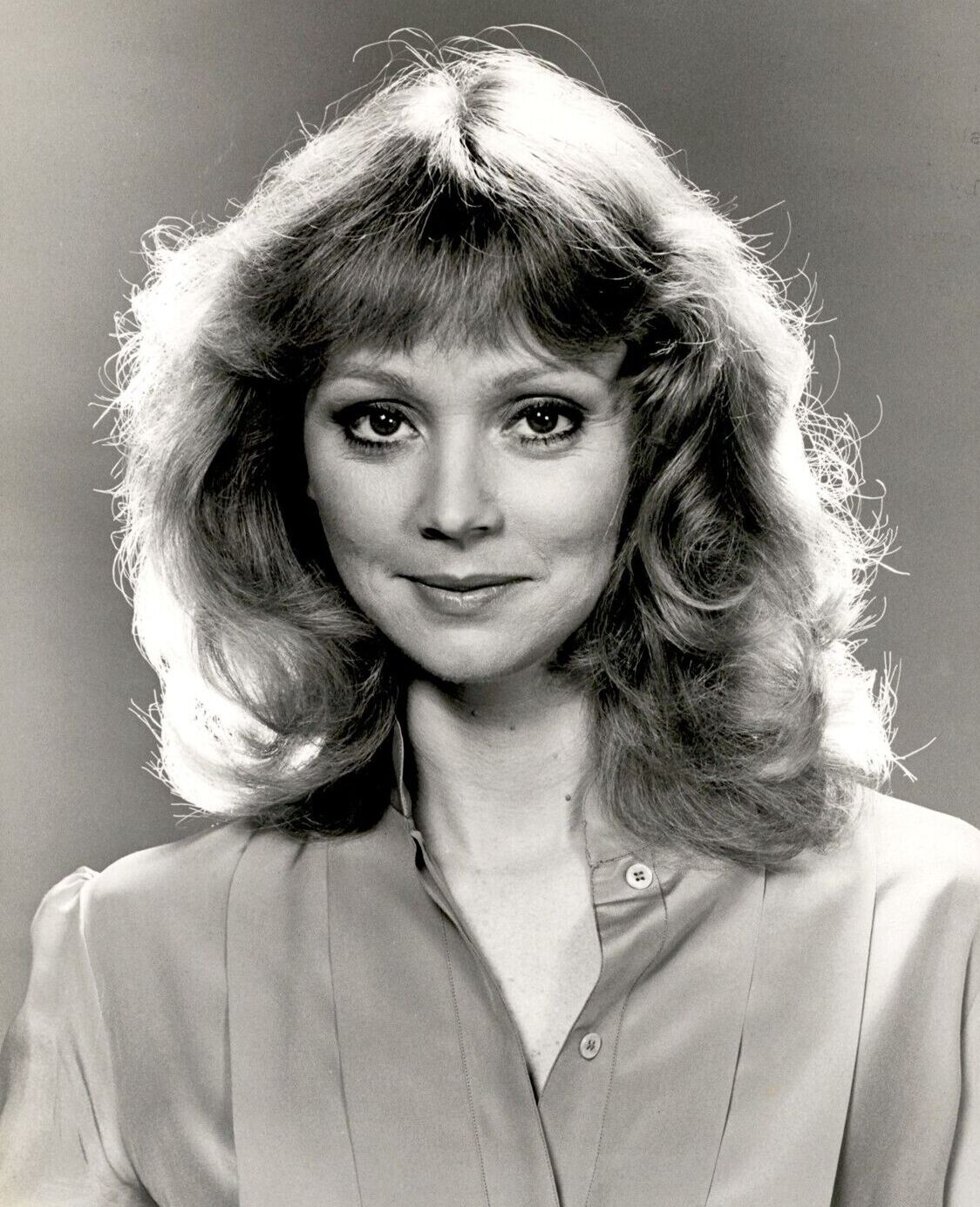
Shelley Long won for Cheers (1982).

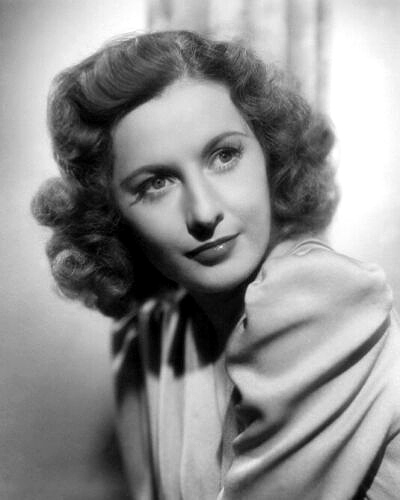
Barbara Stanwyck won for The Thorn Birds (1983).

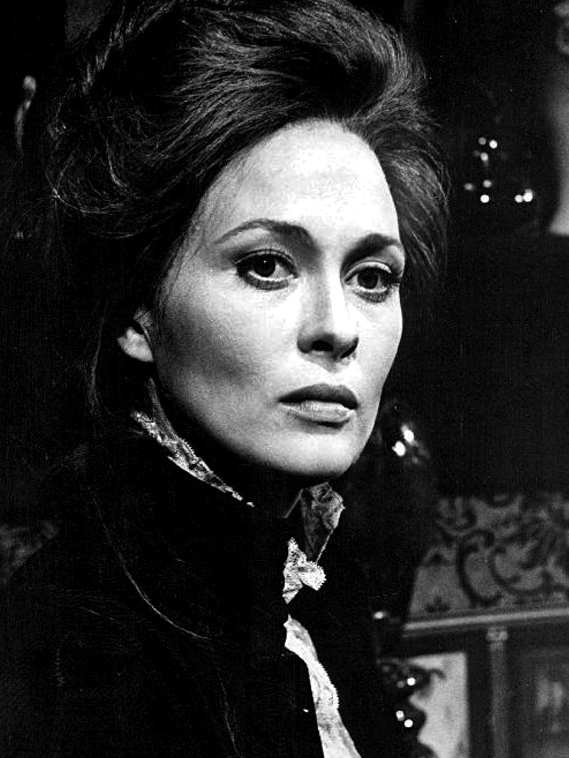
Faye Dunaway won twice for Ellis Island (1984) and Gia (1998).

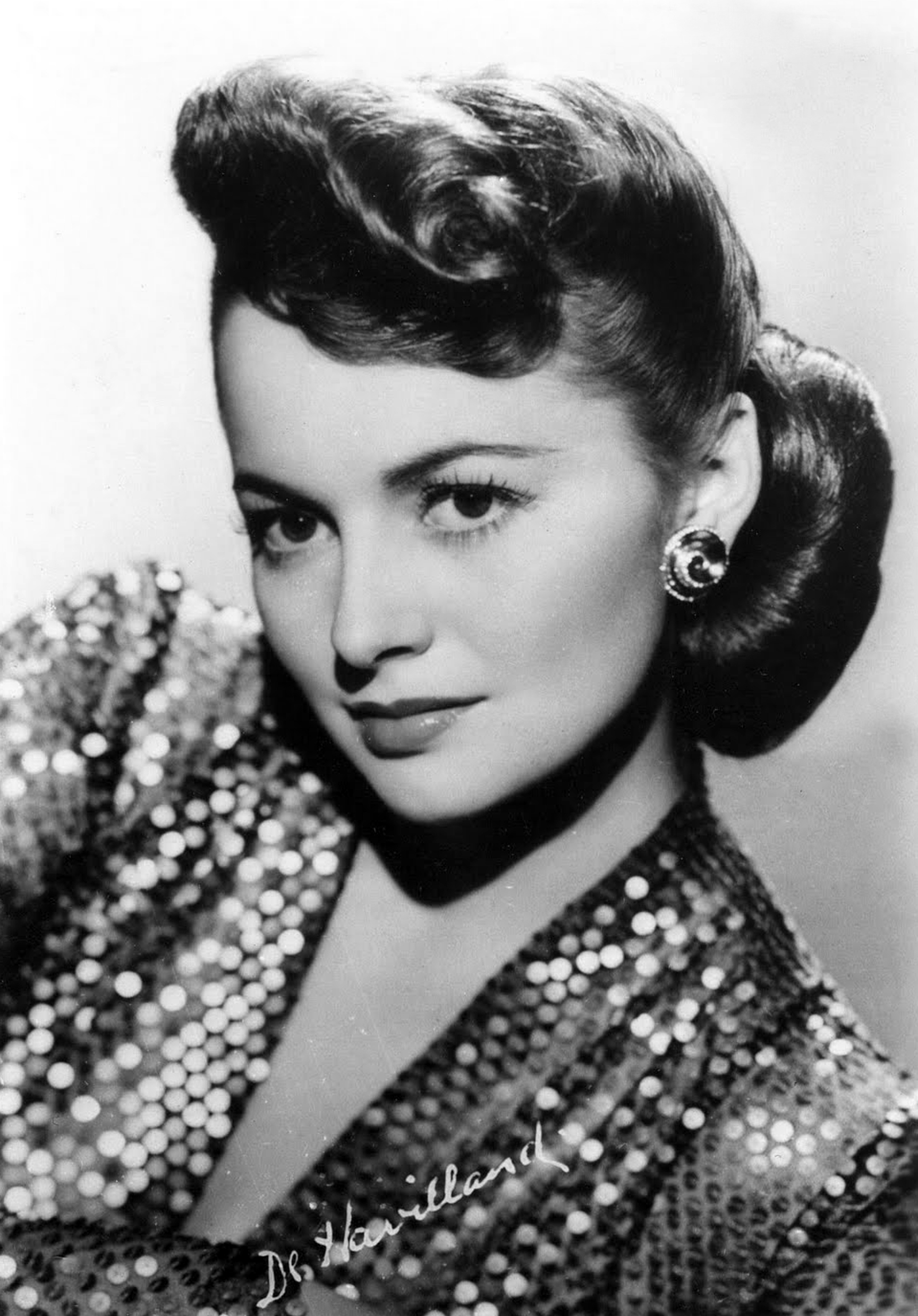
Olivia De Havilland won for Anastasia: The Mystery of Anna (1986).

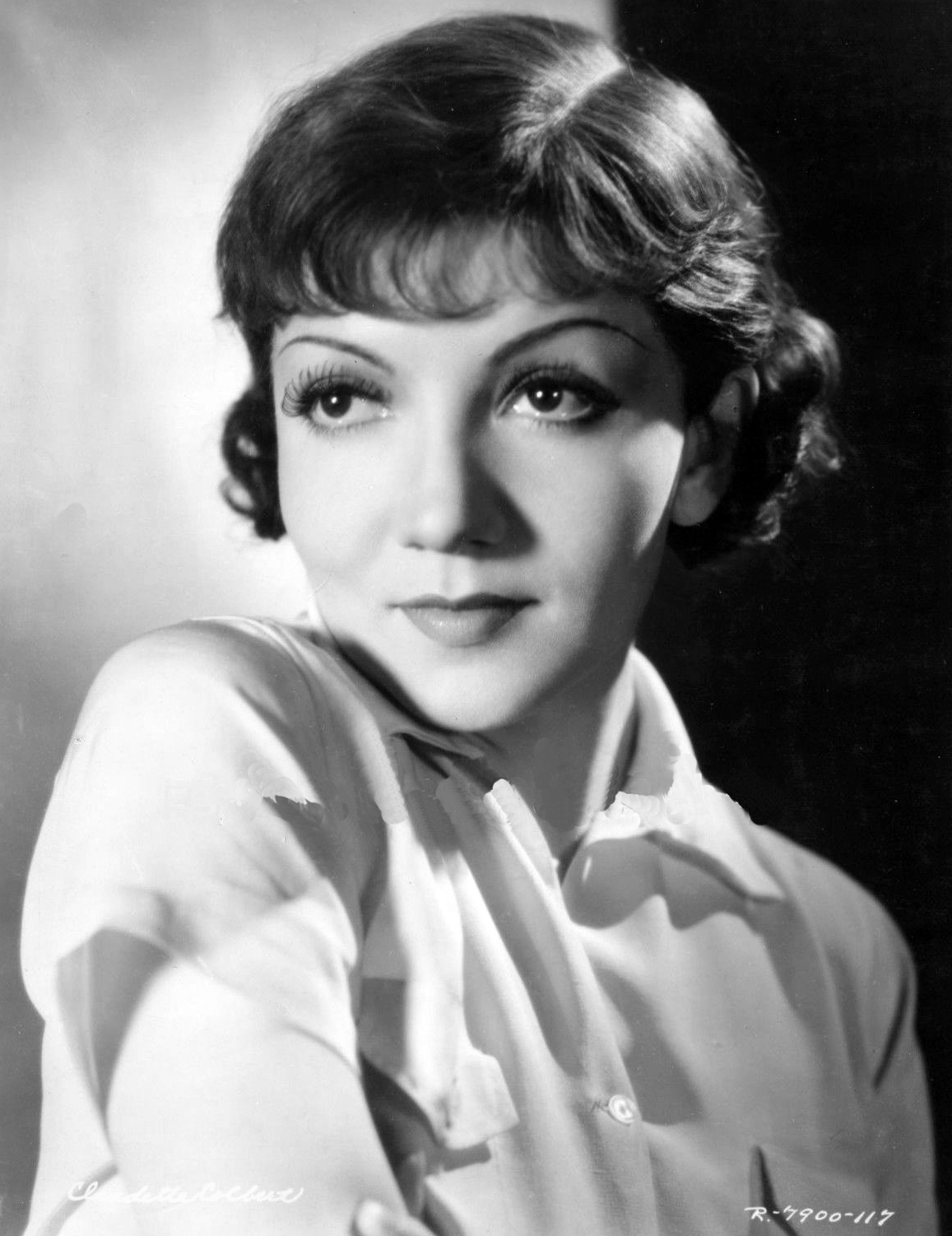
Claudette Colbert won for The Two Mrs. Grenvilles (1987).

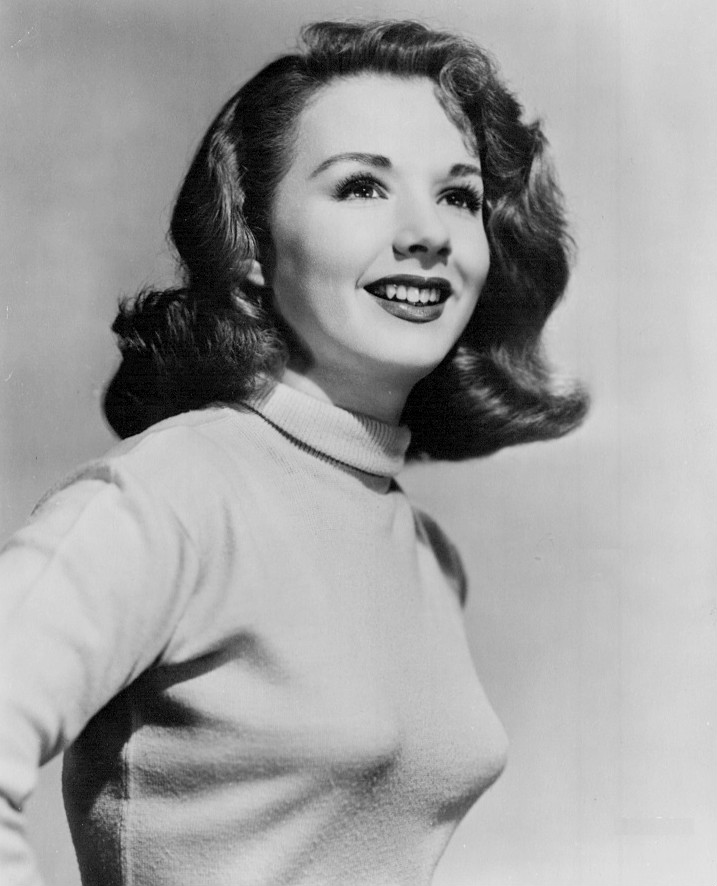
Piper Laurie won for Twin Peaks (1990).

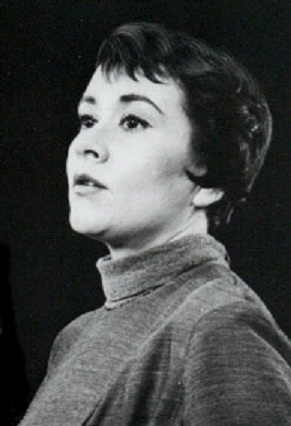
Joan Plowright won for Stalin (1992).

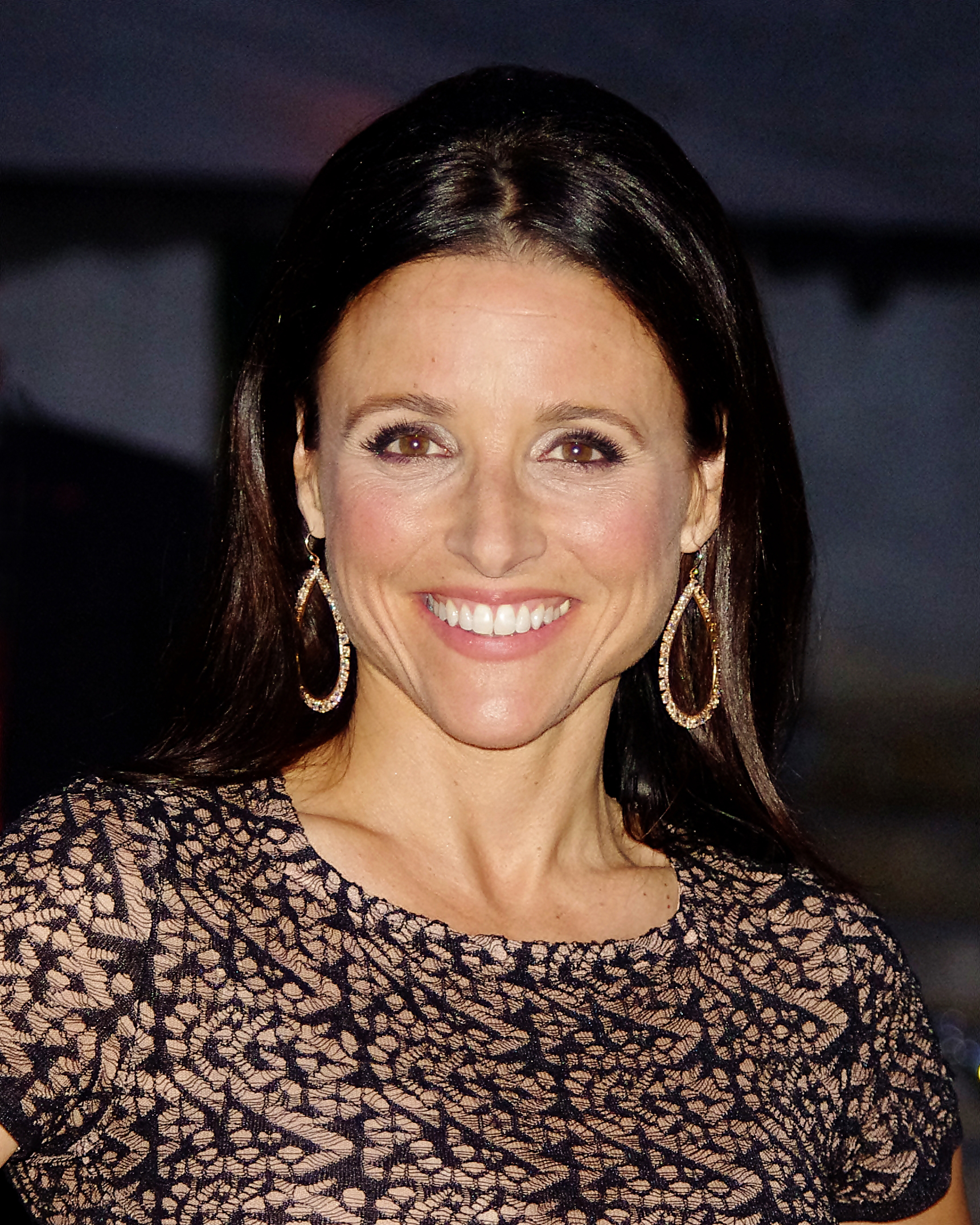
Julia Louis-Dreyfus won for Seinfeld (1993).

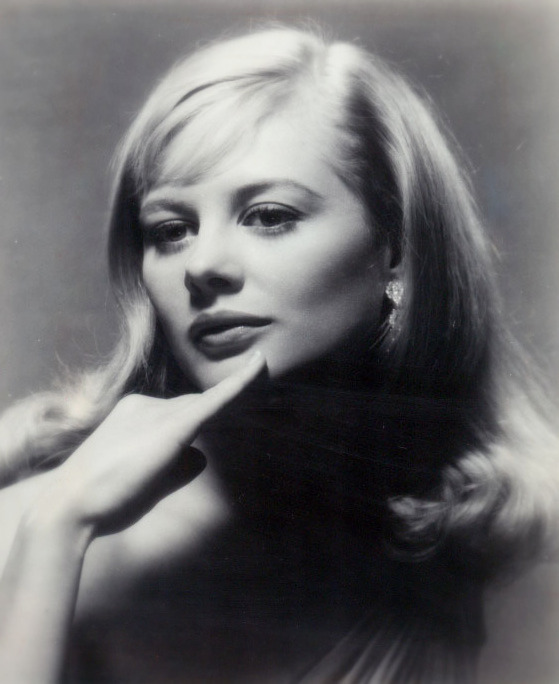
Shirley Knight won for Indictment: The McMartin Trial (1995).

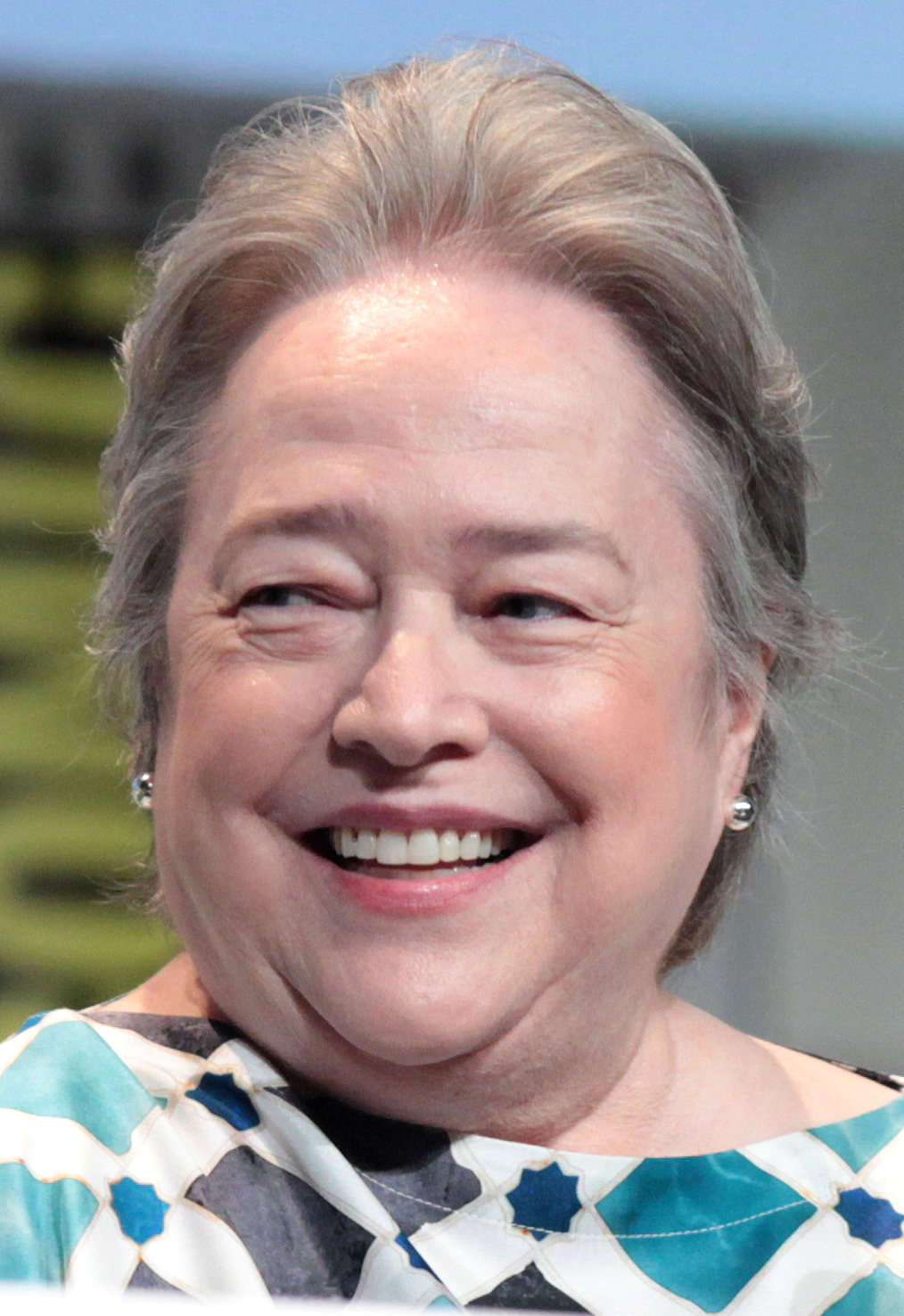
Kathy Bates won for The Late Shift (1996).

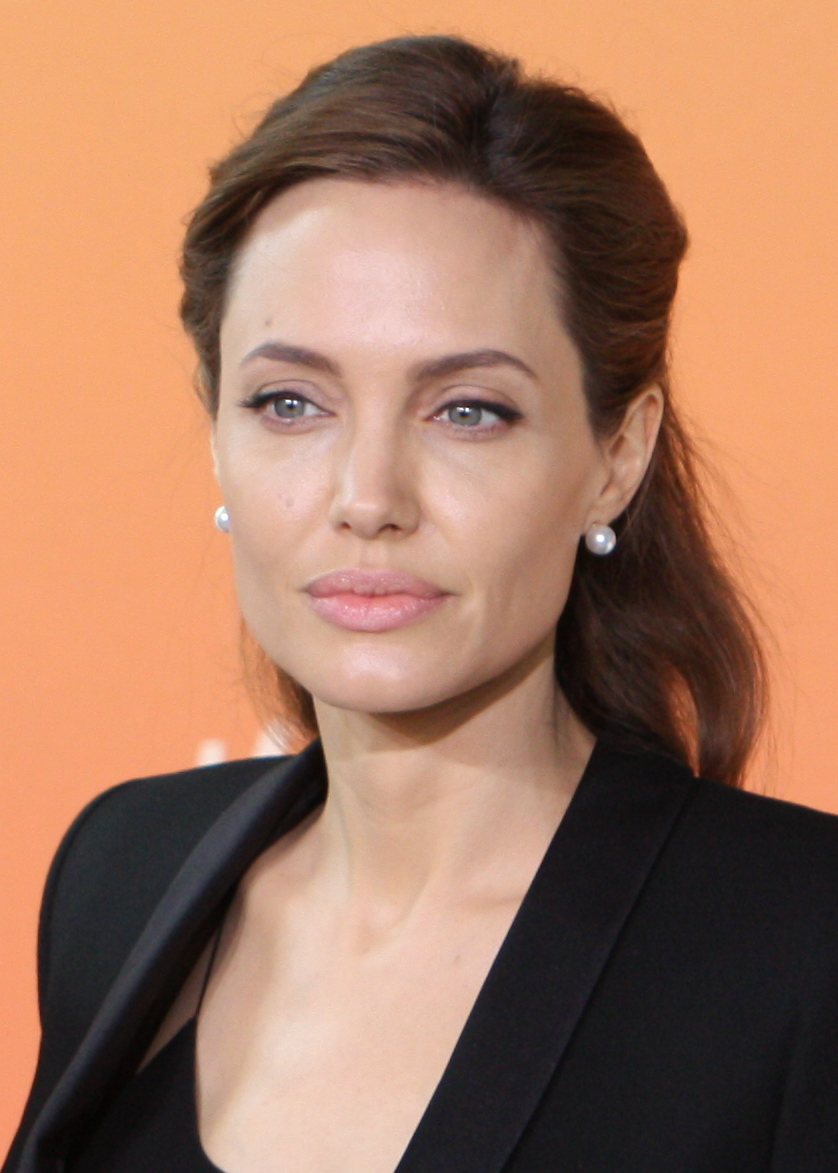
Angelina Jolie won for George Wallace (1997).

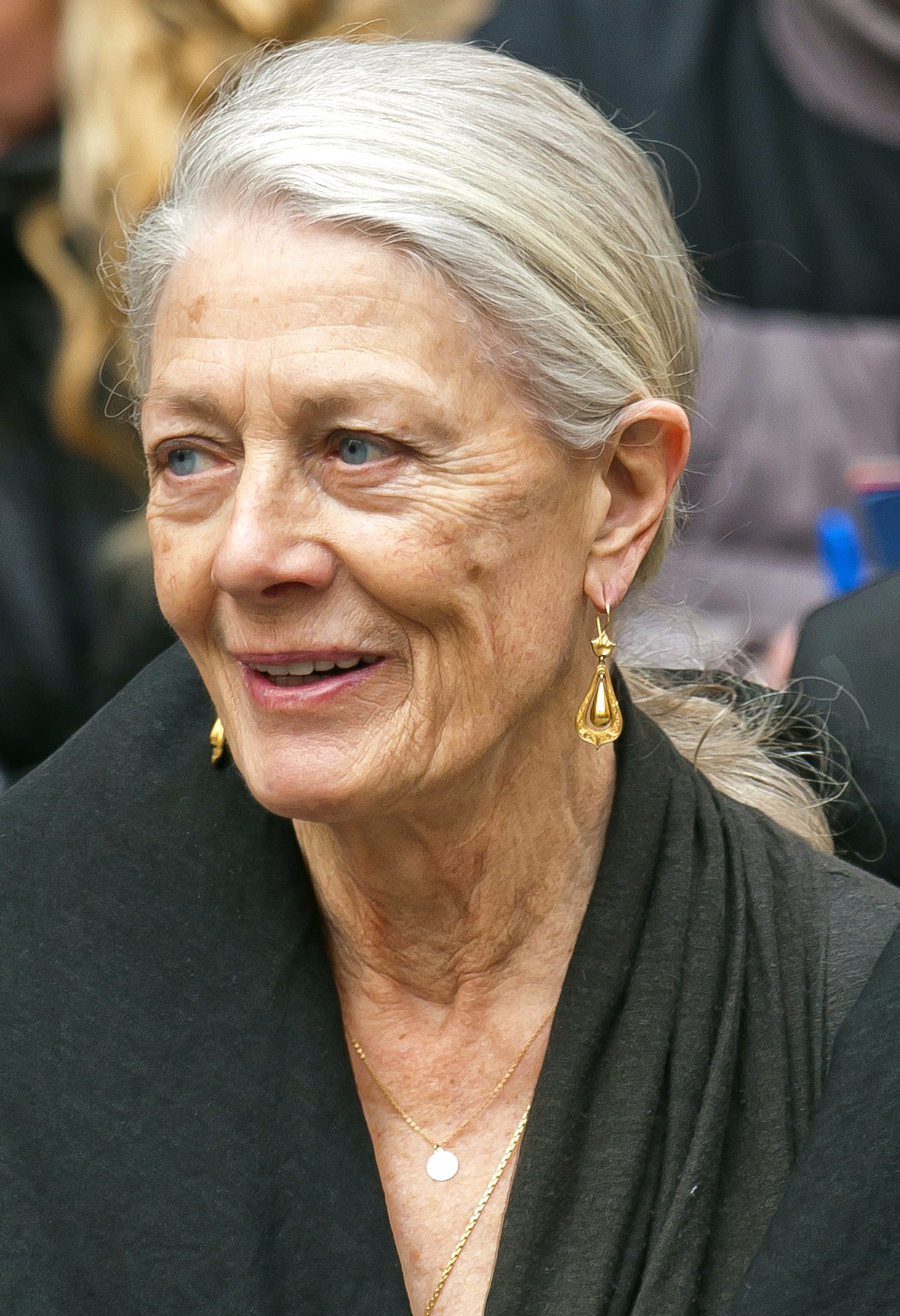
Vanessa Redgrave won for If These Walls Could Talk 2 (2000).

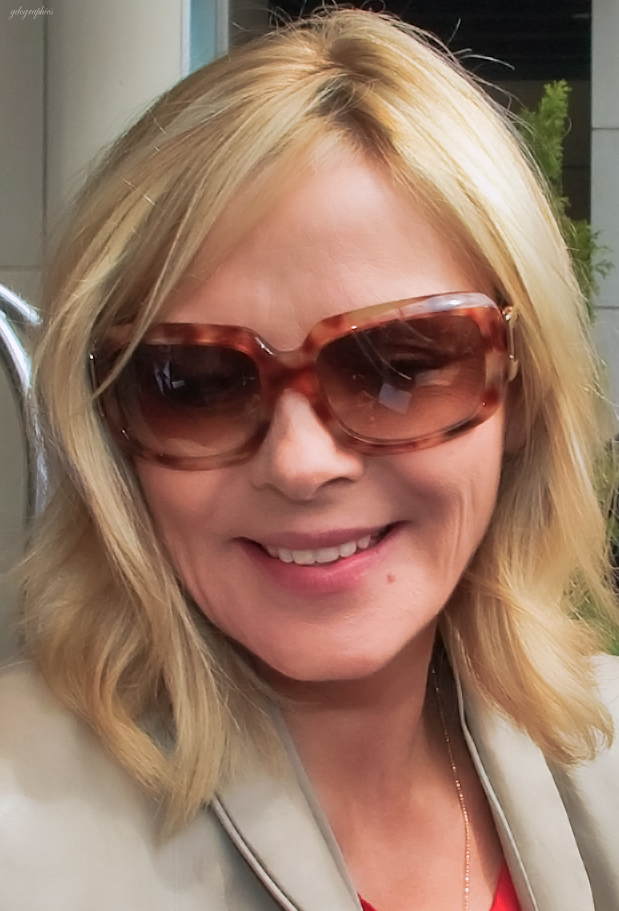
Kim Cattrall won for Sex and the City (2002).

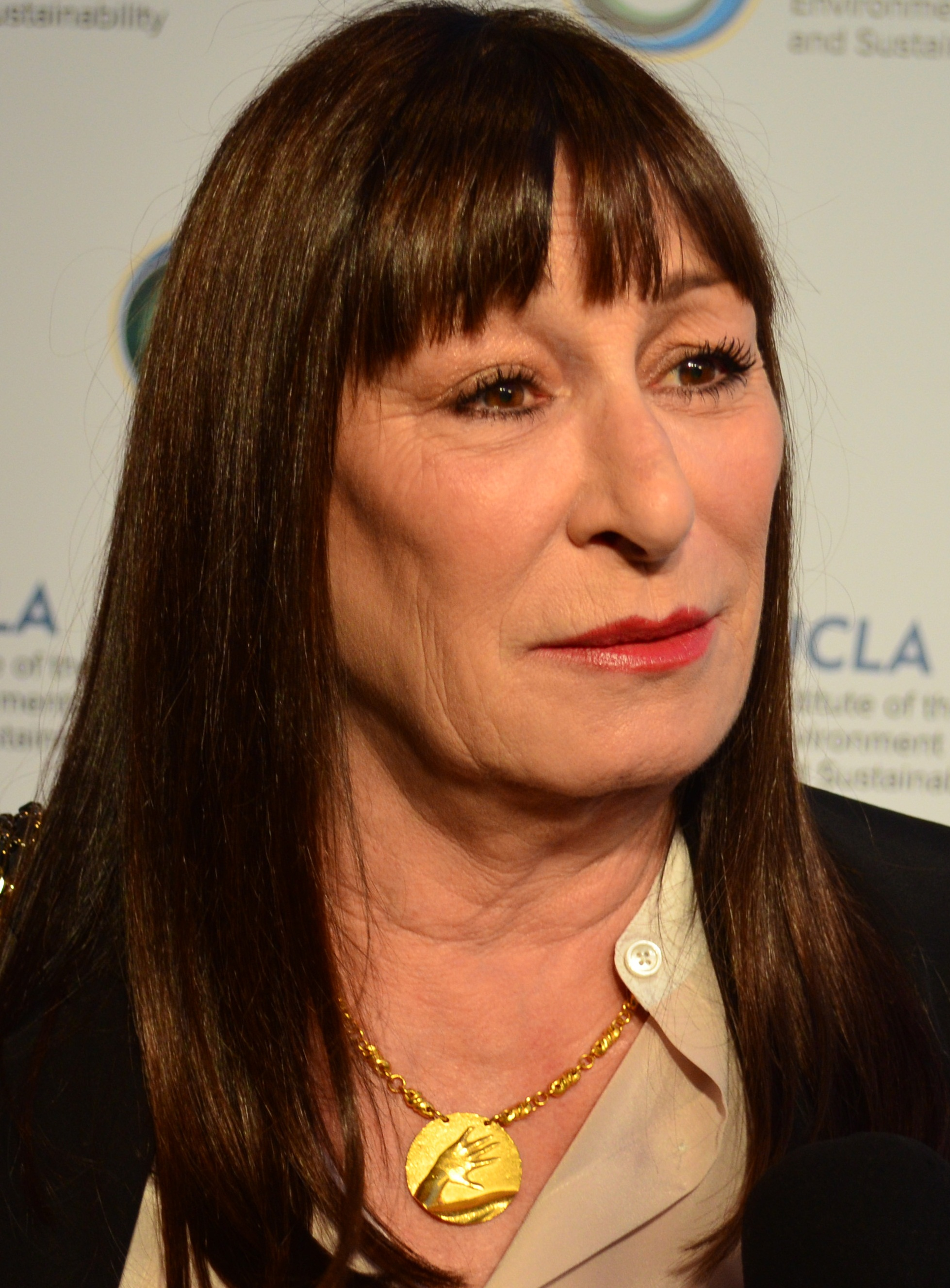
Anjelica Huston won for Iron Jawed Angels (2004).

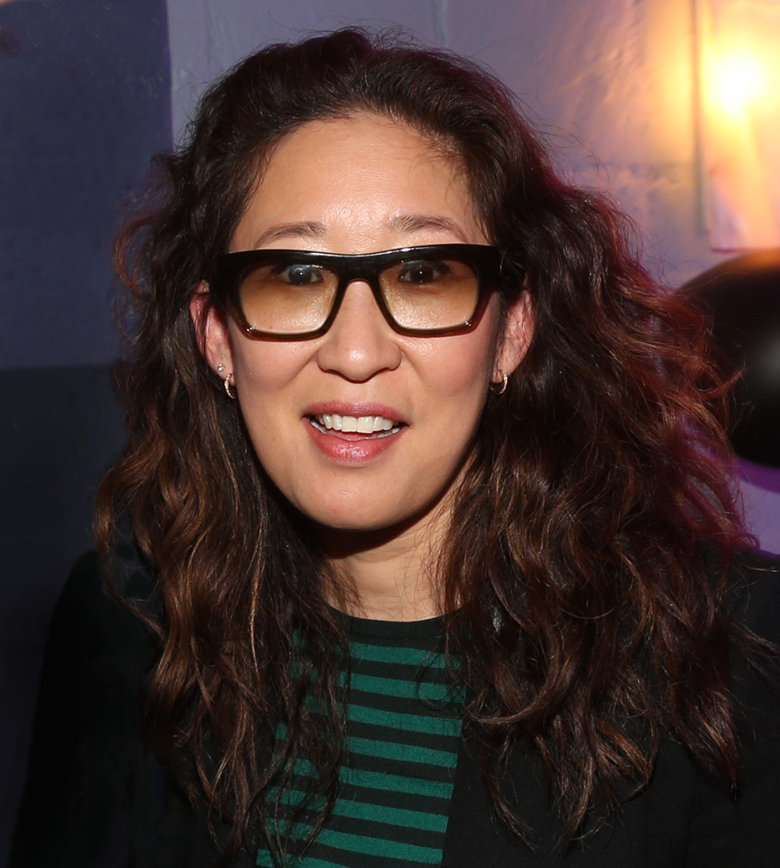
Sandra Oh won for Grey's Anatomy (2005).

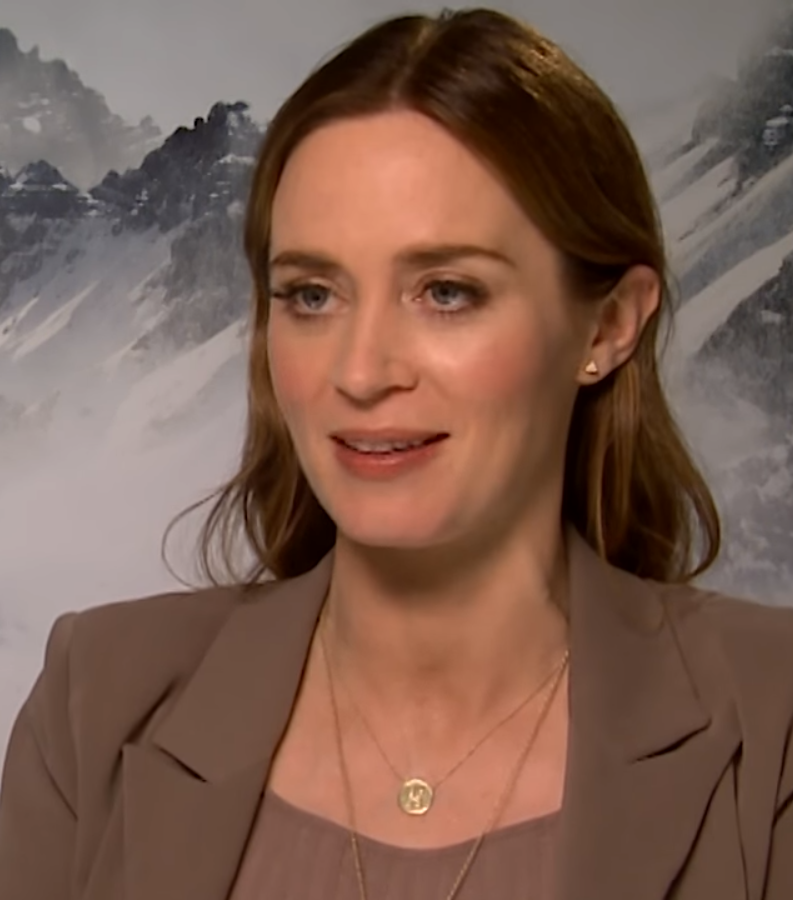
Emily Blunt won for Gideon's Daughter (2006).

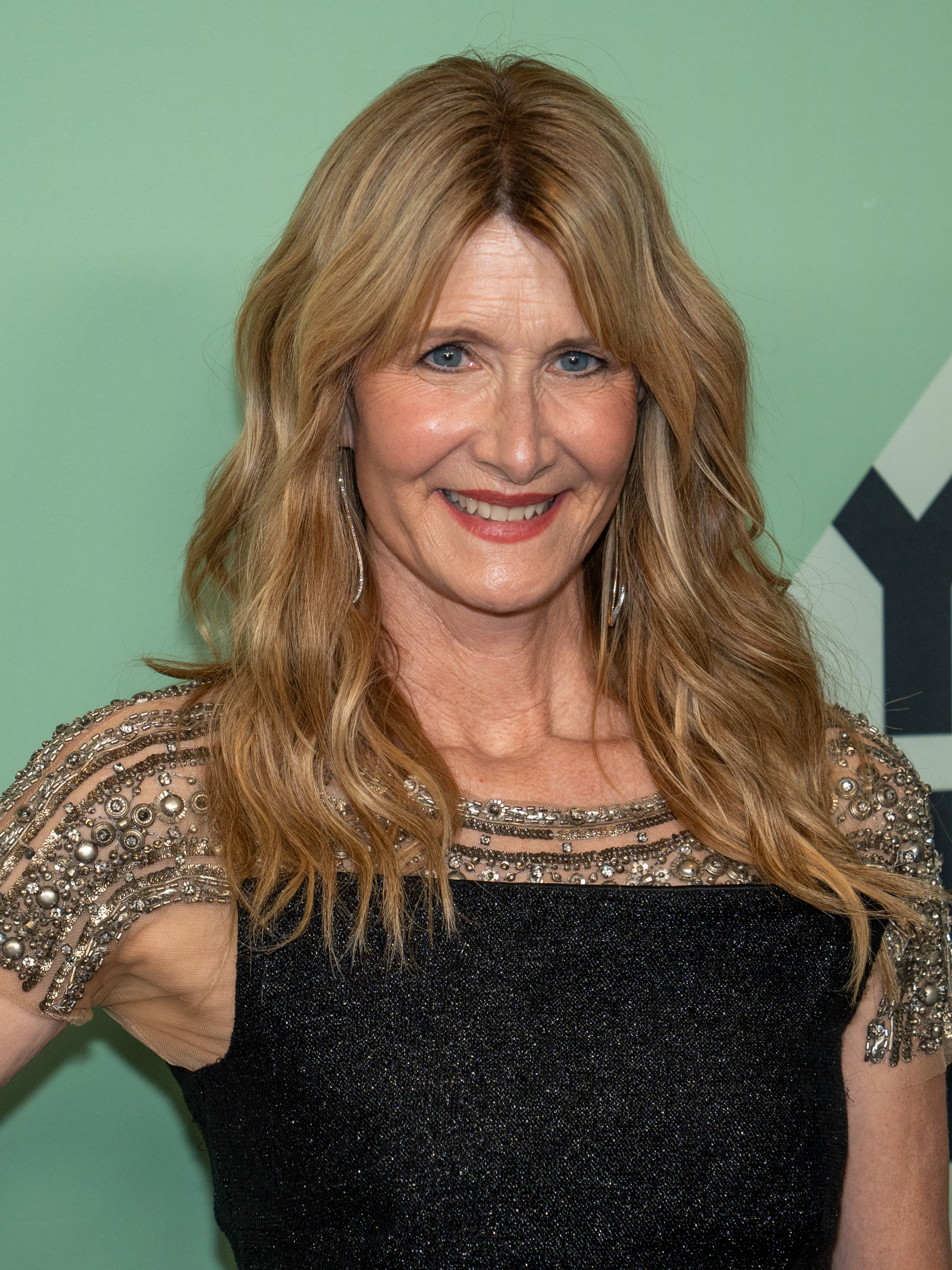
Laura Dern won twice for Recount (2008) and Big Little Lies (2017).

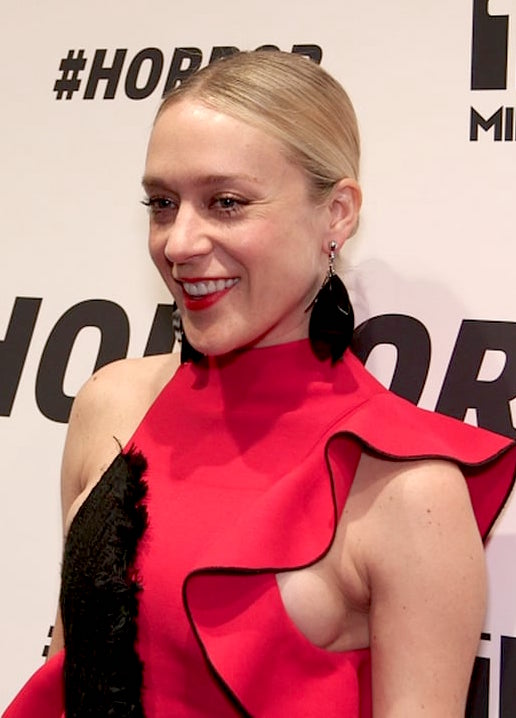
Chloë Sevigny won for Big Love (2009).

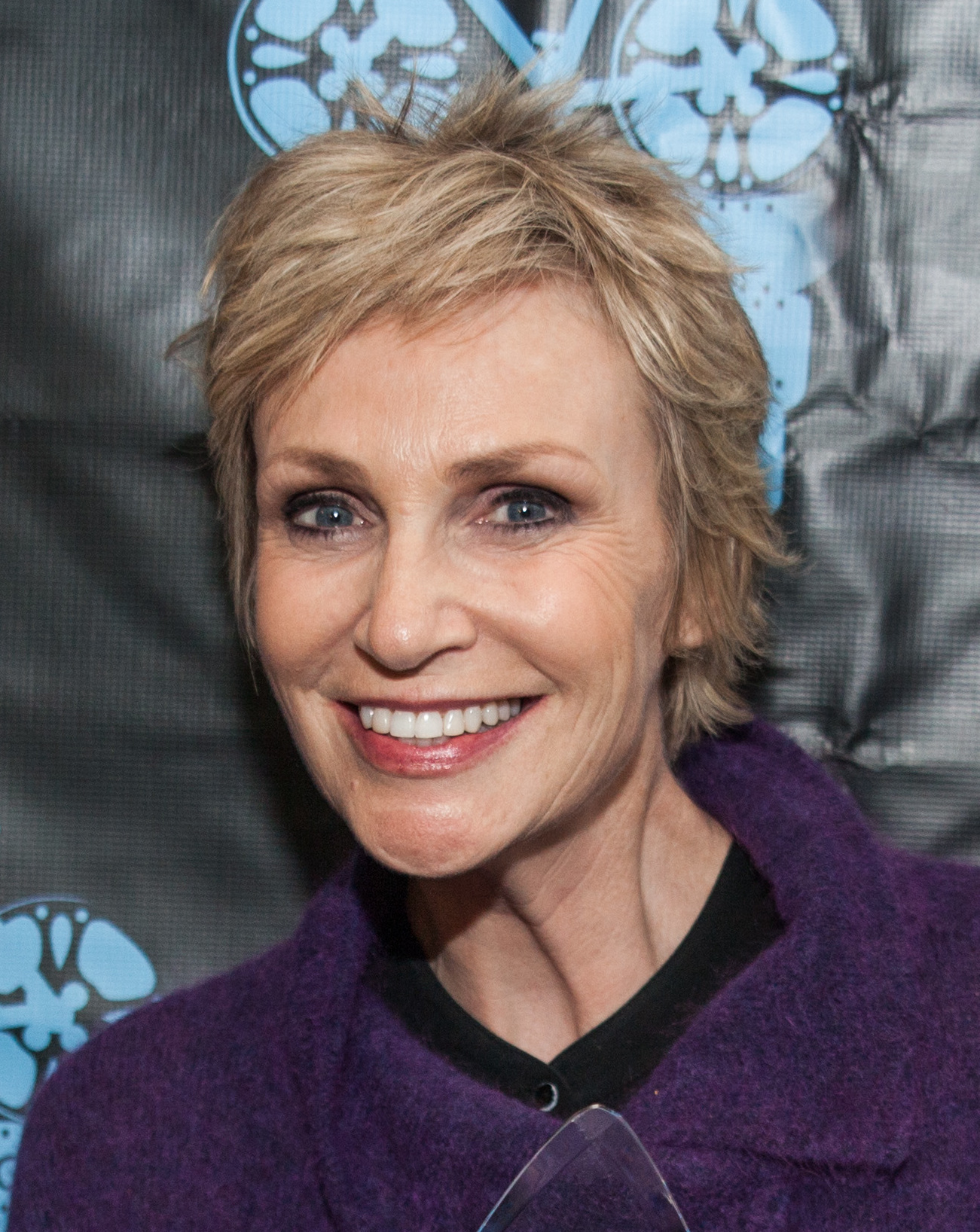
Jane Lynch won for Glee (2010).

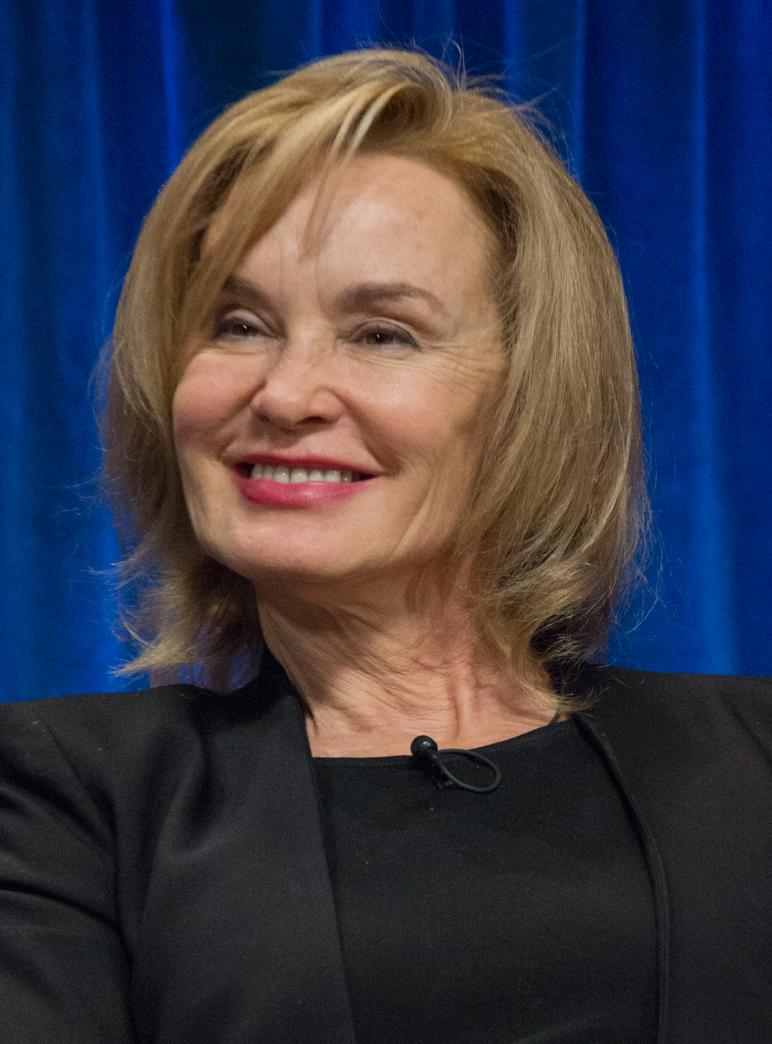
Jessica Lange won for American Horror Story: Murder House (2011).

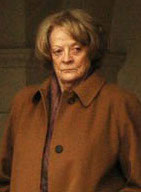
Dame Maggie Smith won for Downton Abbey (2012).

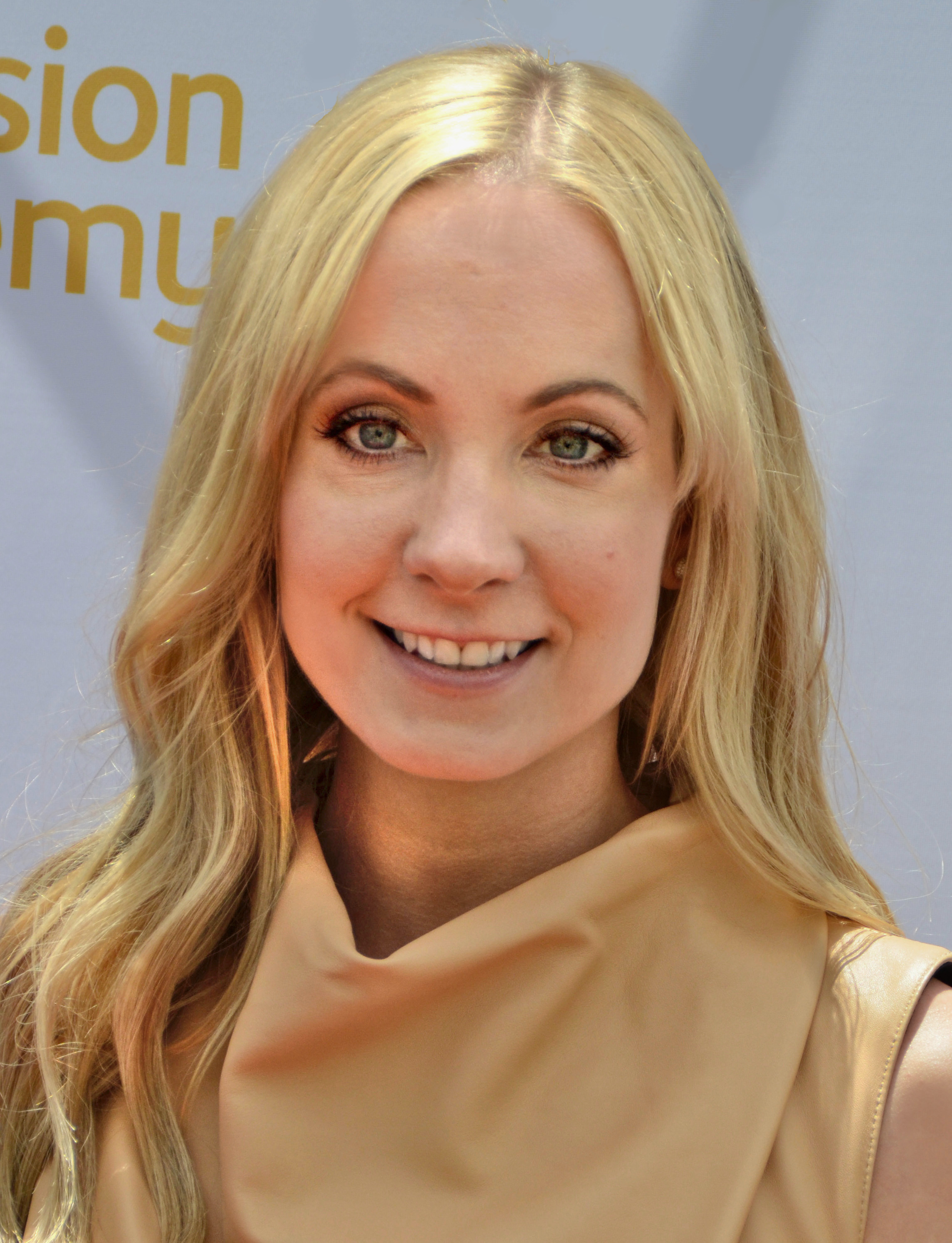
Joanne Froggatt won for Downton Abbey (2013).

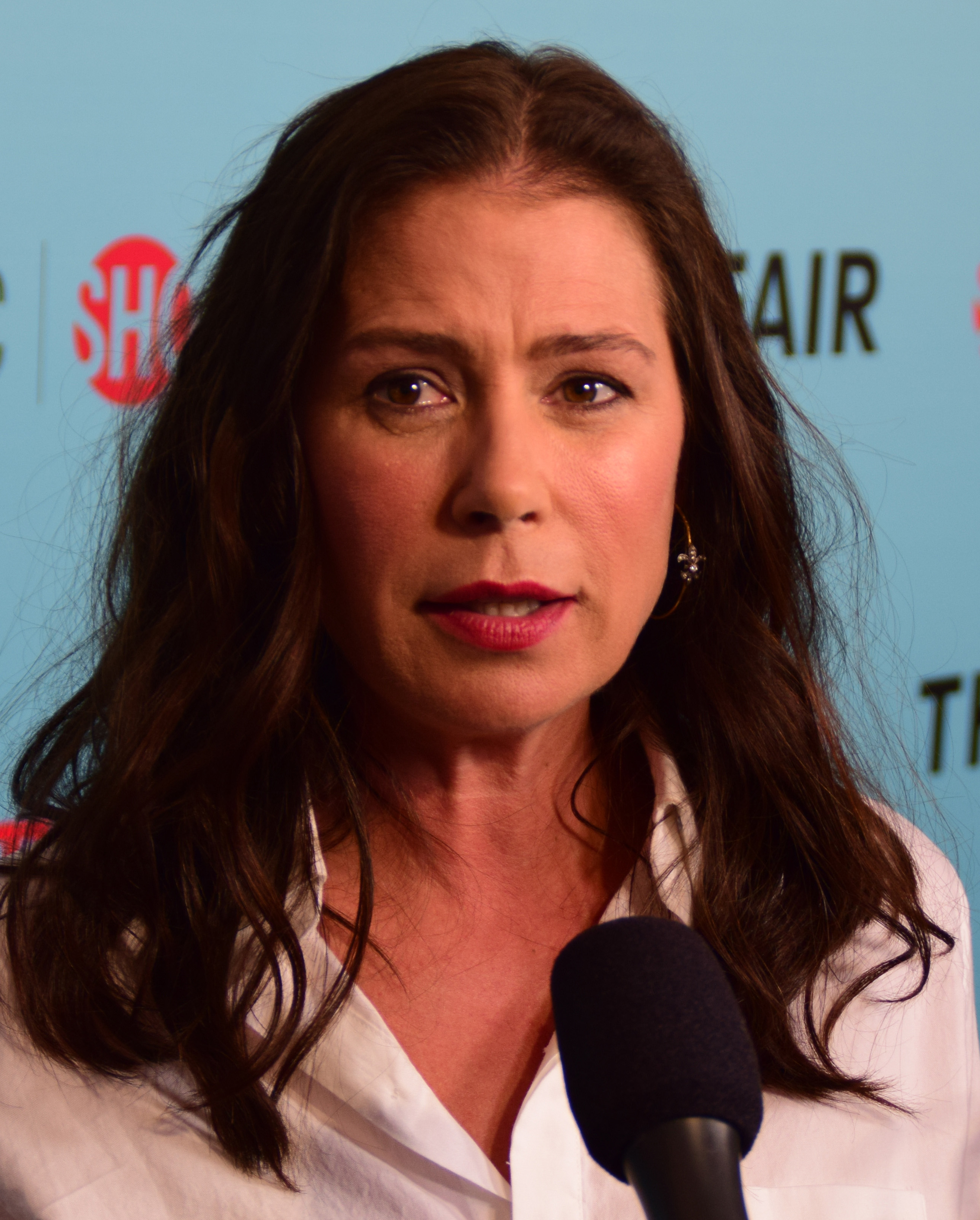
Maura Tierney won for The Affair (2015).

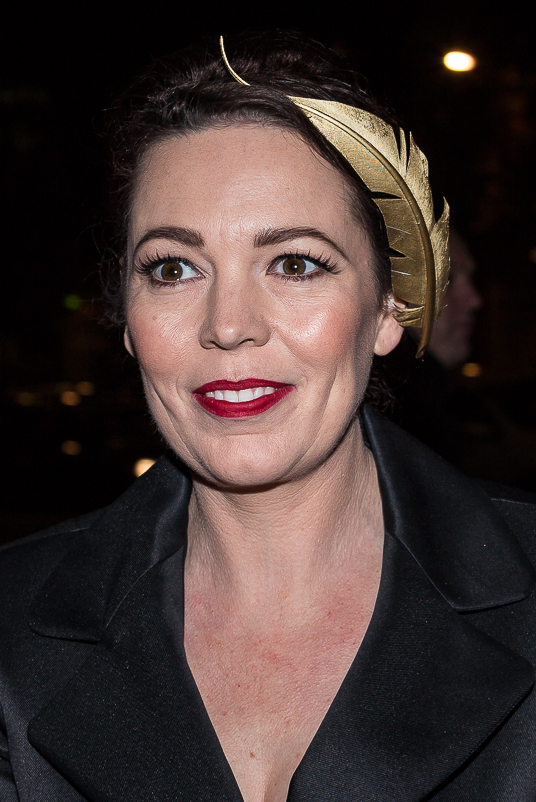
Olivia Colman won for The Night Manager (2016).

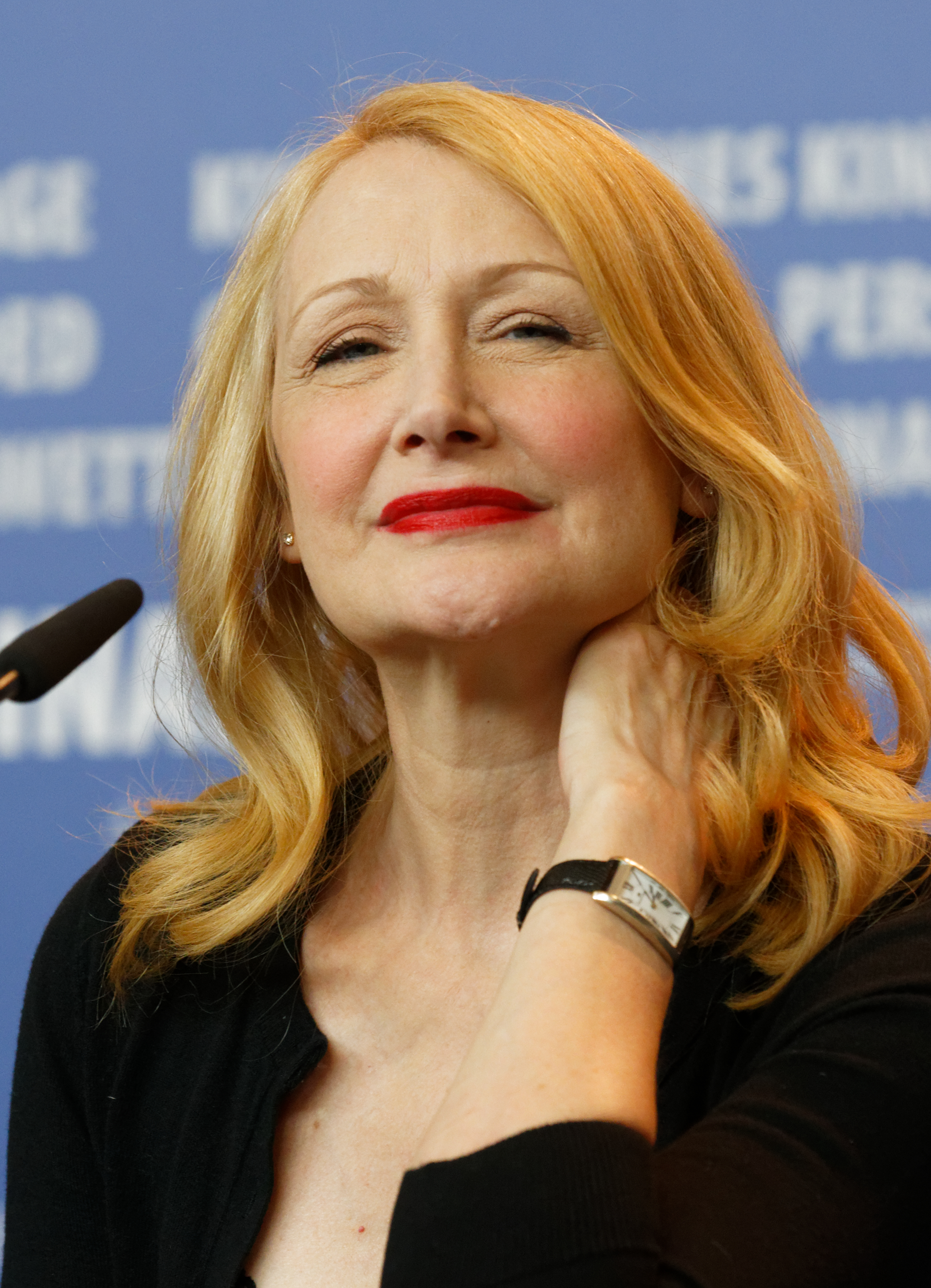
Patricia Clarkson won for Sharp Objects (2018).

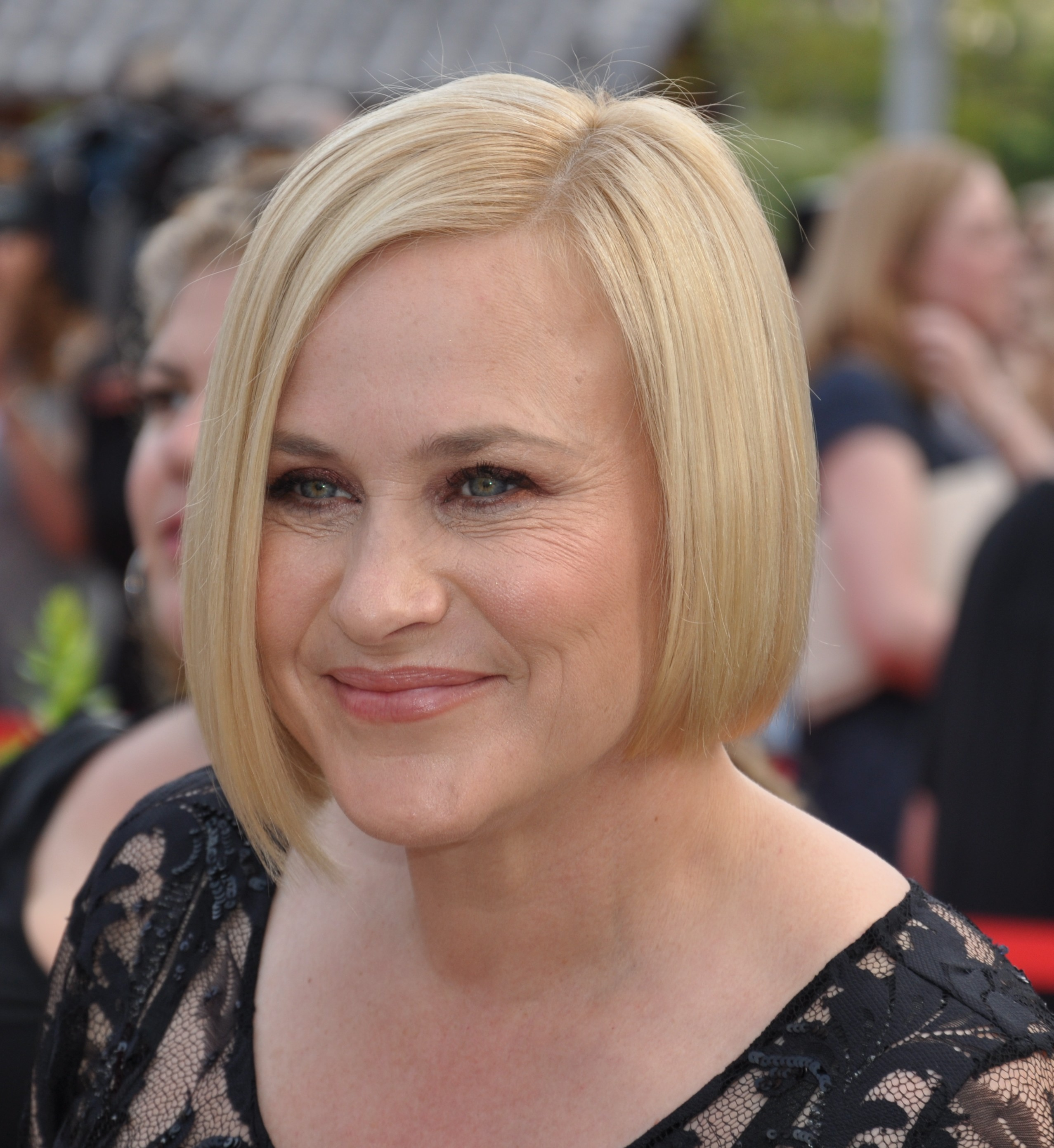
Patricia Arquette won for The Act (2019).

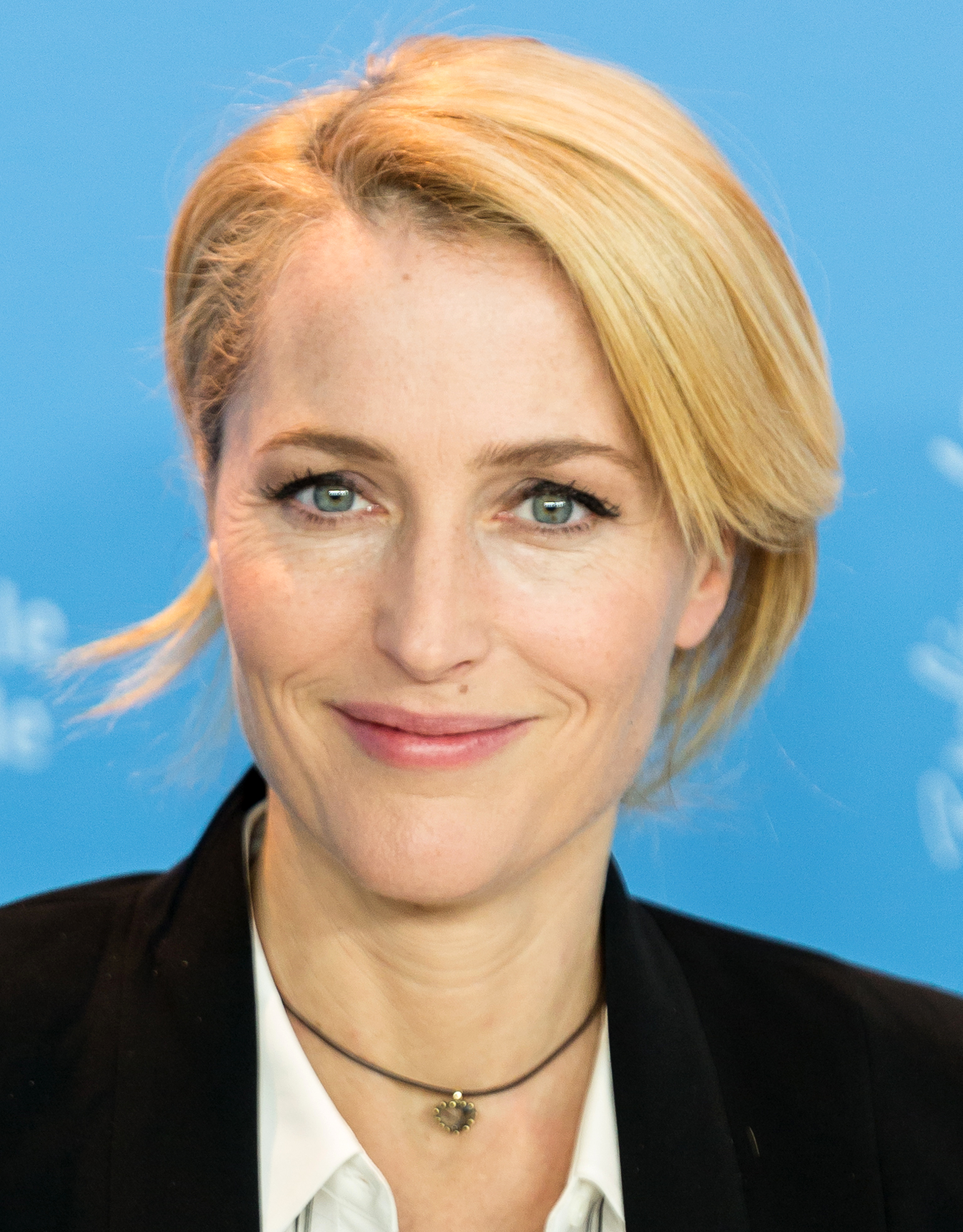
Gillian Anderson won for The Crown (2020).

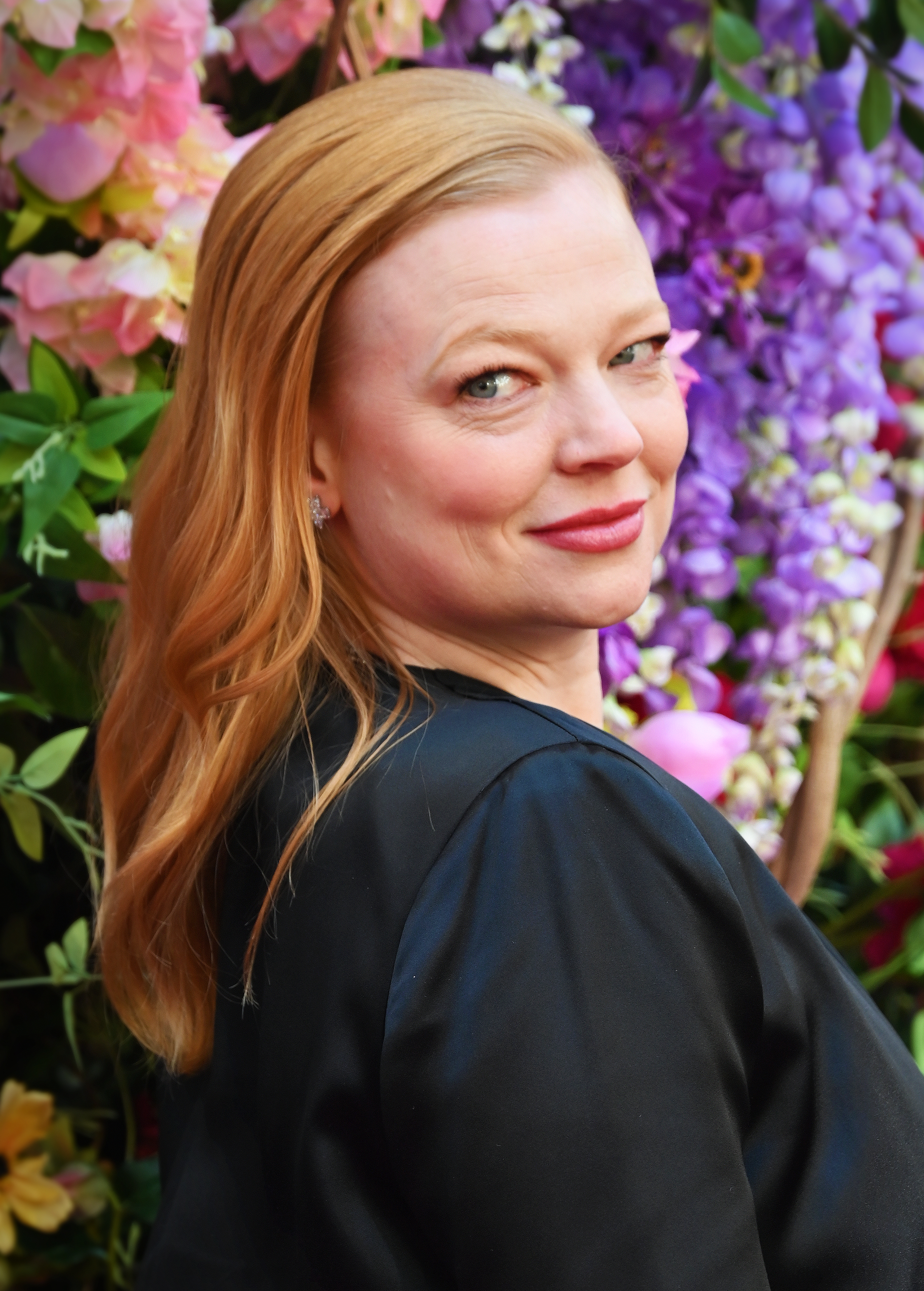
Sarah Snook won for Succession (2021).

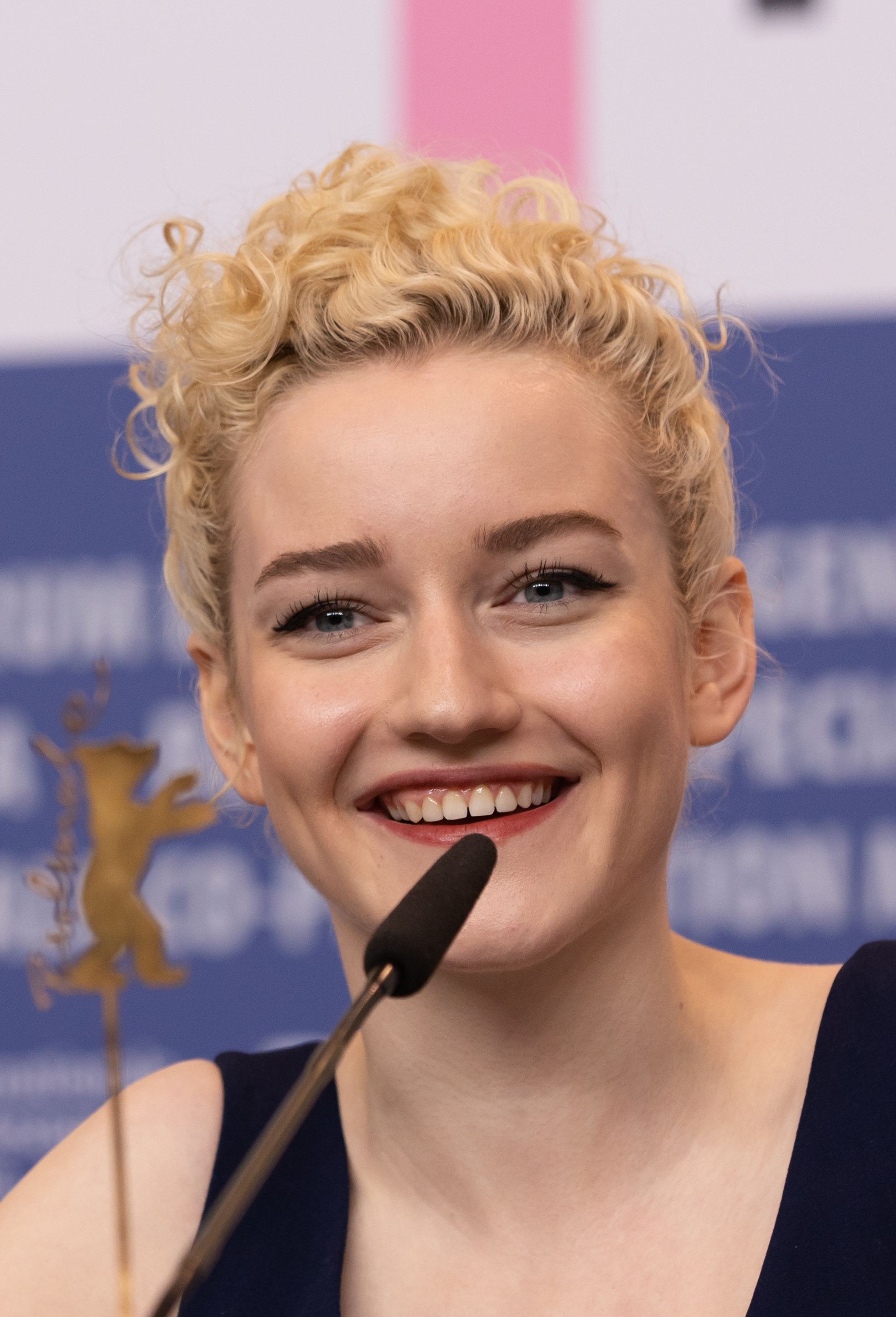
Julia Garner won for Ozark (2022).

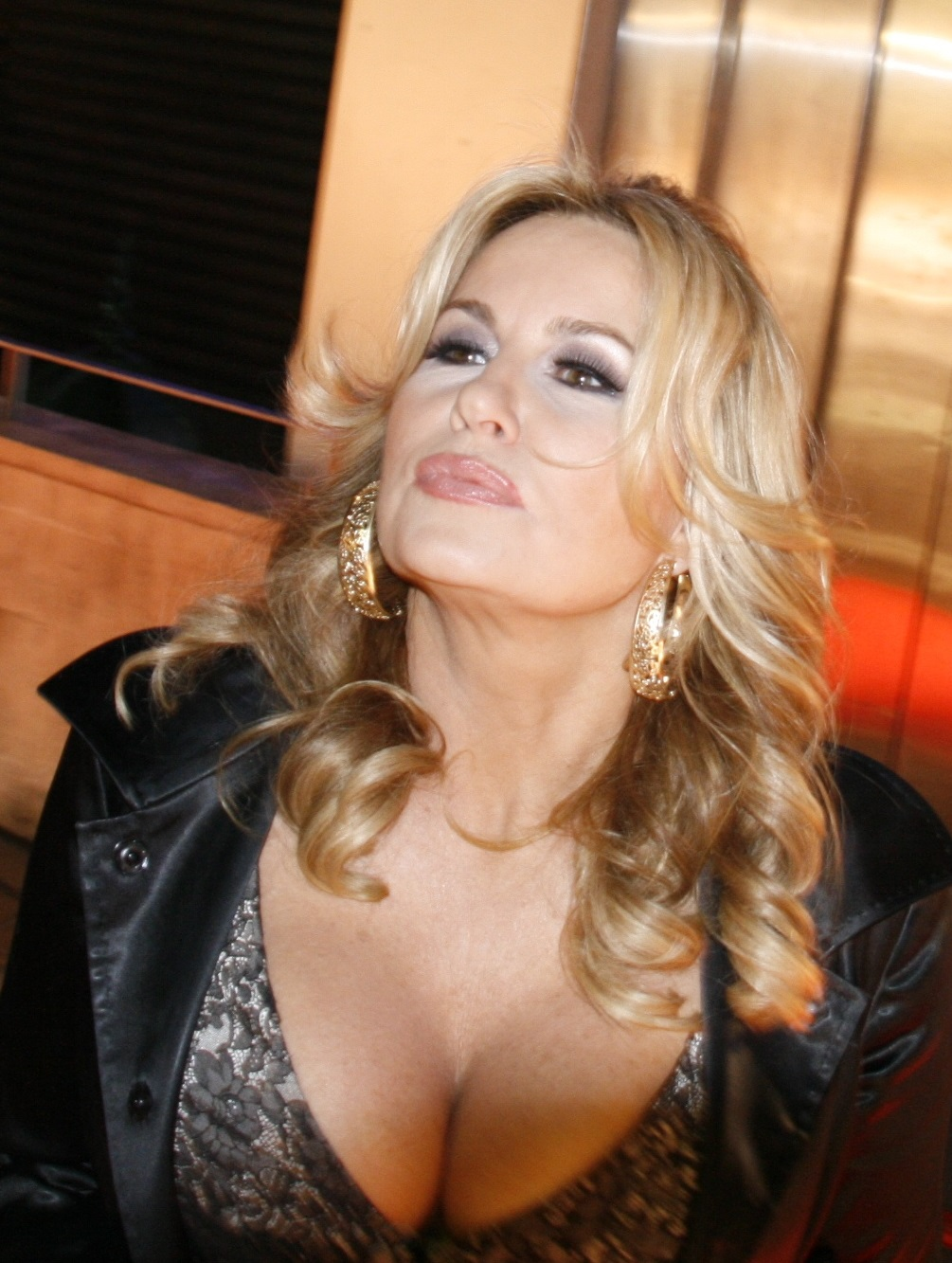
Jennifer Coolidge won for The White Lotus (2022).

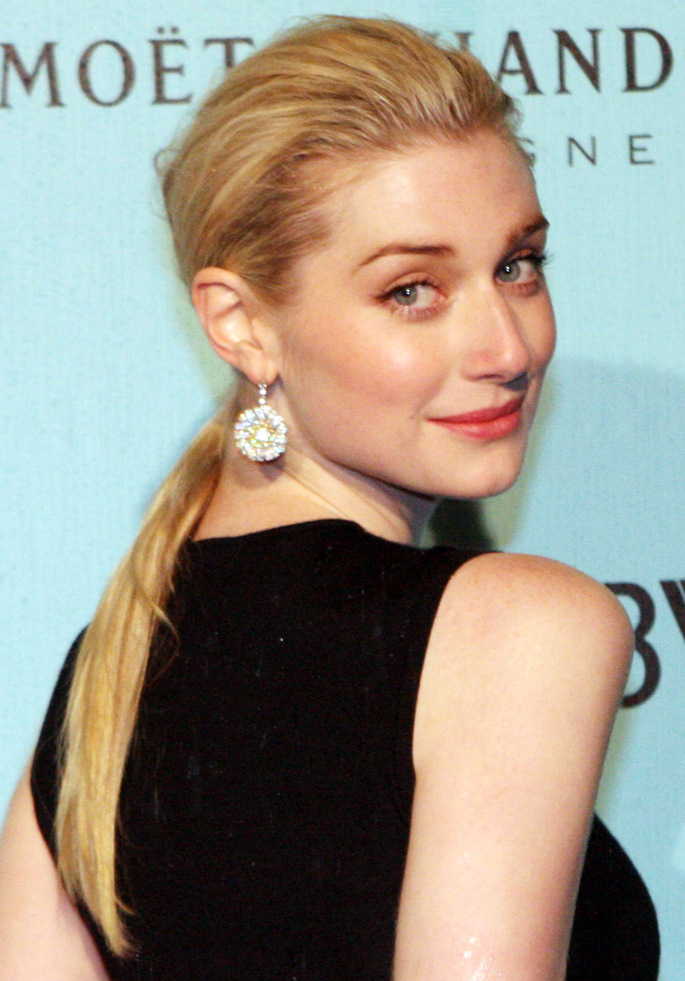
Elizabeth Debicki won for The Crown (2023).

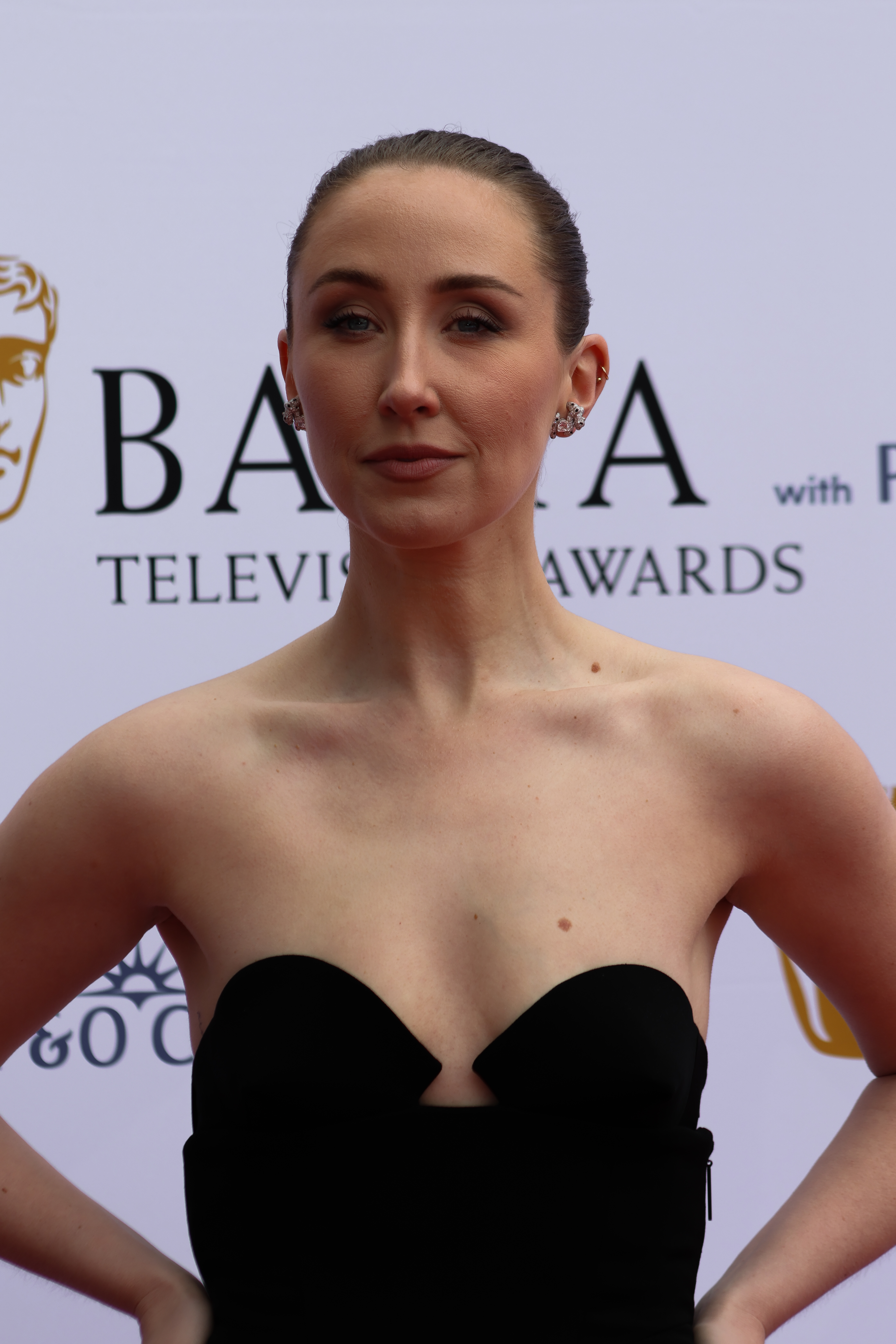
Erin Doherty won for Adolescence (2025).

Listed below are the winners of the award for each year, as well as the other nominees:

| Key | Meaning |
|---|---|
| ‡ | Indicates the winning actress |

=== Best Supporting Actress – Television Series ===
==== 1970s ====
| Year | Actor | Role | Program | Network | Ref |
|---|---|---|---|---|---|
1970 (28th)
| 1970 (28th) | Gail Fisher ‡ | Peggy Fair | Mannix | CBS | |
| 1970 (28th) | Sue Ane Langdon | Lilian Nuvo | Arnie | CBS | |
| 1970 (28th) | Miyoshi Umeki | Mrs. Livingston | The Courtship of Eddie's Father | ABC | |
| 1970 (28th) | Karen Valentine | Miss Alice Johnson | Room 222 | ABC | |
| 1970 (28th) | Lesley Ann Warren | Dana Lambert | Mission: Impossible | CBS | |
1971 (29th)
| 1971 (29th) | Sue Ane Langdon ‡ | Lilian Nuvo | Arnie | CBS | |
| 1971 (29th) | Amanda Blake | Miss Kitty Russell | Gunsmoke | CBS | |
| 1971 (29th) | Gail Fisher | Peggy Fair | Mannix | CBS | |
| 1971 (29th) | Sally Struthers | Gloria Stivic | All in the Family | CBS | |
| 1971 (29th) | Lily Tomlin | Various Characters | Rowan & Martin's Laugh-In | NBC | |
1972 (30th)
| 1972 (30th) | Ruth Buzzi ‡ | Various Characters | Rowan & Martin's Laugh-In | NBC | |
| 1972 (30th) | Susan Dey | Laurie Partridge | The Partridge Family | ABC | |
| 1972 (30th) | Vicki Lawrence | Various Characters | The Carol Burnett Show | CBS | |
| 1972 (30th) | Audra Lindley | Amy Fitzgerald | Bridget Loves Bernie | CBS | |
| 1972 (30th) | Sally Struthers | Gloria Stivic | All in the Family | CBS | |
| 1972 (30th) | Elena Verdugo | Consuelo Lopez | Marcus Welby, M.D. | ABC | |
1973 (31st)
| 1973 (31st) | Ellen Corby ‡ | Esther Walton | The Waltons | CBS | |
| 1973 (31st) | Gail Fisher | Peggy Fair | Mannix | CBS | |
| 1973 (31st) | Valerie Harper | Rhoda Morgenstern | The Mary Tyler Moore Show | CBS | |
| 1973 (31st) | Sally Struthers | Gloria Stivic | All in the Family | CBS | |
| 1973 (31st) | Loretta Swit | Maj. Margaret "Hot Lips" Houlihan | M*A*S*H | CBS | |
1974 (32nd)
| 1974 (32nd) | Betty Garrett ‡ | Irene Lorenzo | All in the Family | CBS | |
| 1974 (32nd) | Ellen Corby | Esther Walton | The Waltons | CBS | |
| 1974 (32nd) | Julie Kavner | Brenda Morgenstern | Rhoda | CBS | |
| 1974 (32nd) | Vicki Lawrence | Various Characters | The Carol Burnett Show | CBS | |
| 1974 (32nd) | Nancy Walker | Mildred | McMillan & Wife | NBC | |
1975 (33rd)
| 1975 (33rd) | Hermione Baddeley ‡ | Mrs. Nell Naugatuck | Maude | CBS | |
| 1975 (33rd) | Susan Howard | Maggie Petrocelli | Petrocelli | NBC | |
| 1975 (33rd) | Julie Kavner | Brenda Morgenstern | Rhoda | CBS | |
| 1975 (33rd) | Nancy Walker | Mildred | McMillan & Wife | NBC | |
| 1975 (33rd) | Nancy Walker | Ida Morgenstern | Rhoda | CBS | |
1976 (34th)
| 1976 (34th) | Josette Banzet ‡ | Miss Lenaut | Rich Man, Poor Man | ABC | |
| 1976 (34th) | Adrienne Barbeau | Carol Traynor | Maude | CBS | |
| 1976 (34th) | Darleen Carr | Tommy Caldwell | Once an Eagle | NBC | |
| 1976 (34th) | Ellen Corby | Esther Walton | The Waltons | CBS | |
| 1976 (34th) | Julie Kavner | Brenda Morgenstern | Rhoda | CBS | |
| 1976 (34th) | Vicki Lawrence | Various Characters | The Carol Burnett Show | CBS | |
| 1976 (34th) | Anne Meara | Sally Gallagher | Rhoda | CBS | |
| 1976 (34th) | Sally Struthers | Gloria Stivic | All in the Family | CBS | |
1977 (35th)
| 1977 (35th) | No Award | | | | |
1978 (36th)
| 1978 (36th) | Polly Holliday ‡ | Florence "Flo" Castleberry | Alice | CBS | |
| 1978 (36th) | Marilu Henner | Elaine Nardo | Taxi | ABC | |
| 1978 (36th) | Julie Kavner | Brenda Morgenstern | Rhoda | CBS | |
| 1978 (36th) | Linda Kelsey | Billie Newman | Lou Grant | CBS | |
| 1978 (36th) | Audra Lindley | Helen Roper | Three's Company | ABC | |
| 1978 (36th) | Nancy Walker | Ida Morgenstern | Rhoda | CBS | |
1979 (37th)
| 1979 (37th) | Polly Holliday ‡ | Florence "Flo" Castleberry | Alice | CBS | |
| 1979 (37th) | Loni Anderson | Jennifer Marlowe | WKRP in Cincinnati | CBS | |
| 1979 (37th) | Marilu Henner | Elaine Nardo | Taxi | ABC | |
| 1979 (37th) | Beth Howland | Vera Louise Gorman | Alice | CBS | |
| 1979 (37th) | Linda Kelsey | Billie Newman | Lou Grant | CBS | |

=== Best Supporting Actress – Series, Miniseries, or Television Film ===
==== 1980s ====
| Year | Actor | Role | Program | Network | Ref |
|---|---|---|---|---|---|
1980 (38th)
| 1980 (38th) | Valerie Bertinelli ‡ | Barbara Cooper | One Day at a Time | CBS | |
| 1980 (38th) | Diane Ladd ‡ | Isabelle "Belle" Dupree | Alice | CBS | |
| 1980 (38th) | Marilu Henner | Elaine Nardo | Taxi | ABC | |
| 1980 (38th) | Beth Howland | Vera Louise Gorman | Alice | CBS | |
| 1980 (38th) | Linda Kelsey | Billie Newman | Lou Grant | CBS | |
1981 (39th)
| 1981 (39th) | Valerie Bertinelli ‡ | Barbara Cooper | One Day at a Time | CBS | |
| 1981 (39th) | Danielle Brisebois | Stephanie Mills | Archie Bunker's Place | CBS | |
| 1981 (39th) | Beth Howland | Vera Louise Gorman | Alice | CBS | |
| 1981 (39th) | Marilu Henner | Elaine Nardo | Taxi | ABC | |
| 1981 (39th) | Lauren Tewes | Julie McCoy | The Love Boat | ABC | |
1982 (40th)
| 1982 (40th) | Shelley Long ‡ | Diane Chambers | Cheers | NBC | |
| 1982 (40th) | Valerie Bertinelli | Barbara Cooper | One Day at a Time | CBS | |
| 1982 (40th) | Marilu Henner | Elaine Nardo | Taxi | ABC | |
| 1982 (40th) | Beth Howland | Vera Louise Gorman | Alice | CBS | |
| 1982 (40th) | Carol Kane | Simka Dahblitz | Taxi | ABC | |
| 1982 (40th) | Loretta Swit | Maj. Margaret "Hot Lips" Houlihan | M*A*S*H | CBS | |
1983 (41st)
| 1983 (41st) | Barbara Stanwyck ‡ | Mary Carson | The Thorn Birds | ABC | |
| 1983 (41st) | Polly Holliday | Aunt Minerva | The Gift of Love: A Christmas Story | CBS | |
| 1983 (41st) | Angela Lansbury | Amanda Fenwick | The Gift of Love: A Christmas Story | CBS | |
| 1983 (41st) | Piper Laurie | Anne Mueller | The Thorn Birds | ABC | |
| 1983 (41st) | Jean Simmons | Fee Cleary | The Thorn Birds | ABC | |
| 1983 (41st) | Victoria Tennant | Pamela Tudsbury | The Winds of War | ABC | |
1984 (42nd)
| 1984 (42nd) | Faye Dunaway ‡ | Maud Charteris | Ellis Island | CBS | |
| 1984 (42nd) | Selma Diamond | Selma Hacker | Night Court | NBC | |
| 1984 (42nd) | Marla Gibbs | Florence Johnston | The Jeffersons | CBS | |
| 1984 (42nd) | Gina Lollobrigida | Francesca Gioberti | Falcon Crest | CBS | |
| 1984 (42nd) | Rhea Perlman | Carla Tortelli | Cheers | NBC | |
| 1984 (42nd) | Roxana Zal | Amelia Bennett | Something About Amelia | ABC | |
1985 (43rd)
| 1985 (43rd) | Sylvia Sidney ‡ | Beatrice McKenna | An Early Frost | NBC | |
| 1985 (43rd) | Lesley-Anne Down | Madeline Fabray | North and South | ABC | |
| 1985 (43rd) | Katherine Helmond | Mona Robinson | Who's the Boss? | ABC | |
| 1985 (43rd) | Kate Reid | Linda Loman | Death of a Salesman | CBS | |
| 1985 (43rd) | Inga Swenson | Gretchen Kraus | Benson | ABC | |
1986 (44th)
| 1986 (44th) | Olivia de Havilland ‡ | Dowager Empress Maria Feodorovna | Anastasia: The Mystery of Anna | NBC | |
| 1986 (44th) | Justine Bateman | Mallory Keaton | Family Ties | NBC | |
| 1986 (44th) | Piper Laurie | Annie Gilbert | Promise | CBS | |
| 1986 (44th) | Lilli Palmer | Tsarina Natalya | Peter the Great | NBC | |
| 1986 (44th) | Geraldine Page | Itta Halaunbrenner | Nazi Hunter: The Beate Klarsfeld Story | ABC | |
| 1986 (44th) | Rhea Perlman | Carla Tortelli | Cheers | NBC | |
1987 (45th)
| 1987 (45th) | Claudette Colbert ‡ | Alice Grenville | The Two Mrs. Grenvilles | NBC | |
| 1987 (45th) | Allyce Beasley | Agnes DiPesto | Moonlighting | ABC | |
| 1987 (45th) | Julia Duffy | Stephanie Vanderkellen | Newhart | CBS | |
| 1987 (45th) | Christine Lahti | Althea Milford | Amerika | ABC | |
| 1987 (45th) | Rhea Perlman | Carla Tortelli | Cheers | NBC | |
1988 (46th)
| 1988 (46th) | Katherine Helmond ‡ | Mona Robinson | Who's the Boss? | ABC | |
| 1988 (46th) | Jackée Harry | Sandra Clark | 227 | NBC | |
| 1988 (46th) | Swoosie Kurtz | Doris Steadman | Baja Oklahoma | HBO | |
| 1988 (46th) | Rhea Perlman | Carla Tortelli | Cheers | NBC | |
| 1988 (46th) | Susan Ruttan | Roxanne Melman | L.A. Law | NBC | |
1989 (47th)
| 1989 (47th) | Amy Madigan ‡ | Sarah Weddington | Roe vs. Wade | NBC | |
| 1989 (47th) | Anjelica Huston | Clara Allen | Lonesome Dove | CBS | |
| 1989 (47th) | Rhea Perlman | Carla Tortelli | Cheers | NBC | |
| 1989 (47th) | Susan Ruttan | Roxanne Melman | L.A. Law | NBC | |
| 1989 (47th) | Julie Sommars | Julie Marsh | Matlock | NBC | |

==== 1990s ====
| Year | Actor | Role | Program | Network | Ref |
|---|---|---|---|---|---|
1990 (48th)
| 1990 (48th) | Piper Laurie ‡ | Catherine Martell | Twin Peaks | ABC | |
| 1990 (48th) | Sherilyn Fenn | Audrey Horne | Twin Peaks | ABC | |
| 1990 (48th) | Faith Ford | Corky Sherwood | Murphy Brown | CBS | |
| 1990 (48th) | Marg Helgenberger | Karen "K.C." Koloski | China Beach | ABC | |
| 1990 (48th) | Park Overall | Laverne Todd | Empty Nest | NBC | |
1991 (49th)
| 1991 (49th) | Amanda Donohoe ‡ | Cara Jean Lamb | L.A. Law | NBC | |
| 1991 (49th) | Sammi Davis | Caroline Hailey | Homefront | ABC | |
| 1991 (49th) | Faith Ford | Corky Sherwood | Murphy Brown | CBS | |
| 1991 (49th) | Estelle Getty | Sophia Petrillo | The Golden Girls | NBC | |
| 1991 (49th) | Park Overall | Laverne Todd | Empty Nest | NBC | |
| 1991 (49th) | Rhea Perlman | Carla Tortelli | Cheers | NBC | |
| 1991 (49th) | Jean Stapleton | Henny | Fire in the Dark | CBS | |
1992 (50th)
| 1992 (50th) | Joan Plowright ‡ | Olga Alliluyeva | Stalin | HBO | |
| 1992 (50th) | Olympia Dukakis | Dolly Sinatra | Sinatra | CBS | |
| 1992 (50th) | Laurie Metcalf | Jackie Harris | Roseanne | ABC | |
| 1992 (50th) | Park Overall | Laverne Todd | Empty Nest | NBC | |
| 1992 (50th) | Amanda Plummer | Lusia Burke | Miss Rose White | NBC | |
| 1992 (50th) | Gena Rowlands | Honora Swift | Crazy in Love | TNT | |
1993 (51st)
| 1993 (51st) | Julia Louis-Dreyfus ‡ | Elaine Benes | Seinfeld | NBC | |
| 1993 (51st) | Cynthia Gibb | Louise / Gypsy Rose Lee | Gypsy | CBS | |
| 1993 (51st) | Ann-Margret | Sally Jackson | Alex Haley's Queen | CBS | |
| 1993 (51st) | Cecilia Peck | Margaret Church | The Portrait | TNT | |
| 1993 (51st) | Theresa Saldana | Rachel Scali | The Commish | ABC | |
1994 (52nd)
| 1994 (52nd) | Miranda Richardson ‡ | Charlie Maguire | Fatherland | HBO | |
| 1994 (52nd) | Sônia Braga | Regina de Carvalho | The Burning Season | HBO | |
| 1994 (52nd) | Tyne Daly | Alice Henderson | Christy | CBS | |
| 1994 (52nd) | Jane Leeves | Daphne Moon | Frasier | NBC | |
| 1994 (52nd) | Laura Leighton | Sydney Andrews | Melrose Place | Fox | |
| 1994 (52nd) | Julia Louis-Dreyfus | Elaine Benes | Seinfeld | NBC | |
| 1994 (52nd) | Laurie Metcalf | Jackie Harris | Roseanne | ABC | |
| 1994 (52nd) | Leigh Taylor-Young | Rachel Harris | Picket Fences | CBS | |
| 1994 (52nd) | Liz Torres | Mahalia Sanchez | The John Larroquette Show | NBC | |
1995 (53rd)
| 1995 (53rd) | Shirley Knight ‡ | Peggy Buckey | Indictment: The McMartin Trial | HBO | |
| 1995 (53rd) | Christine Baranski | Maryann Thorpe | Cybill | CBS | |
| 1995 (53rd) | Judy Davis | Diane Divelbess | Serving in Silence: The Margarethe Cammermeyer Story | NBC | |
| 1995 (53rd) | Melanie Griffith | Dora DuFran | Buffalo Girls | CBS | |
| 1995 (53rd) | Lisa Kudrow | Phoebe Buffay | Friends | NBC | |
| 1995 (53rd) | Julianna Margulies | Carol Hathaway | ER | NBC | |
1996 (54th)
| 1996 (54th) | Kathy Bates ‡ | Helen Kushnick | The Late Shift | HBO | |
| 1996 (54th) | Christine Baranski | Maryann Thorpe | Cybill | CBS | |
| 1996 (54th) | Cher | Dr. Beth Thompson | If These Walls Could Talk | HBO | |
| 1996 (54th) | Kristen Johnston | Sally Solomon | 3rd Rock from the Sun | NBC | |
| 1996 (54th) | Greta Scacchi | Tsarina Alexandra | Rasputin: Dark Servant of Destiny | HBO | |
1997 (55th)
| 1997 (55th) | Angelina Jolie ‡ | Cornelia Wallace | George Wallace | TNT | |
| 1997 (55th) | Joely Fisher | Paige Clark | Ellen | ABC | |
| 1997 (55th) | Della Reese | Tess | Touched by an Angel | CBS | |
| 1997 (55th) | Gloria Reuben | Jeanie Boulet | ER | NBC | |
| 1997 (55th) | Mare Winningham | Lurleen Wallace | George Wallace | TNT | |
1998 (56th)
| 1998 (56th) | Faye Dunaway ‡ | Wilhelmina Cooper | Gia | HBO | |
| 1998 (56th) | Camryn Manheim ‡ | Ellenor Frutt | The Practice | ABC | |
| 1998 (56th) | Helena Bonham Carter | Morgan le Fay | Merlin | NBC | |
| 1998 (56th) | Jane Krakowski | Elaine Vassal | Ally McBeal | Fox | |
| 1998 (56th) | Wendie Malick | Nina Van Horn | Just Shoot Me! | NBC | |
| 1998 (56th) | Susan Sullivan | Kitty Montgomery | Dharma & Greg | ABC | |
1999 (57th)
| 1999 (57th) | Nancy Marchand ‡ | Livia Soprano | The Sopranos | HBO | |
| 1999 (57th) | Kathy Bates | Miss Agatha Hannigan | Annie | ABC | |
| 1999 (57th) | Jacqueline Bisset | Isabelle d'Arc | Joan of Arc | CBS | |
| 1999 (57th) | Kim Cattrall | Samantha Jones | Sex and the City | HBO | |
| 1999 (57th) | Melanie Griffith | Marion Davies | RKO 281 | HBO | |
| 1999 (57th) | Cynthia Nixon | Miranda Hobbes | Sex and the City | HBO | |
| 1999 (57th) | Miranda Richardson | Dinah Pellerin | The Big Brass Ring | Showtime | |

==== 2000s ====
| Year | Actor | Role | Program | Network | Ref |
|---|---|---|---|---|---|
2000 (58th)
| 2000 (58th) | Vanessa Redgrave ‡ | Edith Tree | If These Walls Could Talk 2 | HBO | |
| 2000 (58th) | Kim Cattrall | Samantha Jones | Sex and the City | HBO | |
| 2000 (58th) | Faye Dunaway | Meg Gable | Running Mates | TNT | |
| 2000 (58th) | Allison Janney | C. J. Cregg | The West Wing | NBC | |
| 2000 (58th) | Megan Mullally | Karen Walker | Will & Grace | NBC | |
| 2000 (58th) | Cynthia Nixon | Miranda Hobbes | Sex and the City | HBO | |
2001 (59th)
| 2001 (59th) | Rachel Griffiths ‡ | Brenda Chenowith | Six Feet Under | HBO | |
| 2001 (59th) | Jennifer Aniston | Rachel Green | Friends | NBC | |
| 2001 (59th) | Tammy Blanchard | Young Judy Garland | Life with Judy Garland: Me and My Shadows | ABC | |
| 2001 (59th) | Allison Janney | C. J. Cregg | The West Wing | NBC | |
| 2001 (59th) | Megan Mullally | Karen Walker | Will & Grace | NBC | |
2002 (60th)
| 2002 (60th) | Kim Cattrall ‡ | Samantha Jones | Sex and the City | HBO | |
| 2002 (60th) | Megan Mullally | Karen Walker | Will & Grace | NBC | |
| 2002 (60th) | Cynthia Nixon | Miranda Hobbes | Sex and the City | HBO | |
| 2002 (60th) | Parker Posey | Jinger Heath | Hell on Heels: The Battle of Mary Kay | CBS | |
| 2002 (60th) | Gena Rowlands | Virginia Miller | Hysterical Blindness | HBO | |
2003 (61st)
| 2003 (61st) | Mary-Louise Parker ‡ | Harper Pitt | Angels in America | HBO | |
| 2003 (61st) | Kim Cattrall | Samantha Jones | Sex and the City | HBO | |
| 2003 (61st) | Kristin Davis | Charlotte York Goldenblatt | Sex and the City | HBO | |
| 2003 (61st) | Megan Mullally | Karen Walker | Will & Grace | NBC | |
| 2003 (61st) | Cynthia Nixon | Miranda Hobbes | Sex and the City | HBO | |
2004 (62nd)
| 2004 (62nd) | Anjelica Huston ‡ | Carrie Chapman Catt | Iron Jawed Angels | HBO | |
| 2004 (62nd) | Drea de Matteo | Adriana La Cerva | The Sopranos | HBO | |
| 2004 (62nd) | Nicollette Sheridan | Edie Britt | Desperate Housewives | ABC | |
| 2004 (62nd) | Charlize Theron | Britt Ekland | The Life and Death of Peter Sellers | HBO | |
| 2004 (62nd) | Emily Watson | Anne Sellers | The Life and Death of Peter Sellers | HBO | |
2005 (63rd)
| 2005 (63rd) | Sandra Oh ‡ | Dr. Cristina Yang | Grey's Anatomy | ABC | |
| 2005 (63rd) | Candice Bergen | Shirley Schmidt | Boston Legal | ABC | |
| 2005 (63rd) | Camryn Manheim | Gladys Presley | Elvis | CBS | |
| 2005 (63rd) | Elizabeth Perkins | Celia Hodes | Weeds | Showtime | |
| 2005 (63rd) | Joanne Woodward | Francine Whiting | Empire Falls | HBO | |
2006 (64th)
| 2006 (64th) | Emily Blunt ‡ | Natasha Warner | Gideon's Daughter | BBC America | |
| 2006 (64th) | Toni Collette | Kathy Graham | Tsunami: The Aftermath | HBO | |
| 2006 (64th) | Katherine Heigl | Dr. Isobel "Izzie" Stevens | Grey's Anatomy | ABC | |
| 2006 (64th) | Sarah Paulson | Harriet Hayes | Studio 60 on the Sunset Strip | NBC | |
| 2006 (64th) | Elizabeth Perkins | Celia Hodes | Weeds | Showtime | |
2007 (65th)
| 2007 (65th) | Samantha Morton ‡ | Myra Hindley | Longford | HBO | |
| 2007 (65th) | Rose Byrne | Ellen Parsons | Damages | FX | |
| 2007 (65th) | Rachel Griffiths | Sarah Whedon | Brothers & Sisters | ABC | |
| 2007 (65th) | Katherine Heigl | Dr. Isobel "Izzie" Stevens | Grey's Anatomy | ABC | |
| 2007 (65th) | Anna Paquin | Elaine Goodale | Bury My Heart at Wounded Knee | HBO | |
| 2007 (65th) | Jaime Pressly | Joy Turner | My Name Is Earl | NBC | |
2008 (66th)
| 2008 (66th) | Laura Dern ‡ | Katherine Harris | Recount | HBO | |
| 2008 (66th) | Eileen Atkins | Deborah Jenkyns | Cranford | PBS | |
| 2008 (66th) | Melissa George | Laura Hill | In Treatment | HBO | |
| 2008 (66th) | Rachel Griffiths | Sarah Whedon | Brothers & Sisters | ABC | |
| 2008 (66th) | Dianne Wiest | Dr. Gina Toll | In Treatment | HBO | |
2009 (67th)
| 2009 (67th) | Chloë Sevigny ‡ | Nicolette "Nicki" Grant | Big Love | HBO | |
| 2009 (67th) | Jane Adams | Tanya Skagle | Hung | HBO | |
| 2009 (67th) | Rose Byrne | Ellen Parsons | Damages | FX | |
| 2009 (67th) | Jane Lynch | Sue Sylvester | Glee | Fox | |
| 2009 (67th) | Janet McTeer | Clementine Churchill | Into the Storm | HBO | |

==== 2010s ====
| Year | Actor | Role | Program | Network | Ref |
|---|---|---|---|---|---|
2010 (68th)
| 2010 (68th) | Jane Lynch ‡ | Sue Sylvester | Glee | Fox | |
| 2010 (68th) | Hope Davis | Hillary Clinton | The Special Relationship | HBO | |
| 2010 (68th) | Kelly Macdonald | Margaret Schroeder | Boardwalk Empire | HBO | |
| 2010 (68th) | Julia Stiles | Lumen Pierce | Dexter | Showtime | |
| 2010 (68th) | Sofía Vergara | Gloria Delgado-Pritchett | Modern Family | ABC | |
2011 (69th)
| 2011 (69th) | Jessica Lange ‡ | Constance Langdon | American Horror Story | FX | |
| 2011 (69th) | Kelly Macdonald | Margaret Thompson | Boardwalk Empire | HBO | |
| 2011 (69th) | Maggie Smith | Violet Crawley, Dowager Countess of Grantham | Downton Abbey | PBS | |
| 2011 (69th) | Sofía Vergara | Gloria Delgado-Pritchett | Modern Family | ABC | |
| 2011 (69th) | Evan Rachel Wood | Veda Pierce | Mildred Pierce | HBO | |
2012 (70th)
| 2012 (70th) | Maggie Smith ‡ | Violet Crawley, Dowager Countess of Grantham | Downton Abbey | PBS | |
| 2012 (70th) | Hayden Panettiere | Juliette Barnes | Nashville | ABC | |
| 2012 (70th) | Archie Panjabi | Kalinda Sharma | The Good Wife | CBS | |
| 2012 (70th) | Sarah Paulson | Nicolle Wallace | Game Change | HBO | |
| 2012 (70th) | Sofía Vergara | Gloria Delgado-Pritchett | Modern Family | ABC | |
2013 (71st)
| 2013 (71st) | Jacqueline Bisset ‡ | Lavinia, Lady Cremone | Dancing on the Edge | Starz | |
| 2013 (71st) | Janet McTeer | Jacquetta of Luxembourg, Countess Rivers | The White Queen | Starz | |
| 2013 (71st) | Hayden Panettiere | Juliette Barnes | Nashville | ABC | |
| 2013 (71st) | Monica Potter | Kristina Braverman | Parenthood | NBC | |
| 2013 (71st) | Sofía Vergara | Gloria Delgado-Pritchett | Modern Family | ABC | |
2014 (72nd)
| 2014 (72nd) | Joanne Froggatt ‡ | Anna Bates | Downton Abbey | PBS | |
| 2014 (72nd) | Uzo Aduba | Suzanne "Crazy Eyes" Warren | Orange Is the New Black | Netflix | |
| 2014 (72nd) | Kathy Bates | Ethel Darling | American Horror Story: Freak Show | FX | |
| 2014 (72nd) | Allison Janney | Bonnie Plunkett | Mom | CBS | |
| 2014 (72nd) | Michelle Monaghan | Maggie Hart | True Detective | HBO | |
2015 (73rd)
| 2015 (73rd) | Maura Tierney ‡ | Helen Solloway | The Affair | Showtime | |
| 2015 (73rd) | Uzo Aduba | Suzanne "Crazy Eyes" Warren | Orange Is the New Black | Netflix | |
| 2015 (73rd) | Joanne Froggatt | Anna Bates | Downton Abbey | PBS | |
| 2015 (73rd) | Regina King | Aliyah Shadeed | American Crime | ABC | |
| 2015 (73rd) | Judith Light | Shelly Pfefferman | Transparent | Prime Video | |
2016 (74th)
| 2016 (74th) | Olivia Colman ‡ | Angela Burr | The Night Manager | AMC | |
| 2016 (74th) | Lena Headey | Cersei Lannister | Game of Thrones | HBO | |
| 2016 (74th) | Chrissy Metz | Kate Pearson | This Is Us | NBC | |
| 2016 (74th) | Mandy Moore | Rebecca Pearson | This Is Us | NBC | |
| 2016 (74th) | Thandiwe Newton | Maeve Millay | Westworld | HBO | |
2017 (75th)
| 2017 (75th) | Laura Dern ‡ | Renata Klein | Big Little Lies | HBO | |
| 2017 (75th) | Ann Dowd | Aunt Lydia | The Handmaid's Tale | Hulu | |
| 2017 (75th) | Chrissy Metz | Kate Pearson | This Is Us | NBC | |
| 2017 (75th) | Michelle Pfeiffer | Ruth Madoff | The Wizard of Lies | HBO | |
| 2017 (75th) | Shailene Woodley | Jane Chapman | Big Little Lies | HBO | |
2018 (76th)
| 2018 (76th) | Patricia Clarkson ‡ | Adora Crellin | Sharp Objects | HBO | |
| 2018 (76th) | Alex Borstein | Susie Myerson | The Marvelous Mrs. Maisel | Prime Video | |
| 2018 (76th) | Penélope Cruz | Donatella Versace | The Assassination of Gianni Versace: American Crime Story | FX | |
| 2018 (76th) | Thandiwe Newton | Maeve Millay | Westworld | HBO | |
| 2018 (76th) | Yvonne Strahovski | Serena Joy Waterford | The Handmaid's Tale | Hulu | |
2019 (77th)
| 2019 (77th) | Patricia Arquette ‡ | Dee Dee Blanchard | The Act | Hulu | |
| 2019 (77th) | Helena Bonham Carter | Princess Margaret | The Crown | Netflix | |
| 2019 (77th) | Toni Collette | Det. Grace Rasmussen | Unbelievable | Netflix | |
| 2019 (77th) | Meryl Streep | Mary Louise Wright | Big Little Lies | HBO | |
| 2019 (77th) | Emily Watson | Ulana Khomyuk | Chernobyl | HBO | |

==== 2020s ====
| Year | Actor | Role | Program | Network | Ref |
|---|---|---|---|---|---|
2020 (78th)
| 2020 (78th) | Gillian Anderson ‡ | Margaret Thatcher | The Crown | Netflix | |
| 2020 (78th) | Helena Bonham Carter | Princess Margaret | The Crown | Netflix | |
| 2020 (78th) | Julia Garner | Ruth Langmore | Ozark | Netflix | |
| 2020 (78th) | Annie Murphy | Alexis Rose | Schitt's Creek | Pop TV | |
| 2020 (78th) | Cynthia Nixon | Gwendolyn Briggs | Ratched | Netflix | |
2021 (79th)
| 2021 (79th) | Sarah Snook ‡ | Siobhan "Shiv" Roy | Succession | HBO | |
| 2021 (79th) | Jennifer Coolidge | Tanya McQuoid | The White Lotus | HBO | |
| 2021 (79th) | Kaitlyn Dever | Betsy Mallum | Dopesick | Hulu | |
| 2021 (79th) | Andie MacDowell | Paula Russell | Maid | Netflix | |
| 2021 (79th) | Hannah Waddingham | Rebecca Welton | Ted Lasso | Apple TV+ | |
| 2022 (80th) | Best Supporting Actress in a Television Series – Comedy/Musical or Drama | | | | |
| 2022 (80th) | Julia Garner ‡ | Ruth Langmore | Ozark | Netflix | |
| 2022 (80th) | Elizabeth Debicki | Diana, Princess of Wales | The Crown | Netflix | |
| 2022 (80th) | Hannah Einbinder | Ava Daniels | Hacks | HBO Max | |
| 2022 (80th) | Janelle James | Ava Coleman | Abbott Elementary | ABC | |
| 2022 (80th) | Sheryl Lee Ralph | Barbara Howard | Abbott Elementary | ABC | |
| 2022 (80th) | Best Supporting Actress in a Limited or Anthology Series or Television Film | | | | |
| 2022 (80th) | Jennifer Coolidge ‡ | Tanya McQuoid | The White Lotus: Sicily | HBO | |
| 2022 (80th) | Claire Danes | Rachel Fleishman | Fleishman Is in Trouble | FX | |
| 2022 (80th) | Daisy Edgar-Jones | Brenda Lafferty | Under the Banner of Heaven | FX | |
| 2022 (80th) | Niecy Nash | Glenda Cleveland | Dahmer – Monster: The Jeffrey Dahmer Story | Netflix | |
| 2022 (80th) | Aubrey Plaza | Harper Spiller | The White Lotus: Sicily | HBO | |
2023 (81st)
| 2023 (81st) | Elizabeth Debicki ‡ | Diana, Princess of Wales | The Crown | Netflix | |
| 2023 (81st) | Abby Elliott | Natalie "Sugar" Berzatto | The Bear | FX | |
| 2023 (81st) | Christina Ricci | Misty Quigley | Yellowjackets | Showtime | |
| 2023 (81st) | J. Smith-Cameron | Gerri Kellman | Succession | HBO | |
| 2023 (81st) | Meryl Streep | Loretta Durkin | Only Murders in the Building | Hulu | |
| 2023 (81st) | Hannah Waddingham | Rebecca Welton | Ted Lasso | Apple TV+ | |
2024 (82nd)
| 2024 (82nd) | Jessica Gunning ‡ | Martha Scott | Baby Reindeer | Netflix | |
| 2024 (82nd) | Liza Colón-Zayas | Tina Marrero | The Bear | FX | |
| 2024 (82nd) | Hannah Einbinder | Ava Daniels | Hacks | Max | |
| 2024 (82nd) | Dakota Fanning | Marge Sherwood | Ripley | Netflix | |
| 2024 (82nd) | Allison Janney | Vice President Grace Penn | The Diplomat | Netflix | |
| 2024 (82nd) | Kali Reis | Trooper Evangeline Navarro | True Detective: Night Country | HBO | |
2025 (83rd)
| 2025 (83rd) | Erin Doherty ‡ | Briony Ariston | Adolescence | Netflix | |
| 2025 (83rd) | Hannah Einbinder | Ava Daniels | Hacks | HBO Max | |
| 2025 (83rd) | Catherine O'Hara | Patty Leigh | The Studio | Apple TV+ | |
| 2025 (83rd) | Carrie Coon | Laurie Duffy | The White Lotus | HBO | |
| 2025 (83rd) | Parker Posey | Victoria Ratliff | The White Lotus | HBO | |
| 2025 (83rd) | Aimee Lou Wood | Chelsea | The White Lotus | HBO | |

== Superlatives ==
=== Multiple wins ===
| Wins | Name |
|---|---|
| 2 | Valerie Bertinelli |
| 2 | Laura Dern |
| 2 | Faye Dunaway |
| 2 | Polly Holliday |

=== Multiple nominations ===
| Nominations | Name |
|---|---|
| 6 | Rhea Perlman |
| 5 | Marilu Henner |
| 4 | Kim Cattrall |
| 4 | Beth Howland |
| 4 | Allison Janney |
| 4 | Julie Kavner |
| 4 | Megan Mullally |
| 4 | Cynthia Nixon |
| 4 | Sally Struthers |
| 4 | Sofía Vergara |
| 4 | Nancy Walker |
| 3 | Kathy Bates |
| 3 | Valerie Bertinelli |
| 3 | Helena Bonham Carter |
| 3 | Ellen Corby |
| 3 | Faye Dunaway |
| 3 | Hannah Einbinder |
| 3 | Gail Fisher |
| 3 | Rachel Griffiths |
| 3 | Polly Holliday |
| 3 | Linda Kelsey |
| 3 | Piper Laurie |
| 3 | Vicki Lawrence |
| 3 | Park Overall |
| 2 | Uzo Aduba |
| 2 | Christine Baranski |
| 2 | Jacqueline Bisset |
| 2 | Rose Byrne |
| 2 | Toni Collette |
| 2 | Jennifer Coolidge |
| 2 | Elizabeth Debicki |
| 2 | Laura Dern |
| 2 | Faith Ford |
| 2 | Joanne Froggatt |
| 2 | Julia Garner |
| 2 | Melanie Griffith |
| 2 | Katherine Heigl |
| 2 | Katherine Helmond |
| 2 | Anjelica Huston |
| 2 | Sue Ane Langdon |
| 2 | Audra Lindley |
| 2 | Julia Louis-Dreyfus |
| 2 | Jane Lynch |
| 2 | Kelly Macdonald |
| 2 | Camryn Manheim |
| 2 | Janet McTeer |
| 2 | Laurie Metcalf |
| 2 | Chrissy Metz |
| 2 | Thandiwe Newton |
| 2 | Hayden Panettiere |
| 2 | Sarah Paulson |
| 2 | Elizabeth Perkins |
| 2 | Parker Posey |
| 2 | Miranda Richardson |
| 2 | Gena Rowlands |
| 2 | Susan Ruttan |
| 2 | Maggie Smith |
| 2 | Meryl Streep |
| 2 | Loretta Swit |
| 2 | Hannah Waddingham |

== See also ==
- TCA Award for Individual Achievement in Drama
- TCA Award for Individual Achievement in Comedy
- Primetime Emmy Award for Outstanding Supporting Actress in a Drama Series
- Critics' Choice Television Award for Best Supporting Actress in a Drama Series
- Primetime Emmy Award for Outstanding Supporting Actress in a Comedy Series
- Critics' Choice Television Award for Best Supporting Actress in a Comedy Series
- Critics' Choice Television Award for Best Supporting Actress in a Movie/Miniseries
- Screen Actors Guild Award for Outstanding Performance by a Female Actor in a Drama Series
- Screen Actors Guild Award for Outstanding Performance by a Female Actor in a Comedy Series
- Primetime Emmy Award for Outstanding Supporting Actress in a Limited or Anthology Series or Movie
- Screen Actors Guild Award for Outstanding Performance by a Female Actor in a Miniseries or Television Movie
