= Ian McDougall (producer) =

Canadian television producer (1945–2010)

Ian McDougall (2 May 1945 – 24 August 2010) was a Canadian television producer, best known for producing Anne of Green Gables, which won a Gemini and an Emmy Award.

McDougall died of heart failure in Pennsylvania on 24 August 2010.
