= LaMotta =

LaMotta may refer to:

- Jake LaMotta (1922–2017), American boxer
- Joey LaMotta (1925–2020), American boxer and manager
- Joseph LaMotta (1948–1998), the son of boxer Jake LaMotta
- Richard LaMotta (1942–2010), the inventor of the Chipwich ice cream sandwich
- Vikki LaMotta (1930–2005), the wife of boxer Jake LaMotta
