= The Bronx Bull =

- Theatrical release poster
- Directed by: Martin Guigui
- Written by: Rustam Branaman; Martin Guigui
- Produced by: Joe Allegro; Scott Reed; Ron Singer; Dahlia Waingort
- Starring: William Forsythe; Joe Mantegna; Tom Sizemore; Penelope Ann Miller; Mojean Aria; Ray Wise; Natasha Henstridge; James Russo; Robert Davi; Cloris Leachman
- Cinematography: Massimo Zeri
- Edited by: Eric Potter
- Release dates: June 13, 2016 (United Kingdom); January 6, 2017 (United States)
- Running time: 94 minutes
- Country: United States
- Language: English

The Bronx Bull is a 2016 American biographical sports film written and directed by Martin Guigui and starring William Forsythe, Paul Sorvino, Joe Mantegna, Tom Sizemore, Natasha Henstridge, and Penelope Ann Miller.

== Description ==
The film is based on the story of the legendary boxing champion Jake LaMotta and it tells the struggles of the champion with his life outside of the boxing ring. It was filmed in Los Angeles and released in United States on January 6, 2017.

== Cast ==
- William Forsythe as Jake LaMotta
- Joe Mantegna as Rick Rosselli
- Tom Sizemore as Tony
- Paul Sorvino as Giuseppe "Joey" LaMotta
- Natasha Henstridge as Sally Carlton
- Penelope Ann Miller as Debbie Forrester
- Mojean Aria as Young Jake LaMotta
- Ray Wise as Father Joseph
- James Russo as Rocky Graziano
- Robert Davi as Aaron Levy
- Cloris Leachman as Lillian Forrester
- Mike Starr as Jerry
- Joe Cortese as Vito Lazio
- Bruce Davison as District Attorney Bonami
- Dom Irrera as Joe E. Lewis
- Harry Hamlin as Lenny
- Alicia Witt as Denise Baker
- Joey Diaz as Mickey
- Alex Meraz as Paco
- Juliet Landau as Starlet
- Valentina de Angelis as Eleanor
- Courtney Gains as Chain Gang Guard

== Lawsuit ==
In 2006, Variety reported that Sunset Pictures was developing a sequel to Raging Bull, then titled Raging Bull II: Continuing the Story of Jake LaMotta and chronicling LaMotta's early life, as in the sequel novel of the same name. In July 2012, MGM, owners of United Artists, filed a lawsuit against LaMotta and the producers of Raging Bull II to keep the film from being released. MGM said that it had rights to make any authorized sequel film, which goes back to an agreement LaMotta and co-author Peter Savage made with Chartoff-Winkler Productions, which produced the original film. In addition, MGM argued that the defendants were publicly claiming the film to be a sequel to the original film, which could most likely "tarnish" its predecessor's reputation. In August 2012, the producers retitled the film The Bronx Bull, disassociating itself as a sequel to Raging Bull, and the lawsuit was subsequently dropped.
