= Sugar Ray Robinson vs. Jake LaMotta =

Historic boxing rivalry

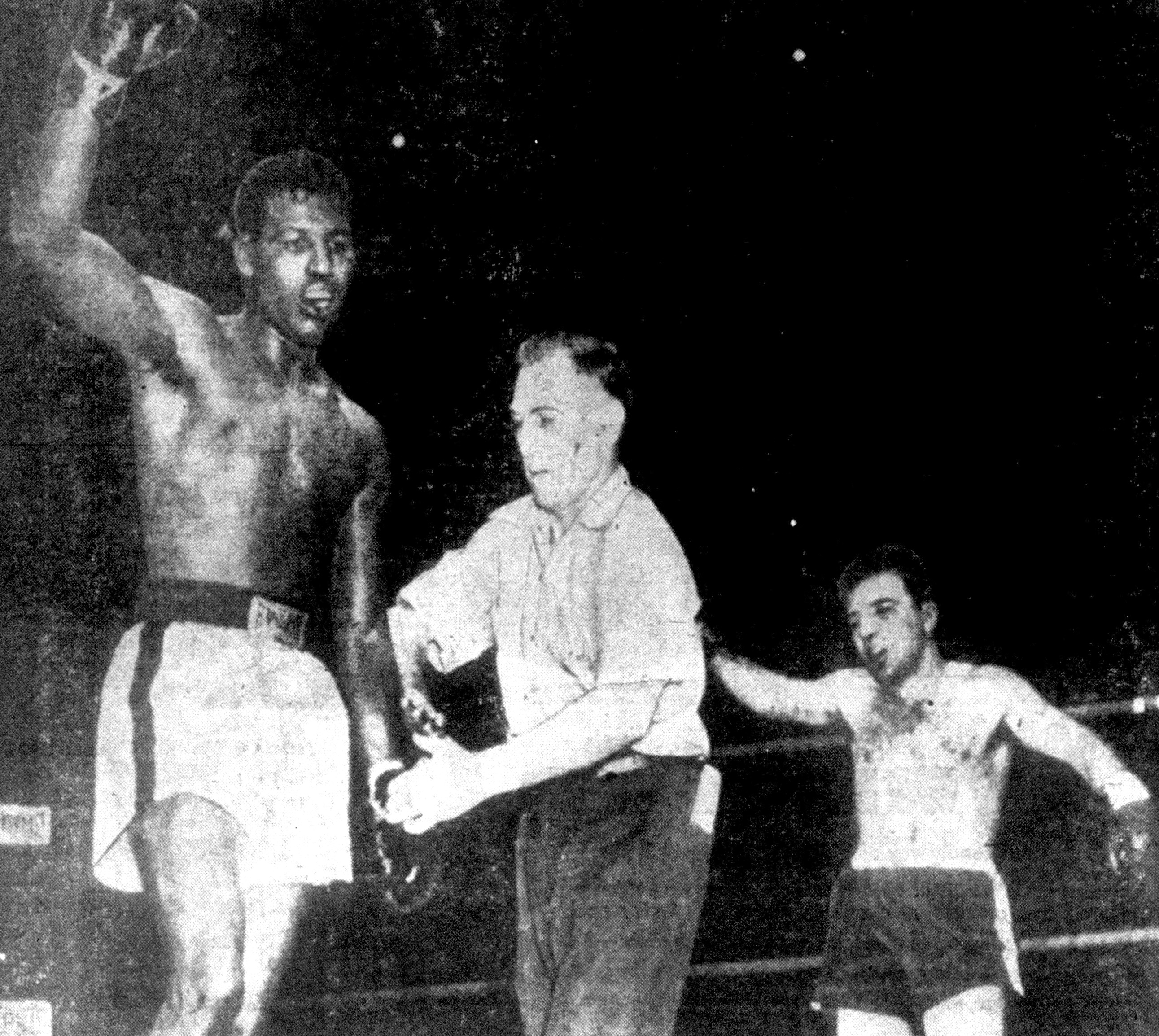
- Date: October 2, 1942 – February 14, 1951
- Title(s) on the line: NYSAC, NBA, and The Ring middleweight titles (1951)

Tale of the tape
Boxer	(United States) Sugar Ray Robinson	(United States) Jake LaMotta
Nickname	Sugar	Raging Bull
Hometown	Ailey, Georgia	New York City
Pre-fight record	121–1–2	78–14–3
Height	5 ft 11 in (180 cm)	5 ft 8 in (173 cm)
Weight	155 lb (70 kg)	160 lb (73 kg)
Style	Orthodox	Orthodox
Recognition	NYSAC, NBA, and The Ring welterweight champion	NYSAC, NBA, and The Ring middleweight champion

Sugar Ray Robinson and Jake LaMotta had a historic boxing rivalry, fighting each other on six occasions between 1942 and 1951. Robinson won the series 5–1, although many of the fights were close, with LaMotta handing Robinson his first ever loss (which remained his only loss for nearly a decade). The most famous of their encounters was their sixth and final fight, a world middleweight title match later dubbed The Saint Valentine's Day Massacre due to its brutality, with the champion LaMotta taking tremendous punishment from Robinson in the later rounds.

== Background ==
Both fighters had begun their careers in the 1940s, and their first meeting would take place relatively early into both men's careers. Going into the first fight, LaMotta had a decent record of 25–4–2, gaining a reputation as a tough fighter (all of his loses up to this point were on points, many were controversial). Robinson on the other hand was a rising star. He already had an undefeated record of 35–0, along with a 57-3 amateur career.

Both men had very different fighting styles, LaMotta was a classic swarmer, relentlessly pursuing his opponents while constantly throwing barrages of punches to overpower them. Meanwhile, Robinson had a much more fluid style depending upon the opponent, either boxing from the outside with precision or brawling at close quarters. These conflicting styles combined with their respective courage and durability made them naturally tough opponents for each other.

== Fights ==
=== Initial fights (1942–1945) ===
Robinson and LaMotta fought for the first time on October 2, 1942, the fight being held at Madison Square Garden in New York City. Despite Robinson holding a height and reach advantage over his opponent, LaMotta was heavier coming in at 158 pounds compared Robinson at 145. The undefeated Robinson was given 5:1 odds to win the fight, and went on to dominate most of the fight (aside from some trouble in the first and seventh rounds). Robinson stayed on the move and outboxed LaMotta to a unanimous decision victory, with unofficial scorecards from newspapers giving LaMotta only two of the ten rounds.

The pair would have a rematch four months later on February 5, 1943, this time at Olympia Stadium in Detroit. LaMotta came into this fight even heavier than before at 160 pounds, while Robinson weighed 144 pounds. Robinson was once again a favorite, this time having 3:1 odds of defeating his opponent. LaMotta fought much more aggressively this time, keeping constant pressure on Robinson throughout the fight. Instead of sticking and moving as he had before, Robinson attempted to slug it out with LaMotta, which proved to be a mistake. In the eighth round, LaMotta landed a right to the body followed by a left hook to the head which sent Robinson falling backward and through the ropes. Robinson was nearly knocked out, but was saved by the bell at the referee's count of nine. Robinson survived the rest of the fight but ultimately lost on points in another unanimous decision (scored 52–47, 55–45 and 57–49). This defeat would mark the end of Robinson's undefeated win streak of 40 professional fights along with his 53 amateur winning streak record (though he would soon begin another very impressive win streak).

A third fight was held 21 days later on February 26, 1943, at the same venue, with Robinson looking to avenge his only loss from LaMotta. Robinson used his boxing skills to full effect in this fight, jabbing from a distance and countering LaMotta's pressure effectively. Despite this the fight was still difficult, with LaMotta fighting harder in the later rounds. Robinson was badly hurt in the seventh round, being knocked down in his own corner and later admitting that he chose to stay down for the full eight count to recover. Robinson rallied this time, and after going the ten round distance, Robinson won another unanimous decision (51–49, 56–44 and 53–47).

The fourth fight was held on February 23, 1945, at Madison Square Garden, the location of their first fight. LaMotta suffered a cut over the forehead in the opening round, but fought on. Like the third fight Robinson used his boxing skills and scored well for most of the fight, despite surviving a scare in the sixth round when he was trapped in a corner and forced to take punishment. The fight was another victory for Robinson who won the fight 6–4, 6–3 and 7–1.

The fifth fight was held on September 26, 1945, at Comiskey Park in Chicago. This would be the closest fight of the series, with LaMotta fighting aggressively to defeat his old rival. Unlike the previous fights, the fight was held for 12 rounds instead of ten. LaMotta hoped that this would give him an advantage, but Robinson stacked up a wide lead early in the fight before pulling back the pace to fight more cautiously in the later rounds. Robinson won yet again, but this time it was a very close split decision (61–59, 61–59 and 57–63), which the crowd booed. Robinson would later state that this was his hardest fight with LaMotta.

=== Interlude ===
The fifth fight between the pair would be the duo's final fight for over five years. During the later half of the decade, both men rose through the ranks of their respective weight classes. Robinson remained undefeated since his loss to LaMotta back in 1943, and went on to win the world welterweight title in 1946, a title he successfully defended five times before moving up in weight to fight for the middleweight title. LaMotta would go on to win the world middleweight title in 1949 after defeating champion Marcel Cerdan. LaMotta would defend his middleweight title two times before facing off with Robinson for the final time on Valentine's Day of 1951.

=== Title fight ===
Robinson and LaMotta fought each other for the last time on February 14, 1951, at the Chicago Stadium. This fight would be held for the world's middleweight title, now held by LaMotta. Robinson entered the fight a 3:1 favorite over LaMotta. The champion started the fight swinging, and fought effectively in the early rounds, but soon found himself falling behind under Robinson's onslaught of combinations and counter punches. Robinson stacked together a wide lead over the course of the next ten rounds, but in the 11th, Robinson was hurt by LaMotta, who pounded away at the challenger unanswered in an attempt to put his opponent down. Despite the pressure, Robinson eventually responded with a barrage of his own punches, battering the now exhausted champion for the remainder of the round.

Robinson continued to punish LaMotta in the subsequent rounds. Robinson once again gave LaMotta another beating in the 12th, but was unable to put the champion down. In the 13th round, Robinson continued to pummel the hurt champion, who amazingly was able to stay standing under the constant punching. Robinson sent LaMotta against the ropes, and following a brutal series of unanswered punches which seemed to be finally sending the champion down, referee Frank Sikora rushed in to end the fight. Robinson won the fight via TKO, two minutes and four seconds into the 13th round. Robinson was now the new middleweight champion of the world.

== Legacy ==
Following the fight, Robinson would go on to fourteen more middleweight championship fights, winning the title a record five times over the course of the decade. He also fought unsuccessfully against Joey Maxim for the world light heavyweight title. He would continue to fight until well past his prime, retiring in 1965. After losing the title, LaMotta made an attempt to move up to light heavyweight but never fought for another world title, and retired in 1954. Both fighters were inaugural inductees of the International Boxing Hall of Fame.

Sugar Ray Robinson and Jake LaMotta's rivalry is regarded as one of the greatest in boxing history. Bleacher Report and The Fight City both ranked their fights as the second greatest boxing rivalry of all time (behind Joe Frazier and Muhammad Ali).

The fights between the two men are an important plot point of Martin Scorsese's 1980 biographical sports film Raging Bull. The film starred Robert De Niro as LaMotta, and actor Johnny Barnes played Robinson. The film was critically acclaimed, being nominated for eight Oscar's at the 53rd Academy Awards, winning two (including Best Actor awarded to De Niro for his portrayal of LaMotta) and is now regarded as one of the greatest films of all time.
