= Raging Bull =

1980 film directed by Martin Scorsese

- Theatrical release poster by Kunio Hagio
- Directed by: Martin Scorsese
- Screenplay by: Paul Schrader; Mardik Martin
- Based on: Raging Bull: My Story by: Jake LaMotta; Joseph Carter; Peter Savage
- Produced by: Irwin Winkler; Robert Chartoff
- Starring: Robert De Niro
- Cinematography: Michael Chapman
- Edited by: Thelma Schoonmaker
- Production companies: Chartoff-Winkler Productions, Inc.
- Distributed by: United Artists
- Release dates: November 14, 1980 (New York City); December 19, 1980 (United States)
- Running time: 129 minutes
- Country: United States
- Language: English
- Budget: $18 million
- Box office: $23.4 million

Raging Bull is a 1980 American biographical sports drama film directed by Martin Scorsese from a screenplay by Paul Schrader and Mardik Martin, which adapts Jake LaMotta's 1970 memoir Raging Bull: My Story. Robert De Niro stars as LaMotta, a former middleweight boxing champion whose turbulent personal life is beset by rage and jealousy. Scorsese dedicated the film to Armenian-American NYU film professor Haig P. Manoogian. The supporting cast includes Joe Pesci, Cathy Moriarty, Theresa Saldana, Frank Vincent and Nicholas Colasanto in his final film role.

Scorsese was initially reluctant to develop the project, although he eventually came to relate with LaMotta's story. Schrader rewrote Martin's first screenplay, and Scorsese and De Niro together made uncredited contributions thereafter. Pesci was a relatively unknown actor prior to the film, as was Moriarty, whom Pesci recommended. During principal photography, each of the boxing scenes was choreographed for a specific visual style, and De Niro gained approximately 60 pounds (27 kg) to portray LaMotta in his later years. Scorsese was exacting in the process of editing and mixing the film, expecting it to be his last major feature.

Raging Bull premiered in New York City on November 14, 1980, and was released in theaters by United Artists on December 19. The film had a lukewarm box office of $23.4 million against its $18 million budget, and received mixed reviews from critics. While De Niro's performance and the editing were widely acclaimed, its violent content received criticism. Raging Bull received a leading eight nominations at the 53rd Academy Awards, including Best Picture, and won two: Best Actor for De Niro and Best Editing for Thelma Schoonmaker.

In the decades since its release, Raging Bull has come to be considered one of the greatest films ever made. In 1990, it became the first film to be selected in its first year of eligibility for preservation in the US National Film Registry by the Library of Congress as being "culturally, historically, or aesthetically significant". In 2007 the American Film Institute ranked Raging Bull as the fourth-greatest American movie of all time.

== Plot ==
In 1941, Jake LaMotta is a young up-and-coming middleweight boxer who suffers his first loss to Jimmy Reeves after a controversial decision. Jake's brother Joey discusses a potential shot for the middleweight title with one of his Mafia connections, Salvy Batts. However, Jake repeatedly refuses the Mafia's help, wanting to win the championship on his own terms. Jake spots a 15-year-old girl named Vickie at a swimming pool in his Bronx neighborhood. He eventually pursues a relationship with her, despite him being already married and her being underage. In 1943, Jake defeats Sugar Ray Robinson, and has a rematch three weeks later. Despite Jake dominating Robinson during the bout, the judges surprisingly rule in favor of Robinson, who Joey feels won only because he was enlisting in the Army the following week.

By 1945, Jake marries Vickie, but he is controlling and domineering over her, and suspicious that she has feelings for other men. When she remarks off-hand that his next opponent Tony Janiro is good-looking, Jake flies into a rage, asking her what she meant by that. At the fight with Janiro, with Vickie looking on in horror, Jake makes it a point to brutally disfigure his opponent. At the Copacabana afterwards, Joey sees Vickie approach a table with Salvy and his crew. Joey confronts Vickie, who implies that she is dissatisfied in her marriage. Enraged, Joey viciously attacks Salvy in a fight that spills outside the club. Local mob boss Tommy Como orders them to patch up, and has Joey tell Jake that if he wants a shot at the championship title, which Como controls, he will have to take a dive. Jake thus throws his next match against Billy Fox, but cannot convincingly fake his defeat. He is booed out of the building and shortly thereafter suspended from boxing on suspicion of throwing the fight. By 1949, he is reinstated and wins the middleweight championship title by defeating Marcel Cerdan.

In 1950, Jake becomes increasingly paranoid that Vickie is having an affair. He asks Joey if he has slept with her, which enrages Joey and causes him to leave. After Jake presses Vickie too about this, she sarcastically confesses that she had sex with Joey, Salvy, and Tommy. In a fit of rage, Jake storms into Joey's house and assaults him in front of his wife and children, and knocks Vickie unconscious as well. Vickie returns to their home and threatens to leave, but they reconcile. After defending his championship belt in a grueling 15-round bout against Laurent Dauthuille, he calls his brother to make amends. When Jake does not speak Joey assumes Salvy is on the other end and starts insulting him; Jake hangs up. Estranged from his brother, Jake's career declines, and he loses his title to Sugar Ray Robinson in their final encounter in 1951.

By 1956, an aging and overweight Jake has retired and moved with his family to Miami. After he stays out all night at the nightclub he owns, Vickie tells him that she wants a divorce, as well as full custody of their children. She also threatens to call the police if he comes anywhere near them. Soon after, Jake is arrested for admitting underage girls into his nightclub, and he unsuccessfully attempts to bribe his way out of his criminal case by pawning the jewels on his championship belt. In 1957, he is put in solitary confinement awaiting his sentence, where he questions his misfortune and cries in despair. Returning to New York City in 1958 after serving six months, he encounters Joey, whom he forcefully embraces; Joey half-heartedly reciprocates.

In 1964, Jake performs stand-up comedy at various clubs. Backstage before a show, LaMotta prepares for his performance by shadowboxing, quoting scenes from On the Waterfront and chanting "I'm the boss".

== Cast ==
- Robert De Niro as Jake LaMotta
- Joe Pesci as Joey LaMotta
- Cathy Moriarty as Vickie LaMotta
- Frank Vincent as Salvatore "Salvy Batts"
- Nicholas Colasanto as Tommy Como
- Mario Gallo as Mario
- Joseph Bono as Guido
- Lori Anne Flax as Irma LaMotta, Jake's first wife
- Theresa Saldana as Lenora LaMotta, Joey's second wife
- Frank Adonis as "Patsy"
- Don Dunphy as Himself
- Frank Topham as "Toppy"
- Charles Scorsese as Charlie, man with Como
- James V. Christy as Dr. Pinto
- Gene LeBell as Ring Announcer, Reeves Fight
- Shay Duffin as Ring announcer, Janiro Fight
- Coley Wallace as Joe Louis
- Ted Husing as Himself, TV Announcer
- Michael Badalucco as Soda Fountain Clerk
- Geraldine Smith as Janet
- Peter Savage as Jackie Curtie
- Laura James as Mrs. Bronson
- Candy Moore as Linda
- Martin Scorsese as Barbizon Stagehand (voice)
- McKenzie Westmore as Stephanie LaMotta, Jake's daughter (uncredited)
- John Turturro as Man at Webster Hall Table (uncredited)

=== LaMotta's opponents ===
- Bill Hanrahan as Eddie Eagan
- Floyd Anderson as Jimmy Reeves
- Johnny Barnes as Sugar Ray Robinson
- Eddie Mustafa Muhammad as Billy Fox
- Kevin Mahon as Tony Janiro
- Louis Raftis as Marcel Cerdan
- Johnny Turner as Laurent Dauthuille

== Production ==
=== Development ===
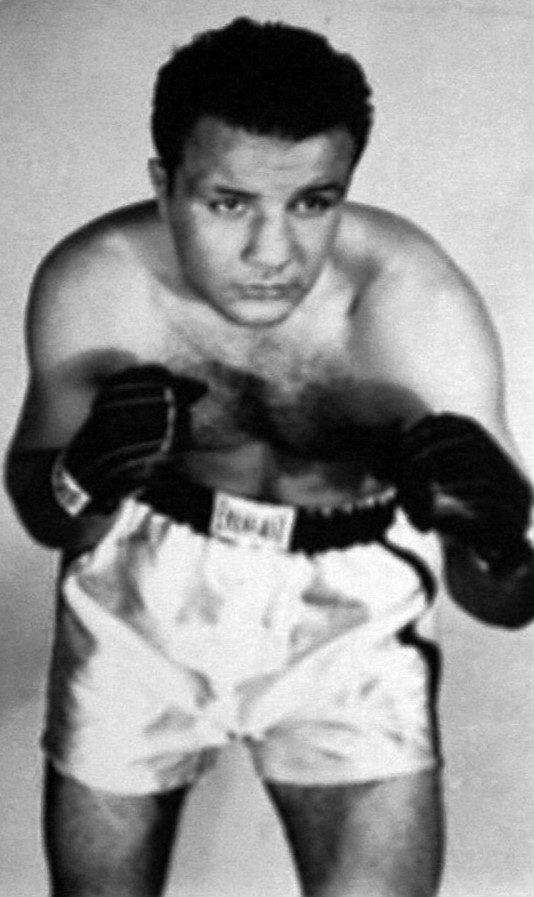
Jake LaMotta in a postcard dated 1952

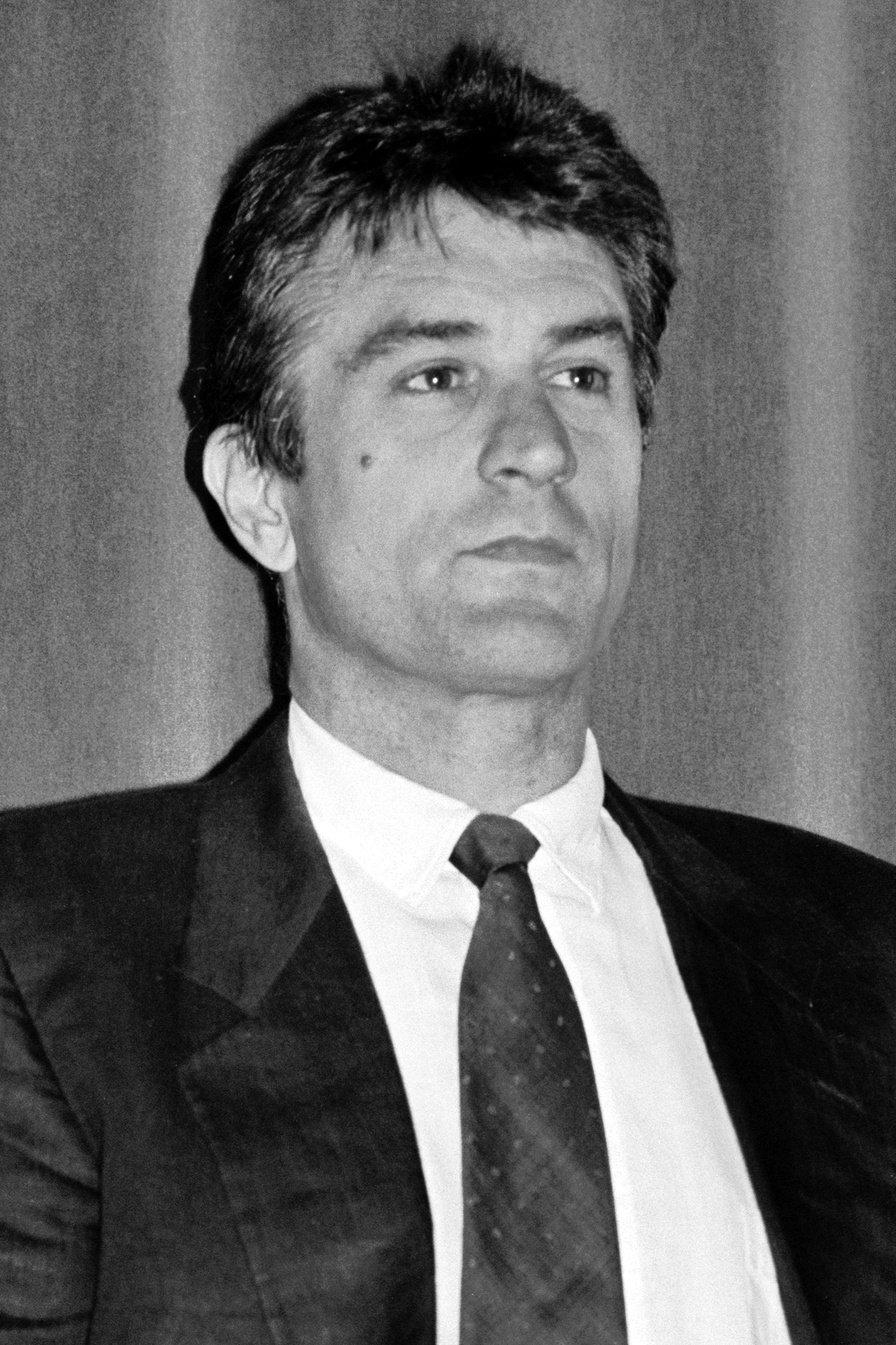
Robert De Niro portrays LaMotta in Raging Bull.

Raging Bull was initiated when Robert De Niro read the autobiography while he was on the set of The Godfather Part II. Although disappointed by the book's writing style, De Niro became fascinated by the character of Jake LaMotta. He showed the book to Martin Scorsese on the set of Alice Doesn't Live Here Anymore, with the hope that he would consider the project.

Scorsese repeatedly turned down the opportunity to direct the film, claiming that he had no idea what Raging Bull was about, although he had read some of the text. Never a sports fan, when he found out what LaMotta used to do for a living, he said, "A boxer? I don't like boxing...Even as a kid, I always thought that boxing was boring... It was something I couldn't, wouldn't grasp." His overall opinion of sport in general is, "Anything with a ball, no good."

The book was passed on to Mardik Martin, the film's eventual co-screenwriter, who said, "The trouble is the damn thing has been done a hundred times before—a fighter who has trouble with his brother and his wife and the mob is after him." De Niro had even shown the book to producers Robert Chartoff and Irwin Winkler, who were willing to assist only if Scorsese agreed.

After nearly dying from a drug overdose, Scorsese agreed to make the film, not only to save his own life but also to save his career. Scorsese began to relate very personally to the story of Jake LaMotta, and in it, he saw how the boxing ring can be "an allegory for whatever you do in life", which for him paralleled moviemaking: "You make movies, you're in the ring each time."

Robert De Niro in training with the real Jake LaMotta

Preparation for the film began when Scorsese shot some 8 mm color footage featuring De Niro boxing in a ring. One night, when the footage was being shown to De Niro, Michael Chapman and his friend and mentor, the British director Michael Powell, Powell pointed out that the color of the gloves at the time would have been only maroon, oxblood or black. It is one of the reasons that Scorsese chose to film Raging Bull in black and white. Other reasons were to distinguish the film from color films at the time, and to acknowledge the problem of fading color film stock—an issue that Scorsese recognized. Scorsese attended two matches at Madison Square Garden to aid his research, picking up on minor but essential details, such as the blood sponge and subsequently, the blood on the ropes (which would be used in the film).

Multiple titles were considered for Raging Bull, including Prizefighter and The Jake La Motta Story. Scorsese stated that Prizefighter was his favorite title, but did not select it, for he was afraid that people would think that the film was solely about boxing.

=== Screenplay ===
Under the guidance of Chartoff and Winkler, Mardik Martin was asked to start writing the screenplay. According to De Niro, under no circumstances would United Artists accept Martin's script. The story was based on the vision of journalist Pete Hamill of a 1930s and 1940s style, when boxing was known as "the great dark prince of sports". De Niro, however, was unimpressed when he finished reading the first draft.

Taxi Driver screenwriter Paul Schrader was swiftly brought in to rewrite the script around August 1978. Some of the changes that Schrader made to the script include a rewrite of the scene with the undercooked steak, and the inclusion of LaMotta seen masturbating in a Florida cell.

The character of LaMotta's brother Joey was finally added, previously absent from Martin's script. United Artists saw a massive improvement on the quality of the script. However, its chief executives Steven Bach and David Field met with Scorsese, De Niro and producer Irwin Winkler in November 1978 to say that they were worried that the content would be X-rated material and have no chance of finding an audience.

According to Scorsese, the script was left to him and De Niro, and they spent two-and-a-half weeks on the island of Saint Martin extensively re-building the content of the film. The most significant change would be the scene in which LaMotta fixes his television and accuses his wife of having an affair.

Other changes included the removal of Jake and Joey's father, the reduction of organized crime's role in the story, and a major rewrite of LaMotta's fight with Tony Janiro. They were also responsible for the end sequence in which LaMotta is alone in his dressing room, quoting "I could have been a contender" from On the Waterfront. An extract of Richard III had been considered, but Michael Powell thought that it would be a bad decision within the context of an American film. According to Steven Bach, the first two screenwriters (Martin and Schrader) would receive credit, but since there was no payment to the writer's guild on the script, De Niro and Scorsese's work remained uncredited.

=== Casting ===
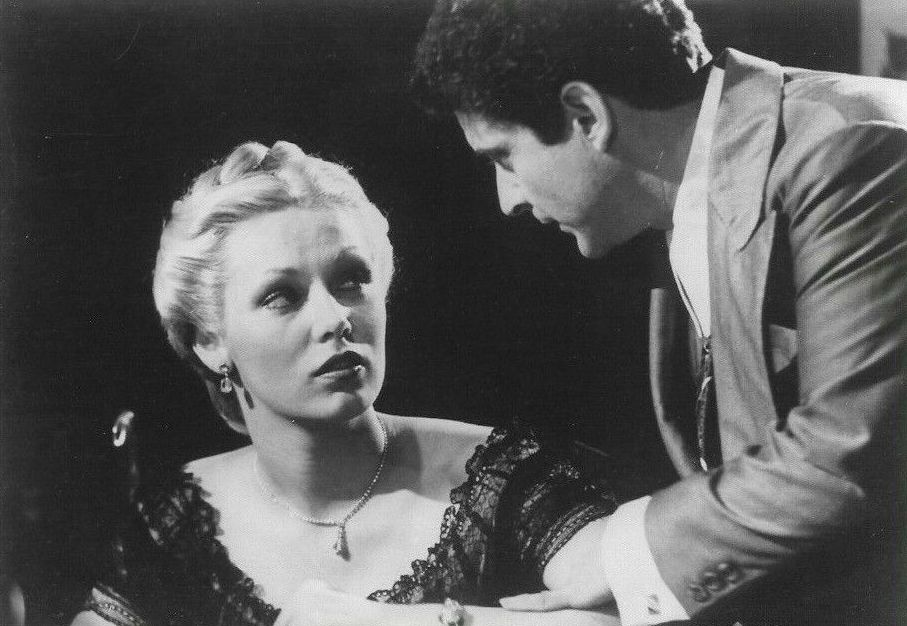
Cathy Moriarty (left) and Joe Pesci (right) on the set

One of Scorsese's trademarks was casting many actors and actresses new to the profession. De Niro, who was already committed to play Jake LaMotta, began to help Scorsese track down unfamiliar names to play his on-screen brother Joey and wife Vikki. The role of Joey LaMotta was the first to be cast. De Niro was watching a low-budget television film called The Death Collector when he saw the part of a young career criminal played by a relatively-unknown Joe Pesci as an ideal candidate. Prior to receiving a call from De Niro and Scorsese for the proposal to star in the film, Pesci had not worked in film for four years and was working at an Italian restaurant in New Jersey.

The role of Vikki (spelled "Vickie" in the final film), Jake's second wife, had interest across the board, but it was Pesci who suggested the unknown Cathy Moriarty from a picture that he saw at a New Jersey disco. Both De Niro and Scorsese believed that Moriarty, at 18 years old, could portray the role after meeting with her on several occasions and noticing her husky voice "and a confident sexuality beyond her years." The duo had to prove to the Screen Actors Guild that she was right for the role when Cis Corman showed 10 comparing pictures of Moriarty and the real Vikki LaMotta for proof that she had a resemblance.

Moriarty was asked to take a screen test, which she managed—partly aided by some improvised lines from De Niro—after some confusion wondering why the crew was filming her take. Joe Pesci also persuaded his former show-biz pal and co-star in The Death Collector, Frank Vincent, to audition for the role of Salvy Batts. Following a successful audition and screen test, Vincent received the call to say that he had received the part. Charles Scorsese, the director's father, made his film debut as Tommy Como's cousin Charlie.

While in the midst of practicing a Bronx accent and preparing for his role, De Niro met with both LaMotta and his ex-wife Vikki on separate occasions. Vikki, who lived in Florida, told stories about her life with her former husband, and showed old home movies (that later inspired a similar sequence to be done for the film).

Jake LaMotta, on the other hand, served as his trainer, accompanied by Al Silvani as coach at the Gramercy club in New York City, getting him into shape. The actor found that boxing came naturally to him; he entered as a middleweight boxer, winning two of his three fights in a Brooklyn ring dubbed "young LaMotta" by the commentator. According to Jake LaMotta, De Niro was one of the top 20 best middleweight boxers of all time.

=== Principal photography ===
Filming of the boxing scenes with director, Scorsese (center left, with beard) and the director of photography, Michael Chapman (center right, with white shirt)

According to the sound mixer, Michael Evje, the film began shooting at the Los Angeles Olympic Auditorium on April 16, 1979. Grips hung huge curtains of black duvetyne on all four sides of the ring area to contain the artificial smoke used extensively for visual effect.

On May 7, the production moved to the Culver City studio, Stage 3, and filmed there until the middle of June. Scorsese made it clear during filming that he did not appreciate the traditional way of showing fights from the spectators' view. He insisted that one camera operated by the Director of Photography, Michael Chapman, would be placed inside of the ring, as he would play the role of an opponent keeping out of the way of other fighters, so that viewers could see the emotions of the fighters, including those of Jake.

The precise moves of the boxers were to be done as dance routines from the information of a book about dance instructors in the mode of Arthur Murray. A punching bag in the middle of the ring was used by De Niro between takes before he aggressively came straight on to do the next scene. The initial five-week schedule for the shooting of the boxing scenes took longer than expected, putting Scorsese under pressure.

According to Scorsese, production of the film was closed for nearly four months with the entire crew being paid, so that De Niro could go on a binge-eating trip around northern Italy and France. When he arrived in the United States, his weight had increased from 145 to 215 pounds (66 to 97 kg). The scenes with the heftier Jake LaMotta—which include announcing his retirement from boxing and LaMotta in a Florida cell—were completed seven-to-eight weeks later when approaching Christmas 1979, so as not to aggravate the health issues that were affecting De Niro's posture, breathing and talking.

According to Evje, Jake's nightclub sequence was filmed in a closed San Pedro club on December 3. The jail cell head-banging scene was shot on a constructed set, with De Niro asking for minimal crew to be present. There was not even a boom operator present.

The final sequence, in which Jake LaMotta is in front of his mirror, was filmed on the last day of shooting, requiring 19 takes, with only the 13th being used for the film. Scorsese wanted to have an atmosphere that would be so cold that the words would have an impact as he tries to come to terms with his relationship with his brother.

=== Post-production ===
The editing of Raging Bull began when production was temporarily put on hold and was completed in 1980. Scorsese worked with the editor Thelma Schoonmaker to achieve a final cut of the film. Their main decision was to abandon Schrader's idea of LaMotta's nightclub act interweaving with the flashback of his youth, and instead followed the lines of a single flashback, in which only scenes of LaMotta practicing his stand-up would remain bookending the film.

A sound mix arranged by Frank Warner was a delicate process that took six months. According to Scorsese, the sound on Raging Bull was difficult because each punch, camera shot and flash bulb would be different. Also, there was the issue of trying to balance the quality between scenes featuring dialogue and those involving boxing (which were done in Dolby Stereo). Raging Bull went through a test screening in front of a small audience including the chief executives of United Artists, Steven Bach and Andy Albeck. The screening was shown at the M-G-M screening room in New York in July 1980. Albeck praised Scorsese by calling him a "true artist".

According to the producers Robert Chartoff and Irwin Winkler, matters were made worse when United Artists decided not to distribute the film but no other studios were interested when they attempted to sell the rights. Scorsese made no secret that Raging Bull would be his "Hollywood swan song" and he took unusual care of its rights during post-production. Scorsese threatened to remove his credit from the film if he was not allowed to sort a reel that obscured the name of a whisky brand (Cutty Sark) that was heard in a scene. The work was completed four days shy of the premiere.

In 2012, Raging Bull was voted by the Motion Picture Editors Guild as the best-edited film in history.

=== Copyright litigation ===
Paula Petrella, heir to Frank Petrello, whose works were allegedly sources for the film, filed for copyright infringement in 2009 based on MGM's 1991 copyright renewal of the film. In 2014, the Supreme Court held, in Petrella v. Metro-Goldwyn-Mayer, Inc., that Petrella's suit survived MGM's defense of "laches", the legal doctrine that protects defendants from unreasonable delays by potential plaintiffs. The case was remanded to lower courts, meaning that Petrella could receive a decision on the merits of her claim. MGM settled with Petrella in 2015.

== Reception ==
=== Box office ===
The brew of violence and anger, combined with the lack of a proper advertising campaign, led to the film's lukewarm box-office intake of $23 million, compared to its $18 million budget. By the time it left theaters, it earned $10.1 million in theatrical rentals (equivalent to $32.2 million in 2024). Scorsese became concerned for his future, and worried that producers and studios may refuse to finance his films. According to Box Office Mojo, the film grossed $23,383,987 in domestic theaters (equivalent to $74.5 million in 2024).

=== Critical response ===
When it premiered in New York City on November 14, 1980, the release of Raging Bull was met with polarized reviews, but the film would receive widespread critical acclaim, and is widely regarded as one of Scorsese's best works.

On the review aggregator Rotten Tomatoes, the film has an approval rating of 92% based on 151 reviews, with an average rating of 9.30/10. The site's critical consensus reads, "Arguably Martin Scorsese's and Robert De Niro's finest film, Raging Bull is often painful to watch, but it's a searing, powerful work about an unsympathetic hero." Metacritic, which assigns a weighted average, gave it a score of 90 out of 100, based on 28 reviews, indicating "universal acclaim". Audiences polled by CinemaScore gave the film an average grade of "A" on a scale of A+ to F.

Jack Kroll of Newsweek called Raging Bull the "best movie of the year".

Critic for The New Yorker, Pauline Kael described the film not as a biographical film about a boxer, but as a "biography of the genre of prize fighting" further saying the film is "tabloid grand opera" and "overripe, ready for canonization" in which Scorsese puts his "unmediated obsessions on the screen."

Vincent Canby of The New York Times said that Scorsese "has made his most ambitious film as well as his finest", and went on to praise Moriarty's debut performance, saying, "Either she is one of the film finds of the decade or Mr. Scorsese is Svengali. Perhaps both."

Time praised De Niro's performance because "much of Raging Bull exists because of the possibilities it offers De Niro to display his own explosive art".

Steven Jenkins from the British Film Institute's (BFI) magazine Monthly Film Journal said that "Raging Bull may prove to be Scorsese's finest achievement to date".

=== Accolades ===
Award	Category	Recipient	Result
Academy Awards	Best Picture	Irwin Winkler and Robert Chartoff	Nominated
Academy Awards	Best Director	Martin Scorsese	Nominated
Academy Awards	Best Actor	Robert De Niro	Won
Academy Awards	Best Supporting Actor	Joe Pesci	Nominated
Academy Awards	Best Supporting Actress	Cathy Moriarty	Nominated
Academy Awards	Best Cinematography	Michael Chapman	Nominated
Academy Awards	Best Film Editing	Thelma Schoonmaker	Won
Academy Awards	Best Sound	Donald O. Mitchell, Bill Nicholson, David J. Kimball, and Les Lazarowitz	Nominated
American Cinema Editors Awards	Best Edited Feature Film	Thelma Schoonmaker	Won
Boston Society of Film Critics Awards	Best Film		Won
Boston Society of Film Critics Awards	Best Actor	Robert De Niro	Won
Boston Society of Film Critics Awards	Best Cinematography	Michael Chapman	Won
British Academy Film Awards	Best Actor in a Leading Role	Robert De Niro	Nominated
British Academy Film Awards	Best Editing	Thelma Schoonmaker	Won
British Academy Film Awards	Most Promising Newcomer to Leading Film Roles	Cathy Moriarty	Nominated
British Academy Film Awards	Most Promising Newcomer to Leading Film Roles	Joe Pesci	Won
Directors Guild of America Awards	Outstanding Directorial Achievement	Martin Scorsese	Nominated
Golden Globe Awards	Best Motion Picture – Drama		Nominated
Golden Globe Awards	Best Director	Martin Scorsese	Nominated
Golden Globe Awards	Best Screenplay	Mardik Martin and Paul Schrader	Nominated
Golden Globe Awards	Best Actor in a Motion Picture – Drama	Robert De Niro	Won
Golden Globe Awards	Best Supporting Actor in a Motion Picture	Joe Pesci	Nominated
Golden Globe Awards	Best Supporting Actress in a Motion Picture	Cathy Moriarty	Nominated
Golden Globe Awards	New Star of the Year – Actress	Cathy Moriarty	Nominated
Los Angeles Film Critics Association Awards	Best Film		Won
Los Angeles Film Critics Association Awards	Best Actor	Robert De Niro	Won
National Board of Review Awards	Top Ten Films		2nd place
National Board of Review Awards	Best Actor	Robert De Niro	Won
National Board of Review Awards	Best Supporting Actor	Joe Pesci	Won
National Film Preservation Board	National Film Registry		Inducted
National Society of Film Critics Awards	Best Film		2nd place
National Society of Film Critics Awards	Best Director	Martin Scorsese	Won
National Society of Film Critics Awards	Best Actor	Robert De Niro	2nd place
National Society of Film Critics Awards	Best Supporting Actor	Joe Pesci	Won
National Society of Film Critics Awards	Best Supporting Actress	Cathy Moriarty	3rd place
National Society of Film Critics Awards	Best Cinematography	Michael Chapman	Won
New York Film Critics Circle Awards	Best Film		Runner-up
New York Film Critics Circle Awards	Best Director	Martin Scorsese	Runner-up
New York Film Critics Circle Awards	Best Actor	Robert De Niro	Won
New York Film Critics Circle Awards	Best Supporting Actor	Joe Pesci	Won

The Oscars were held the day after President Ronald Reagan was shot by John Hinckley, who did it as an attempt to impress Jodie Foster, who played a child prostitute in another of Scorsese's famous films, Taxi Driver (which also starred De Niro). Out of fear of being attacked, Scorsese went to the ceremony with FBI bodyguards disguised as guests who escorted him before the announcement of the Academy Award for Best Picture was made (the winner being Robert Redford's Ordinary People).

The Los Angeles Film Critics Association voted Raging Bull the best film of 1980, and De Niro best actor. The National Board of Review also voted De Niro best actor and Pesci best supporting actor. The Berlin International Film Festival chose Raging Bull to open the festival in 1981.

The 2012 Parajanov-Vartanov Institute Award honored screenwriter Mardik Martin "for the mastery of his pen on iconic American films" Mean Streets and Raging Bull.

=== Legacy ===
By the end of the 1980s, Raging Bull had cemented its reputation as a modern classic. It was voted the best film of the 1980s in numerous critics' polls, and is regularly pointed to as both Scorsese's best film and one of the finest American films ever made. Several prominent critics, among them Roger Ebert, declared the film to be an instant classic and the consummation of Scorsese's earlier promise. Ebert proclaimed it the best film of the 1980s, and one of the ten greatest films of all time. The film has been deemed "culturally, historically, and aesthetically significant" by the United States Library of Congress and was selected for preservation in the National Film Registry in 1990.

Raging Bull was listed by Time magazine as one of the All-TIME 100 Movies. Variety magazine ranked the film number 39 on their list of the 50 greatest movies. Raging Bull is fifth on Entertainment Weekly's list of the 100 Greatest Movies of All Time. The film tied with Bicycle Thieves and Vertigo at number 6 on Sight & Sound's 2002 poll of the greatest movies. When Sight & Sound's directors' and critics' lists from that year are combined, Raging Bull gets the most votes of any movie that has been produced since 1975. In 2002, Film4 held a poll of the 100 Greatest Movies, on which Raging Bull was voted in at number 20. Halliwell's Film Guide, a British film guide, placed Raging Bull seventh in a poll naming their selection for the "Top 1,000 Movies". TV Guide also included the film on their list of the 50 best movies. Movieline magazine included the film on its list of the 100 best movies. Leonard Maltin included Raging Bull on his 100 Must-See Films of the 20th Century list. Video Detective also included the film on its list of the top 100 movies of all time. Roger Ebert named "Robert De Niro's transformation from sleek boxer to paunchy nightclub owner in Raging Bull" as one of the 100 Greatest Movie Moments. The National Society of Film Critics ranked it #75 on their 100 Essential Films list. Rolling Stone magazine ranked it #6 on their list of the 100 Maverick Movies in the Last 100 Years.

A 1997 readers poll conducted by the L.A. Daily News ranked the film #64 on a list of the greatest American movies. In 2006, the Writers Guild of America named the film as the 76th best screenplay of all time. Raging Bull is #7 on Time Out Film Guide's "Centenary Top 100" list, and it also tied at #16 (with Lawrence of Arabia) on their 1998 readers poll. In 2008, Empire magazine held a poll of The 500 Greatest Movies of All Time, taking votes from 10,000 readers, 150 film makers, and 50 film critics in which Raging Bull was placed at number 11. It was also placed on a similar list of 1000 movies by The New York Times. In 2010, Total Film selected the film as one of The 100 Greatest Movies of All Time. FilmSite.org, a subsidiary of American Movie Classics, placed Raging Bull on their list of the 100 greatest movies. Additionally, Films101.com ranked the film as the 17th best movie of all time in a list of the 10,790 most notable.

In 2012, the Motion Picture Editors Guild listed the film as the best-edited film of all time based on a survey of its membership. In the 2012 Sight & Sound polls, it was ranked the 53rd-greatest film ever made in the critics' poll and 12th in the directors' poll. Contemporaries of Scorsese, like Francis Ford Coppola, have included it routinely in their lists for favorite films of all time. In 2015, Raging Bull ranked 29th on BBC's "100 Greatest American Films" list, voted on by film critics from around the world.

==== American Film Institute recognition ====
- AFI's 100 Years... 100 Movies: #24
- AFI's 100 Years... 100 Thrills: #51
- AFI's 100 Years... 100 Movies (10th Anniversary Edition): #4
- AFI's 10 Top 10: #1 Sports

== Soundtrack ==
Martin Scorsese decided to assemble a soundtrack made of music that was popular at the time using his personal collection of 78s. With the help of Robbie Robertson, the songs were carefully chosen so they would be the ones that a person would hear on the radio, at the pool or in bars and clubs which reflected the mood of that particular era. Some lyrics from songs would also be slipped into some dialogue. The Intermezzo from Cavalleria rusticana by Italian composer Pietro Mascagni would serve as the main theme to Raging Bull after a successful try-out by Scorsese and the editor, Thelma Schoonmaker, over the film's opening titles. Two other Mascagni pieces were used in the film: the Barcarolle from Silvano, and the Intermezzo (Ratcliff's Dream) from Guglielmo Ratcliff. A two-CD soundtrack was released in 2005, long after the film was released, because of earlier difficulties obtaining rights for many of the songs, which Scorsese selected from his childhood memories growing up in New York.

== Dispute over sequel ==
In 2006, Variety reported that Sunset Pictures was developing a combination sequel and prequel film entitled Raging Bull II: Continuing the Story of Jake LaMotta, chronicling LaMotta's life before and after the events of the original film, as told in the memoir of the same name. Filming began on June 15, 2012, with William Forsythe as the older LaMotta and Mojean Aria as the younger version (before the events of the first film). The film, directed by Martin Guigui, also stars Joe Mantegna, Tom Sizemore, Penelope Ann Miller, Natasha Henstridge, Alicia Witt, Ray Wise, Harry Hamlin, and James Russo as Rocky Graziano. In July 2012, MGM, owners of United Artists, filed a lawsuit against LaMotta and the producers of the new film to block it from being released. MGM argued that they had the rights to make any authorized sequel to the original book, tracing their claim back to an agreement LaMotta and co-author Peter Savage made with Chartoff-Winkler, producers of the original film. MGM argued that the defendants were publicly claiming the film to be a sequel to the original film, which they said could "tarnish" the original film's reputation. In August 2012, the suit was settled, with producers of the new film retitling it The Bronx Bull and agreeing not to market it as a sequel to Raging Bull. The film was released in 2016.

== See also ==
- List of boxing films

== Sources ==
- Baxter, John (2006) [2002]. De Niro: A Biography. London: HarperCollins Entertainment. ISBN 0-00-653230-6. OCLC 53460849.
- Biskind, Peter (1998). Easy Riders, Raging Bulls. New York: Simon & Schuster. ISBN 0-684-80996-6.
- Evans, Mike (2006). The Making of Raging Bull. London: Unanimous Ltd. ISBN 1-903318-83-1.
- Scorsese, Martin (1996). Thompson, Christie; David, Ian (eds.). Scorsese on Scorsese. London: Faber & Faber. ISBN 0-571-17827-8. OCLC 35599754 – via Internet Archive.
- Wilson, Michael (2011). Scorsese On Scorsese. Cahiers du Cinéma. ISBN 978-2-86642-702-3.
