= Laurent Dauthuille =

French boxer (1924–1971)

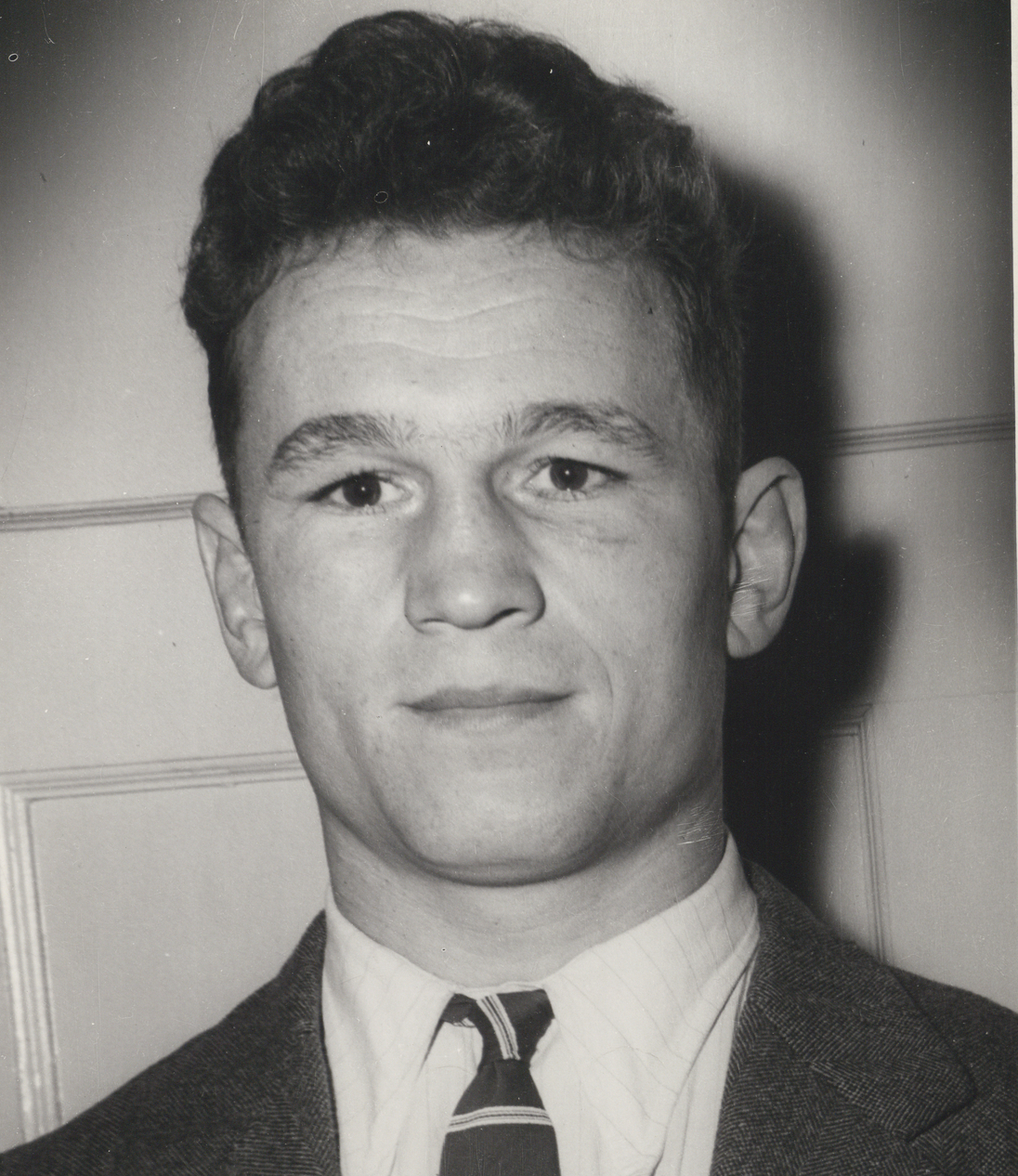

Personal information
- Nickname: The Tarzan of Buzenval
- Nationality: (France) French
- Born: Laurent Dauthuille; 20 February 1924 Chaumont, France
- Died: 10 July 1971 (aged 47) Rueil-Malmaison, France
- Weight: Middleweight

Boxing career
- Stance: Orthodox

Boxing record
- Total fights: 62
- Wins: 45
- Win by KO: 24
- Losses: 13
- Draws: 4
- No contests: 0

Laurent Dauthuille (20 February 1924 – 10 July 1971) was a French boxer.

Arriving in Montreal in the late 1940s, he was nicknamed the Tarzan of Buzenval. During his career Dauthuille beat notable fighters such as Jake LaMotta, Steve Belloise, Tony Janiro, Eugene Hairston, Norman Hayes, Johnny Greco, Paddy Young, Bobby Dawson, Tuzo Portuguez, Luc van Dam, and Robert Charron. Dauthuille's biggest fight came on September 13, 1950, he fought Jake LaMotta, a boxer he once bested by unanimous decision, for the world middleweight championship. He was ahead on all cards going into the 15th and final round of the match, when he was felled by a late flurry of punches from LaMotta. He ultimately lost by knockout when he was counted out with 13 seconds left in the fight. The fight was named Ring Magazine's fight of the year for 1950. He fought 15 more times but never again for a world title.

== See also ==
- The Babes Make the Law (1955)
