= Mario Gallo (actor) =

American film and television actor

- Born: March 22, 1923; Brooklyn, New York, U.S.
- Died: October 30, 1984 (aged 61); Ontario, California, U.S.
- Occupations: Film and television actor
- Years active: 1949–1983
- Spouses: Shirley Smith Gallo (div. 1956): Marlene Gallo
- Children: 4

Mario Gallo (March 22, 1923 – October 30, 1984) was an American film and television actor. He is best known for playing Mario, the Jake LaMotta trainer in the 1980 Martin Scorsese film Raging Bull.

== Life and career ==
Gallo was born in Brooklyn, New York. He worked in New York, moving to Los Angeles, California in the 1950s. Gallo guest-starred in television programs including Peter Gunn, Police Woman, The Rockford Files, Wagon Train, Baretta, The Untouchables, Johnny Staccato and Columbo. He also appeared in films such as Too Late Blues, Aloha Bobby and Rose, Raging Bull, King Kong, A Woman Under the Influence, The Laughing Policeman and Capone.

In 1976, Gallo co-starred in the new CBS drama television series Delvecchio, playing Sgt. Dominick Delvecchio's father Tomaso.

In 1980, director Martin Scorsese cast Gallo in Raging Bull, for the role of Mario, Jake LaMotta's trainer, who shares the fighter's disgust after the thrown fight.

== Death ==
Gallo died in October 1984 of liver cancer at his home in Ontario, California, at the age of 61.
