= Irish Bob Murphy =

American boxer

Bob Murphy
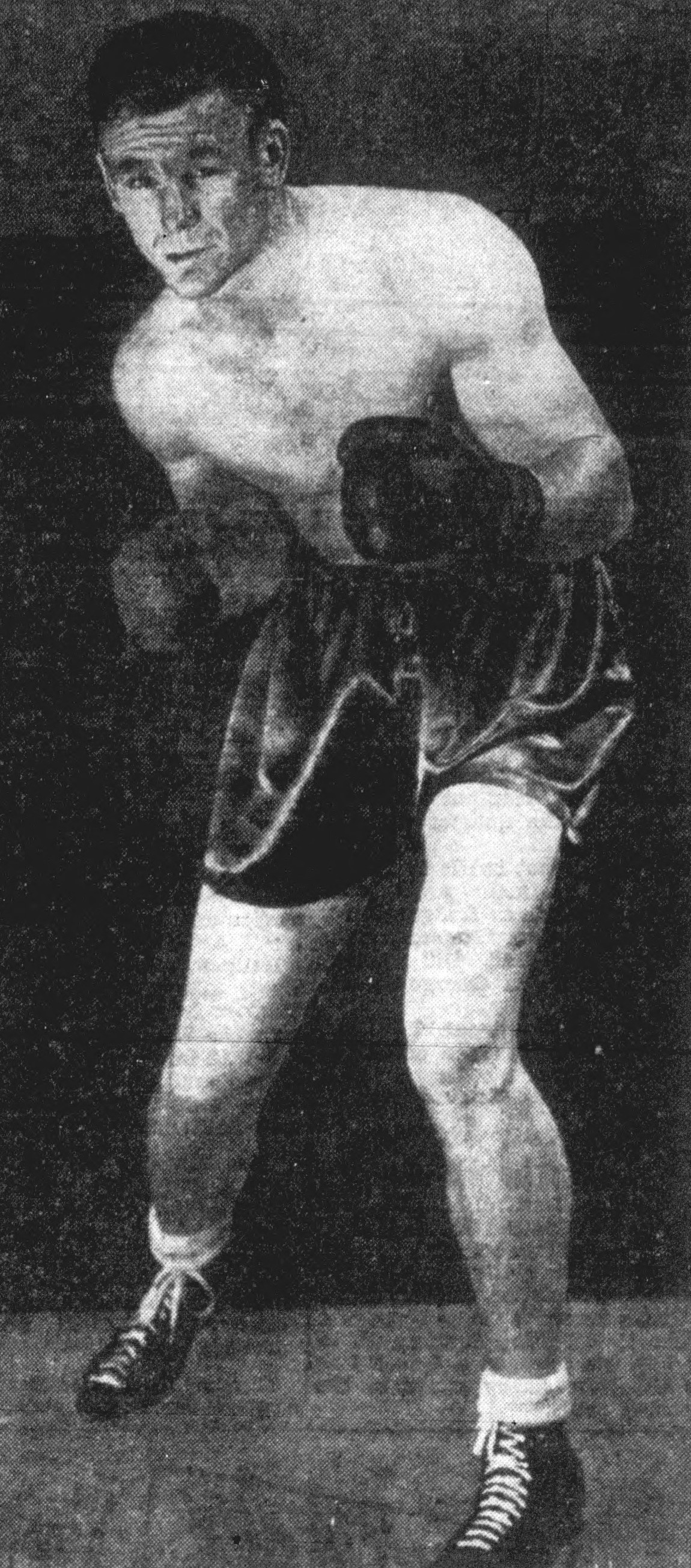
- Irish Bob Murphy in 1950

Personal information
- Nickname: Irish
- Born: Edwin Lee Conarty; July 22, 1922 Flagler, Colorado, U.S.
- Died: August 17, 1961 (aged 39) Boston, Massachusetts, U.S.
- Height: 5 ft 11 in (1.80 m)
- Weight: Light heavyweight

Boxing career
- Reach: 72 1/2 in (184 cm)
- Stance: Orthodox

Boxing record
- Total fights: 78
- Wins: 65
- Win by KO: 57
- Losses: 11
- Draws: 2

Irish Bob Murphy (July 22, 1922 – August 17, 1961) was an Irish-American light heavyweight boxer who fought from 1945 to 1954. He was born Edwin Lee Conarty in Flagler, Colorado, but fought out of San Diego, California. Murphy, who was a southpaw, was a top light heavyweight contender, and in 2003 made the Ring Magazine's list of 100 greatest punchers of all time.

== Early life ==
Edward Lee Conarty was born in Flagler, Colorado, on July 22, 1922, to Della Mae (Curtis) and John Patrick Conarty. He joined the Navy at the age of 18 in Salt Lake City, Utah, on March 18, 1941, and was assigned aboard the U.S.S. Lexington.

After the U.S.S. Lexington went down in the Battle of Coral Sea on May 8, 1942, Conarty was among the many Lexington survivors that were assigned to the U.S.S. Alabama (BB-60) to put it into commission. Conarty was known for his boxing skill and was a member of both the Lexington and Alabama boxing teams. Nicknamed "Jack" Conarty during his service aboard the "Mighty A," he was known as an exciting boxer who "packed a blockbuster in his left (southpaw) and would take anything his opponent could hand out just long enough to unload one of his bombs." It is said that he never lost a single boxing match in his entire service aboard BB-60.

== Pro career ==
Under the new professional name Irish Bob Murphy, he unsuccessfully challenged Joey Maxim for the light heavyweight championship on August 22, 1951. Although Murphy entered the ring as the favorite, Maxim clearly outboxed him and won a unanimous 15-round decision.

Murphy's biggest win came on June 27, 1951, against former middleweight champion Jake LaMotta, who had moved up to the light heavyweight division after losing his crown to Sugar Ray Robinson. LaMotta appeared poorly prepared for the bout, weighing a career-high 175½ lbs. The match stopped when LaMotta could not answer the bell for the eighth round. Murphy and LaMotta fought a rematch on June 11, 1952, and LaMotta won the decision.

Murphy retired in 1954 with a 65-11-1 record and 57 knockout wins.

== Death ==
Murphy was killed in a road accident in Boston, when he crashed his motorcycle and broke his neck on August 1, 1961.
