= David J. Kimball =

American sound engineer

- Occupation: Sound engineer
- Years active: 1978 – 1987

David J. Kimball is an American sound engineer. He was nominated for an Academy Award in the category Best Sound for the film Raging Bull.

== Selected filmography ==
- Raging Bull (1980)
