= Flagler, Colorado =

Statutory town in Colorado, US

- statutory town
- Town of Flagler
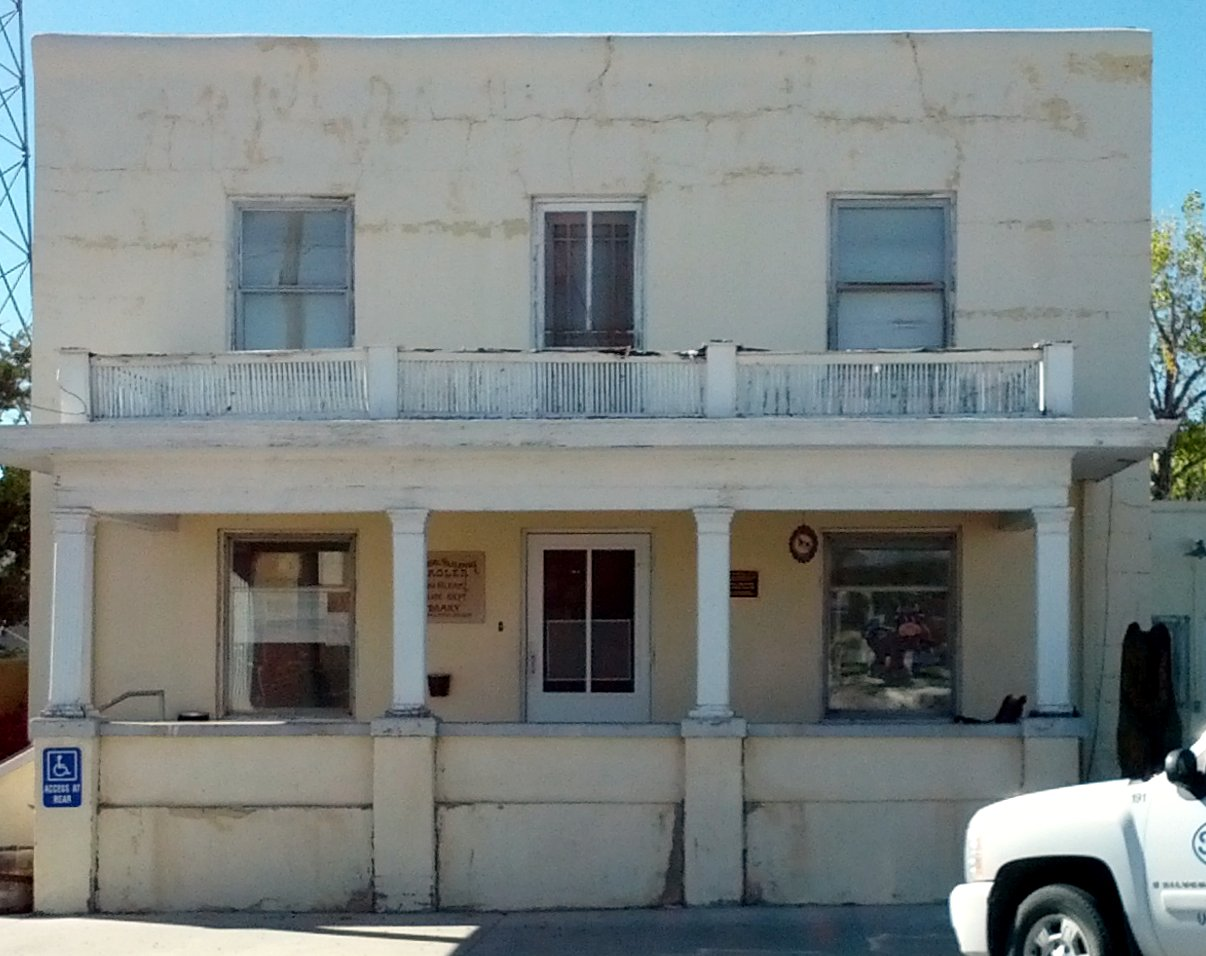
- The former Flagler Hospital, 2012.

- Location within Kit Carson County and Colorado
- Coordinates: 39°17′39″N 103°03′55″W
- Country: United States
- State: Colorado
- County: Kit Carson
- Founded: 1888
- Incorporated: November 2, 1916

Government
  - Type: Statutory town
  - Mayor: Tom Bredehoft

Area
  - Total: 1.370 sq mi (3.547 km^{2})
  - Land: 1.370 sq mi (3.547 km^{2})
  - Water: 0 sq mi (0.000 km^{2})
- Elevation: 4,941 ft (1,506 m)

Population (2020)
  - Total: 567
  - Density: 414/sq mi (160/km^{2})
- Time zone: UTC−07:00 (MST)
  - Summer (DST): UTC−06:00 (MDT)
- ZIP code: 80815
- Area code: 719
- GNIS town ID: 2412628
- FIPS code: 08-26765
- Website: flaglercolorado.com

Flagler is a statutory town in western Kit Carson County, Colorado, United States. The town population was 567 at the 2020 United States census. Flagler is near Exit 395 on I-70.

== History ==
The town was established in 1888 as a small settlement near the then-new Rock Island Railroad. The area has had several names, and prior to the settlement of the town, the location had been home to a combined general store and post office, owned by W.H. Lavington, and named Bowser in memory of the owner's favorite dog who had died. When the town was founded, the town was named Malowe after Rock Island Railroad attorney M. A. Lowe. The town was later renamed after Henry Flagler, railroad builder and oil man, at the request of his daughter who liked the area.

The Flagler, Colorado, post office opened on October 12, 1888, and the Town of Flagler was incorporated on November 2, 1916.

== Geography ==
At the 2020 United States census, the town had a total area of 876 acres (3.547 km^{2}), all of it land.

=== Climate ===
Climate data for Flagler, Colorado (1991–2020 normals, extremes 1919–1928, 1958–present)
Month	Jan	Feb	Mar	Apr	May	Jun	Jul	Aug	Sep	Oct	Nov	Dec	Year
Record high °F (°C)	78 (26)	80 (27)	84 (29)	90 (32)	99 (37)	107 (42)	104 (40)	104 (40)	99 (37)	93 (34)	81 (27)	76 (24)	107 (42)
Mean daily maximum °F (°C)	45.0 (7.2)	46.9 (8.3)	56.6 (13.7)	63.7 (17.6)	73.0 (22.8)	84.7 (29.3)	89.1 (31.7)	86.8 (30.4)	79.1 (26.2)	65.8 (18.8)	53.7 (12.1)	43.8 (6.6)	65.7 (18.7)
Daily mean °F (°C)	31.1 (−0.5)	33.0 (0.6)	41.8 (5.4)	49.1 (9.5)	58.7 (14.8)	69.3 (20.7)	74.3 (23.5)	72.4 (22.4)	64.2 (17.9)	50.9 (10.5)	39.6 (4.2)	30.4 (−0.9)	51.2 (10.7)
Mean daily minimum °F (°C)	17.1 (−8.3)	19.1 (−7.2)	27.0 (−2.8)	34.5 (1.4)	44.4 (6.9)	53.9 (12.2)	59.5 (15.3)	58.0 (14.4)	49.3 (9.6)	36.0 (2.2)	25.5 (−3.6)	17.0 (−8.3)	36.8 (2.7)
Record low °F (°C)	−29 (−34)	−25 (−32)	−20 (−29)	−4 (−20)	20 (−7)	30 (−1)	37 (3)	33 (1)	21 (−6)	−6 (−21)	−15 (−26)	−29 (−34)	−29 (−34)
Average precipitation inches (mm)	0.34 (8.6)	0.31 (7.9)	0.80 (20)	1.37 (35)	2.47 (63)	2.64 (67)	3.06 (78)	2.71 (69)	1.24 (31)	0.90 (23)	0.29 (7.4)	0.37 (9.4)	16.50 (419)
Average snowfall inches (cm)	5.1 (13)	3.8 (9.7)	3.9 (9.9)	3.4 (8.6)	0.6 (1.5)	0.0 (0.0)	0.0 (0.0)	0.0 (0.0)	0.4 (1.0)	1.0 (2.5)	2.4 (6.1)	3.9 (9.9)	24.5 (62)
Average precipitation days (≥ 0.01 in)	2.1	1.9	3.5	4.1	5.8	5.9	6.6	5.6	2.7	2.9	1.9	2.1	45.1
Average snowy days (≥ 0.1 in)	1.9	1.7	1.8	0.9	0.1	0.0	0.0	0.0	0.1	0.2	1.3	1.7	9.7
Source: NOAA

== Demographics ==
Historical population
Census	Pop.	Note	%±
1920	544		—
1930	540		−0.7%
1940	506		−6.3%
1950	793		56.7%
1960	693		−12.6%
1970	615		−11.3%
1980	550		−10.6%
1990	564		2.5%
2000	612		8.5%
2010	561		−8.3%
2020	567		1.1%
U.S. Decennial Census

As of the census of 2000, there were 612 people, 271 households, and 171 families residing in the town. The population density was 1,123.3 inhabitants per square mile (433.7/km^{2}). There were 319 housing units at an average density of 585.5 per square mile (226.1/km^{2}). The racial makeup of the town was 96.57% White, 2.29% Native American, 0.33% from other races, and 0.82% from two or more races. Hispanic or Latino of any race were 3.10% of the population.

There were 271 households, out of which 29.9% had children under the age of 18 living with them, 50.9% were married couples living together, 9.2% had a female householder with no husband present, and 36.9% were non-families. 35.1% of all households were made up of individuals, and 17.3% had someone living alone who was 65 years of age or older. The average household size was 2.23 and the average family size was 2.88.

In the town, the population was spread out, with 25.8% under the age of 18, 5.7% from 18 to 24, 23.2% from 25 to 44, 23.4% from 45 to 64, and 21.9% who were 65 years of age or older. The median age was 42 years. For every 100 females, there were 91.3 males. For every 100 females age 18 and over, there were 83.1 males.

The median income for a household in the town was $28,523, and the median income for a family was $43,542. Males had a median income of $29,821 versus $19,500 for females. The per capita income for the town was $16,770. About 4.3% of families and 8.1% of the population were below the poverty line, including 9.3% of those under age 18 and 7.3% of those age 65 or over.

== Economy ==
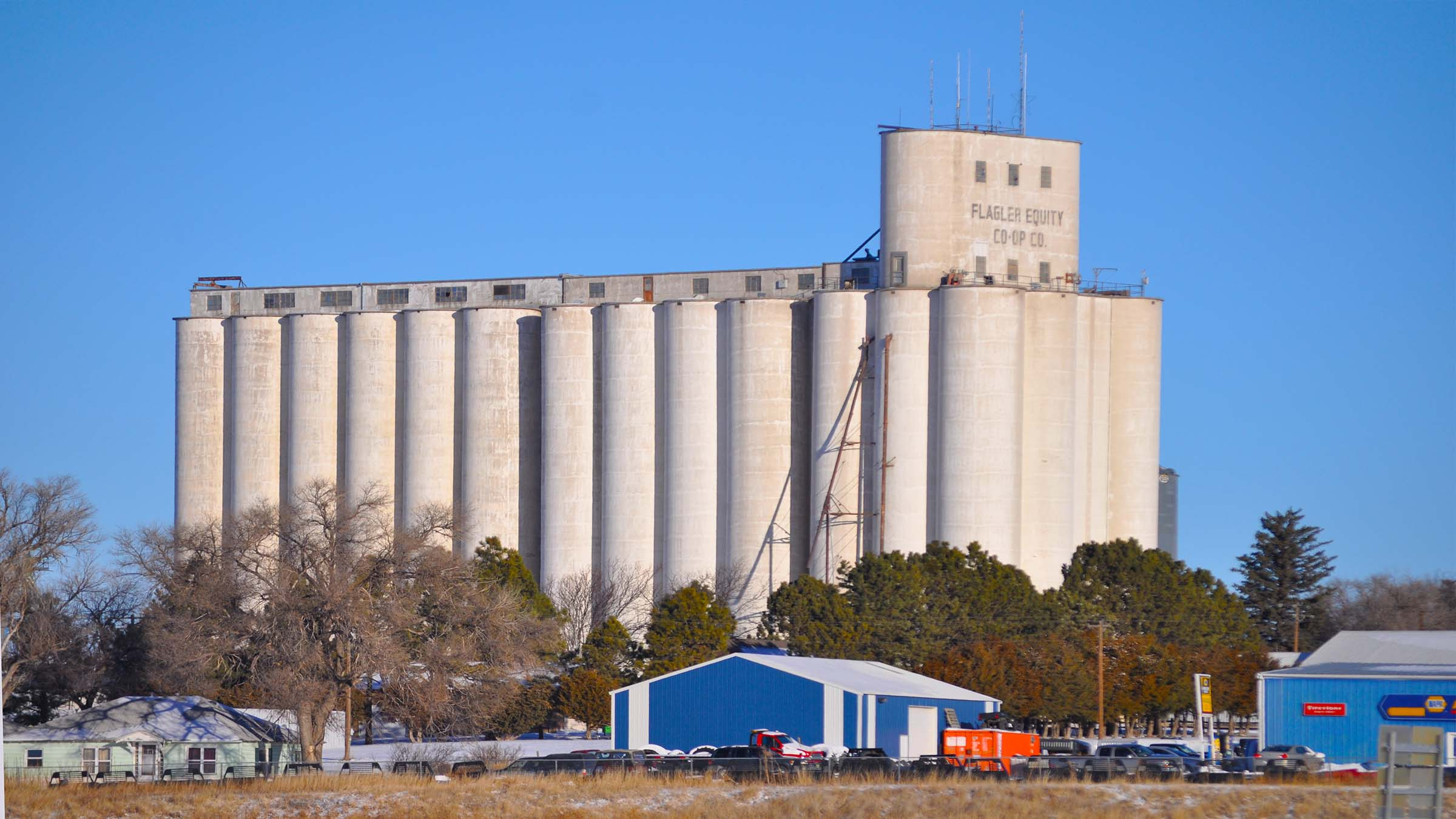
Grain Elevators in Flagler

The economy of Flagler and the surrounding area is composed largely of agriculture, specifically wheat and corn production. Flagler is also the self-proclaimed "Birdseed Capital of World," with a Wagner's Wild Bird Seed plant listed as the town's top private employer. Flagler is home to a Loaf 'N Jug convenience store, The Witt's Family (clothing and shoe) Store, Stone Communications (previously Lyle's TV & Radio), a small hotel, a small movie house, a local supermarket, The I-70 (1950's) Diner, and numerous churches. The Flagler area is also home to the Mullen pedal steel guitar factory on County Road MM, about 30 miles N.E. of the town.

The Town of Flagler is offering free land for business or industry.

== School ==
Arriba-Flagler Consolidated School District #20 educates local children in grades preschool through 12th, as well as children from nearby Arriba, Colorado. The school's mascot is the panther, and students compete in sports such as Six-man football, volleyball, basketball, baseball, and track. Flagler Senior High School is represented by the colors orange and black, and is consistently one of the top-performing schools in the state academically.

== Notable events ==
Flagler is the site of a tragic air show accident that occurred on September 15, 1951. A Timm N2T Tutor performing for Fall Festival Day lost control and impacted the show's spectators, killing twenty people.

== Notable residents ==
- Author Hal Borland moved to Flagler at the age 15 and attended high school in Flagler.
- Boxer Irish Bob Murphy was born in Flagler.

== See also ==
- List of municipalities in Colorado
