= Jimmy Reeves =

American boxer

Jimmy Reeves (April 4, 1918 – December 1974) was an American boxer from Cleveland, Ohio. He won the 1939 light heavyweight championship.

He gave Jake LaMotta his first defeat in a controversial decision on September 24, 1941, in a match that was briefly recreated in the film Raging Bull. Reeves' estate sued United Artists for compensation, but the complaint was dismissed. Reeves faced LaMotta two more times, winning on October 20, 1941 by decision and then losing on March 19, 1943, in what has been called LaMotta's "first boxing rivalry".
