= Tony Janiro =

American boxer (1926–1985)

Tony Janiro

Tony Janiro (born Anthony Gianiro; February 2, 1926 – February 21, 1985) was an American middleweight boxer from Youngstown, Ohio. Janiro never won a championship, although he faced many of the top fighters of his era. Despite his reputation as a playboy who avoided training, Janiro compiled a record of 83 wins (26 KOs), 11 losses, and two draws.

== Early life ==
Janiro was born in Springdale, Pennsylvania. His family relocated to Youngstown, Ohio, when he was four years old. He left Youngstown for New York at the age of 16 to pursue a career in boxing.

== Boxing career ==
Janiro received advice and assistance from fellow Youngstown native Lenny "Boom Boom" Mancini (father of Ray Mancini), who introduced Janiro to his manager, Frankie Jacobs, and boxing trainer Ray Arcel. In the 1940s, Janiro was ranked among the top 10 middleweights and fought such Hall of Famers as Rocky Graziano, Jake LaMotta, and Kid Gavilan. During one bout at Madison Square Garden, the young boxer was introduced to ringside fan Harry S. Truman, then President of the United States. Janiro had one draw with Graziano, who knocked him out in 1951. He fought from 1943 to 1952.

== Post-boxing ==
After his retirement, he worked as a bartender at the Neutral Corner, a bar located near Stillman's Gym that was frequented by boxing managers and trainers. (The bar is often referred to in journalist A.J. Liebling's boxing articles.) Several years before his death, Janiro returned to Youngstown, where he was employed at the Mahoning County Courthouse. In 1984, he was inducted into the Youngstown Curbstone Coaches Hall of Fame, and was honored at a testimonial banquet held in Boardman, Ohio. Speakers at the event included former boxing champions Willie Pep, Jake LaMotta, Beau Jack, and Carmen Basilio.

Janiro was portrayed by Kevin Mahon in Martin Scorsese's biopic of Jake LaMotta, Raging Bull (1980). In the film, a comment that Janiro looks handsome by LaMotta's wife, Vicky, provokes a brutal beating in their bout by LaMotta out of jealous rage.

== Death ==
Tony Janiro died of kidney failure after suffering a heart attack in his home in the spring of 1985. He was survived by his sister, Mrs. Amelia Marian; a brother, Frank of Youngstown, and granddaughter Tracy Janiro Zingaro. Funeral services for Janiro were held at St. Christine's Roman Catholic Church, in Youngstown.
