= Billy Fox (boxer) =

American boxer (1926–1986)

Personal information
- Born: William McKinley Fox; February 1, 1926 Tatums, Oklahoma, U.S.
- Died: January 1986 (aged 59) New York City, New York, U.S.
- Weight: Light Heavyweight

Boxing career
- Stance: Orthodox

Boxing record
- Total fights: 59
- Wins: 49
- Win by KO: 48
- Losses: 9
- Draws: 1

William McKinley Fox (February 1, 1926 – January 1986), better known as "Blackjack" Billy Fox, was an American light heavyweight boxer who is best known for having won a controversial fight against future middleweight champion Jake LaMotta.

== Early life ==
William McKinley Fox was born in Tatums, Oklahoma on February 1, 1926, to Melvin Calvin Fox (died 1984) and Beulah Carter (died 1933). After his mother died when he was a child, he was raised by his stepmother, Viola Harris Fox.

Fox enlisted for service in World War II in 1944, when he was 18. At the time, he was resident in Philadelphia, Pennsylvania.

== Boxing career ==
Billy Fox, known as "Blackjack", started off his career by winning 36 consecutive fights and holds the best knockout ratio in boxing history going 36 wins with 36 knockouts before he was knocked out by Gus Lesnevich in ten rounds for the world light heavyweight title. Fox had the champion hurt in round three. He would rack up 7 more wins, including a win in a bout thrown by Jake LaMotta. That fight was fixed by the notorious Frank "Blinky" Palermo, a member of the Philadelphia crime family, who owned Fox under the table. Fox then lost two fights in a row against Red Willis Applegate and Gus Lesnevich, to whom he lost in the first round by a knockout in 1:58 seconds, in a rematch that was also for the world light heavyweight title.

Fox would fight 12 more fights, and amass a record of 49 wins (48 by knockout), 9 losses, and 1 draw. His knockout streak of 42 fights is the second longest in boxing history.

== Personal life and death ==
Fox married Clara Rosemary Allen in Dauphin, Pennsylvania, on May 5, 1947. They met at the USO-Variety Club canteen whilst Fox was a soldier and Allen was a hostess.

In 1956, Fox was tracked down by Sports Illustrated journalists, at which point he was described as "living on the edges, desolate, vagrant, despairing". By July 1960, Fox was residing at a mental institution in Long Island, New York, and was said to be "seriously ill". He died in New York City in January 1986, at the age of 59.

== Popular culture ==
Billy Fox was portrayed in Martin Scorsese's Raging Bull by Eddie Mustafa Muhammad.
