= Danny Nardico =

American boxer and wrestler (1925–2010)

Personal information
- Born: July 3, 1925 Painesville, Ohio, U.S.
- Died: November 22, 2010 (aged 85) Sacramento, California, U.S.
- Height: 5 ft 9.5 in (1.77 m)
- Weight: Light heavyweight Heavyweight

Boxing career

Boxing record
- Total fights: 67
- Wins: 50
- Win by KO: 35
- Losses: 13
- Draws: 4
- No contests: 0

Daniel Richard (Danny) Nardico (July 3, 1925 – November 22, 2010) was an American professional boxer who was once ranked the fifth-best light heavyweight boxer by The Ring magazine. He was the only fighter to knock down Jake LaMotta. Nardico briefly entered wrestling after his boxing career.

== Biography ==
=== Early life ===
Danny Nardico was born on July 3, 1925, and attended Thomas W. Harvey High School in Painesville, Ohio. He played football at Harvey and was an all-league lineman. Nardico served in the United States Marine Corps and fought in both World War II and the Korean War. He was awarded two Purple Hearts and a Silver Star for his actions in Okinawa in 1945. He trained as a boxer under Willie Pep.

=== Career ===
In December 1952, The Ring ranked Nardico fifth in the light heavyweight class just prior to his fight with Jake LaMotta. Nardico knocked down the aging LaMotta in the seventh round. LaMotta got up, but his corner stopped the fight after that round and Nardico won by technical knockout. The knockdown was the first and only time LaMotta was floored in his entire career.

Nardico's five-year boxing career ended in 1954. He retired with 50 wins, 13 losses and four draws. Thirty-five wins came by knockout. In 1956, Nardico entered wrestling after training under Chuck Benson. He earned a draw in his first match against Saul Weingeroff. That same night, Nardico and Benson wrestled in a tag team match that ended when the teammates nearly got into a fight. In the following year, Nardico trained Benson for a boxing match against Leo Wallick.

=== Later life ===
After his retirement, Nardico worked as the recreational director at the Northern Nevada Correctional Center. The movie Raging Bull (1980) told LaMotta's story and Nardico became angry that his knockdown was omitted from the film. He moved to California late in life, where he died in 2010 after suffering from Alzheimer's disease for several years. He is buried at Sunset Lawn Chapel of the Chimes in Sacramento.
