= Jake LaMotta =

American boxer (1922–2017)

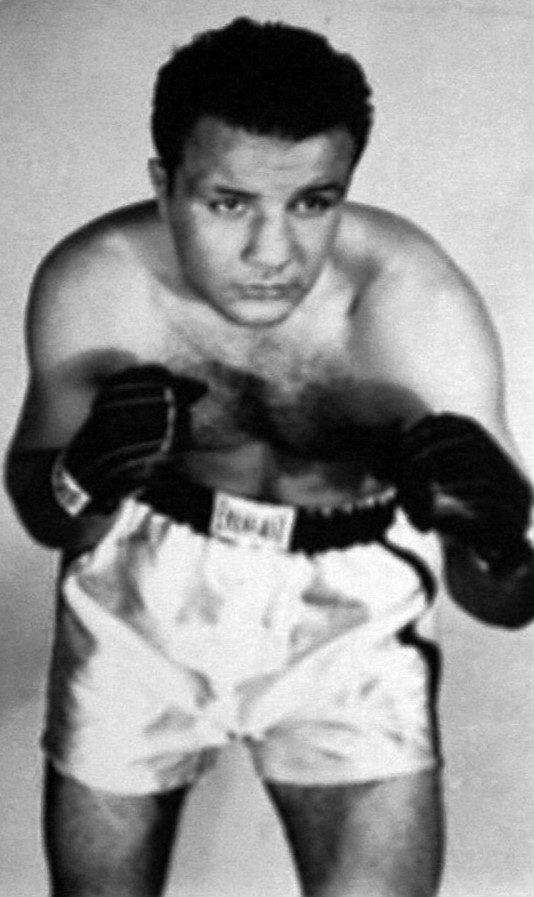
- LaMotta in a postcard dated 1952

Personal information
- Nicknames: The Bronx Bull; The Raging Bull
- Born: Giacobbe LaMotta; July 10, 1922 New York City, U.S.
- Died: September 19, 2017 (aged 95) Aventura, Florida, U.S.
- Height: 5 ft 8 in (173 cm)
- Weight: Middleweight; Light heavyweight

Boxing career
- Reach: 67 in (170 cm)
- Stance: Orthodox

Boxing record
- Total fights: 106
- Wins: 83
- Win by KO: 30
- Losses: 19
- Draws: 4

Giacobbe "Jake" LaMotta (July 10, 1922 – September 19, 2017) was an American professional boxer who was world middleweight champion between 1949 and 1951. Nicknamed "the Bronx Bull" or "Raging Bull" for his technique of constant stalking, brawling and inside fighting, he developed a reputation for being a "bully"; he was what is often referred to today as a swarmer and a slugger.

Due to his hard style of fighting, LaMotta often took as much as he dished out in an era of great middleweights. With a thick skull and jaw muscles, LaMotta was able to absorb incredible amounts of punishment over the course of his career, and is thought to have one of the greatest chins in boxing history. LaMotta's six-fight rivalry with Sugar Ray Robinson was one of the most notable in the sport. Although each fight was close and LaMotta dropped Robinson to the canvas multiple times, LaMotta won only one of the bouts. He was also awarded an early version of the Hickok Belt—then presented exclusively to boxers—in 1949 after capturing the world middleweight title.

LaMotta, who lived a turbulent life in and out of the ring, was managed by his brother Joey. He was ranked 52nd on Ring Magazine's list of the "80 Best Fighters of the Last 80 Years", and also ranked amongst its list of the 10 greatest middleweights of all time. LaMotta was inducted into the International Boxing Hall of Fame in the inaugural class of 1990.

LaMotta's autobiography was adapted into the 1980 Martin Scorsese film Raging Bull. It went on to be nominated for eight Academy Awards, with Robert De Niro winning Best Actor for his portrayal of LaMotta.

== Early life ==
LaMotta was born on the Lower East Side of New York City on July 10, 1922, to Italian parents, Elizabeth (Merluzzo) and Giuseppe "Joseph" LaMotta. Many sources had reported his year of birth as 1921, but his daughter Christi claimed it was in fact 1922. His mother was born in the United States to Italian immigrants, while his father was an immigrant from Messina, Sicily, who came with family including Jake's older brother Joseph. The family lived briefly in Philadelphia before returning to New York City and settling in the Bronx.

Jake's father forced the boy to fight other boys in order to entertain neighborhood adults, who threw pocket change into the ring. LaMotta's father collected the money and used it to help pay the rent. One of LaMotta's cousins on his father's side was Richard LaMotta, who became an entrepreneur and creator of the Chipwich ice cream treat.

LaMotta learned to box while in a reformatory in upstate New York, where he'd been sent for attempted robbery. Afterward, he fought undefeated in amateur bouts, turning professional at age 19 in 1941. During World War II, he was rejected for military service due to a childhood mastoid operation on one of his ears which affected his hearing.

== Boxing career ==
As a middleweight in his first fifteen bouts, LaMotta went 14–0–1 (3 KOs). On September 24, 1941, he almost defeated Jimmy Reeves by a knockout in Reeves' hometown of Cleveland, Ohio, but the referee counted to nine before he was interrupted by the boxing bell, signaling the end of the match, and by a split decision, LaMotta controversially lost to Reeves, despite the latter being knocked down. Chaos erupted after the decision was announced. Fights broke out around the ring and the crowd continued to riot for 20 minutes. The arena's organist unsuccessfully tried to calm down the crowd by playing the "Star Spangled Banner". However, while the crowd continued to riot, the violence outside the ring led to many arrests.

One month later, LaMotta and Reeves fought again in the same arena. LaMotta lost a much less controversial decision. A third match between the two took place on March 19, 1943, in Detroit, Michigan. The first five rounds were close, though Reeves was struggling in the fourth. In the sixth round, LaMotta floored Reeves, who was down for only a second. Once the fight resumed, LaMotta landed a left on Reeves' chin, sending him down face-first. Reeves was blinking his eyes and shaking his head as the referee counted him out.

=== LaMotta vs. Robinson I–V ===
LaMotta fought Sugar Ray Robinson in Robinson's middleweight debut at Madison Square Garden, New York City, October 2, 1942. LaMotta knocked Robinson down in the first round of the fight. Robinson got up and took control over much of the fight, winning via a unanimous 10-round decision.

A 10-round rematch took place February 5, 1943, at Olympia Stadium in Detroit, Michigan. In the eighth round, LaMotta landed a right to Robinson's head and a left to his body, sending him through the ropes. Robinson was saved by the bell at the count of nine. LaMotta, who was already leading on the scorecards before knocking Robinson out of the ring, pummeled and outpointed him for the rest of the fight. Robinson had trouble keeping LaMotta at bay. LaMotta won via unanimous decision, giving Robinson the first defeat of his career.

The victory was short-lived, as the two met on February 26, 1943, in what was another 10-round fight, once again at Olympia Stadium in Robinson's former home of Detroit. Robinson was knocked down for a nine-count in Round 7. Robinson later stated, "He really hurt me with a left in the seventh round. I was a little dazed and decided to stay on the deck." Robinson won the close fight by unanimous decision, using a dazzling left jab and jarring uppercuts. LaMotta said the fight was given to Robinson because he would be inducted into the army the next day.

A fourth fight, the duo's final 10 rounder, took place nearly two years after the third, on February 23, 1945, at Madison Square Garden, New York. Robinson won again by a unanimous decision.

LaMotta and Robinson had their fifth bout at Comiskey Park, Chicago, Illinois on September 26, 1945. Robinson won by a very controversial split decision, contested over 12 rounds. The decision was severely booed by the 14,755 people in attendance. LaMotta later said in his autobiography that the decision was widely criticized by several newspapers and boxing publishers. Robinson said afterward, "This was the toughest fight I've ever had with LaMotta."

=== LaMotta vs. Fox ===
On November 14, 1947, LaMotta was knocked out in the fourth round by Billy Fox. Suspecting the fight was fixed, the New York State Athletic Commission withheld purses for the fight and suspended LaMotta. The fight with Fox would come back to haunt him later in life, during a case with the Federal Bureau of Investigation.

In his testimony and in his later book, LaMotta admitted to throwing the fight to gain favor with the Mafia. All involved agreed the fix was obvious and their staging inept.

As LaMotta wrote,

The first round, a couple of belts to his head, and I see a glassy look coming over his eyes. Jesus Christ, a couple of jabs and he's going to fall down? I began to panic a little. I was supposed to be throwing a fight to this guy, and it looked like I was going to end up holding him on his feet... By [the fourth round], if there was anybody in the Garden who didn't know what was happening, he must have been dead drunk.

The thrown fight and a payment of $20,000 to the Mafia got LaMotta his title bout against World Middleweight Champion Marcel Cerdan.

=== LaMotta vs. Cerdan ===
LaMotta won the World Middleweight title on June 16, 1949, in Detroit, Michigan, defeating Frenchman Marcel Cerdan. LaMotta won the first round (in which he knocked Cerdan down), Cerdan the second, and the third was even. At that point it became clear that Cerdan had dislocated his arm; he gave up before the start of the tenth round. LaMotta damaged his left hand in the fifth round, but still landed 104 punches in the ninth round, whereas Cerdan hardly threw a punch. The official score had LaMotta as winner by a knockout in ten rounds because the tenth round had begun when Cerdan announced he was quitting. A rematch was arranged, but as Cerdan flew back to the United States for the fight, his Air France Lockheed Constellation crashed in the Azores, killing everyone on board.

=== World Middleweight Champion ===
LaMotta made his first title defense against Tiberio Mitri on July 7, 1950, at Madison Square Garden, New York. LaMotta retained his title via unanimous decision. LaMotta's next defense came on September 13, 1950, against Laurent Dauthuille. Dauthuille had previously beaten LaMotta by decision before LaMotta became world champion. By the fifteenth round, Dauthuille was ahead on all scorecards (72–68, 74–66, 71–69) and seemed to be about to repeat a victory against LaMotta. LaMotta hit Dauthuille with a barrage of punches that sent him down against the ropes toward the end of the round. Dauthuille was counted out with 13 seconds left in the fight. This fight was named Fight of the Year for 1950 by The Ring magazine.

=== Saint Valentine's Day Massacre of boxing ===
The sixth and final fight between LaMotta and Robinson took place at Chicago Stadium. This fight was scheduled for 15 rounds and was for the middleweight title. Held on February 14, 1951, Saint Valentine's Day, the fight became known as boxing's version of the Saint Valentine's Day Massacre. In the last few rounds, LaMotta began to take a horrible beating and was soon unable to defend himself from Robinson's powerful blows. But LaMotta refused to go down. Robinson won by a technical knockout in the 13th round, when the fight was stopped.

=== Light heavyweight ===
LaMotta moved up to light heavyweight after losing his world middleweight title. He had poor results at first. He lost his debut against Bob Murphy, lost a split decision to Norman Hayes, and drew with Gene Hairston in his first three bouts. In his next three fights, LaMotta had rematches with Hayes, Hairston, and Murphy, and defeated all of them by unanimous decisions.

On December 31, 1952, LaMotta had his next fight against Danny Nardico. He knocked LaMotta down for the only time in his career (not counting his thrown 1947 fight) by a right hand in the seventh round. LaMotta got up and was beaten against a corner by Nardico until the bell rang. LaMotta's corner stopped the bout before the eighth round began.

Following that fight, LaMotta took time off; when he returned, in early 1954, he knocked out his first two opponents, Johnny Pretzie (TKO 4) and Al McCoy (KO 1), but a controversial split decision loss to Billy Kilgore on April 14, 1954, convinced him to retire.

== Post-boxing ==
After retiring from the ring, LaMotta owned and managed a bar at 1120 Collins Ave in Miami Beach. He also became a stage actor and comedian. In 1958 he was arrested and charged with introducing men to an underage girl at a club he owned in Miami. He was convicted and served six months on a chain gang, although he maintained his innocence.

In 1960 LaMotta was called to testify before a U.S. Senate sub-committee that was looking into underworld influence on boxing. He testified that he had thrown his bout with Billy Fox so that the mob would arrange a title bout for him.

LaMotta appeared in more than 15 films, including The Hustler (1961) with Paul Newman and Jackie Gleason, in which he had a role as a bartender. He appeared in several episodes of the NBC police comedy Car 54 Where Are You? (1961–63). A lifelong baseball fan, he organized the Jake LaMotta All-Star Team in the Bronx. The LaMotta team played in Sterling Oval which was located between 165th and 164th Streets between Clay and Teller Avenue.

In 1965, LaMotta appeared as "Big Jule" in the New York City Center production of Guys and Dolls for 15 performances alongside Alan King and Jerry Orbach.

In his old age, LaMotta lived mostly in a northern suburb of Miami, FL, alternating to Bisbee, Arizona during the rainy Florida summer season, where he knew comedian Doug Stanhope.

== Fighting style ==
LaMotta is recognized as having had one of the best chins in boxing. He rolled with punches, minimizing their force and damage when they landed, but he was also able to absorb many blows. In the Saint Valentine's Day Massacre, his sixth bout with Robinson, LaMotta suffered numerous severe blows to the head. Commentators could be heard saying "No man can take this kind of punishment!" But LaMotta did not go down. The fight was stopped by the referee in the 13th round, declaring it a TKO victory for Robinson.

LaMotta was one of the first boxers to adopt the "bully" style of fighting, in that he always stayed close and in punching range of his opponent, by stalking him around the ring, and sacrificed taking punches himself in order to land his own shots. Due to his aggressive, unrelenting style he was known as "The Bronx Bull". He boasted "No son-of-a-bitch ever knocked me off my feet", but that claim was ended in December 1952 at the hands of Danny Nardico when Nardico caught him with a hard right in the seventh round. LaMotta fell into the ropes and went down. After regaining his footing, he was unable to come out for the next round.

== Raging Bull: My Story ==
Raging Bull: My Story is a 1970 second edition of LaMotta's memoir. The autobiographical details include his life as a young teenage criminal; his reformation in prison; his extensive career as an amateur and professional boxer; his struggles with organized crime who kept a boxing title out of reach; and his jealous obsession with his wife, Vikki. The book details his life, from childhood until the end of his fame.

The first edition is:

- La Motta, Jake with Carter, Joseph and Savage, Peter (1970). Raging Bull: My Story. Englewood Cliffs, N.J.: Prentice-Hall [1970]. ISBN 0-13-752527-3.

== Raging Bull ==
Hollywood executives approached LaMotta with the idea of a movie about his life, based on his 1970 memoir Raging Bull: My Story. The film, Raging Bull, released in 1980, was a box-office bomb, but eventually received overwhelming critical acclaim for both director Martin Scorsese and actor Robert De Niro, who gained about 60 pounds during the shooting of the film to play the older LaMotta in later scenes.

To accurately portray the younger LaMotta, De Niro trained with LaMotta until LaMotta felt he was ready to box professionally. De Niro lived in Paris for three months, eating at the finest restaurants in order to gain sufficient weight to portray LaMotta after retirement. De Niro won the Academy Award for Best Actor for his performance.

== Later life ==
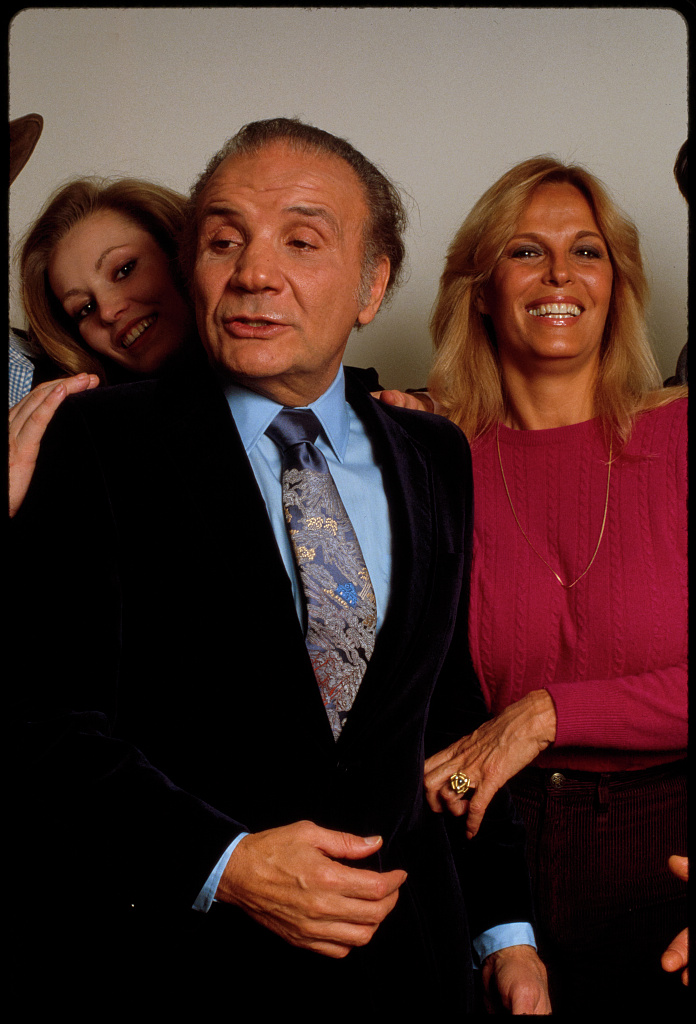
LaMotta in the 1980s, with former wife Vikki LaMotta, right, actress Cathy Moriarty, left

LaMotta had a troubled personal life, including an early spell in a reformatory, and was married seven times. He admitted to having raped a woman, having beaten his wives and coming close to beating a man to death during a robbery.

In February 1998, LaMotta's elder son, Jake LaMotta Jr., died of liver cancer. In September 1998, his younger son, Joseph LaMotta, died aged 49 in the crash of Swissair Flight 111.

His nephew John LaMotta fought in the heavyweight-novice class of the 2001 Golden Gloves championship tournament. John later became an actor, and one of his roles was as "Duke", who ran the bar of that name featured in the television comedy series Frasier. Another nephew, William Lustig, is a well-known director and producer of horror films and the president of Blue Underground, Inc.

LaMotta had four daughters, including Christi by his second wife Vikki LaMotta and Stephanie by his fourth wife Dimitria. He married his seventh wife, his longtime fiancée Denise Baker, on January 4, 2013. LaMotta remained active on the speaking and autograph circuit, and published several books about his career, his life, and his fights with Robinson.

LaMotta appeared in a 50-minute New York City stage production, Lady and the Champ, in July 2012. The production focused on LaMotta's boxing career, and was criticized by The New York Times as poorly executed and a "bizarre debacle".

LaMotta is the subject of a documentary directed and produced by Greg Olliver. The film features an appearance by Mike Tyson among other notable athletes, actors and Jake's family and friends. Also in production was a sequel to Raging Bull, although MGM filed suit to halt the project, saying that LaMotta did not have the right to make a sequel. The lawsuit was settled on July 31, 2012, when LaMotta agreed to change the title of the film to The Bronx Bull.

LaMotta: The Bronx Bull stars actor William Forsythe as LaMotta, while Paul Sorvino plays his father. It also features Joe Mantegna, Tom Sizemore, Penelope Ann Miller, Natasha Henstridge, Joey Diaz and Ray Wise.

== Death ==
LaMotta died on September 19, 2017, from complications of pneumonia in a nursing home in Florida, at the age of 95.

== Professional boxing record ==
106 fights	83 wins	19 losses
By knockout	30	4
By decision	53	15
Draws	4	

No.	Result	Record	Opponent	Type	Round, time	Date	Age	Location	Notes
106	Loss	83–19–4	Billy Kilgore	SD	10	April 14, 1954	31 years, 278 days	Auditorium, Miami Beach, Florida, U.S.	
105	Win	83–18–4	Al McCoy	KO	1 (10), 1:10	April 3, 1954	31 years, 267 days	Armory, Charlotte, North Carolina, U.S.	
104	Win	82–18–4	Johnny Pretzie	TKO	4 (10), 1:42	Mar 11, 1954	31 years, 244 days	Legion Arena, West Palm Beach, Florida, U.S.	
103	Loss	81–18–4	Danny Nardico	RTD	7 (10)	Dec 31, 1952	30 years, 174 days	Coliseum, Coral Gables, Florida, U.S.	
102	Win	81–17–4	Bob Murphy	UD	10	Jun 11, 1952	29 years, 337 days	Olympia Stadium, Detroit, Michigan, U.S.	
101	Win	80–17–4	Eugene Hairston	UD	10	May 21, 1952	29 years, 316 days	Olympia Stadium, Detroit, Michigan, U.S.	
100	Win	79–17–4	Norman Hayes	UD	10	April 9, 1952	29 years, 274 days	Olympia Stadium, Detroit, Michigan, U.S.	
99	Draw	78–17–4	Eugene Hairston	PTS	10	Mar 5, 1952	29 years, 239 days	Olympia Stadium, Detroit, Michigan, U.S.	
98	Loss	78–17–3	Norman Hayes	SD	10	Jan 28, 1952	29 years, 202 days	Boston Garden, Boston, Massachusetts, U.S.	
97	Loss	78–16–3	Irish Bob Murphy	RTD	7 (10)	Jun 27, 1951	28 years, 352 days	Yankee Stadium, Bronx, New York, U.S.	
96	Loss	78–15–3	Sugar Ray Robinson	TKO	13 (15), 2:04	Feb 14, 1951	28 years, 219 days	Chicago Stadium, Chicago, Illinois, U.S.	Lost NYSAC, NBA, and The Ring middleweight titles
95	Win	78–14–3	Laurent Dauthuille	KO	15 (15), 2:47	Sep 13, 1950	28 years, 65 days	Olympia Stadium, Detroit, Michigan, U.S.	Retained NYSAC, NBA, and The Ring middleweight titles
94	Win	77–14–3	Tiberio Mitri	UD	15	Jul 12, 1950	28 years, 2 days	Madison Square Garden, New York, U.S.	Retained NYSAC, NBA, and The Ring middleweight titles
93	Win	76–14–3	Joe Taylor	UD	10	May 4, 1950	27 years, 298 days	State Fair Coliseum, Syracuse, New York, U.S.	
92	Win	75–14–3	Chuck Hunter	TKO	6 (10), 0:59	Mar 28, 1950	27 years, 261 days	Arena, Cleveland, Ohio, U.S.	
91	Win	74–14–3	Dick Wagner	TKO	9 (10), 2:40	Feb 3, 1950	27 years, 208 days	Olympia Stadium, Detroit, Michigan, U.S.	
90	Loss	73–14–3	Robert Villemain	UD	10	Dec 9, 1949	27 years, 152 days	Madison Square Garden, New York, U.S.	
89	Win	73–13–3	Marcel Cerdan	RTD	9 (15)	Jun 16, 1949	26 years, 341 days	Briggs Stadium, Detroit, Michigan, U.S.	Won NYSAC, NBA and The Ring middleweight titles
88	Win	72–13–3	Joey DeJohn	TKO	8 (10), 2:41	May 18, 1949	26 years, 312 days	State Fair Coliseum, Syracuse, New York, U.S.	
87	Win	71–13–3	O'Neill Bell	TKO	4 (10), 1:40	April 18, 1949	26 years, 282 days	Olympia Stadium, Detroit, Michigan, U.S.	
86	Win	70–13–3	Robert Villemain	SD	12	Mar 25, 1949	26 years, 258 days	Madison Square Garden, New York, U.S.	
85	Loss	69–13–3	Laurent Dauthuille	UD	10	Feb 21, 1949	26 years, 226 days	Forum, Montreal, Quebec, Canada.	
84	Win	69–12–3	Tommy Yarosz	UD	10	Dec 3, 1948	26 years, 146 days	Madison Square Garden, New York, U.S.	
83	Win	68–12–3	Vern Lester	SD	10	Oct 18, 1948	26 years, 100 days	Eastern Parkway Arena, Brooklyn, New York, U.S.	
82	Win	67–12–3	Johnny Colan	TKO	10 (10), 1:32	Oct 1, 1948	26 years, 83 days	St. Nicholas Rink, New York, U.S.	
81	Win	66–12–3	Burl Charity	TKO	5 (10)	Sep 7, 1948	26 years, 59 days	Park Arena, Bronx, New York, U.S.	
80	Win	65–12–3	Ken Stribling	TKO	5 (10), 2:46	Jun 1, 1948	25 years, 327 days	Griffith Stadium, District of Columbia, U.S.	
79	Loss	64–12–3	Billy Fox	TKO	4 (10)	Nov 14, 1947	25 years, 127 days	Madison Square Garden, New York, U.S.	
78	Loss	64–11–3	Cecil Hudson	SD	10	Sep 3, 1947	25 years, 55 days	Comiskey Park, Chicago, Illinois, U.S.	
77	Win	64–10–3	Tony Janiro	UD	10	Jun 6, 1947	24 years, 331 days	Madison Square Garden, New York, U.S.	
76	Win	63–10–3	Tommy Bell	UD	10	Mar 14, 1947	24 years, 247 days	Madison Square Garden, New York, U.S.	
75	Win	62–10–3	Anton Raadik	UD	10	Dec 6, 1946	24 years, 149 days	Chicago Stadium, Chicago, Illinois, U.S.	
74	Win	61–10–3	O'Neill Bell	KO	2 (10), 2:32	Oct 25, 1946	24 years, 107 days	Olympia Stadium, Detroit, Michigan, U.S.	
73	Win	60–10–3	Bob Satterfield	KO	7 (10), 1:50	Sep 12, 1946	24 years, 64 days	Wrigley Field, Chicago, Illinois, U.S.	
72	Win	59–10–3	Holman Williams	UD	10	Aug 7, 1946	24 years, 28 days	University of Detroit Stadium, Detroit, Michigan, U.S.	
71	Draw	58–10–3	Jimmy Edgar	PTS	10	Jun 13, 1946	23 years, 338 days	University of Detroit Stadium, Detroit, Michigan, U.S.	
70	Win	58–10–2	Joe Reddick	UD	10	May 24, 1946	23 years, 318 days	Arena, Boston, Massachusetts, U.S.	
69	Win	57–10–2	Marcus Lockman	UD	10	Mar 29, 1946	23 years, 262 days	Boston Garden, Boston, Massachusetts, U.S.	
68	Win	56–10–2	Tommy Bell	UD	10	Jan 11, 1946	23 years, 185 days	Madison Square Garden, New York, U.S.	
67	Win	55–10–2	Charley Parham	TKO	6 (10), 0:59	Dec 7, 1945	23 years, 150 days	Chicago Stadium, Chicago, Illinois, U.S.	
66	Win	54–10–2	Walter Woods	KO	8 (10), 1:33	Nov 23, 1945	23 years, 136 days	Boston Garden, Boston, Massachusetts, U.S.	
65	Win	53–10–2	Coolidge Miller	KO	3 (10), 2:51	Nov 13, 1945	23 years, 126 days	Park Arena, Bronx, New York, U.S.	
64	Loss	52–10–2	Sugar Ray Robinson	SD	12	Sep 26, 1945	23 years, 78 days	Comiskey Park, Chicago, Illinois, U.S.	
63	Win	52–9–2	George Kochan	TKO	9 (10), 0:54	Sep 7, 1945	23 years, 59 days	Madison Square Garden, New York, U.S.	
62	Win	51–9–2	José Basora	TKO	9 (10)	Aug 10, 1945	23 years, 31 days	Madison Square Garden, New York, U.S.	
61	Win	50–9–2	Tommy Bell	UD	10	Jul 6, 1945	22 years, 361 days	Madison Square Garden, New York, U.S.	
60	Win	49–9–2	Bert Lytell	SD	10	April 27, 1945	22 years, 291 days	Boston Garden, Boston, Massachusetts, U.S.	
59	Win	48–9–2	Vic Dellicurti	UD	10	April 20, 1945	22 years, 284 days	St. Nicholas Rink, New York, U.S.	
58	Win	47–9–2	George Costner	KO	6 (10)	Mar 26, 1945	22 years, 259 days	Chicago Stadium, Chicago, Illinois, U.S.	
57	Win	46–9–2	Lou Schwartz	KO	1 (10), 2:30	Mar 19, 1945	22 years, 252 days	U.S.O. Auditorium, Norfolk, Virginia, U.S.	
56	Loss	45–9–2	Sugar Ray Robinson	UD	10	Feb 23, 1945	22 years, 228 days	Madison Square Garden, New York, U.S.	
55	Win	45–8–2	George Kochan	TKO	9 (10)	Nov 3, 1944	22 years, 116 days	Olympia Stadium, Detroit, Michigan, U.S.	
54	Win	44–8–2	George Kochan	UD	10	Sep 29, 1944	22 years, 81 days	Olympia Stadium, Detroit, Michigan, U.S.	
53	Loss	43–8–2	Lloyd Marshall	UD	10	April 21, 1944	21 years, 286 days	Arena, Cleveland, Ohio, U.S.	
52	Win	43–7–2	Lou Woods	SD	10	Mar 31, 1944	21 years, 265 days	Chicago Stadium, Chicago, Illinois, U.S.	
51	Win	42–7–2	Coley Welch	UD	10	Mar 17, 1944	21 years, 251 days	Boston Garden, Boston, Massachusetts, U.S.	
50	Win	41–7–2	Ossie Harris	SD	10	Feb 25, 1944	21 years, 230 days	Olympia Stadium, Detroit, Michigan, U.S.	
49	Win	40–7–2	Ossie Harris	SD	10	Jan 28, 1944	21 years, 202 days	Olympia Stadium, Detroit, Michigan, U.S.	
48	Win	39–7–2	Fritzie Zivic	UD	10	Jan 14, 1944	21 years, 188 days	Olympia Stadium, Detroit, Michigan, U.S.	
47	Win	38–7–2	Fritzie Zivic	SD	10	Nov 12, 1943	21 years, 125 days	Madison Square Garden, New York, U.S.	
46	Win	37–7–2	Johnny Walker	TKO	2 (10), 0:53	Oct 11, 1943	21 years, 93 days	Convention Hall, Philadelphia, Pennsylvania, U.S.	
45	Win	36–7–2	José Basora	UD	10	Sep 17, 1943	21 years, 69 days	Olympia Stadium, Detroit, Michigan, U.S.	
44	Loss	35–7–2	Fritzie Zivic	SD	15	Jul 12, 1943	21 years, 2 days	Forbes Field, Pittsburgh, Pennsylvania, U.S.	
43	Win	35–6–2	Fritzie Zivic	SD	10	Jun 10, 1943	20 years, 335 days	Forbes Field, Pittsburgh, Pennsylvania, U.S.	
42	Win	34–6–2	Tony Ferrara	KO	6 (10)	May 12, 1943	20 years, 306 days	Music Hall Arena, Cincinnati, Ohio, U.S.	
41	Win	33–6–2	Ossie Harris	UD	10	Mar 30, 1943	20 years, 263 days	Duquesne Gardens, Pittsburgh, Pennsylvania, U.S.	
40	Win	32–6–2	Jimmy Reeves	KO	6 (10)	Mar 19, 1943	20 years, 252 days	Olympia Stadium, Detroit, Michigan, U.S.	
39	Loss	31–6–2	Sugar Ray Robinson	UD	10	Feb 26, 1943	20 years, 231 days	Olympia Stadium, Detroit, Michigan, U.S.	
38	Win	31–5–2	Sugar Ray Robinson	UD	10	Feb 5, 1943	20 years, 210 days	Olympia Stadium, Detroit, Michigan, U.S.	
37	Win	30–5–2	Charley Hayes	TKO	6 (10)	Jan 22, 1943	20 years, 196 days	Olympia Stadium, Detroit, Michigan, U.S.	
36	Win	29–5–2	California Jackie Wilson	PTS	10	Jan 15, 1943	20 years, 189 days	Madison Square Garden, New York, U.S.	
35	Win	28–5–2	Jimmy Edgar	SD	10	Jan 1, 1943	20 years, 175 days	Olympia Stadium, Detroit, Michigan, U.S.	
34	Win	27–5–2	Henryk Chmielewski	UD	10	Nov 6, 1942	20 years, 119 days	Mechanics Building, Boston, Massachusetts, U.S.	
33	Win	26–5–2	Bill McDowell	TKO	5 (8), 0:44	Oct 20, 1942	20 years, 102 days	Broadway Arena, Brooklyn, New York, U.S.	
32	Loss	25–5–2	Sugar Ray Robinson	UD	10	Oct 2, 1942	20 years, 84 days	Madison Square Garden, New York, U.S.	
31	Win	25–4–2	Vic Dellicurti	PTS	10	Sep 8, 1942	20 years, 60 days	New York Coliseum, Bronx, New York, U.S.	
30	Win	24–4–2	Jimmy Edgar	PTS	10	Aug 28, 1942	20 years, 49 days	Madison Square Garden, New York, U.S.	
29	Win	23–4–2	Lorenzo Strickland	PTS	8	Jul 28, 1942	20 years, 18 days	New York Coliseum, Bronx, New York, U.S.	
28	Loss	22–4–2	José Basora	PTS	10	Jun 16, 1942	19 years, 341 days	New York Coliseum, Bronx, New York, U.S.	
27	Win	22–3–2	Vic Dellicurti	PTS	10	Jun 2, 1942	19 years, 327 days	New York Coliseum, Bronx, New York, U.S.	
26	Draw	21–3–2	José Basora	PTS	10	May 12, 1942	19 years, 306 days	New York Coliseum, Bronx, New York, U.S.	
25	Win	21–3-1	Buddy O'Dell	PTS	10	April 21, 1942	19 years, 285 days	New York Coliseum, Bronx, New York, U.S.	
24	Win	20–3–1	Lou Schwartz	KO	9 (10)	April 7, 1942	19 years, 271 days	New York Coliseum, Bronx, New York, U.S.	
23	Win	19–3–1	Lorenzo Strickland	PTS	10	Mar 18, 1942	19 years, 251 days	New York Coliseum, Bronx, New York, U.S.	
22	Win	18–3–1	Frankie Jamison	PTS	8	Mar 3, 1942	19 years, 236 days	New York Coliseum, Bronx, New York, U.S.	
21	Win	17–3–1	Frankie Jamison	PTS	8	Jan 27, 1942	19 years, 201 days	New York Coliseum, Bronx, New York, U.S.	
20	Loss	16–3–1	Nate Bolden	MD	10	Dec 22, 1941	19 years, 165 days	Marigold Gardens, Chicago, Illinois, U.S.	
19	Win	16–2–1	Jimmy Casa	PTS	6	Nov 14, 1941	19 years, 127 days	Madison Square Garden, New York, U.S.	
18	Loss	15–2–1	Jimmy Reeves	UD	10	Oct 20, 1941	19 years, 102 days	Arena, Cleveland, Ohio, U.S.	
17	Win	15–1–1	Lorenzo Strickland	PTS	8	Oct 7, 1941	19 years, 89 days	Westchester County Center, White Plains, New York, U.S.	
16	Loss	14–1–1	Jimmy Reeves	SD	10	Sep 24, 1941	19 years, 76 days	Arena, Cleveland, Ohio, U.S.	
15	Win	14–0–1	Cliff Koerkle	PTS	6	Aug 11, 1941	19 years, 32 days	New York Coliseum, Bronx, New York, U.S.	
14	Draw	13–0–1	Joe Shikula	PTS	6	Aug 5, 1941	19 years, 26 days	Queensboro Arena, Long Island City, Queens, New York, U.S.	
13	Win	13–0	Joe Baynes	PTS	6	Jul 15, 1941	19 years, 5 days	Queensboro Arena, Long Island City, Queens, New York, U.S.	
12	Win	12–0	Johnny Morris	KO	3 (6)	Jun 23, 1941	18 years, 348 days	Starlight Park, Bronx, New York, U.S.	
11	Win	11–0	Lorenzo Strickland	PTS	6	Jun 16, 1941	18 years, 341 days	Starlight Park, Bronx, New York, U.S.	
10	Win	10–0	Lorenzo Strickland	PTS	4	Jun 9, 1941	18 years, 334 days	Queensboro Arena, Woodhaven, Queens, New York, U.S.	
9	Win	9–0	Johnny Morris	PTS	4	May 27, 1941	18 years, 321 days	New York Coliseum, Bronx, New York, U.S.	
8	Win	8–0	Johnny Cihlar	PTS	4	May 20, 1941	18 years, 314 days	Broadway Arena, Brooklyn, New York, U.S.	
7	Win	7–0	Monroe Crewe	PTS	4	April 26, 1941	18 years, 290 days	Ridgewood Grove, Brooklyn, New York, U.S.	
6	Win	6–0	Lorne McCarthy	PTS	4	April 22, 1941	18 years, 286 days	Westchester County Center, White Plains, New York, U.S.	
5	Win	5–0	Stanley Goicz	PTS	4	April 15, 1941	18 years, 279 days	Westchester County Center, White Plains, New York, U.S.	
4	Win	4–0	Joe Fredericks	TKO	1 (4), 1:36	April 8, 1941	18 years, 272 days	Westchester County Center, White Plains, New York, U.S.	
3	Win	3–0	Johnny Morris	TKO	4 (4)	April 1, 1941	18 years, 265 days	Westchester County Center, White Plains, New York, U.S.	
2	Win	2–0	Tony Gillo	PTS	6	Mar 14, 1941	18 years, 247 days	Pyramid Mosque, Bridgeport, Connecticut, U.S.	
1	Win	1–0	Charley Mackley	PTS	4	Mar 3, 1941	18 years, 236 days	St. Nicholas Rink, New York, U.S.	

== Titles in boxing ==
=== Major world titles ===
- NYSAC middleweight champion (160 lbs)
- NBA (WBA) middleweight champion (160 lbs)

=== The Ring magazine titles ===
- The Ring middleweight champion (160 lbs)

=== Undisputed titles ===
- Undisputed middleweight champion

== See also ==
- List of middleweight boxing champions
- Bronx Walk of Fame

Achievements
Preceded by Marcel Cerdan	World Middleweight Champion; June 16, 1949 – February 14, 1951	Succeeded by Sugar Ray Robinson
Sporting positions
Previous: Al Hostak	Oldest Living World Champion; August 13, 2006 – September 19, 2017	Next: Robert Cohen
