= Sterling Oval =

Former arena in the Bronx, New York

- Interactive map of Sterling Oval
- Full name: Sterling Oval
- Address: East 164th Street and Teller Avenue; The Bronx, New York; United States
- Coordinates: 40°49′40″N 73°54′50″W
- Type: Outdoor arena

Construction
- Closed: 1954

Tenants
- Bronx Sterlings; New York Americans (ASL) (1946-1954); Brookhattan (ASL) (1946-1954)

Sterling Oval was an outdoor arena located at East 164th Street and Teller Avenue in the Westchester Square neighborhood of the Bronx, New York City. It was the second home of the New York Americans and Brookhattan of the American Soccer League.

== History ==
Sterling Oval was situated at East 164th Street and Teller Avenue in the Bronx, New York City.

=== Baseball ===
The venue became known as a home for top-level semi-pro baseball. The Bronx Sterlings, a semi-pro baseball team managed by "Pop" Auer, played at Sterling Oval in the 1930s.

=== Boxing ===
In 1945, Sterling Oval was fully renovated for professional boxing at a cost of over $5,000, accommodating 5,000 spectators. George "Tonsils" Kobb promoted, and Billy Brown served as matchmaker at the venue, which was designed to provide upper New York City and Westchester County fight fans with an outdoor summer venue.

Boxing events were first introduced at the Bronx Sterling Oval in July 1945. When Mt. Vernon's Vince La Salva met Freddie Addeo in the main event at Sterling Oval on July 23, 1945, they headlined the first professional boxing card staged in the Bronx in more than three years. Joey LaMotta scored a fourth-round knockout victory over Jimmy Mills on September 4, 1945, at Sterling Oval.

On July 2, 1947, Sterling Oval hosted its final boxing show with a main event between former NBA featherweight champion Phil Terranova and Brooklyn's Bernie Bernard.

=== Soccer ===
During the summer of 1946, the New York Americans and Brookhattan purchased Sterling Oval for $75,000, following the loss of Starlight Park to New York City. The New York soccer clubs were both evicted from Starlight Park at the end of the 1945 season when the city acquired the land for a proposed speedway connecting the George Washington and Whitestone Bridges. Sterling Oval, after being chosen as their new home field, received topsoil, grass seed, and other improvements costing $15,000.

Sterling Oval hosted professional soccer for the first time on September 22, 1946, with an interborough doubleheader featuring the four New York teams in the American Soccer League. The Brookhattan Soccer Club faced the Brooklyn Wanderers, while the New York Americans took on the Brooklyn Hispano in exhibition matches. Many American Soccer League Lewis Cup matches were played at Sterling Oval.

== Closure ==
The Sterling Oval in the Bronx closed in April 1954. Following the closure, the New York Americans and Brookhattan moved to Throggs Neck Stadium for the 1954–55 season.
