= Eugene Hairston =

American deaf black boxer (1929–2014)

Eugene "Silent" Hairston (July 1, 1929 – November 24, 2014) was the first American professional Black Deaf boxer. He was born in Harlem, New York in 1929 and became deaf at 1 year old due to a case of spinal meningitis. Growing up, he went to P.S. 47 until he was 15, when he had to drop out to help support his family. He started boxing as an amateur in 1945, winning 59 out of his 60 matches. In 1947, Hairston became a professional boxer. During his time as a boxer, his most famous fight was against Jake LaMotta, which ended in a draw. He was also the Golden Glove champion in 1947. In 1953, Hairston had to retire due to injuries. After his time as a boxer, Hairston worked for UPS.

Hairston is a source of pride for the Black Deaf community and it is said that he proudly claimed the nickname "Silent Hairston" as a descriptor of himself. Additionally, it is said that Eugene Hairston needed flashing lights to indicate when matches were over, something that fans fondly remember him for.

== Early life ==
There are contradicting sources on whether Hairston was born in 1929 or 1930. However, it is clear that he became deaf during his first year of life and had to drop out of school at 15 years old. Hairston's father hoped he would become an artist, but Hairston was inspired by the success of Joe Louis and wanted to become a boxer. After dropping out of school, Hairston worked odd jobs such as being a pinboy and shining shoes, before he shifted to boxing to be his main source of income.

Hairston struggled to have his interest in boxing be taken seriously due to him being Deaf and mute but eventually found success at the Tremont Athletic Club run by Italian brothers Mike and Joe Miele. Mike Miele eventually became Hairston's manager and Joe Miele became his trainer.

== Boxing career ==
Hairston had a short career as a boxer, lasting less than 10 years (from 1945 to 1953). However, during his short stint as a boxer, he boxed many famous individuals and won a variety of titles.

=== Amateur boxing career ===
After six months of persistently asking and waiting outside the Tremont Athletic Club, Hairston's first boxing match was in 1945. These occurred when the owners of the athletic club decided to give him a chance and have him box some of the other amateurs on site. During these first matches, he managed to outlast four separate opponents. In 1947, Hairston received the Chicago Intercity Golden Gloves (147 lb.) Welterweight Championship and the New York Golden Gloves Championship, 137 lb. Open Division. During Hairston's entire amateur boxing career, he won 59 out of his 60 recorded matches.

=== Professional boxing career ===
In the summer of 1947, Hairston enter the professional ranks, winning his first 16 fights in a row. As he began to gather public attention, he was given the nicknames "Silent Hairston" and "The Deaf Wonder." Additionally, he was in matches that appeared on National TV 13 times. During his time as a professional boxer, he fought individuals such as Jake LaMotta, Kid Gavilán, Johnny Bratton, Paul Pender, and Paddy Young.

Hairston's fight against LaMotta on March 5, 1952 was shown on national TV and sold over 10,000 seats. LaMotta had told his father that if he lost the fight, he would have given up boxing entirely. Additionally, Hairston's fights against LaMotta are mentioned in LaMotta's autobiography, Raging Bull.

Hairston's boxing career was cut short on August 27, 1952, during his fight against Carl "Bobo" Olson. During this fight, Hairston sustained a severe gash above his right eyebrow that caused both nerve damage and damage to his vision. Due to the severity of this injury, his boxing license was suspended by the New York State Athletic Commission. Due to his suspended license in most US states, Hairston only had one more fight as a boxer, where he went to France and fought Charley Humez on November 3, 1952. He then retired from boxing at age 22.

== Legacy ==
Not much is known about Hairston's life after his retirement from boxing, however, his time as a Deaf Black boxer has left influences on both the Deaf Black and boxing communities.

The lights in boxing rings signifying the end of a round are accredited to Hairston's career as a boxer. It was due to his inability to hear the bell that these lights were installed by the New York Boxing Commission. Boxers who were not deaf also benefited from this, as some found it difficult to hear the bell over crowd noise. Since Hairston's time as a professional boxer, flashing lights have become standard equipment in the boxing world. Boxer Joey Archer also attributed his interest in boxing partially to Hairston, saying, "I learned from watching guys like Eugene Hairston in the gym."

Hairston's career and impact as a Deaf boxer has also been recognized by Deaf fight fans. In 1975, he was inducted into the American Athletic Association for the Deaf's Hall of Fame and in 1983, he was a guest of honor at the Annual Banquet of the NTID Student Congress.

== Death ==
Hairston died on November 24, 2014, at the age of 85.
