= Chin (combat sports) =

Martial arts term

In combat sports such as boxing, kickboxing and mixed martial arts, a fighter's chin is the ability to tolerate physical trauma to the head, in the form of concussive or sub-concussive blows, without being knocked unconscious or severely disoriented.

== Overview ==
A fighter is known to have a "strong chin" if they have the ability to absorb blows to the head without being struck unconscious or visually impacted by the blow through a loss of control. These fighters are commonly referred to as having a "granite chin", an "iron chin", or similar. Generally, the jaw portion of the skull, and specifically the point of the chin, is the area most vulnerable to a knock-out blow and therefore having an exceptional tolerance to punishment in this area is a great advantage to a fighter.

Fighters are said to have a "weaker chin" if they exhibit limited ability to absorb punishment to the head before they are severely impacted. Some boxing experts, such as Teddy Atlas, believe it to be a mindset.

The "chin" of a fighter is widely considered genetic, but is generally agreed to be affected by the amount of blows the fighter takes throughout their career. Many athletes formerly known to possess a 'good chin' have been known to develop a reliance on this attribute, and this reliance eventually leads to them taking additional concussive blows, which can damage them long-term. The cumulative damage to the brain affects its ability to recover from trauma, weakening the person's ability to take a punch in the long-run.

Certain factors are speculated to be the size and shape of the skull, strength of the neck as well as overall strength and weight. Other factors could be less visible, such as the brain being more efficient at replenishing the electrolyte balance after trauma, or more cerebrospinal fluid to protect the brain.

Many analysts have observed that the ability of a fighter to absorb blows to the head without loss of consciousness can be affected by the process of weight cutting. Combat sport athletes are known to dehydrate themselves at weigh-ins in order to make their optimal weight class for competition. Weigh-ins for competitors usually take place the day before competition meaning that the athletes may not be fully hydrated by the time of their contest. This can reduce the amount of fluid surrounding the brain, exacerbating the damage caused by blows to the head.

== Notable chins ==
Athletes well regarded by pundits and fans for possessing a strong "chin" are listed below:

=== Boxing ===
- Muhammad Ali
- Vitali Klitschko
- Canelo Álvarez
- Mike Gibbons
- Mike O'Dowd
- Marvelous Marvin Hagler
- Rocky Marciano
- Christy Martin
- Randall "Tex" Cobb
- Chris Eubank
- George Foreman
- Gennady Golovkin
- Joe Baksi
- Jake LaMotta
- Larry Holmes
- Evander Holyfield
- Riddick Bowe
- Bernard Hopkins
- George Chuvalo
- James Toney
- Joshua Clottey
- Azumah Nelson
- David Tua
- Oliver McCall
- Carlos Monzón
- Kid Gavilán
- Carl Froch
- Mikkel Kessler
- Shane Mosley
- Carlos Palomino
- Andy Ruiz Jr.
- Timothy Bradley
- Fabio Wardley
- Ruslan Provodnikov

=== Kickboxing ===
- Remy Bonjasky
- Francois Botha
- Hongman Choi
- Francisco Filho
- Daniel Ghiţă

=== Mixed martial arts ===
- Max Holloway
- Khabib Nurmagomedov
- Marvin Vettori
- Nate Diaz
- Stephan Bonnar
- Shane Carwin
- Carlos Condit
- Nick Diaz
- Junior dos Santos
- Frankie Edgar
- Fedor Emelianenko
- Tony Ferguson
- Don Frye
- Kelvin Gastelum
- Dan Henderson
- Mark Hunt
- Blagoy Ivanov
- Quinton Jackson
- Jon Jones
- BJ Penn
- Yoel Romero
- Diego Sanchez
- Robbie Lawler
- Marlon Vera

== See also ==
- Knockout
