= Joey LaMotta =

American boxer (1925–2020)

Personal information
- Born: Giuseppe LaMotta; April 27, 1925 Bronx, New York, U.S.
- Died: December 29, 2020 (aged 95)
- Weight: Middleweight

Boxing career
- Stance: Orthodox

Boxing record
- Total fights: 39
- Wins: 32
- Win by KO: 22
- Losses: 5
- Draws: 2
- No contests: 0

Giuseppe LaMotta (April 27, 1925 – December 29, 2020), better known as Joey LaMotta, was an American boxer who was the younger brother and one time manager of former world middleweight boxing champion Jake LaMotta.

== Professional career ==
LaMotta also boxed for a short time in 1945 and 1946. His record was 32 wins (22 KOs), 5 losses (1 KO), and 2 draws.

== Raging Bull ==
Joe Pesci was nominated for a Best Supporting Actor Academy Award for his portrayal of Joey in the 1980 film Raging Bull, a biographical film about his brother Jake's turbulent life and career.

== Personal life ==
His son, John LaMotta, was an actor and also an amateur boxer who fought in the heavyweight-novice class of the 2001 Golden Gloves championship tournament.

== Death ==
LaMotta died on December 29, 2020, at age 95.

== Professional boxing record ==
32 Wins (22 knockouts, 10 decisions), 5 Losses (1 knockout, 4 decisions), 2 Draws
Result	Record	Opponent	Type	Round	Date	Location	Notes
Loss	32-5-2	(United States) Freddie Flores	PTS	10	1946-11-05	(United States) Park Arena, Bronx, New York, U.S.	
Loss	32-4-2	(United States) Freddie Flores	TKO	4 (10), 3:00	1946-10-21	(United States) Laurel Garden Arena, Newark, New Jersey, U.S.	
Loss	32-3-2	(Estonia) Anton Raadik	PTS	10	1946-09-12	(United States) Wrigley Field, Chicago, Illinois, U.S.	
Win	32-2-2	(United States) Gene Boland	SD	10	1946-08-07	(United States) University of Detroit Stadium, Detroit, Michigan, U.S.	
Loss	31-2-2	(United States) Joe Blackwood	UD	10	1946-05-10	(United States) Boston Garden, Boston, Massachusetts, U.S.	
Draw	31-1-2	(United States) Joe Blackwood	PTS	10	1946-04-12	(United States) Boston Garden, Boston, Massachusetts, U.S.	
Win	31-1-1	(United States) John Henry Johnson	TKO	4 (8), 1:59	1946-03-29	(United States) Boston Garden, Boston, Massachusetts, U.S.	
Win	30-1-1	(United States) Tony Riccio	PTS	8	1946-03-18	(United States) Laurel Garden Arena, Newark, New Jersey, U.S.	
Win	29-1-1	(United States) Bobby Berger	UD	8	1946-03-12	(United States) Park Arena, Bronx, New York, U.S.	
Win	28-1-1	(United States) Bobby Berger	UD	8	1946-02-05	(United States) Park Arena, Bronx, New York, U.S.	
Win	27-1-1	(United States) Art Brown	UD	10	1945-12-07	(United States) Chicago Stadium, Chicago, Illinois, U.S.	
Win	26-1-1	(United States) Johnny Jones	KO	5 (8)	1945-11-23	(United States) Boston Garden, Boston, Massachusetts, U.S.	
Win	25-1-1	(Cuba) Andres Gomez	KO	2 (8), 2:41	1945-10-23	(United States) Park Arena, Bronx, New York, U.S.	
Win	24-1-1	(United States) Larney Moore	TKO	5 (6), 1:25	1945-10-15	(United States) Stanley Arena, New Britain, Connecticut, U.S.	
Win	23-1-1	(United States) Dan Aldrich	KO	1 (8), 0:56	1945-10-09	(United States) Park Arena, Bronx, New York, U.S.	
Win	22-1-1	(United States) Martin Doyle	TKO	2 (6), 1:35	1945-09-26	(United States) Comiskey Park, Chicago, Illinois, U.S.	
Win	21-1-1	(United States) Ballesandro Carubia	TKO	4 (8)	1945-09-15	(United States) Ridgewood Grove, Brooklyn, New York, U.S.	
Win	20-1-1	(United States) Jimmy Mills	KO	4 (8)	1945-09-04	(United States) Sterling Oval, Bronx, New York, U.S.	
Win	19-1-1	(United States) Lew Perez	KO	2 (10)	1945-08-13	(United States) Mitchell Field, Stamford, Connecticut, U.S.	
Win	18-1-1	(United States) Billy Johnson	PTS	6	1945-08-10	(United States) Madison Square Garden, New York, New York, U.S.	
Win	17-1-1	(United States) Jack Garrity	KO	2 (6)	1945-06-29	(United States) Carney Auditorium, Erie, Pennsylvania, U.S.	
Win	16-1-1	(United States) Charlie Finley	KO	1 (8)	1945-06-25	(United States) Mitchell Field, Stamford, Connecticut, U.S.	
Win	15-1-1	(United States) Jimmy Davis	KO	4 (8), 0:37	1945-06-19	(United States) Westchester County Center, White Plains, New York, U.S.	
Win	14-1-1	(United States) Tom Collins	PTS	6	1945-06-11	(United States) Queensboro Arena, Long Island City, New York, U.S.	
Loss	13-1-1	(United States) Jimmy Mills	PTS	7	1945-05-16	(United States) Paterson, New Jersey, U.S.	
Draw	13-0-1	(United States) Jimmy Mills	PTS	6	1945-05-02	(United States) Armory, Paterson, New Jersey, U.S.	
Win	13-0	(United States) Lee Black	RTD	3 (6)	1945-04-28	(United States) Ridgewood Grove, Brooklyn, New York, U.S.	
Win	12-0	(United States) Dave Carver	KO	2 (6), 1:37	1945-04-27	(United States) Boston Garden, Boston, Massachusetts, U.S.	
Win	11-0	(Canada) Fernand Demers	TKO	1 (6), 2:42	1945-04-20	(United States) St. Nicholas Arena, New York, New York, U.S.	
Win	10-0	(Mexico) Baudelio Valencia	KO	3 (6), 1:45	1945-04-10	(United States) Westchester County Center, White Plains, New York, U.S.	
Win	9-0	(United States) Al Jackson	KO	1 (6), 2:15	1945-03-26	(United States) Chicago Stadium, Chicago, Illinois, U.S.	
Win	8-0	(United States) Jimmy Campbell	KO	1 (6)	1945-03-19	(United States) U.S.O. Auditorium, Norfolk, Virginia, U.S.	
Win	7-0	(United States) Lee Black	KO	2 (6), 1:55	1945-03-13	(United States) Westchester County Center, White Plains, New York, U.S.	
Win	6-0	(Mexico) Baudelio Valencia	PTS	6	1945-03-06	(United States) Jersey City Gardens, Jersey City, New Jersey, U.S.	
Win	5-0	(United States) Ernest Barnwell	PTS	6	1945-02-27	(United States) Westchester County Center, White Plains, New York, U.S.	
Win	4-0	(United States) Jerry McGee	TKO	2 (4)	1945-02-24	(United States) Ridgewood Grove, Brooklyn, New York, U.S.	
Win	3-0	(United States) Buddy Jackson	KO	1 (4), 2:45	1945-02-20	(United States) Jersey City Gardens, Jersey City, New Jersey, U.S.	
Win	2-0	(United States) Lew Perez	PTS	4	1945-02-13	(United States) Westchester County Center, White Plains, New York, U.S.	
Win	1-0	(United States) Charley Howard	TKO	1 (4)	1945-02-06	(United States) Westchester County Center, White Plains, New York, U.S.	
