= Vikki LaMotta =

American model and author

- Vikki with family in 1947
- Born: Beverly Thailer; January 23, 1930; Bronx, New York, U.S.
- Died: January 25, 2005 (aged 75); Boca Raton, Florida, U.S.
- Occupation: Model
- Spouse(s): Jake LaMotta (divorced); Tony Foster (divorced)
- Children: 4

Vikki LaMotta (January 23, 1930 – January 25, 2005), born Beverly Thailer, was an American model and the second wife of champion boxer Jake LaMotta, during his peak years of success, during which time Vikki became a celebrity.

In the 1990s, she wrote an autobiography, but requested it not be released until after her death due to the information revealed in the book. After she died in 2005, Knockout!: The Sexy, Violent, Extraordinary Life of Vikki LaMotta was released in 2006.

Producer Roderick Powell acquired the rights to adapt her autobiography into a biopic on January 6, 2021.

== Biography ==
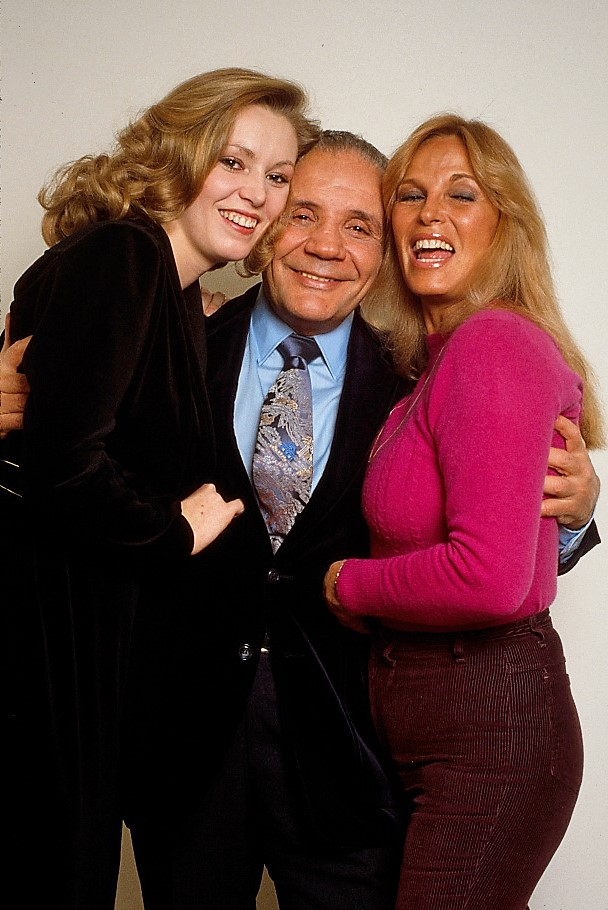
Actress Cathy Moriarty (left), Jake LaMotta, and Vikki LaMotta, whom Moriarty played in the film Raging Bull, 1980s.

She was born in the Bronx, the daughter of Abraham Lucien and Margaret "Ruth" Thailer. She grew up in poverty because of her father’s gambling and frequent losses. She had several siblings, including two sisters, Phyllis and Patricia. Her paternal grandparents were immigrants from Romania. Her father was strict and her mother did not intervene. For example, her father once cut off all of Vikki's hair to deter what he perceived as sexual attention.

When she was 16 she married 24 year old Jake LaMotta, after becoming pregnant with his child. She had met him the previous year at a community pool while he was still married to his first wife. It was Vikki's first marriage. After LaMotta retired from boxing, the family moved to Miami, Florida. They divorced in 1957 after 11 years of marriage, during which he was physically abusive. When Jake's boxing career had started to slow down, his drinking increased and he began taking out his anger on Vikki, becoming more controlling of her. At 27, Vikki left the marriage, taking her three small children with her. They had a daughter Christi and two sons, Jake Jr. and Joseph. Both sons died in 1998 with Jake Jr. dying from liver cancer in February and Joseph in an airplane crash that September.

In 1962, she married Tony Foster; they had a son, Harrison, and later divorced.

She is known for her work as a model. She later posed for a nude pictorial in Playboy magazine in November 1981 at age 51. In her later years, she lent her name to a cosmetics line and appeared in commercials for Vikki LaMotta Cosmetics.

In 1992, she moved to Hillsboro Beach, Florida.

She was portrayed by actress Cathy Moriarty in the 1980 film Raging Bull. Moriarty was nominated for the Academy Award for Best Supporting Actress for her performance as Vikki.

== Death ==
She died six months following open-heart surgery in Boca Raton, Florida on January 25, 2005, two days after her 75th birthday. She is survived by her daughter, Christi LaMotta and son Harrison Foster.
