= Villemain (surname) =

Villemain is a surname. Notable people with the surname include:

- Abel-François Villemain (1790–1870), French politician
- Robert Villemain (1924–1984), French boxer
