= Born Yesterday (play) =

1946 play by Garson Kanin

- Written by: Garson Kanin
- Date premiered: February 4, 1946
- Place premiered: Lyceum Theatre; New York City
- Original language: English
- Genre: Comedy
- Setting: Washington, DC. September 1946.

Born Yesterday is a play written by Garson Kanin which premiered on Broadway in 1946, starring Judy Holliday as Billie Dawn. The play was adapted into a successful 1950 film of the same name.

== Plot ==
An uncouth, corrupt rich junk dealer, Harry Brock, brings his showgirl mistress Billie Dawn with him to Washington, D.C. When Billie's ignorance becomes a liability to Brock's business dealings, he hires a journalist, Paul Verrall, to educate his girlfriend. In the process of learning, Billie Dawn realizes how corrupt Harry is and begins interfering with his plans to bribe a Congressman into passing legislation that would allow Brock's business to make more money.

== Productions ==
=== 1946 original Broadway ===
Born Yesterday opened on February 4, 1946 on Broadway at the Lyceum Theatre and ran there until November 6, 1948; the play transferred to Henry Miller's Theatre on November 9, 1948 and closed on December 31, 1949, after a total of 1,642 performances. As of 2019 it was the seventh longest-running non-musical play in Broadway history. Judy Holliday starred as Billie, with Paul Douglas as Harry Brock and Gary Merrill as Paul Verrall. Written and directed by Garson Kanin, the scenic design was by Donald Oenslager and costume design by Ruth Kanin. Jean Arthur was originally cast in the role of Billie but quit during tryouts.

For his performance as Harry Brock, Paul Douglas was awarded the 1946 Clarence Derwent Award for the most promising male performance.

Original Broadway cast

- Paul Douglas – Harry Brock
- Judy Holliday – Billie Dawn
- Gary Merrill – Paul Verrall
- Carroll Ashburn – The Assistant Manager
- Frank Otto – Eddie Brock
- Larry Oliver – Senator Norval Hedges
- Mona Bruns – Mrs. Hedges
- C. L. Burke – waiter
- Ellen Hall – Helen
- Otto Hulett - Ed Devery

Judy Holliday appeared as Billie Dawn in over 1,200 performances. Her replacements in the role included Jean Hagen and Jan Sterling.

=== 1947 original West End ===
The first British production of the play was directed and presented by Laurence Olivier, designed by Roger Furse, and made a star of Yolande Donlan. It began a regional tour on November 18, 1946, reaching London's Garrick Theatre on January 23, 1947 and playing until November 15, 1947.

Original West End cast

- Hartley Power - Harry Brock
- Yolande Donlan - Billie Dawn
- William Kemp - Paul Verrall
- Launce Maraschal - Senator Norval Hedges
- Bessie Love - Mrs. Hedges
- Michael Balfour - Eddie Brock
- Harry Lane - The Assistant Manager
- Lionel Dunn - waiter
- Mona Harrison - Helen
- Stanley Maxted - Ed Devery

=== Revival by Princeton University's Summer Theater in 1950 ===
A production staged at Princeton University's McCarter Theatre, directed by Herbert Kenwith and starring Shelley Winters as Billie Dawn and Judson Pratt as Harry Brock, debuted June 19, 1950 and was enthusiastically received by Daily Home News critic Jack Lewis, who notes that "Kenwith's direction is in no small way responsible for the success of the show. More notable, however, is his selection of Shelley Winters and Judson Pratt to play the key roles. And their handling of these assignments is what made 'Born Yesterday' a laugh-filled experience for last night's audience." A brief tour of New England venues—necessarily limited by Winters' prior commitment—ensued, to similarly glowing reviews.

=== Revival by the Negro Drama Group in 1953–54 ===
A production mounted by the Negro Drama Group at Broadway's President Theatre, starring Edna Mae Robinson as Billie Dawn, Powell Lindsay as Harry Brock and Henry Scott as Paul Verrall, was given a full review in The New York Times on January 1, 1954, with the theatre critic (signature L. C.) mentioning that "...Mrs. Robinson is in private life the wife of Sugar Ray Robinson, the former welterweight and middleweight champion of the world" and that she "...is possessed of a natural flair for comedy. With some judicious direction she could go a long way toward achieving spectacular success in the theatre." Although the production received positive reviews, it closed after five days.

=== Watergate era ===
According to theatre scholar Jordan Schildcrout, the Watergate scandal brought renewed interest in Born Yesterday, with a surge of productions in the early 1970s starring Betty Grable, Sandy Dennis, Chita Rivera, and Karen Valentine at major regional theatres, as well as Lynn Redgrave in a London revival directed by Tom Stoppard. The critic Michael Billington noted, "With the Watergate scandal coming to a head, the play suddenly seems as fresh and relevant as the day it was written." Kanin himself later asserted, "When the play was written it was a fable, but after Watergate it became a documentary."

=== 1989 Broadway revival ===
The play was revived on Broadway in 1989. It opened at the 46th Street Theatre in previews on January 18, 1989, officially on January 29, 1989, and closed on June 11, 1989 after 153 performances. It was directed by Josephine R. Abady and starred Edward Asner and Madeline Kahn, who received a Tony Award nomination for Best Actress in a Play.

1989 revival cast

Source:New York Times

- Edward Asner – Harry Brock
- Madeline Kahn – Billie Dawn
- Franklin Cover – Ed Devery
- Daniel Hugh Kelly – Paul Verrall
- Joel Bernstein – Eddie Brock
- Charlotte Booker – Manicurist
- Peggy Cosgrave – Mrs. Hedges
- Heather Ehlers – Helen, a maid
- Paul Hebron – Another Bellhop, Barber, Waiter
- Gregory Jbara – Bellhop, Bootblack
- Ron Johnston – The Assistant Manager
- John Wylie – Senator Norval Hedges

=== 2011 Broadway revival ===
The second Broadway revival opened at the Cort Theatre for previews 31 March 2011, performances began on April 24, 2011. The show closed on 26 June 2011 after 28 previews and 73 performances. Directed by Doug Hughes, the play starred Jim Belushi as Harry Brock, Nina Arianda as Billie Dawn and Robert Sean Leonard as Paul Verrall.

The 2011 revival was nominated for the Tony Award for Best Performance by an Actress in a Leading Role in a Play and Best Costume Design of a Play (Catherine Zuber).

2011 revival cast

- Jim Belushi as Harry Brock
- Nina Arianda as Billie Dawn
- Frank Wood as Ed Devery
- Robert Sean Leonard as Paul Verrall
- Michael McGrath as Eddie Brock
- Liv Rooth as A Manicurist
- Patricia Hodges as Mrs. Hedges
- Jennifer Regan as Helen, a maid
- Fred Arsenault as Bellhop #1
- Danny Rutigliano as Bellhop #2/Bootblack
- Bill Christ as A Bellhop #3/Barber
- Andrew Weems as The Assistant Manager
- Terry Beaver as Senator Norval Hedges

== Film adaptations ==
The 1950 film adaptation, made by Columbia Pictures with direction by George Cukor starred Judy Holliday and William Holden. A 1993 remake directed by Luis Mandoki and released through Buena Vista Pictures, starred Melanie Griffith as Billie Dawn and updated the plot.
