= Sugar Ray Robinson =

American boxer (1921–1989)

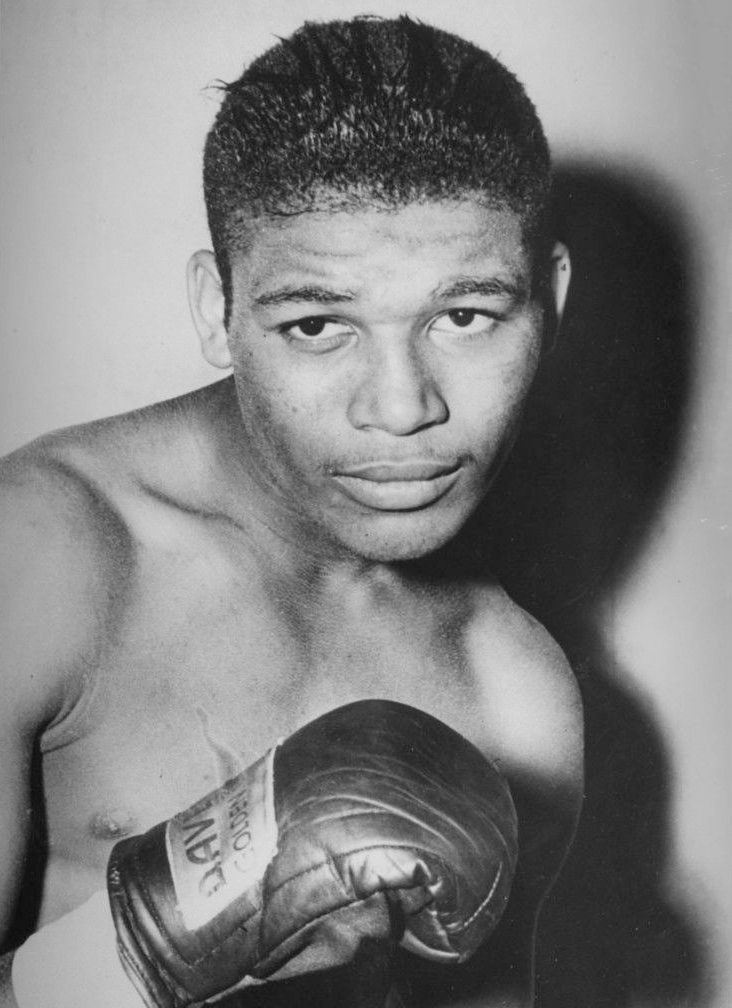
- Robinson in 1947

Personal information
- Born: Walker Smith Jr. May 3, 1921 Ailey, Georgia, U.S.
- Died: April 12, 1989 (aged 67) Los Angeles, California, U.S.
- Height: 5 ft 11 in (180 cm)
- Weight: Lightweight; Welterweight; Middleweight; Light heavyweight

Boxing career
- Reach: 72 1/2 in (184 cm)
- Stance: Orthodox

Boxing record
- Total fights: 201
- Wins: 174
- Win by KO: 109
- Losses: 19
- Draws: 6
- No contests: 2
Medal record
Men's amateur boxing
New York Golden Gloves
Gold medal – first place	1939 New York	Featherweight
Gold medal – first place	1940 New York	Lightweight
Intercity Golden Gloves
Gold medal – first place	1939 Chicago	Featherweight
Gold medal – first place	1940 New York	Lightweight

Sugar Ray Robinson (born Walker Smith Jr.; May 3, 1921 – April 12, 1989) was an American professional boxer who competed from 1940 to 1965. He was inducted into the International Boxing Hall of Fame as a member of its inaugural class in 1990. He is often regarded as the greatest boxer of all time, pound-for-pound, and is ranked as such by BoxRec as of May 2026.

Robinson was a dominant amateur, but his exact amateur record is not known. It is usually listed as 85–0 with 69 knockouts, 40 in the first round. However it has been reported he lost to Billy Graham and Patsy Pesca as a teenager under his given name, Walker Smith Jr. He turned professional in 1940 at the age of 19 and by 1951 had a professional record of 129–1–2 with 85 knockouts. From 1943 to 1951 Robinson went on a 91-fight unbeaten streak, the sixth-longest in professional boxing history. Robinson held the world welterweight title from 1946 to 1951, and won the world middleweight title in the latter year. He retired in 1952, only to come back two-and-a-half years later and regain the middleweight title in 1955.

He then became the first boxer in history to win a divisional world championship five times (a feat he accomplished by defeating Carmen Basilio in 1958 to regain the middleweight championship). Robinson was named "fighter of the year" twice: first for his performances in 1942, then nine years and over 90 fights later, for his efforts in 1951. Historian Bert Sugar ranked Robinson as the greatest fighter of all time and in 2002, Robinson was also ranked number one on The Ring magazine's list of "80 Best Fighters of the Last 80 Years". He was named the best boxer of all time, pound for pound, by the International Boxing Research Organization (IBRO) in both of its all-time ratings, in 2006 and 2019.

Renowned for his classy and flamboyant lifestyle outside the ring, Robinson is credited with being the originator of the modern sports "entourage". After his boxing career ended, Robinson attempted a career as an entertainer, but it was not successful. He struggled financially from the end of his boxing career in 1965 until his death in 1989. In 2006, he was featured on a commemorative stamp by the United States Postal Service.

== Early life ==
Robinson was born Walker Smith Jr. in Ailey, Georgia, to Walker Smith Sr. and Leila Hurst. Robinson was the youngest of three children; his eldest sister Marie was born in 1917, and his other sister Evelyn in 1919. His father was a cotton, peanut, and corn farmer in Georgia, who moved the family to Detroit where he initially found work in construction. According to Robinson, Smith Sr. later worked two jobs to support his family—cement mixer and sewer worker. "He had to get up at six in the morning and he'd get home close to midnight. Six days a week. The only day I really saw him was Sunday ... I always wanted to be with him more."

His parents separated, and he moved with his mother to Harlem at the age of 12. Robinson originally aspired to be a doctor, but after dropping out of DeWitt Clinton High School (in the Bronx) in ninth grade, he switched his goal to boxing.

When he was 14, he attempted to enter his first boxing tournament, but was told he first needed an AAU membership card—which he could not legally procure until he was 16. He circumvented the AAU's age requirement by using an ID card from a youth named Ray Robinson, who had quit boxing. So, Walker began his amateur fighting career under that name—and it stuck. Later, when a lady in the audience at a fight in Watertown, New York, said he was "sweet as sugar," the name "Sugar Ray Robinson" was born.

Robinson idolized Henry Armstrong and Joe Louis as a youth, and actually had lived on the same block as Louis in Detroit when Robinson was 11 and Louis was 17. Outside the ring, Robinson got into trouble frequently as a youth, and was involved with a street gang. He married at 16. The couple had one son, Ronnie, and divorced when Robinson was 19.

He reportedly finished his amateur career with an 85–0 record with 69 knockouts – 40 coming in the first round, though this has been disputed. He won the New York Golden Gloves featherweight championship in 1939 (defeating Louis Valentine on points in 3 rounds), and the New York Golden Gloves lightweight championship in 1940 (defeating Andy Nonella by KO in 2).

== Boxing career ==
=== Early career ===
Robinson made his professional debut on October 4, 1940, winning by a second-round stoppage over Joe Echevarria. Robinson fought five more times in 1940, winning all, four by knockout. In 1941, he defeated world champion Sammy Angott, future champion Marty Servo, and former champion Fritzie Zivic. The Robinson-Angott fight was held above the lightweight limit, since Angott did not want to risk losing his lightweight title. The Zivic bout, held at the Madison Square Garden, drew a crowd of 20,551—one of the largest in the arena to that date. Robinson won the first five rounds, according to Joseph C. Nichols of The New York Times, before Zivic came back to land several punches to Robinson's head in the sixth and seventh. Robinson controlled the next two, and had Zivic hurt in the ninth. After a close tenth round, Robinson was announced as the winner on all three scorecards.

Robinson knocked out Zivic in the tenth round in a January 1942 rematch, only the second time Zivic had been counted out in more than 150 fights. Robinson knocked him down in the ninth and tenth rounds before the referee stopped the fight. Zivic and his corner protested the stoppage; James P. Dawson of The New York Times stated "[t]hey were criticizing a humane act. The battle had been a slaughter, for want of a more delicate word." Robinson then won four consecutive bouts by knockout, before defeating Servo in a controversial split decision in their May rematch. After winning three more fights, Robinson faced Jake LaMotta, who would become one of his more prominent rivals, for the first time in October. He defeated LaMotta by a unanimous decision, although he failed to get Jake down. Robinson weighed 145 lb (66 kg) compared to 157.5 for LaMotta, but he was able to control the fight from the outside for the entire bout, and actually landed the harder punches during the fight. Robinson then won four more fights, including two against Izzy Jannazzo, from October 19 to December 14. For his performances, Robinson was named "Fighter of the Year". He finished 1942 with a total of 14 wins and no losses.

Robinson built a record of 40–0 before losing for the first time to LaMotta in a 10-round re-match. LaMotta, who had a 16 lb (7.3 kg) weight advantage over Robinson, knocked Robinson out of the ring in the eighth round, and won the fight by decision. The fight took place in Robinson's former home town of Detroit, and attracted a record crowd. After being controlled by Robinson in the early rounds LaMotta came back to take control in the later. After winning the third LaMotta fight less than three weeks later, Robinson then defeated his childhood idol: former champion Henry Armstrong, whom he only fought because the older man was in need of money. Robinson later stated that he carried the aged former champion.

On February 27, 1943, Robinson was inducted into the United States Army, where he was again referred to as Walker Smith. Robinson had a 15-month military career. Robinson served with Joe Louis, and the pair went on tours with the Special Services division where they performed exhibition bouts in front of U.S. Army troops. Robinson got into trouble several times while in the military. He argued with superiors who he felt were discriminatory against him, and refused to fight exhibitions when he was told African American soldiers were not allowed to watch them. In late March 1944 Robinson was stationed at Fort Hamilton in Brooklyn, waiting to ship out to Europe, where he was scheduled to perform more exhibition matches. But on March 29, Robinson disappeared from his barracks. When he woke up on April 5 in Fort Jay Hospital on Governor's Island, he had missed his sailing for Europe and was under suspicion of deserting. He himself reported falling down the stairs in his barracks on the 29th, but said that he had complete amnesia, and he could not remember any events from that moment until the 5th. According to his file, a stranger had found him in the street on April 1 and helped him to a hospital. In his examination report, a doctor at Fort Jay concluded that Robinson's version of events was sincere. He was examined by military authorities, who claimed he suffered from a mental deficiency. Robinson was granted an honorable discharge on June 3, 1944. He later wrote that unfair press coverage of the incident had "branded" him as a "deserter". Robinson maintained his close friendship with Louis from their time in military service, and the two went into business together after the war. They planned to start a liquor distribution business in New York City, but were denied a license due to their race.

Besides the loss in the LaMotta rematch, the only other mark on Robinson's record during this period was a 10-round draw against José Basora in 1945.

=== Welterweight champion ===
By 1946, Robinson had fought 75 fights to a 73–1–1 record, and beaten every top contender in the welterweight division. However, he refused to cooperate with the Mafia, which controlled much of boxing at the time, and was denied a chance to fight for the welterweight championship. Robinson was finally given a chance to win a title against Tommy Bell on December 20, 1946. Robinson had already beaten Bell once by decision in 1945. The two fought for the title vacated by Servo, who had himself lost twice to Robinson in non-title bouts. In the fight, Robinson, who only a month before had been involved in a 10-round brawl with Artie Levine, was knocked down by Bell. The fight was called a "war", but Robinson was able to pull out a close 15-round decision, winning the vacant World Welterweight title.

In 1948 Robinson fought five times, but only one bout was a title defense. Among the fighters he defeated in those non-title bouts was future world champion Kid Gavilán in a close, controversial 10-round fight. Gavilán hurt Robinson several times in the fight, but Robinson controlled the final rounds with a series of jabs and left hooks. In 1949, he boxed 16 times, but again only defended his title once. In that title fight, a rematch with Gavilán, Robinson again won by decision. The first half of the bout was very close, but Robinson took control in the second half. Gavilán would have to wait two more years to begin his own historic reign as welterweight champion. The only boxer to match Robinson that year was Henry Brimm, who fought him to a 10-round draw in Buffalo.

Robinson fought 19 times in 1950. He successfully defended his welterweight title for the last time against Charley Fusari. Robinson won a lopsided 15-round decision, knocking Fusari down once. Robinson donated all but $1 of his purse for the Fusari fight to cancer research. In 1950 Robinson fought George Costner, who had also taken to calling himself "Sugar" and stated in the weeks leading up to the fight that he was the rightful possessor of the name. "We better touch gloves, because this is the only round", Robinson said as the fighters were introduced at the center of the ring. "Your name ain't Sugar, mine is." Robinson then knocked Costner out in 2 minutes and 49 seconds.

==== Jimmy Doyle incident ====
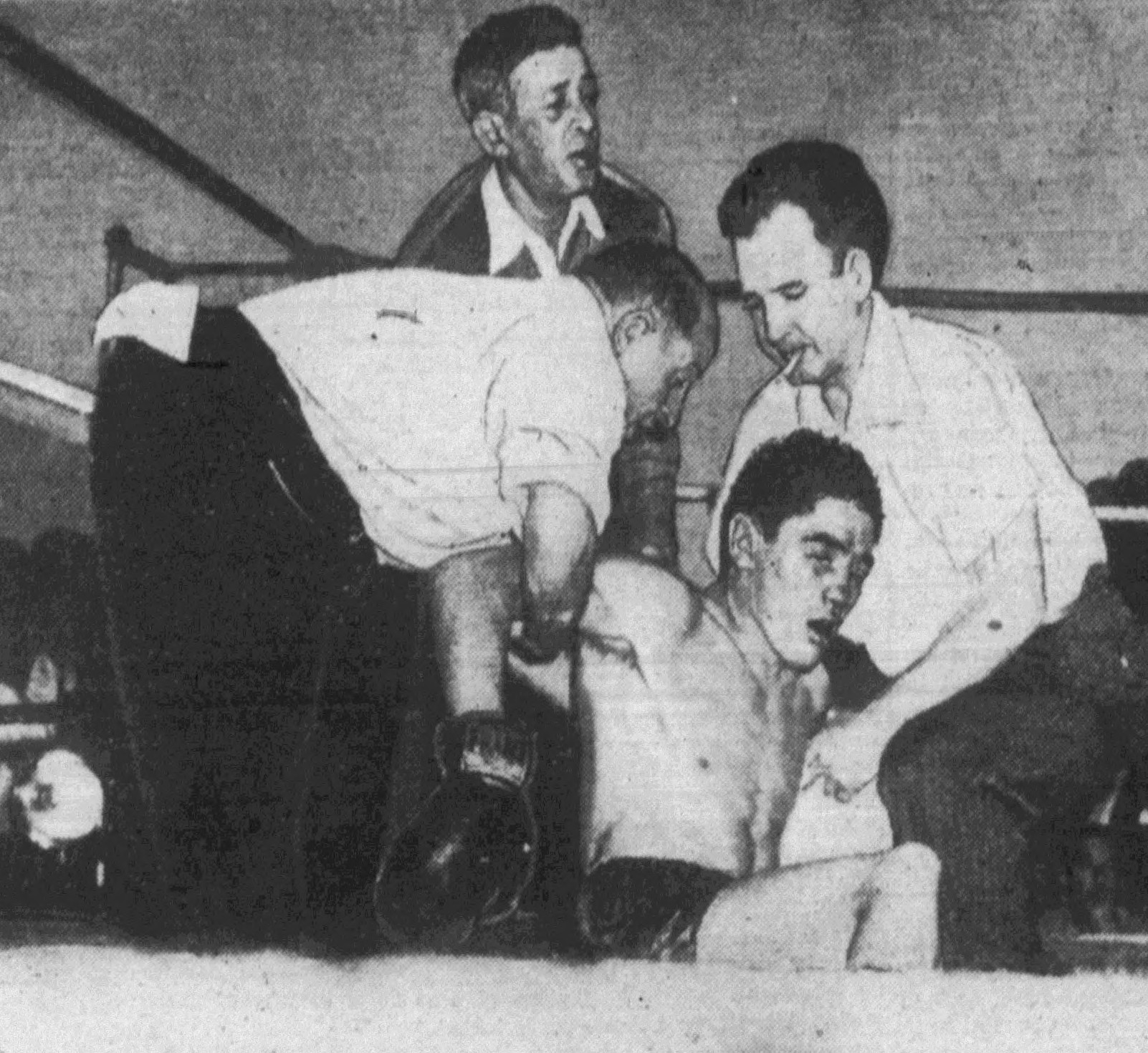
Jimmy Doyle (bottom) being helped up from the canvas by three unidentified men following his match against Sugar Ray Robinson. Doyle died hours later in a Cleveland hospital.

In June 1947, after four non-title bouts, Robinson was scheduled to defend his title for the first time in a bout against Jimmy Doyle. Robinson initially backed out of the fight because he had a dream that he was going to kill Doyle. A priest and a minister convinced him to fight. His dream ended up becoming a reality. On June 25, 1947, Robinson dominated Doyle and scored a decisive knockout in the eighth round that knocked Doyle unconscious and resulted in Doyle's death later that night. Robinson said that the impact of Doyle's death was "very trying".

After Doyle's death, criminal charges were threatened against Robinson in Cleveland, up to and including murder, though none actually materialized. After learning of Doyle's intentions of using the bout's money to buy his mother a house, Robinson gave Doyle's mother the money from his next four bouts so she could purchase herself a home, fulfilling her son's intention.

=== Middleweight champion ===
It is stated in his autobiography that one of the main considerations for his move up to middleweight was the increasing difficulty he was having in making the 147 lb (67 kg) welterweight weight limit. However, the move up would also prove beneficial financially, as the division then contained some of the biggest names in boxing. Vying for the Pennsylvania state middleweight title in 1950, Robinson defeated Robert Villemain. Later that year, in defense of that crown, he defeated Jose Basora, with whom he had previously drawn. Robinson's 50-second, first-round knockout of Basora set a record that would stand for 38 years. In October 1950, Robinson knocked out Bobo Olson a future middleweight title holder.

On February 14, 1951, Robinson and LaMotta met for the sixth time. The fight would become known as The St. Valentine's Day Massacre. Robinson won the undisputed World Middleweight title with a 13th round technical knockout. Robinson outboxed LaMotta for the first 10 rounds, then unleashed a series of savage combinations on LaMotta for three rounds, finally stopping the champion for the first time in their legendary six-bout series—and dealing LaMotta his first legitimate knockout loss in 95 professional bouts. LaMotta had lost by knockout to Billy Fox earlier in his career. However, that fight was later ruled to have been fixed and LaMotta was sanctioned for letting Fox win. That bout, and some of the other bouts in the six-fight Robinson-LaMotta rivalry, was depicted in the Martin Scorsese film Raging Bull. "I fought Sugar Ray so often, I almost got diabetes", LaMotta later said. Robinson won five of his six bouts with LaMotta.

After winning his second world title, he embarked on a European tour which took him all over the Continent. Robinson traveled with his flamingo-pink Cadillac, which caused quite a stir in Paris, and an entourage of 13 people, some included "just for laughs". He was a hero in France due to his recent defeat of LaMotta—the French hated LaMotta for defeating Marcel Cerdan in 1949 and taking his championship belt (Cerdan died in a plane crash en route to a rematch with LaMotta). Robinson met President of France Vincent Auriol at a ceremony attended by France's social upper crust. During his fight in Berlin against Gerhard Hecht, Robinson was disqualified when he knocked his opponent out with a punch to the kidney: a punch legal in the US, but not Europe. The fight was later declared a no-contest. In London, Robinson lost the world middleweight title to British boxer Randolph Turpin in a sensational bout. Three months later in a rematch in front of 60,000 fans at the Polo Grounds, he knocked Turpin out in ten rounds to recover the title. In that bout Robinson was leading on the cards but was cut by Turpin. With the fight in jeopardy, Robinson let loose on Turpin, knocking him down, then getting him to the ropes and unleashing a series of punches that caused the referee to stop the bout. Following Robinson's victory, residents of Harlem danced in the streets. In 1951, Robinson was named Ring Magazine's "Fighter of the Year" for the second time.

In 1952 he fought a rematch with Olson, winning by a decision. He next defeated former champion Rocky Graziano by a third-round knockout, then challenged World Light heavyweight champion Joey Maxim. In the Yankee Stadium bout with Maxim, Robinson built a lead on all three judges' scorecards, but the 103 °F (39 °C) temperature in the ring took its toll. The referee, Ruby Goldstein, was the first victim of the heat, and had to be replaced by referee Ray Miller. The fast-moving Robinson was the heat's next victim – at the end of round 13, he collapsed and failed to answer the bell for the next round, suffering the only knockout of his career.

On June 25, 1952, after the Maxim bout, Robinson gave up his title and retired with a record of 131–3–1–1. He began a career in show business, singing and tap dancing. After about three years, the decline of his businesses and the lack of success in his performing career made him decide to return to boxing. He resumed training in 1954.

=== Comeback ===
In 1955 Robinson returned to the ring. Although he had been inactive for two and a half years, his work as a dancer kept him in peak physical condition: in his autobiography, Robinson states that in the weeks leading up to his debut for a dancing engagement in France, he ran five miles every morning, and then danced for five hours each night. Robinson even stated that the training he did in his attempts to establish a career as a dancer were harder than any he undertook during his boxing career. He won five fights in 1955, before losing a decision to Ralph 'Tiger' Jones. He bounced back, however, and defeated Rocky Castellani by a split decision, then challenged Bobo Olson for the world middleweight title. He won the middleweight championship for the third time with a second-round knockout—his third victory over Olson. After his comeback performance in 1955, Robinson expected to be named fighter of the year. However, the title went to welterweight Carmen Basilio. Basilio's handlers had lobbied heavily for it on the basis that he had never won the award, and Robinson later described this as the biggest disappointment of his professional career. "I haven't forgotten it to this day, and I never will", Robinson wrote in his autobiography. Robinson and Olson fought for the last time in 1956, and Robinson closed the four-fight series with a fourth-round knockout.

In 1957 Robinson lost his title to Gene Fullmer. Fullmer used his aggressive, forward moving style to control Robinson, and knocked him down in the fight. Robinson, however, noticed that Fullmer was vulnerable to the left hook. Fullmer headed into their May rematch as a 3–1 favorite. In the first two rounds Robinson followed Fullmer around the ring, however in the third round he changed tactics and made Fullmer come to him. At the start of the fourth round Robinson came out on the attack and stunned Fullmer, and when Fullmer returned with his own punches, Robinson traded with him, as opposed to clinching as he had done in their earlier fight. The fight was fairly even after four rounds. But in the fifth, Robinson was able to win the title back for a fourth time by knocking out Fullmer with a lightning fast, powerful left hook. Boxing critics have referred to the left-hook which knocked out Fullmer as "the perfect punch". It marked the first time in 44 career fights that Fullmer had been knocked out, and when someone asked Robinson after the fight how far the left hook had traveled, Robinson replied: "I can't say. But he got the message."

Later that year, he lost his title to Basilio in a rugged 15 round fight in front of 38,000 at Yankee Stadium, but regained it for a record fifth time when he beat Basilio in the rematch. Robinson struggled to make weight, and had to go without food for nearly 20 hours leading up to the bout. He badly damaged Basilio's eye early in the fight, and by the seventh round it was swollen shut. The two judges gave the fight to Robinson by wide margins: 72–64 and 71–64. The referee scored the fight for Basilio 69–64, and was booed loudly by the crowd of 19,000 when his decision was announced. The first fight won the "Fight of the Year" award from The Ring magazine for 1957 and the second fight won the "Fight of the Year" award for 1958.

=== Decline ===
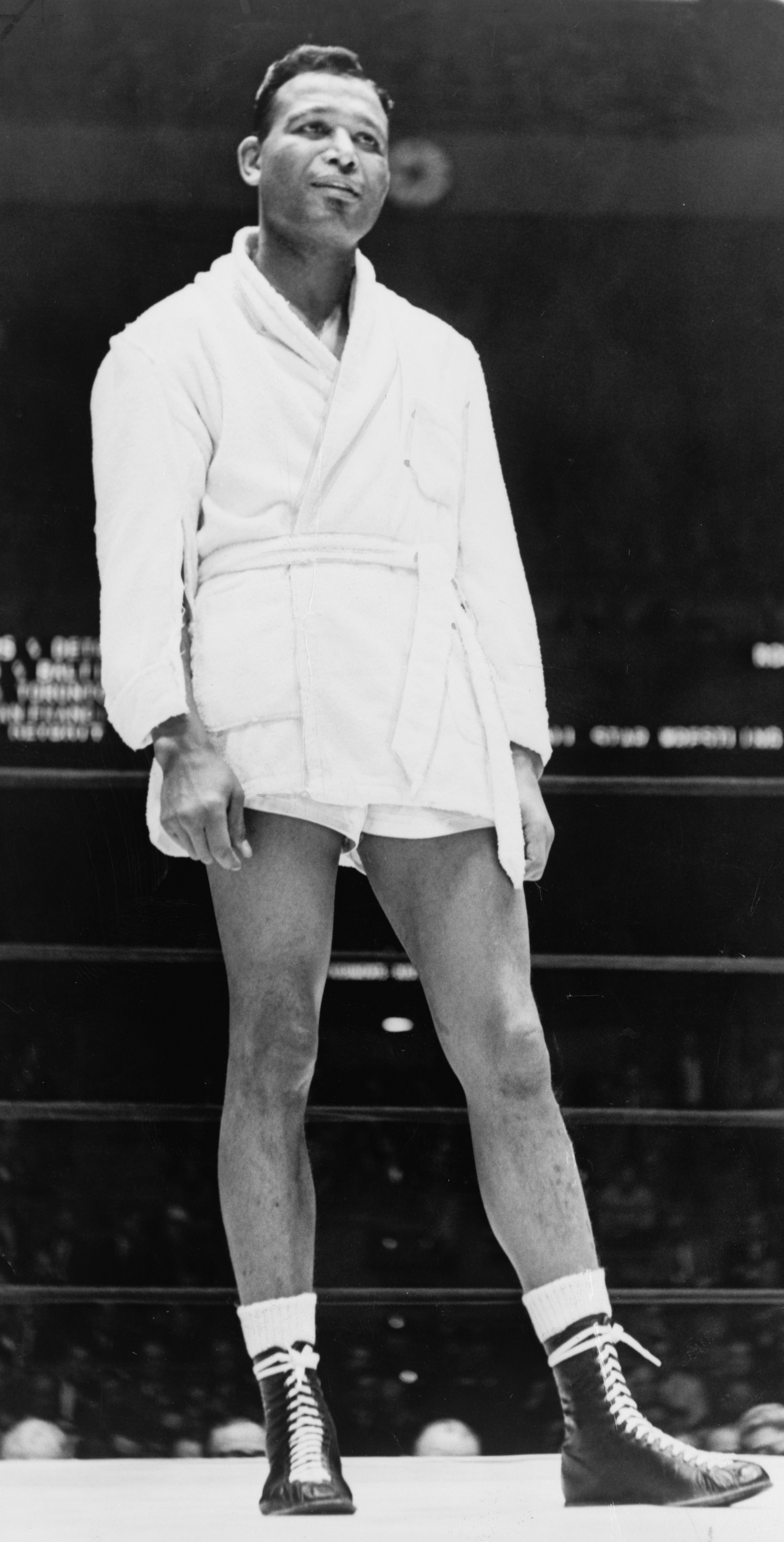
Robinson, Madison Square Garden, 1966

Robinson knocked out Bob Young in the second round in Boston in his only fight in 1959. A year later, he defended his title against Paul Pender. Robinson entered the fight as a 5–1 favorite, but lost a split decision in front of 10,608 at Boston Garden. The day before the fight Pender commented that he planned to start slowly, before coming on late. He did just that and outlasted the aging Robinson, who, despite opening a cut over Pender's eye in the eighth round, was largely ineffective in the later rounds. An attempt to regain the crown for an unheard of sixth time proved beyond Robinson. Despite Robinson's efforts, Pender won by decision in that rematch. On December 3 of that year, Robinson and Fullmer fought a 15-round draw for the WBA middleweight title, which Fullmer retained. In 1961, Robinson and Fullmer fought for a fourth time, with Fullmer retaining the WBA middleweight title by a unanimous decision. The fight would be Robinson's last title bout.

Robinson spent the rest of the 1960s fighting 10-round contests. In October 1961 Robinson defeated future world champion Denny Moyer by a unanimous decision. A 12–5 favorite, the 41-year-old Robinson defeated the 22-year-old Moyer by staying on the outside, rather than engaging him. In their rematch four months later, Moyer defeated Robinson on points, as he pressed the action and made Robinson back up throughout the fight. Moyer won 7–3 on all three judges scorecards. Robinson lost twice more in 1962, before winning six consecutive fights against mostly lesser opposition. In February 1963 Robinson lost by a unanimous decision to former world champion and fellow Hall of Famer Joey Giardello. Giardello knocked Robinson down in the fourth round, and the 43-year-old took until the count of nine to rise to his feet. Robinson was also nearly knocked down in the sixth round, but was saved by the bell. He rallied in the seventh and eight rounds, before struggling in the final two. He then embarked on an 18-month boxing tour of Europe.

Robinson's second no-contest bout came in September 1965 in Norfolk, Virginia in a match with an opponent who turned out to be an impostor. Boxer Neil Morrison, at the time a fugitive and accused robber, signed up for the fight as Bill Henderson, a capable club fighter. The fight was a fiasco, with Morrison being knocked down twice in the first round and once in the second before the disgusted referee, who said "Henderson put up no fight", walked out of the ring. Robinson was initially given a TKO in 1:20 of the second round after the "obviously frightened" Morrison laid himself down on the canvas. Robinson fought for the final time in November 1965. He lost by a unanimous decision to Joey Archer. Famed sports author Pete Hamill mentioned that one of the saddest experiences of his life was watching Robinson lose to Archer. He was even knocked down and Hamill pointed out that Archer had no knockout punch at all; Archer admitted afterward that it was only the second time he had knocked an opponent down in his career. The crowd of 9,023 at the Civic Arena in Pittsburgh gave Robinson several standing ovations, even while he was being thoroughly outperformed by Archer.

On November 11, 1965, Robinson announced his retirement from boxing, saying: "I hate to go too long campaigning for another chance." Robinson retired from boxing with a record of 174–19–6 (2 no contests) with 109 knockouts in 201 professional bouts, ranking him among the all-time leaders in knockouts.

== Later life ==
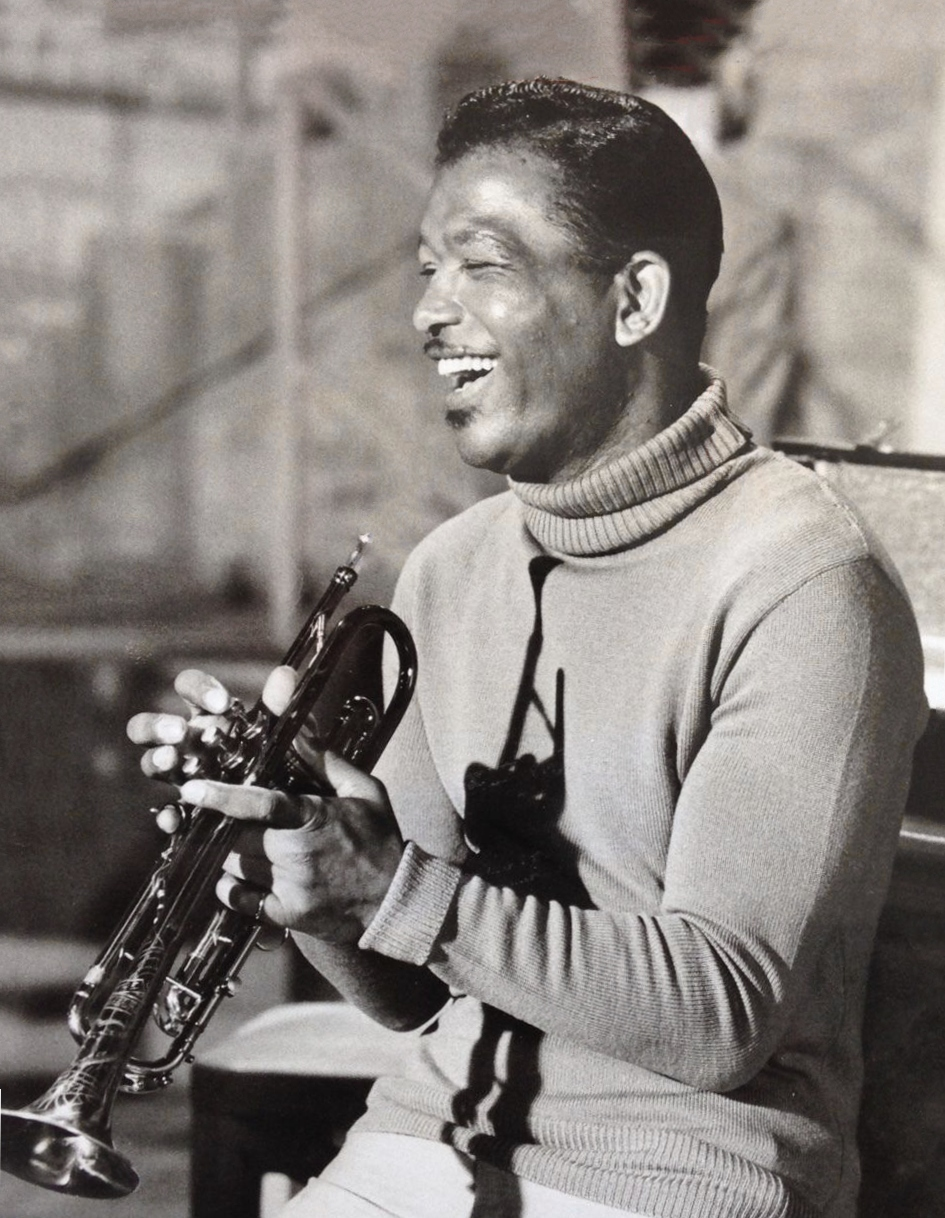
Robinson on Land of the Giants in 1969

In his autobiography, Robinson states that by 1965 he was broke, having spent all of the $4 million in earnings he made inside and out of the ring during his career. A month after his last fight, Robinson was honored with a Sugar Ray Robinson Night on December 10, 1965, in New York's Madison Square Garden. During the ceremony, he was honored with a massive trophy. However, there was not a piece of furniture in his small Manhattan apartment with legs strong enough to support it. Robinson was elected to the Ring Magazine boxing Hall of Fame in 1967, two years after he retired and the International Boxing Hall of Fame in 1990. In the late 1960s he acted in some television shows, like Mission: Impossible. An episode of Land of the Giants called "Giants and All That Jazz" had Sugar as a washed up boxer opening a nightclub. He also appeared in a few films including the Frank Sinatra cop movie The Detective (1968), the cult classic Candy (1968), and the thriller The Todd Killings (1971) as a police officer. In 1969, he founded the Sugar Ray Robinson Youth Foundation for the inner-city Los Angeles area. The foundation does not sponsor a boxing program.

== Death ==
In Robinson's last years he was diagnosed with Alzheimer's disease and diabetes mellitus that was treated with insulin. He died in Los Angeles from heart disease on April 12, 1989, at the age of 67. Robinson is buried at Inglewood Park Cemetery, Inglewood, California.

== Personal life ==
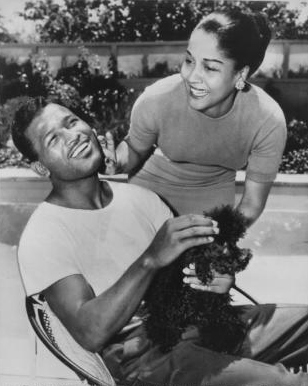
Sugar Ray Robinson with wife Edna Mae in 1956

Robinson married Marjorie Joseph in 1938; the marriage was annulled the same year. Their son, Ronnie Smith, was born on September 25, 1938. Robinson met his second wife Edna Mae Holly, a noted dancer who performed at the Cotton Club and toured Europe with Duke Ellington and Cab Calloway. According to Robinson, he met her at a local pool he frequented after his boxing workouts. In an attempt to get her attention he pushed her into the pool one day, and said it was an accident. After this attempt was met with disdain, he appeared at the nightclub she danced at and introduced himself. Soon the couple were dating and they married in 1944. They had one son, Ray Robinson Jr. (born 1949) before their acrimonious divorce in 1962.

In April 1959, Robinson's eldest sister, Marie, died of cancer at the age of 41.

In December 1959, Barbara Johnson (aka Barbara Trevigne) of South Ozone Park, a singer and dancer, brought a paternity suit in New York against the former champ, claiming Sugar Ray Robinson was the father of her son Paul born in 1953. On May 18, 1963, Jet reported that the court had ruled in Robinson's favor. Robinson is quoted exulting at the win saying "Justice triumphed."

In 1965, Robinson married Millie Wiggins Bruce and the couple settled in Los Angeles. When Robinson was sick with his various ailments, his son accused the elder Robinson's wife of keeping him under the influence of medication to manipulate him. According to Ray Robinson Jr., when Robinson Sr.'s mother died, he could not attend his mother's funeral because Millie was drugging and controlling him. However, Robinson had been hospitalized the day before his mother's death due to agitation which caused his blood pressure to rise. Robinson Jr., and Edna Mae likewise said that Millie kept them away from Robinson during his last years.

Robinson was a Freemason, a membership shared with a number of other athletes, including fellow boxer Jack Dempsey.

== Boxing style ==
Rhythm is everything in boxing. Every move you make starts with your heart, and that's in rhythm or you're in trouble.

— Ray Robinson

Robinson was the modern definition of a boxer puncher. He was able to fight almost any style: he could come out one round brawling, the next counterpunching, and the next fighting on the outside flicking his jab. Robinson would use his formless style to exploit his opponents' weaknesses. He also possessed great speed and precision. He fought in a very conventional way with a firm jab, but threw hooks and uppercuts in flurries in an unconventional way.

He possessed tremendous versatility—according to boxing analyst Bert Sugar, "Robinson could deliver a knockout blow going backward." Robinson was efficient with both hands, and he displayed a variety of effective punches—according to a Time article in 1951, "Robinson's repertoire, thrown with equal speed and power by either hand, includes every standard punch from a bolo to a hook—and a few he makes up on the spur of the moment."

Robinson is considered one of the greatest defensive boxers of all time. His defense relied on footwork, lateral movement and head movement to evade punches. Robinson used the shoulder roll, bob and weave, and slipped punches. Robinson commented that once fighters have trained to a certain level, their techniques and responses become almost reflexive. "You don't think. It's all instinct. If you stop to think, you're gone."

== Legacy ==
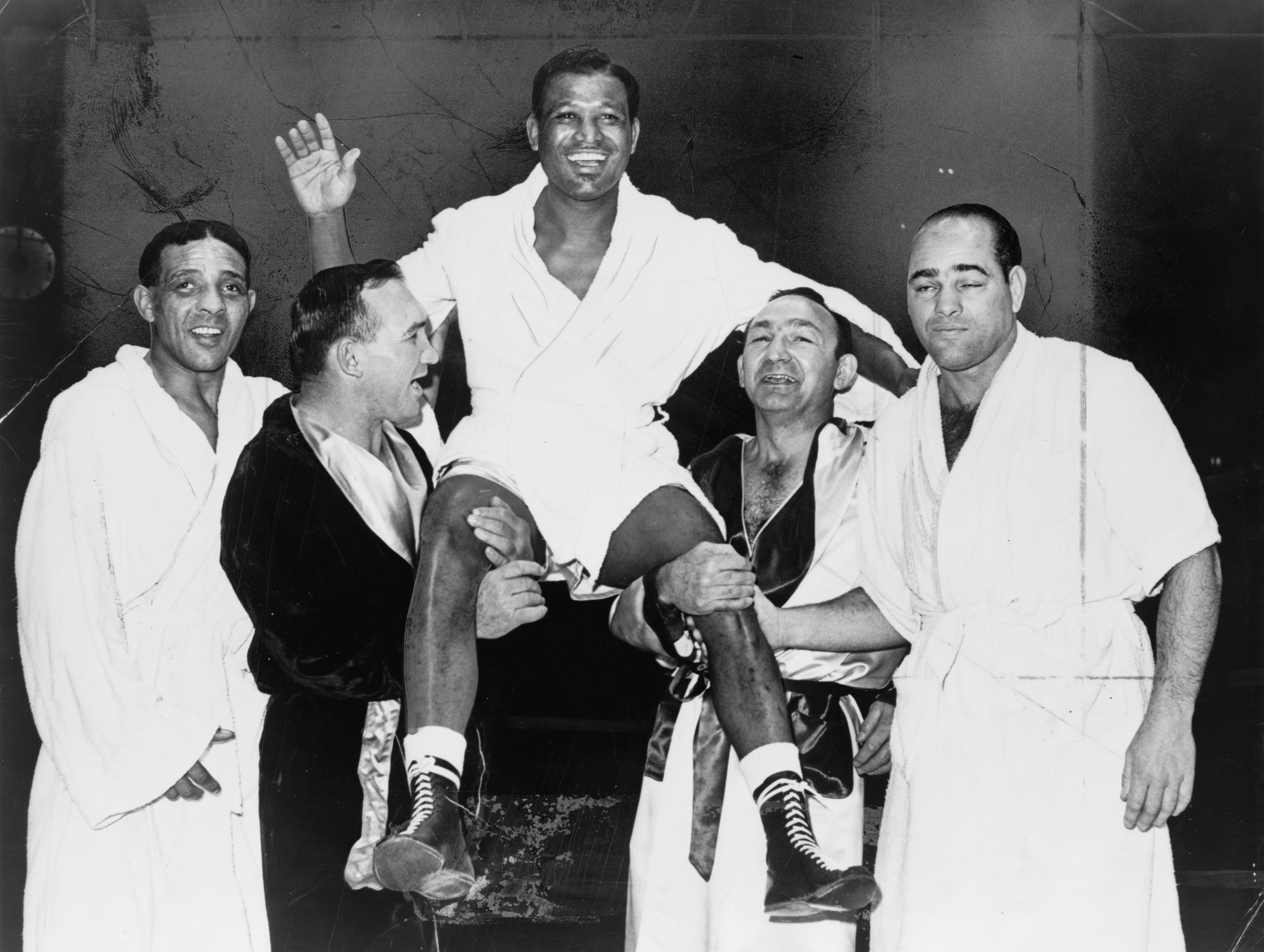
Robinson being held aloft by Gene Fullmer and Carmen Basilio in 1965

Robinson has been ranked as the greatest boxer of all time by sportswriters, fellow boxers, and trainers. The phrase "pound for pound" was created by sportswriters for him during his career as a way to compare boxers irrespective of weight. Hall of Fame fighters Muhammad Ali, Joe Louis, Roberto Durán and Sugar Ray Leonard have ranked Robinson as the greatest pound-for-pound boxer in history. The Sporting News recognized Robinson as the Fighter of the Decade for the 1950s. In 1997, The Ring ranked him as the best pound-for-pound fighter in history, and in 1999 he was named "welterweight of the century", "middleweight of the century", and overall "fighter of the century" by the Associated Press. In 2007 ESPN.com featured the piece "50 Greatest Boxers of All Time", in which it named Robinson the top boxer in history. In 2003, The Ring ranked him number 11 in the list of all-time greatest punchers. Robinson was also ranked as the number 1 welterweight and the number 1 pound-for-pound boxer of all time by the International Boxing Research Organization. He was inducted into the Madison Square Garden Walk of Fame at its inception in 1992.

Robinson was one of the first African Americans to establish himself as a star outside sports. He was an integral part of the New York social scene in the 1940s and 1950s. His glamorous restaurant, Sugar Ray's, hosted stars including Frank Sinatra, Jackie Gleason, Nat King Cole, Joe Louis, and Lena Horne. Robinson was known as a flamboyant personality outside the ring. He combined striking good looks with charisma and a flair for the dramatic. He drove a flamingo-pink Cadillac and was an accomplished singer and dancer, who once pursued a career in the entertainment industry.

According to ESPN's Ron Flatter: "He was the pioneer of boxing's bigger-than-life entourages, including a secretary, barber, masseur, voice coach, a coterie of trainers, beautiful women, a dwarf mascot and lifelong manager George Gainford." When Robinson first traveled to Paris, a steward referred to his companions as his "entourage". Although Robinson said he did not like the word's literal definition of "attendants", since he felt they were his friends, he liked the word itself and began to use it in regular conversation when referring to them. In 1962, in an effort to persuade Robinson to return to Paris—where he was still a national hero—the French promised to bring over his masseur, his hairdresser, a man who would whistle while he trained, and his trademark Cadillac. This larger-than-life persona made him the idol of millions of African American youths in the 1950s. Robinson inspired several other fighters who took the nickname "Sugar" in homage to him: Sugar Ray Leonard, Sugar Shane Mosley, and MMA fighter "Suga" Rashad Evans. Sugar Ray Leonard said, "Someone once said there was a comparison between Sugar Ray Leonard and Sugar Ray Robinson. Believe me, there's no comparison. Sugar Ray Robinson was the greatest." Laurence Holder wrote a play about him entitled Sugar Ray in 2016.

== Professional boxing record ==
201 fights	174 wins	19 losses
By knockout	109	1
By decision	65	18
Draws	6	
No contests	2	

No.	Result	Record	Opponent	Type	Round, time	Date	Age	Location	Notes
201	Loss	174–19–6 (2)	Joey Archer	UD	10	Nov 10, 1965	44 years, 191 days	Civic Arena, Pittsburgh, Pennsylvania, U.S.	
200	Win	174–18–6 (2)	Rudolph Bent	TKO	3 (10), 2:20	Oct 20, 1965	44 years, 170 days	Community Arena, Steubenville, Ohio, U.S.	
199	Win	173–18–6 (2)	Peter Schmidt	UD	10	Oct 1, 1965	44 years, 151 days	Cambria County War Memorial Arena, Johnstown, Pennsylvania, U.S.	
198	Win	172–18–6 (2)	Harvey McCullough	UD	10	Sep 23, 1965	44 years, 143 days	Philadelphia Athletic Club, Philadelphia, Pennsylvania, U.S.	
197	NC	171–18–6 (2)	Neil Morrison	NC	2 (10), 1:20	Sep 15, 1965	44 years, 135 days	Norfolk Arena, Norfolk, Virginia, U.S.	
196	Loss	171–18–6 (1)	Stan Harrington	UD	10	Aug 10, 1965	44 years, 99 days	Honolulu International Center, Honolulu, Hawaii, U.S.	
195	Win	171–17–6 (1)	Harvey McCullough	UD	10	Jul 27, 1965	44 years, 85 days	Richmond Arena, Richmond, Virginia, U.S.	
194	Loss	170–17–6 (1)	Ferd Hernandez	SD	10	Jul 12, 1965	44 years, 70 days	Hacienda, Paradise, Nevada, U.S.	
193	Win	170–16–6 (1)	Harvey McCullough	UD	10	Jun 24, 1965	44 years, 52 days	Washington Coliseum, Washington, D.C., U.S.	
192	Loss	169–16–6 (1)	Stan Harrington	UD	10	Jun 1, 1965	44 years, 29 days	Honolulu International Center, Honolulu, Hawaii, U.S.	
191	Loss	169–15–6 (1)	Memo Ayón	UD	10	May 24, 1965	44 years, 21 days	Plaza de Toros El Toreo, Tijuana, Mexico	
190	Win	169–14–6 (1)	Rocky Randell	KO	3 (10), 0:58	Apr 28, 1965	43 years, 360 days	Norfolk Municipal Auditorium, Norfolk, Virginia, U.S.	
189	Win	168–14–6 (1)	Earl Bastings	KO	1 (10), 2:34	Apr 3, 1965	43 years, 335 days	Sports Center, Savannah, Georgia, U.S.	
188	Win	167–14–6 (1)	Jimmy Beecham	KO	2 (10), 1:48	Mar 6, 1965	43 years, 307 days	National Stadium, Kingston, Jamaica	
187	Draw	166–14–6 (1)	Fabio Bettini	PTS	10	Nov 27, 1964	43 years, 208 days	Palazzetto dello Sport, Rome, Italy	
186	Win	166–14–5 (1)	Jean Beltritti	PTS	10	Nov 14, 1964	43 years, 195 days	Palais des Sports de Marseille, Marseille, France	
185	Win	165–14–5 (1)	Jean Baptiste Rolland	PTS	10	Nov 7, 1964	43 years, 188 days	Stade Helitas, Caen, France	
184	Win	164–14–5 (1)	Jackie Cailleau	PTS	10	Oct 24, 1964	43 years, 174 days	Palais des Sports, Nice, France	
183	Win	163–14–5 (1)	Johnny Angel	TKO	6 (8)	Oct 12, 1964	43 years, 162 days	London Hilton, London, England	
182	Win	162–14–5 (1)	Yoland Leveque	PTS	10	Sep 28, 1964	43 years, 148 days	Palais des Sports, Paris, France	
181	Loss	161–14–5 (1)	Mick Leahy	PTS	10	Sep 3, 1964	43 years, 123 days	Paisley Ice Rink, Paisley, Scotland	
180	Draw	161–13–5 (1)	Art Hernández	MD	10	Jul 27, 1964	43 years, 85 days	Omaha City Auditorium, Omaha, Nebraska, U.S.	
179	Win	161–13–4 (1)	Clarence Riley	TKO	6 (10), 2:40	Jul 8, 1964	43 years, 66 days	Wahconah Park, Pittsfield, Massachusetts, U.S.	
178	Win	160–13–4 (1)	Gaylord Barnes	UD	10	May 19, 1964	43 years, 16 days	Portland Exposition Building, Portland, Maine, U.S.	
177	Win	159–13–4 (1)	Armand Vanucci	PTS	10	Dec 9, 1963	42 years, 220 days	Palais des Sports, Paris, France	
176	Win	158–13–4 (1)	Andre Davier	PTS	10	Nov 29, 1963	42 years, 210 days	Palais des Sports, Grenoble, France	
175	Win	157–13–4 (1)	Emiel Sarens	KO	8 (10)	Nov 16, 1963	42 years, 197 days	Palais des Sports, Brussels, Belgium	
174	Draw	156–13–4 (1)	Fabio Bettini	PTS	10	Nov 9, 1963	42 years, 190 days	Palais des Sports de Gerland, Lyon, France	
173	Win	156–13–3 (1)	Armand Vanucci	PTS	10	Oct 14, 1963	42 years, 164 days	Palais des Sports, Paris, France	
172	Loss	155–13–3 (1)	Joey Giardello	UD	10	Jun 24, 1963	42 years, 52 days	Philadelphia Convention Hall, Philadelphia, Pennsylvania, U.S.	
171	Win	155–12–3 (1)	Maurice Roblet	KO	3 (10)	May 4, 1963	42 years, 1 day	Palais des Sports Léopold-Drolet, Quebec, Canada	
170	Win	154–12–3 (1)	Billy Thornton	KO	3 (10), 0:50	Mar 11, 1963	41 years, 312 days	Lewiston Armory, Lewiston, Maine, U.S.	
169	Win	153–12–3 (1)	Bernie Reynolds	KO	4 (10)	Feb 25, 1963	41 years, 298 days	Estadio Quisqueya, Santo Domingo, Dominican Republic	
168	Win	152–12–3 (1)	Ralph Dupas	SD	10	Jan 30, 1963	41 years, 272 days	Miami Beach Convention Center, Miami Beach, Florida, U.S.	
167	Win	151–12–3 (1)	Georges Estatoff	TKO	6 (10)	Nov 10, 1962	41 years, 191 days	Palais des Sports de Gerland, Lyon, France	
166	Win	150–12–3 (1)	Diego Infantes	KO	2 (10), 1:15	Oct 17, 1962	41 years, 167 days	Wiener Stadthalle, Vienna, Austria	
165	Loss	149–12–3 (1)	Terry Downes	PTS	10	Sep 25, 1962	41 years, 145 days	Empire Pool, London, England	
164	Loss	149–11–3 (1)	Phil Moyer	SD	10	Jul 9, 1962	41 years, 67 days	Los Angeles Sports Arena, Los Angeles, California, U.S.	
163	Win	149–10–3 (1)	Bobby Lee	KO	2 (10), 2:38	Apr 27, 1962	40 years, 359 days	National Stadium, Port of Spain, Trinidad and Tobago	
162	Loss	148–10–3 (1)	Denny Moyer	UD	10	Feb 17, 1962	40 years, 290 days	Madison Square Garden, New York City, New York, U.S.	
161	Win	148–9–3 (1)	Wilf Greaves	KO	8 (10), 0:43	Dec 8, 1961	40 years, 219 days	Civic Arena, Pittsburgh, Pennsylvania, U.S.	
160	Win	147–9–3 (1)	Al Hauser	TKO	6 (10), 1:59	Nov 20, 1961	40 years, 201 days	Rhode Island Auditorium, Providence, Rhode Island, U.S.	
159	Win	146–9–3 (1)	Denny Moyer	UD	10	Oct 21, 1961	40 years, 171 days	Madison Square Garden, New York City, New York, U.S.	
158	Win	145–9–3 (1)	Wilf Greaves	SD	10	Sep 25, 1961	40 years, 145 days	Convention Arena, Detroit, Michigan, U.S.	
157	Loss	144–9–3 (1)	Gene Fullmer	UD	15	Mar 4, 1961	39 years, 305 days	Boston Garden, Boston, Massachusetts, U.S.	For NBA middleweight title
156	Draw	144–8–3 (1)	Gene Fullmer	SD	15	Dec 3, 1960	39 years, 214 days	Boston Garden, Boston, Massachusetts, U.S.	For NBA middleweight title
155	Loss	144–8–2 (1)	Paul Pender	SD	15	Jun 10, 1960	39 years, 38 days	Boston Garden, Boston, Massachusetts, U.S.	For NYSAC and The Ring middleweight titles
154	Win	144–7–2 (1)	Tony Baldoni	KO	1 (10), 1:40	Apr 2, 1960	38 years, 335 days	Baltimore Coliseum, Baltimore, Maryland, U.S.	
152	Loss	143–7–2 (1)	Paul Pender	SD	15	Jan 22, 1960	38 years, 264 days	Boston Garden, Boston, Massachusetts, U.S.	Lost NYSAC and The Ring middleweight titles
152	Win	143–6–2 (1)	Bob Young	KO	2 (10), 1:18	Dec 14, 1959	38 years, 225 days	Chicago Stadium, Chicago, Illinois, U.S.	
151	Win	142–6–2 (1)	Carmen Basilio	SD	15	Mar 25, 1958	36 years, 326 days	Chicago Stadium, Chicago, Illinois, U.S.	Won NYSAC, NBA, and The Ring middleweight titles
150	Loss	141–6–2 (1)	Carmen Basilio	SD	15	Sep 23, 1957	36 years, 143 days	Yankee Stadium, Bronx, New York, U.S.	Lost NYSAC, NBA, and The Ring middleweight titles
149	Win	141–5–2 (1)	Gene Fullmer	KO	5 (15), 1:27	May 1, 1957	35 years, 363 days	Chicago Stadium, Chicago, Illinois, U.S.	Won NYSAC, NBA, and The Ring middleweight titles
148	Loss	140–5–2 (1)	Gene Fullmer	UD	15	Jan 2, 1957	35 years, 244 days	Madison Square Garden, New York City, New York, U.S.	Lost NYSAC, NBA, and The Ring middleweight titles
147	Win	140–4–2 (1)	Bob Provizzi	UD	10	Nov 10, 1956	35 years, 191 days	New Haven Arena, New Haven, Connecticut, U.S.	
146	Win	139–4–2 (1)	Bobo Olson	KO	4 (15), 2:51	May 18, 1956	35 years, 15 days	Wrigley Field, Los Angeles, California, U.S.	Retained NYSAC, NBA, and The Ring middleweight titles
145	Win	138–4–2 (1)	Bobo Olson	KO	2 (15), 2:51	Dec 9, 1955	34 years, 220 days	Chicago Stadium, Chicago, Illinois, U.S.	Won NYSAC, NBA, and The Ring middleweight titles
144	Win	137–4–2 (1)	Rocky Castellani	SD	10	Jul 22, 1955	34 years, 80 days	Cow Palace, Daly City, California, U.S.	
143	Win	136–4–2 (1)	Garth Panter	UD	10	May 4, 1955	34 years, 1 day	Olympia Stadium, Detroit, Michigan, U.S.	
142	Win	135–4–2 (1)	Ted Olla	TKO	3 (10), 2:15	Apr 14, 1955	33 years, 346 days	Milwaukee Arena, Milwaukee, Wisconsin, U.S.	
141	Win	134–4–2 (1)	Johnny Lombardo	SD	10	Mar 29, 1955	33 years, 330 days	Cincinnati Gardens, Cincinnati, Ohio, U.S.	
140	Loss	133–4–2 (1)	Ralph Jones	UD	10	Jan 19, 1955	33 years, 261 days	Chicago Stadium, Chicago, Illinois, U.S.	
139	Win	133–3–2 (1)	Joe Rindone	KO	6 (10), 1:37	Jan 5, 1955	33 years, 247 days	Olympia Stadium, Detroit, Michigan, U.S.	
138	Loss	132–3–2 (1)	Joey Maxim	RTD	13 (15)	Jun 25, 1952	31 years, 53 days	Yankee Stadium, Bronx, New York, U.S.	For NYSAC, NBA, and The Ring light heavyweight titles
137	Win	132–2–2 (1)	Rocky Graziano	KO	3 (15), 1:53	Apr 14, 1952	30 years, 347 days	Chicago Stadium, Chicago, Illinois, U.S.	Retained NYSAC, NBA, and The Ring middleweight titles
136	Win	131–2–2 (1)	Bobo Olson	UD	15	Mar 13, 1952	30 years, 315 days	San Francisco Civic Auditorium, San Francisco, California, U.S.	Retained NYSAC, NBA, and The Ring middleweight titles
135	Win	130–2–2 (1)	Randolph Turpin	TKO	10 (15), 2:52	Sep 12, 1951	30 years, 132 days	Polo Grounds, New York City, New York, U.S.	Won NYSAC, NBA, and The Ring middleweight titles
134	Loss	129–2–2 (1)	Randolph Turpin	PTS	15	Jul 10, 1951	30 years, 68 days	Earls Court Arena, London, England	Lost NYSAC, NBA, and The Ring middleweight titles
133	Win	129–1–2 (1)	Cyrille Delannoit	RTD	3 (10)	Jul 1, 1951	30 years, 59 days	Palazzo Dello Sport, Turin, Italy	
132	NC	128–1–2 (1)	Gerhard Hecht	NC	2 (10)	Jun 24, 1951	30 years, 52 days	Waldbühne, Berlin, Germany	
131	Win	128–1–2	Jean Walzack	TKO	6 (10)	Jun 16, 1951	30 years, 44 days	Palais des Sports, Liège, Belgium	
130	Win	127–1–2	Jan de Bruin	TKO	8 (10)	Jun 10, 1951	30 years, 38 days	Sportpaleis, Antwerp, Belgium	
129	Win	126–1–2	Jean Wanes	UD	10	May 26, 1951	30 years, 23 days	Hallenstadion, Zürich, Switzerland	
128	Win	125–1–2	Kid Marcel	TKO	5 (10)	May 21, 1951	30 years, 18 days	Palais des Sports, Paris, France	
127	Win	124–1–2	Don Ellis	KO	1 (10), 1:36	Apr 9, 1951	29 years, 341 days	Municipal Auditorium, Oklahoma City, Oklahoma, U.S.	
126	Win	123–1–2	Holly Mims	UD	10	Apr 5, 1951	29 years, 337 days	Miami Stadium, Miami, Florida, U.S.	
125	Win	122–1–2	Jake LaMotta	TKO	13 (15), 2:04	Feb 14, 1951	29 years, 287 days	Chicago Stadium, Chicago, Illinois, U.S.	Won NYSAC, NBA and The Ring middleweight titles
124	Win	121–1–2	Hans Stretz	TKO	5 (10)	Dec 25, 1950	29 years, 236 days	Haus der Technik, Frankfurt, Germany	
123	Win	120–1–2	Robert Villemain	TKO	9 (10)	Dec 22, 1950	29 years, 233 days	Palais des Sports, Paris, France	
122	Win	119–1–2	Jean Walzack	UD	10	Dec 16, 1950	29 years, 227 days	Palais des Expositions, Geneva, Switzerland	
121	Win	118–1–2	Luc van Dam	KO	4 (10)	Dec 9, 1950	29 years, 220 days	Palais des Sports, Brussels, Belgium	
120	Win	117–1–2	Jean Stock	TKO	2 (10)	Nov 27, 1950	29 years, 208 days	Palais des Sports, Paris, France	
119	Win	116–1–2	Bobby Dykes	MD	10	Nov 8, 1950	29 years, 189 days	Chicago Stadium, Chicago, Illinois, U.S.	
118	Win	115–1–2	Bobo Olson	KO	12 (15), 1:19	Oct 26, 1950	29 years, 176 days	Philadelphia Convention Hall, Philadelphia, Pennsylvania, U.S.	Retained Pennsylvania State middleweight title
117	Win	114–1–2	Joe Rindone	TKO	6 (10), 0:55	Oct 16, 1950	29 years, 166 days	Boston Garden, Boston, Massachusetts, U.S.	
116	Win	113–1–2	Billy Brown	UD	10	Sep 4, 1950	29 years, 124 days	Coney Island Velodrome, Brooklyn, New York, U.S.	
115	Win	112–1–2	José Basora	KO	1 (15), 0:55	Aug 25, 1950	29 years, 114 days	Scranton Stadium, Scranton, Pennsylvania, U.S	Retained Pennsylvania State middleweight title
114	Win	111–1–2	Charley Fusari	PTS	15	Aug 9, 1950	29 years, 98 days	Roosevelt Stadium, Jersey City, New Jersey, U.S	Retained NYSAC, NBA, and The Ring welterweight titles
113	Win	110–1–2	Robert Villemain	UD	15	Jun 5, 1950	29 years, 33 days	Philadelphia Municipal Stadium, Philadelphia, Pennsylvania, U.S	Won vacant Pennsylvania State middleweight title
112	Win	109–1–2	Ray Barnes	UD	10	Apr 28, 1950	28 years, 360 days	Olympia Stadium, Detroit, Michigan, U.S.	
111	Win	108–1–2	Cliff Beckett	TKO	3 (10), 1:45	Apr 21, 1950	28 years, 353 days	Memorial Hall, Columbus, Ohio, U.S.	
110	Win	107–1–2	George Costner	KO	1 (10), 2:49	Mar 22, 1950	28 years, 323 days	Philadelphia Convention Hall, Pittsburgh, Pennsylvania, U.S.	
109	Win	106–1–2	Jean Walzack	UD	10	Feb 27, 1950	28 years, 300 days	St. Louis Arena, St. Louis, Missouri, U.S.	
108	Win	105–1–2	Aaron Wade	KO	3 (10)	Feb 22, 1950	28 years, 295 days	Municipal Auditorium, Savannah, Georgia, U.S.	
107	Win	104–1–2	Johnny Dudley	KO	2 (12), 0:40	Feb 18, 1950	28 years, 291 days	Municipal Stadium, Orlando, Florida, U.S.	
106	Win	103–1–2	Al Mobley	TKO	6 (10)	Feb 13, 1950	28 years, 286 days	Coliseum Arena, Miami, Florida, U.S.	
105	Win	102–1–2	George LaRover	TKO	4 (10), 1:38	Jan 30, 1950	28 years, 272 days	New Haven Arena, New Haven, Connecticut, U.S.	
104	Win	101–1–2	Vern Lester	KO	5 (10), 0:12	Nov 13, 1949	28 years, 194 days	Coliseum Arena, New Orleans, Louisiana, U.S.	
103	Win	100–1–2	Don Lee	UD	10	Nov 9, 1949	28 years, 190 days	Denver Auditorium Arena, Denver, Colorado, U.S.	
102	Win	99–1–2	Charley Dodson	KO	3 (10), 0:20	Sep 12, 1949	28 years, 132 days	Houston City Auditorium, Houston, Texas, U.S.	
101	Win	98–1–2	Benny Evans	TKO	5 (10), 2:56	Sep 9, 1949	28 years, 129 days	Omaha City Auditorium, Omaha, Nebraska, U.S.	
100	Win	97–1–2	Steve Belloise	RTD	7 (10)	Aug 24, 1949	28 years, 113 days	Yankee Stadium, Bronx, New York, U.S.	
99	Win	96–1–2	Kid Gavilán	UD	15	Jul 11, 1949	28 years, 69 days	Philadelphia Municipal Stadium, Philadelphia, Pennsylvania, U.S.	Retained NYSAC, NBA, and The Ring welterweight titles
98	Win	95–1–2	Cecil Hudson	KO	5 (10)	Jun 20, 1949	28 years, 48 days	Rhode Island Auditorium, Providence, Rhode Island, U.S.	
97	Win	94–1–2	Freddie Flores	TKO	3 (10), 2:41	Jun 7, 1949	28 years, 35 days	Page Arena, New Bedford, Massachusetts, U.S.	
96	Win	93–1–2	Earl Turner	TKO	8 (10), 1:51	Apr 20, 1949	27 years, 352 days	Oakland Auditorium, Oakland, California, U.S.	
95	Win	92–1–2	Don Lee	UD	10	Apr 11, 1949	27 years, 343 days	Omaha City Auditorium, Omaha, Nebraska, U.S.	
94	Win	91–1–2	Bobby Lee	UD	10	Mar 25, 1949	27 years, 326 days	Chicago Stadium, Chicago, Illinois, U.S.	
93	Draw	90–1–2	Henry Brimm	SD	10	Feb 15, 1949	27 years, 288 days	Buffalo Memorial Auditorium, Buffalo, New York, U.S.	
92	Win	90–1–1	Young Gene Buffalo	KO	1 (10), 2:55	Feb 10, 1949	27 years, 283 days	Kingston Armory, Kingston, Pennsylvania, U.S.	
91	Win	89–1–1	Bobby Lee	UD	10	Nov 15, 1948	27 years, 196 days	Philadelphia Arena, Philadelphia, Pennsylvania, U.S.	
90	Win	88–1–1	Kid Gavilán	UD	10	Sep 23, 1948	27 years, 143 days	Yankee Stadium, Bronx New York, U.S.	
89	Win	87–1–1	Bernard Docusen	UD	15	Jun 28, 1948	27 years, 56 days	Comiskey Park, Chicago, Illinois, U.S.	Retained NYSAC, NBA, and The Ring welterweight titles
88	Win	86–1–1	Henry Brimm	UD	10	Mar 16, 1948	26 years, 318 days	Buffalo Memorial Auditorium, Buffalo, New York, U.S.	
87	Win	85–1–1	Ossie Harris	UD	10	Mar 4, 1948	26 years, 306 days	Toledo Sports Arena, Toledo, Ohio, U.S.	
86	Win	84–1–1	Chuck Taylor	TKO	6 (15), 2:07	Dec 19, 1947	26 years, 230 days	Olympia Stadium, Detroit, Michigan, U.S.	Retained NYSAC, NBA, and The Ring welterweight titles
85	Win	83–1–1	Billy Nixon	TKO	6 (10), 2:10	Dec 10, 1947	26 years, 221 days	Elizabeth Armory, Elizabeth, New Jersey, U.S.	
84	Win	82–1–1	California Jackie Wilson	TKO	7 (10), 1:35	Oct 28, 1947	26 years, 178 days	Olympic Auditorium, Los Angeles, California, U.S.	
83	Win	81–1–1	Flashy Sebastian	KO	1 (10), 1:02	Aug 29, 1947	26 years, 118 days	Madison Square Garden, New York City, New York, U.S.	
82	Win	80–1–1	Sammy Secreet	KO	1 (10), 1:50	Aug 21, 1947	26 years, 110 days	Rubber Bowl, Akron, Ohio, U.S.	
81	Win	79–1–1	Jimmy Doyle	TKO	8 (15)	Jun 24, 1947	26 years, 52 days	Cleveland Arena, Cleveland, Ohio, U.S.	Retained NYSAC, NBA, and The Ring welterweight titles; Doyle died of injuries sustained from the fight.
80	Win	78–1–1	Georgie Abrams	SD	10	May 16, 1947	26 years, 13 days	Madison Square Garden, New York City, New York, U.S.	
79	Win	77–1–1	Eddie Finazzo	TKO	4 (10), 2:30	Apr 8, 1947	25 years, 340 days	Memorial Hall, Kansas City, Kansas, U.S.	
78	Win	76–1–1	Freddie Wilson	TKO	3 (10), 1:10	Apr 3, 1947	25 years, 335 days	Akron Armory, Akron, Ohio, U.S.	
77	Win	75–1–1	Bernie Miller	TKO	3 (10), 1:32	Mar 27, 1947	25 years, 328 days	Dorsey Park, Miami, Florida, U.S.	
76	Win	74–1–1	Tommy Bell	UD	15	Dec 20, 1946	25 years, 231 days	Cleveland Arena, Cleveland, Ohio, U.S.	Won vacant NYSAC, NBA, and The Ring welterweight titles
75	Win	73–1–1	Artie Levine	KO	10 (10), 2:41	Nov 6, 1946	25 years, 187 days	Cleveland Arena, Cleveland, Ohio, U.S.	
74	Win	72–1–1	Cecil Hudson	KO	6 (10), 2:58	Nov 1, 1946	25 years, 182 days	Olympia Stadium, Detroit, Michigan, U.S.	
73	Win	71–1–1	Ossie Harris	UD	10	Oct 7, 1946	25 years, 157 days	Forbes Field, Pittsburgh, Pennsylvania, U.S.	
72	Win	70–1–1	Sidney Miller	KO	3 (10), 1:52	Sep 25, 1946	25 years, 145 days	Twin City Bowl, Elizabeth, New Jersey, U.S.	
71	Win	69–1–1	Vinnie Vines	KO	6 (10), 2:46	Aug 15, 1946	25 years, 104 days	Hawkins Stadium, Albany, New York, U.S.	
70	Win	68–1–1	Joe Curcio	KO	2 (10), 0:10	Jul 12, 1946	25 years, 70 days	Madison Square Garden, New York City, New York, U.S.	
69	Win	67–1–1	Norman Rubio	PTS	10	Jun 25, 1946	25 years, 53 days	Roosevelt Stadium, Union City, New Jersey, U.S.	
68	Win	66–1–1	Freddie Wilson	KO	2 (10), 2:00	Jun 12, 1946	25 years, 40 days	Worcester Auditorium, Worcester, Massachusetts, U.S.	
67	Win	65–1–1	Freddie Flores	KO	5 (10), 2:52	Mar 21, 1946	24 years, 322 days	Golden Gate Arena, New York City, New York, U.S.	
66	Win	64–1–1	Izzy Jannazzo	UD	10	Mar 14, 1946	24 years, 315 days	Fifth Regiment Armory, Baltimore, Maryland, U.S.	
65	Win	63–1–1	Sammy Angott	UD	10	Mar 4, 1946	24 years, 305 days	Duquesne Gardens, Pittsburgh, Pennsylvania, U.S.	
64	Win	62–1–1	Cliff Beckett	KO	4 (10), 0:40	Feb 27, 1946	24 years, 300 days	St. Louis Arena, St. Louis, Missouri, U.S.	
63	Win	61–1–1	O'Neil Bell	KO	2 (10), 1:10	Feb 15, 1946	24 years, 288 days	Olympia Stadium, Detroit, Michigan, U.S.	
62	Win	60–1–1	Tony Riccio	TKO	4 (10), 2:16	Feb 5, 1946	24 years, 278 days	Elizabeth Armory, Elizabeth, New Jersey, U.S.	
61	Win	59–1–1	Dave Clark	TKO	2 (10), 2:22	Jan 14, 1946	24 years, 256 days	Duquesne Gardens, Pittsburgh, Pennsylvania, U.S.	
60	Win	58–1–1	Vic Dellicurti	UD	10	Dec 4, 1945	24 years, 215 days	Boston Garden, Boston, Massachusetts, U.S.	
59	Win	57–1–1	Jake LaMotta	SD	12	Sep 26, 1945	24 years, 146 days	Comiskey Park, Chicago, Illinois, U.S.	
58	Win	56–1–1	Jimmy Mandell	TKO	5 (10), 1:31	Sep 18, 1945	24 years, 138 days	Buffalo Memorial Auditorium, Buffalo, New York, U.S.	
57	Win	55–1–1	Jimmy McDaniels	KO	2 (10), 1:23	Jun 15, 1945	24 years, 43 days	Madison Square Garden, New York City, New York, U.S.	
56	Draw	54–1–1	José Basora	SD	10	May 14, 1945	24 years, 11 days	Philadelphia Convention Hall, Pittsburgh, Pennsylvania, U.S.	
55	Win	54–1	Jake LaMotta	UD	10	Feb 23, 1945	23 years, 296 days	Madison Square Garden, New York City, New York, U.S.	
54	Win	53–1	George Costner	KO	1 (10), 2:55	Feb 14, 1945	23 years, 287 days	Chicago Stadium, Chicago, Illinois, U.S.	
53	Win	52–1	Tommy Bell	UD	10	Jan 16, 1945	23 years, 258 days	Cleveland Arena, Cleveland, Ohio, U.S.	
52	Win	51–1	Billy Furrone	TKO	2 (10), 2:28	Jan 10, 1945	23 years, 252 days	Uline Arena, Washington, D.C., U.S.	
51	Win	50–1	George Martin	TKO	7 (10), 3:00	Dec 22, 1944	23 years, 233 days	Boston Garden, Boston, Massachusetts, U.S.	
50	Win	49–1	Sheik Rangel	TKO	2 (10), 2:50	Dec 12, 1944	23 years, 223 days	Philadelphia Convention Hall, Pittsburgh, Pennsylvania, U.S.	
49	Win	48–1	Vic Dellicurti	UD	10	Nov 24, 1944	23 years, 205 days	Olympia Stadium, Detroit, Michigan, U.S.	
48	Win	47–1	Lou Woods	TKO	9 (10), 2:10	Oct 27, 1944	23 years, 177 days	Chicago Stadium, Chicago, Illinois, U.S.	
47	Win	46–1	Izzy Jannazzo	KO	2 (10), 1:10	Oct 13, 1944	23 years, 163 days	Boston Garden, Boston, Massachusetts, U.S.	
46	Win	45–1	Henry Armstrong	UD	10	Aug 27, 1943	22 years, 116 days	Madison Square Garden, New York City, New York, U.S.	
45	Win	44–1	Ralph Zannelli	UD	10	Jul 1, 1943	22 years, 59 days	Boston Garden, Boston, Massachusetts, U.S.	
44	Win	43–1	Freddie Cabral	KO	1 (10), 2:20	Apr 30, 1943	21 years, 362 days	Boston Garden, Boston, Massachusetts, U.S.	
43	Win	42–1	Jake LaMotta	UD	10	Feb 26, 1943	21 years, 299 days	Madison Square Garden, New York City, New York, U.S.	
42	Win	41–1	California Jackie Wilson	MD	10	Feb 19, 1943	21 years, 292 days	Madison Square Garden, New York City, New York, U.S.	
41	Loss	40–1	Jake LaMotta	UD	10	Feb 5, 1943	21 years, 278 days	Olympia Stadium, Detroit, Michigan, U.S.	
40	Win	40–0	Al Nettlow	TKO	3 (10)	Dec 14, 1942	21 years, 225 days	Philadelphia Convention Hall, Pittsburgh, Pennsylvania, U.S.	
39	Win	39–0	Izzy Jannazzo	KO	8 (10), 2:43	Dec 1, 1942	21 years, 212 days	Cleveland Arena, Cleveland, Ohio, U.S.	
38	Win	38–0	Vic Dellicurti	UD	10	Nov 6, 1942	21 years, 187 days	Madison Square Garden, New York City, New York, U.S.	
37	Win	37–0	Izzy Jannazzo	UD	10	Oct 19, 1942	21 years, 169 days	Philadelphia Arena, Philadelphia, Pennsylvania, U.S.	
36	Win	36–0	Jake LaMotta	UD	10	Oct 2, 1942	21 years, 152 days	Madison Square Garden, New York City, New York, U.S.	
35	Win	35–0	Tony Motisi	KO	1 (10), 2:41	Aug 27, 1942	21 years, 116 days	Comiskey Park, Chicago, Illinois, U.S.	
34	Win	34–0	Reuben Shank	KO	2 (10), 2:26	Aug 21, 1942	21 years, 110 days	Madison Square Garden, New York City, New York, U.S.	
33	Win	33–0	Sammy Angott	UD	10	Jul 31, 1942	21 years, 89 days	Madison Square Garden, New York City, New York, U.S.	
32	Win	32–0	Marty Servo	SD	10	May 28, 1942	21 years, 25 days	Madison Square Garden, New York City, New York, U.S.	
31	Win	31–0	Dick Banner	KO	2 (10), 0:32	Apr 30, 1942	20 years, 362 days	Minneapolis Armory, Minneapolis, Minnesota, U.S.	
30	Win	30–0	Harvey Dubs	TKO	6 (10), 2:45	Apr 17, 1942	20 years, 349 days	Olympia Stadium, Detroit, Michigan, U.S.	
29	Win	29–0	Norman Rubio	TKO	7 (12), 3:00	Mar 20, 1942	20 years, 321 days	Madison Square Garden, New York City, New York, U.S.	
28	Win	28–0	Maxie Berger	TKO	2 (12), 1:43	Feb 20, 1942	20 years, 293 days	Madison Square Garden, New York City, New York, U.S.	
27	Win	27–0	Fritzie Zivic	TKO	10 (12), 0:31	Jan 16, 1942	20 years, 258 days	Madison Square Garden, New York City, New York, U.S.	
26	Win	26–0	Fritzie Zivic	UD	10	Oct 31, 1941	20 years, 181 days	Madison Square Garden, New York City, New York, U.S.	
25	Win	25–0	Marty Servo	UD	10	Sep 25, 1941	20 years, 145 days	Philadelphia Convention Hall, Pittsburgh, Pennsylvania, U.S.	
24	Win	24–0	Maxie Shapiro	TKO	3 (10), 2:04	Sep 19, 1941	20 years, 139 days	Madison Square Garden, New York City, New York, U.S.	
23	Win	23–0	Maurice Arnault	TKO	1 (8), 1:29	Aug 29, 1941	20 years, 118 days	Atlantic City Convention Hall, Atlantic City, New Jersey, U.S.	
22	Win	22–0	Carl Guggino	TKO	3 (8), 2:47	Aug 27, 1941	20 years, 116 days	Queensboro Arena, Queens, New York U.S.	
21	Win	21–0	Sammy Angott	UD	10	Jul 21, 1941	20 years, 79 days	Shibe Park, Philadelphia, Pennsylvania, U.S.	
20	Win	20–0	Pete Lello	TKO	4 (8), 1:48	Jul 2, 1941	20 years, 60 days	Polo Grounds, New York City, New York, U.S.	
19	Win	19–0	Mike Evans	KO	2 (8), 0:52	Jun 16, 1941	20 years, 44 days	Shibe Park, Philadelphia, Pennsylvania, U.S.	
18	Win	18–0	Nick Castiglione	KO	1 (10), 1:21	May 19, 1941	20 years, 16 days	Philadelphia Arena, Philadelphia, Pennsylvania, U.S.	
17	Win	17–0	Victor Troise	TKO	1 (8), 2:39	May 10, 1941	20 years, 7 days	Ridgewood Grove, Brooklyn, New York, U.S.	
16	Win	16–0	Joe Ghnouly	TKO	3 (8), 2:07	Apr 30, 1941	19 years, 362 days	Uline Arena, Washington, D.C., U.S.	
15	Win	15–0	Charley Burns	KO	1 (10), 2:35	Apr 24, 1941	19 years, 356 days	Waltz Dream Arena, Atlantic City, New Jersey, U.S.	
14	Win	14–0	Jimmy Tygh	TKO	1 (10), 1:51	Apr 14, 1941	19 years, 346 days	Philadelphia Arena, Philadelphia, Pennsylvania, U.S.	
13	Win	13–0	Jimmy Tygh	KO	8 (10), 1:13	Mar 3, 1941	19 years, 304 days	Philadelphia Arena, Philadelphia, Pennsylvania, U.S.	
12	Win	12–0	Gene Spencer	RTD	4 (6)	Feb 27, 1941	19 years, 300 days	Olympia Stadium, Detroit, Michigan, U.S.	
11	Win	11–0	Bobby McIntire	UD	6	Feb 21, 1941	19 years, 294 days	Madison Square Garden, New York City, New York, U.S.	
10	Win	10–0	Benny Cartagena	KO	1 (6), 1:33	Feb 8, 1941	19 years, 281 days	Ridgewood Grove, Brooklyn, New York, U.S.	
9	Win	9–0	George Zengaras	PTS	6	Jan 31, 1941	19 years, 273 days	Madison Square Garden, New York City, New York, U.S.	
8	Win	8–0	Frankie Wallace	TKO	1 (6), 2:10	Jan 13, 1941	19 years, 255 days	Philadelphia Arena, Philadelphia, Pennsylvania, U.S.	
7	Win	7–0	Tony Iacovacci	KO	1 (6), 0:40	Jan 4, 1941	19 years, 246 days	Ridgewood Grove, Brooklyn, New York, U.S.	
6	Win	6–0	Oliver White	TKO	3 (4)	Dec 13, 1940	19 years, 224 days	Madison Square Garden, New York City, New York, U.S.	
5	Win	5–0	Norment Quarles	TKO	4 (8), 0:56	Dec 9, 1940	19 years, 220 days	Philadelphia Arena, Philadelphia, Pennsylvania, U.S.	
4	Win	4–0	Bobby Woods	KO	1 (6), 1:31	Nov 11, 1940	19 years, 192 days	Philadelphia Arena, Philadelphia, Pennsylvania, U.S.	
3	Win	3–0	Mitsos Grispos	UD	6	Oct 22, 1940	19 years, 172 days	New York Coliseum, Bronx, New York, U.S.	
2	Win	2–0	Silent Stafford	TKO	2 (4)	Oct 8, 1940	19 years, 158 days	Municipal Auditorium, Savannah, Georgia, U.S.	
1	Win	1–0	Joe Echevarria	TKO	2 (4), 0:51	Oct 4, 1940	19 years, 154 days	Madison Square Garden, New York City, New York, U.S.	

== Titles in boxing ==
=== Major world titles ===
- NYSAC welterweight champion (147 lbs)
- NBA (WBA) welterweight champion (147 lbs)
- NYSAC middleweight champion (160 lbs) (5×)
- NBA (WBA) middleweight champion (160 lbs) (5×)

=== The Ring magazine titles ===
- The Ring welterweight champion (147 lbs)
- The Ring middleweight champion (160 lbs) (5×)

=== Regional/International titles ===
- Pennsylvania State middleweight champion (160 lbs)

=== Lineal titles ===
- Lineal welterweight champion (147 lbs)
- Lineal middleweight champion (160 lbs) (5×)

=== Undisputed titles ===
- Undisputed welterweight champion (147 lbs)
- Undisputed middleweight champion (160 lbs) (5×)

== Awards and honors ==
- 2× The Ring magazine Fighter of the Year in 1942 and 1951.
- Edward J. Neil Trophy (now known as the Sugar Ray Robinson Award in his honor) winner in 1950.
- Inducted into the International Boxing Hall of Fame's inaugural class of 1990.
- Inducted into the Michigan Sports Hall of Fame in 1991.
- Inducted into the Madison Square Garden Walk of Fame in 1992.
- Inducted into the Georgia Sports Hall of Fame in 2006.
- The United States Postal Service honored Robinson with a stamp in 2006.
- Inducted into the Martial Arts History Museum Hall of Fame in 2023.

== See also ==
- List of welterweight boxing champions
- List of middleweight boxing champions
- The Ring pound for pound

== Bibliography ==
- Boyd, Herb, and Robinson, Ray II. Pound for Pound: A Biography of Sugar Ray Robinson, New York: HarperCollins, 2005 ISBN 0-06-018876-6
- Chenault, Julie. Edna Mae Robinson Still Looking Good in Her Mink. Jet, Johnson Publishing Company November 5, 1981, issue ISSN 0021-5996 (available online)
- Donelson, Thomas, and Lotierzo, Frank. Viewing Boxing from Ringside, Lincoln: iUniverse, 2002 ISBN 0-595-23748-7
- Fitzgerald, Mike H., and Hudson, Dabid L. Boxing's Most Wanted: The Top Ten Book of Champs, Chumps and Punch-drunk Palookas, Virginia: Brassey's, 2004 ISBN 1-57488-714-9
- Hauser, Thomas. The Black Lights: Inside the World of Professional Boxing, Fayetteville: University of Arkansas Press, 2000 ISBN 1-55728-597-7
- Nagler, Barney. "Boxing's Bad Boy: Sugar Ray Robinson". SPORT Magazine. October 1947.
- Robinson, Sugar Ray, and Anderson, Dave. Sugar Ray, London: Da Capo Press, 1994 ISBN 0-306-80574-X
- Sammons, Jeffrey Thomas. Beyond the Ring: The Role of Boxing in American Society, Urbana: University of Illinois Press, 1998 ISBN 0-252-06145-4
- Wiley, Ralph. Serenity: A Boxing Memoir, Lincoln: University of Nebraska Press, 2000 ISBN 0-8032-9816-1

Sporting positions
World titles
Preceded by Marty Servo; Vacated	World Welterweight champion December 20, 1946 – December 25, 1950; Vacated	Vacant Title next held by Kid Gavilán
Preceded by Jake LaMotta	World Middleweight champion February 14, 1951 – July 10, 1951	Succeeded by Randy Turpin
Preceded by Randy Turpin	World Middleweight champion September 12, 1951 – December 19, 1952; Retired	Vacant Title next held by Carl Olson
Preceded by Carl Olson	World Middleweight champion May 18, 1956 – January 2, 1957	Succeeded by Gene Fullmer
Preceded by Gene Fullmer	World Middleweight champion May 1, 1957 – September 23, 1957	Succeeded by Carmen Basilio
Preceded by Carmen Basilio	NBA Middleweight champion March 25, 1958 – May 4, 1959; Stripped	Vacant Title next held by Gene Fullmer
Preceded by Carmen Basilio	World Middleweight champion March 25, 1958 – January 2, 1960	Succeeded by Paul Pender
Records
Preceded by Stanley Ketchel; 2	Most world title reigns in middleweight division 5 March 25, 1958 – present	Incumbent
