= Joe Echevarria =

American boxer

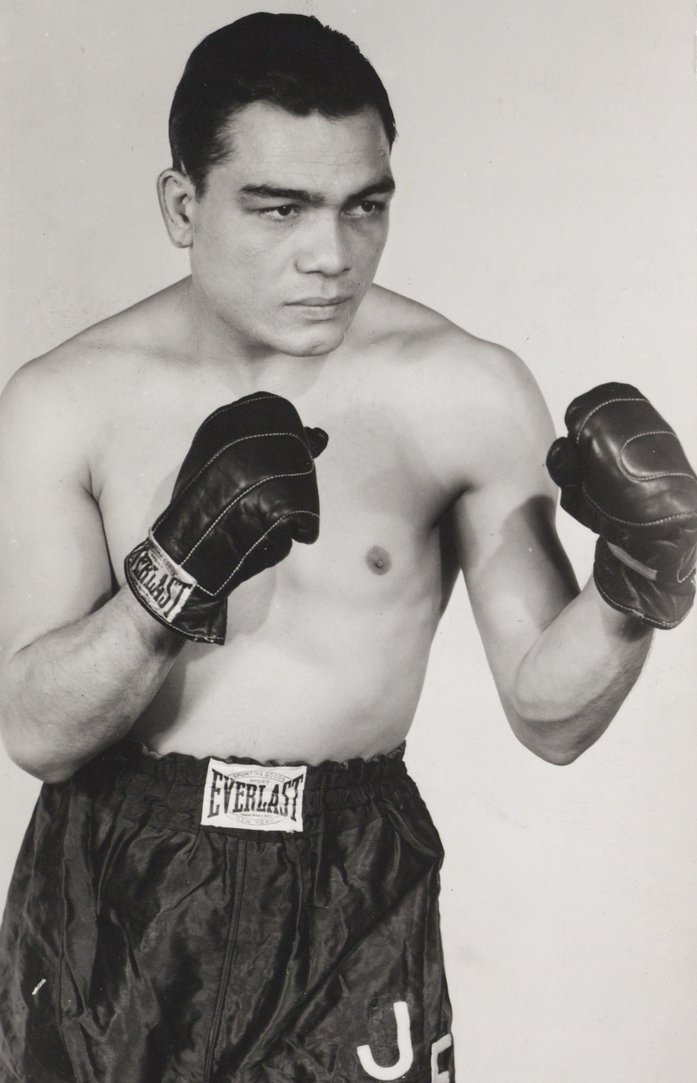
Joe Echevarria

Joe Echevarria (born in Mariveles, Bataan, Philippines) was Lightweight/Featherweight champion of the United States Army, United States Navy and of the Philippine Islands in 1929. He was notably asked to help train a then-amateur Sugar Ray Robinson, with the two eventually meeting in the latter's first professional fight in Madison Square Garden; Echevarria lost by knockout in the second round on October 4, 1940. He never fought again.

Known as "Baby Face Eche" or "Kid Eche", Echevarria had served as a cavalry instructor at the United States Military Academy in West Point, New York. Josue Reyes Echevarria was the son of Brigadier General Leopoldo Life Echevarria who fought against the Japanese occupation of the Philippines during the World War II.
