= Charley Fusari =

Italian-American boxer

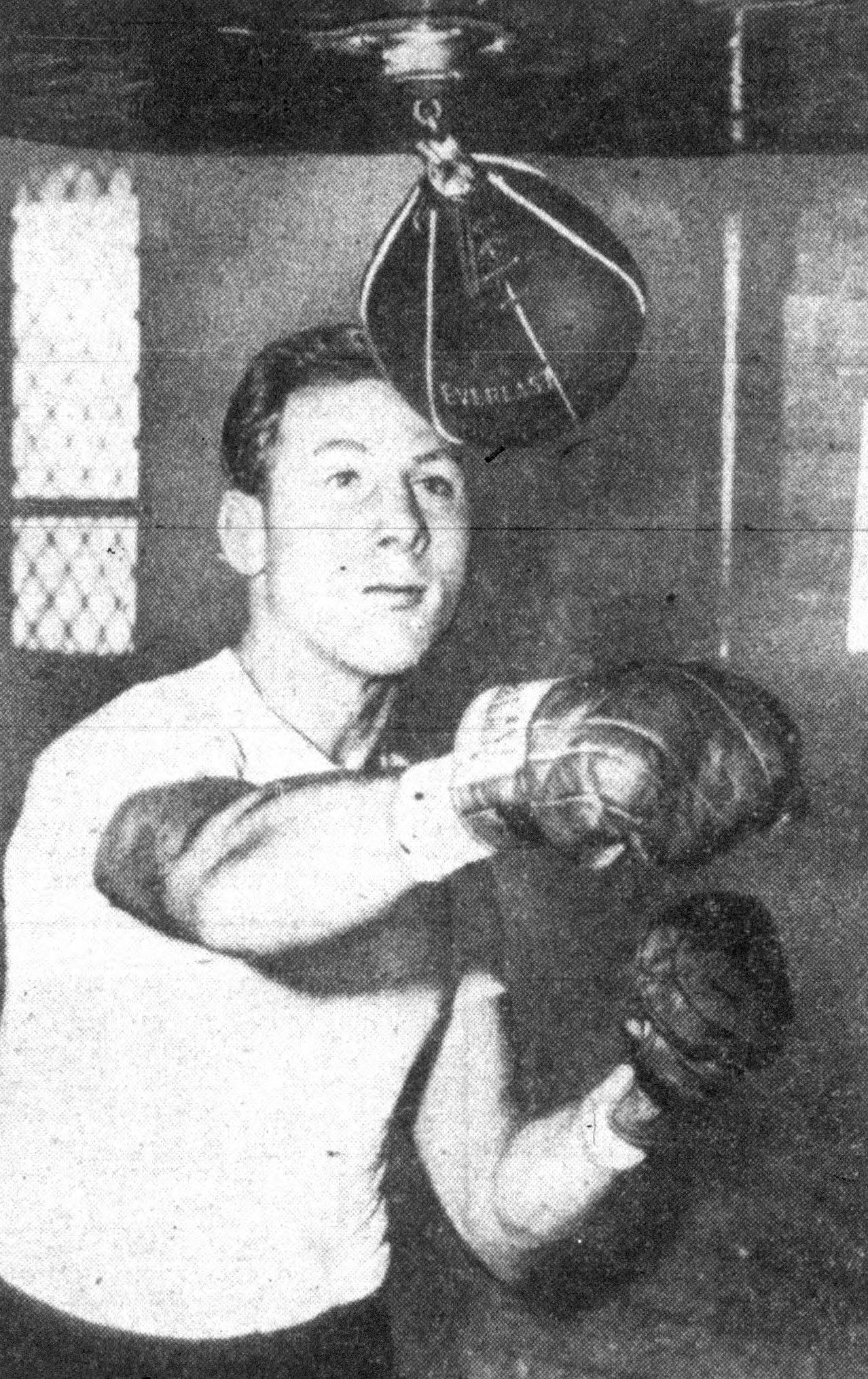
- Fusari, circa 1951

Personal information
- Nationality: American
- Born: Calogero Fusari; August 20, 1924 Alcamo, Sicily
- Died: November 1, 1985 (aged 61)
- Weight: Welterweight

Boxing career
- Stance: Orthodox

Boxing record
- Total fights: 78
- Wins: 65
- Win by KO: 38
- Losses: 12
- Draws: 1

Charley Fusari, born Calogero Fusari (August 20, 1924 – November 4, 1985), was an Italian-American boxer born in Italy.

Fusari was born in Alcamo, in the Province of Trapani, and emigrated to the United States with his family as a boy.

Charlie fought 92 bouts, 8 amateur and 84 professional bouts. He was the New Jersey State Champion in 1947, 1948 and 1949, becoming a professional boxer on May 8, 1944. He fought against notable boxers of his era such as Rocky Graziano, Tony Janiro and Sugar Ray Robinson.

Charley won his first 45 fights. In his 45th fight, he defeated Tippy Larkin. Fusari suffered from impaired hearing. With his ring earnings, he bought a milk delivery business for his family and became known as the Irvington milkman.

Fusari had two world title shots during his career. He lost a unanimous decision to defending welterweight champion Sugar Ray Robinson on August 9, 1950, and lost a split decision to Johnny Bratton for the vacant National Boxing Association World welterweight title on March 14, 1951, after Robinson vacated the title following his victory over Jake LaMotta for the world middleweight title a month earlier.

He defeated boxers such as Attilio "Rocky Castellani, Maxie Berger, Freddie Archer, Pat Demers, Al "Red" Priest, Terry Young, Joey Carkido, Jimmy Flood, Frankie Palermo, Vince Foster and Tony Pellone.

He retired from boxing in 1952.

== Sources ==
- "Record professionale di Charley Fusari". Archived from the original on November 17, 2017.
- "Charley Fusari".
- "New Jersey Boxing Hall of Fame".
- Fernandez, SR., F.Robert (2014). Boxing in New Jersey 1900–1999. Jefferson (North Carolina): Mc Farland and Co., Inc. Publishers.
