= Henry Brimm =

American boxer

Henry Brimm (January 1, 1922 – February 21, 1994) was an American boxer. Born in Santurce, Puerto Rico, his family relocated to Buffalo, New York when Brimm was 5 years old. Brimm finished his career with a 26–17–4 record. The highlight of Brimm's career occurred in 1949 when he managed a draw against Hall of Famer Sugar Ray Robinson—Robinson finished his career 173–19–2, and was 90–1–1 when he fought Brimm. Henry Brimm worked in the CC gang(404) at Bethlehem Steel Company in Lackawanna, New York.
