= Jimmy Doyle (boxer) =

American boxer (1924–1947)

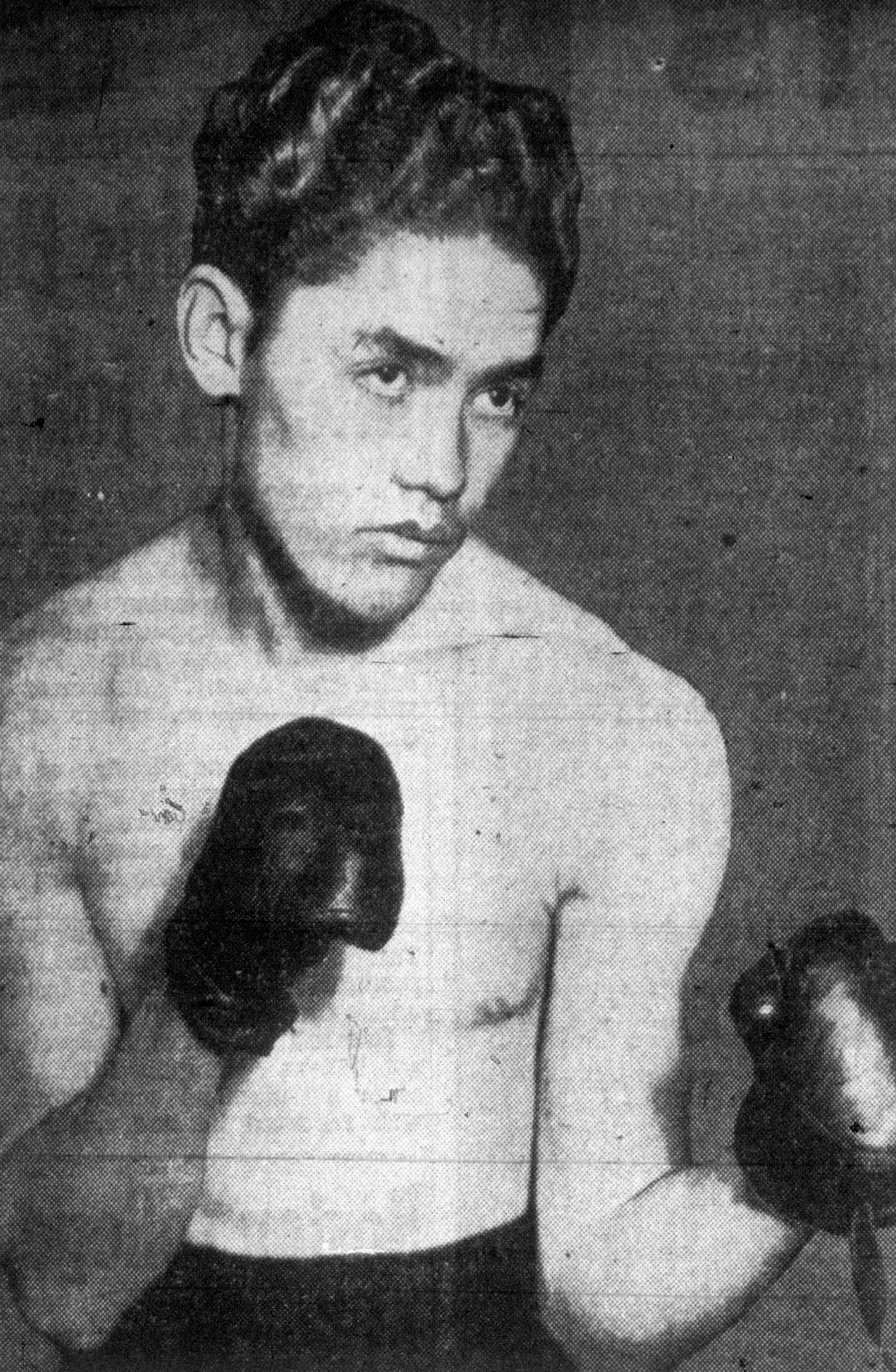
- Doyle, circa 1942

Personal information
- Born: James Emerson Delaney; August 12, 1924 Los Angeles, California, U.S.
- Died: June 25, 1947 (aged 22) Cleveland, Ohio, U.S.
- Weight: Welterweight

Boxing career
- Stance: Orthodox

Boxing record
- Total fights: 53
- Wins: 43
- Win by KO: 14
- Losses: 7
- Draws: 3

James Emerson Delaney (August 12, 1924 – June 25, 1947), known professionally as Jimmy Doyle, was a welterweight boxer who died after a boxing match with Sugar Ray Robinson.

== Early life and family ==
A mixed-race Creole, Doyle was born James Emerson Delaney in Los Angeles on August 12, 1924. "Jimmy Doyle" was the son of Edward (originally Edouard) Delaney and Marie Elodie Barret, both from New Orleans, who moved to Los Angeles shortly after they married in 1921. Jimmy's father was born in 1886 to Joseph Georges Delaney and Elodie Landry, part of a French-speaking family of colored Creoles who hailed from the upper Bayou Lafourche country.

== Professional career ==
Doyle made his debut as a professional boxer in 1941 and in 1947 lost to Sugar Ray Robinson by 8th round TKO. After the bout, Doyle went to the hospital, suffering from a severe head injury, where he died seventeen hours later.

== Last fight and death ==
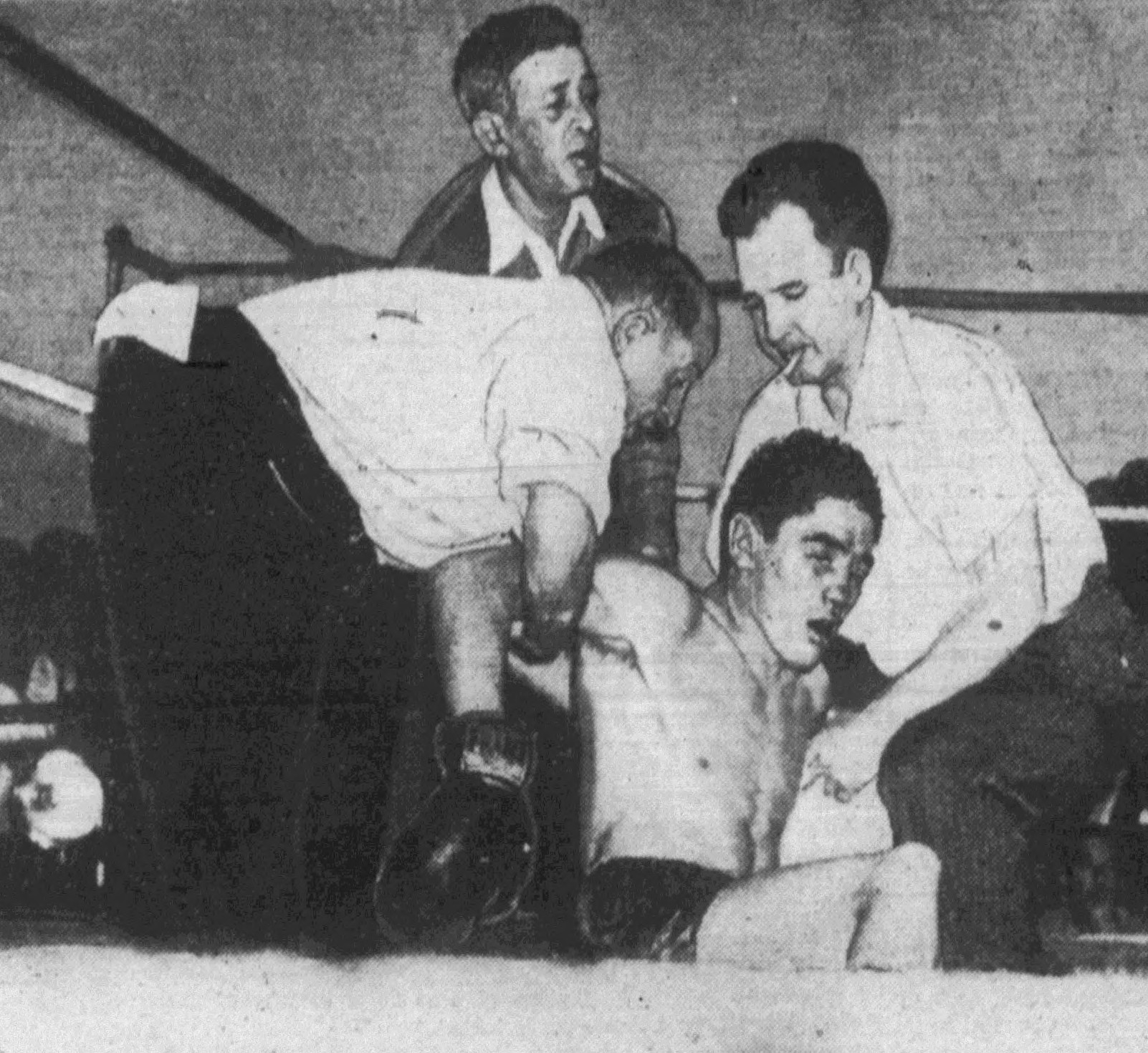
Doyle (bottom center) following his match with Sugar Ray Robinson on June 24, 1947. He died due to injuries sustained during the bout hours later at a Cleveland hospital.

In 1947, Doyle challenged Sugar Ray Robinson for the World Welterweight Title. Robinson had the advantage in every round except the sixth, when he was staggered twice and received a cut over his right eye. A single left hook from Robinson, thrown as Doyle was attempting a right hook, ended the fight in the eighth round. The punch knocked Doyle hard on to his back. As the referee started counting, Doyle raised himself onto his elbows, and tried to use the ropes to gain his feet, but he couldn't. The bell ending the round struck as the referee counted off 'nine,' saving Doyle from a complete knock out by the bell. His handlers asked the ref to end the match, as Doyle was in no condition to go on.

Doyle was taken to St. Vincent's Charity Hospital immediately after the bout, where he failed to regain consciousness and died a few hours later. He was given last rites by a Catholic priest as Robinson rushed to the hospital.

Jimmy Doyle was fighting in Cleveland, since after suffering some heavy knockouts in California that state's boxing commission would not sanction him to fight again. After his death, criminal charges were threatened against Robinson in Cleveland, up to and including manslaughter, though none actually materialized. Robinson's biographer Wil Haygood stated during a September 25, 2010 book festival appearance that Doyle was pushing himself to fight to "buy his mother a house" and after Doyle's death in 1947, Robinson gave the earnings of his next four fights to Doyle's mother, so she could buy that house. Later in an interview, Sugar Ray Robinson says he dreamt the night before the fight that he killed Doyle in the ring.
