= List of Madison Square Garden Walk of Fame Inductees =

The Madison Square Garden Walk of Fame (MSG Walk of Fame) was established in 1992 "to recognize athletes, artists, announcers and coaches for their extraordinary achievements and memorable performances at the venue." Twenty-five athletes were inducted into the MSG Walk of Fame at its inaugural ceremony in 1992, a black-tie dinner to raise money to fight multiple sclerosis.

== MSG Walk of Fame "Firsts" ==
Tennis standouts Chris Evert, Billie Jean King and Martina Navratilova were all inducted on the same day in 1993, and were the first female inductees. Other "firsts" in the MSG Walk of Fame include Elton John (1992), first entertainer; Marv Albert (1996), first sportscaster; Rolling Stones (1998), first band;. and Scott Hamilton (1998), first figure skater.

== List of Inductees ==
MSG Walk of Fame Inductees
Name		Date Inducted (yyyy-mm-dd)	Category	Ref	Comment
First	Last	Date Inducted (yyyy-mm-dd)	Category	Ref	Comment
Kareem	Abdul-Jabbar	1992-09-15	sport: basketball		
Muhammad	Ali	1992-09-15	sport: boxing		
Larry	Bird	1992-09-15	sport: basketball		
Bill	Bradley	1992-09-15	sport: basketball		
Wilt	Chamberlain	1992-09-15	sport: basketball		
Bob	Cousy	1992-09-15	sport: basketball		
Glenn	Cunningham	1992-09-15	sport: track		
Jack	Dempsey	1992-09-15	sport: boxing		
Wayne	Gretzky	1992-09-15	sport: hockey		
Nat	Holman	1992-09-15	sport: basketball, coach		
Red	Holzman	1992-09-15	sport: basketball, coach		
Gordie	Howe	1992-09-15	sport: hockey		
Michael	Jordan	1992-09-15	sport: basketball		
Joe	Lapchick	1992-09-15	sport: basketball, coach		
Rod	Laver	1992-09-15	sport: tennis		
Joe	Louis	1992-09-15	sport: boxing		
Rocky	Marciano	1992-09-15	sport: boxing		
George	Mikan	1992-09-15	sport: basketball		
Bobby	Orr	1992-09-15	sport: hockey		
Jesse	Owens	1992-09-15	sport: track		
Willis	Reed	1992-09-15	sport: basketball		
Maurice	Richard	1992-09-15	sport: hockey		
Oscar	Robertson	1992-09-15	sport: basketball		For his college career.
Sugar Ray	Robinson	1992-09-15	sport: boxing		
Bill	Russell	1992-09-15	sport: basketball		
Elton	John	1992-10-10	entertainment: music		John was the first entertainer to be inducted, for "his many memorable appearances there".
Chris	Evert	1993-08-30	sport: tennis		Evert, Martina Navratilova and Billie Jean King were the first women inducted into the MSG Walk of Fame.
Billie Jean	King	1993-08-30	sport: tennis		King, Martina Navratilova and Chris Evert were the first three women to be inducted into the MSG Walk of Fame.
Martina	Navratilova	1993-08-30	sport: tennis		Navratilova, Chris Evert and Billie Jean King were the first three women to be inducted into the MSG Walk of Fame.
Billy	Joel	1993-10-8	entertainment: music		2nd entertainer and 30th person to be inducted.
Marv	Albert	1996-10-29	sportscaster		First sportscaster inducted.
Lou	Carnesecca	1996-10-29	sport: basketball, coach		
Oscar	De La Hoya	1996-10-29	sport: boxing		
Patrick	Ewing	1996-10-29	sport: basketball		
Joe	Frazier	1996-10-29	sport: boxing		
Walt	Frazier	1996-10-29	sport: basketball		
Rod	Gilbert	1996-10-29	sport: hockey		
Steffi	Graf	1996-10-29	sport: tennis		
Jackie	Joyner-Kersee	1996-10-29	sport: track		
Carl	Lewis	1996-10-29	sport: track		
John	McEnroe	1996-10-29	sport: tennis		
Mark	Messier	1996-10-29	sport: hockey		
Dave	DeBusschere	1997-10-21	sport: basketball		
Phil	Esposito	1997-10-21	sport: hockey		
	Rolling Stones	1998-01-17	entertainment: music		First band to be inducted.
Scott	Hamilton	1998-03-14	sport: figure skating		First figure skater to be inducted.
Carol	Blazejowski	2003-09-18	sport: basketball		Inducted for scoring 52 points in a single game in 1977, before the era of 3-point baskets.
Harry	Howell	2003-09-18	sport: hockey		
Dick	McGuire	2003-09-18	sport: basketball		
Vince	McMahon	2003-09-18	sport: wrestling		
Bob	Wolff	2003-09-18	sportscaster		
George	Harrison	2006-08-01	entertainment: music		For the 35th anniversary of his ‘Concert for Bangladesh’, which raised over $15 million for UNICEF.
Teresa	Weatherspoon	2006-08-05	sport: basketball		
Harry	Gallatin	2015-05-11	sport: basketball		
Eddie	Giacomin	2015-05-11	sport: hockey		
	Grateful Dead	2015-05-11	entertainment: music		The Grateful Dead were to have been inducted in the 1990s, but the induction was postponed due to the death of the band's lead guitarist and singer, Jerry Garcia.
George	Kalinsky	2015-05-11	MSG: official photographer		
