= Edna Mae Robinson =

American actress

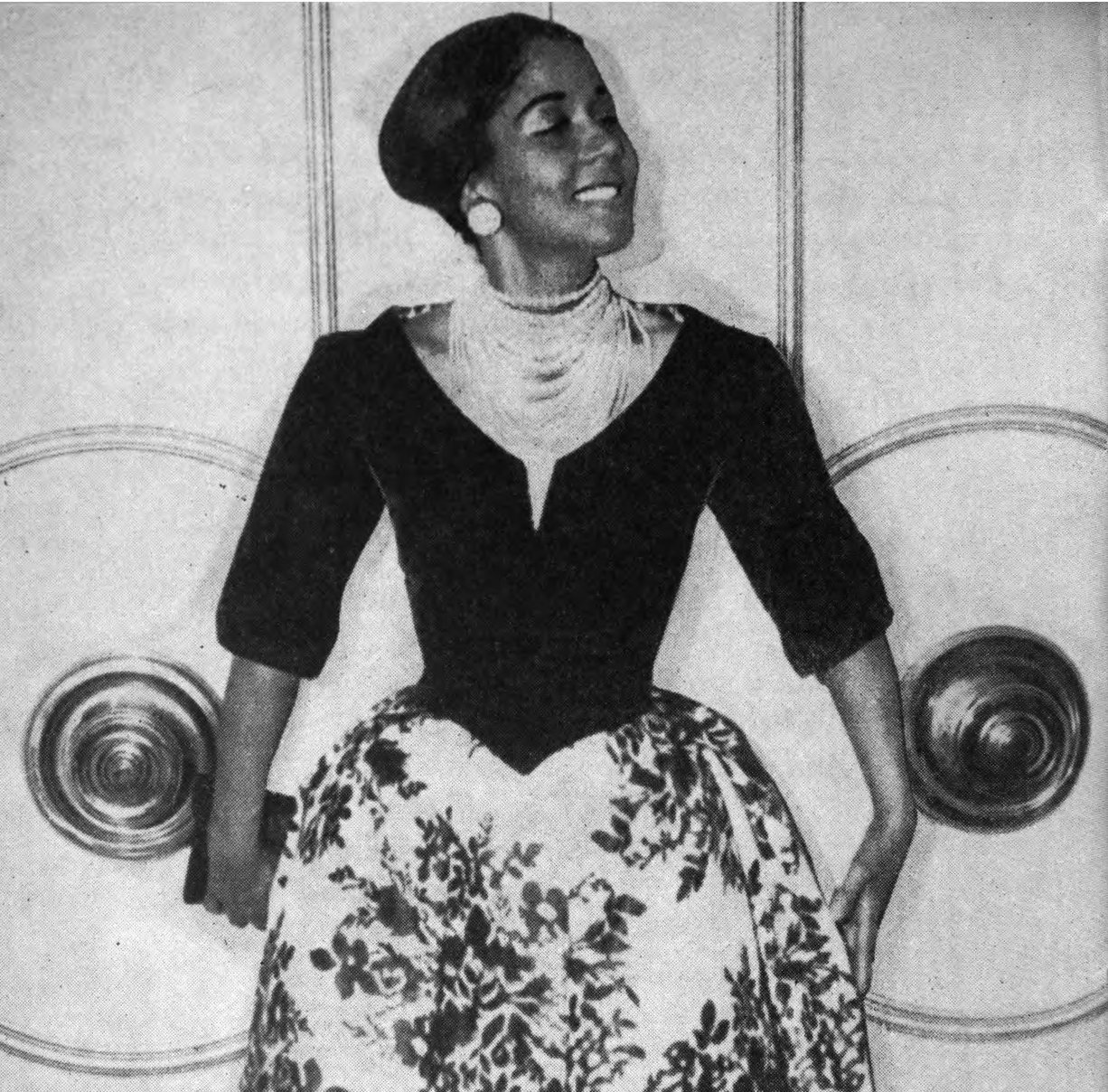
Edna Mae Robinson

Edna Mae Robinson (September 4, 1915 – May 2, 2002) was an American dancer, actress, and activist. She was a dancer at the Cotton Club and toured Europe with Duke Ellington and Cab Calloway. She later became a public figure when she married the boxer Sugar Ray Robinson, appearing on the first cover of Jet magazine in 1951. Robinson made her Broadway debut in an all-black version of Born Yesterday in 1953.

== Life and career ==
She was born Edna Mae Holly to a prominent family in Miami, Florida on September 4, 1915. Her great-grandfather was Rt. Rev. James Theodore Holly, the first black man to be consecrated an Episcopal Bishop. Robinson studied dance as a child, and after her parents died, she moved to New York to live with her aunt when she was five. She attended Hunter College and began dancing in nightclubs such as the Cotton Club and the Mimo Club. Holly was known for dancing atop an enormous drum at the Cotton Club.

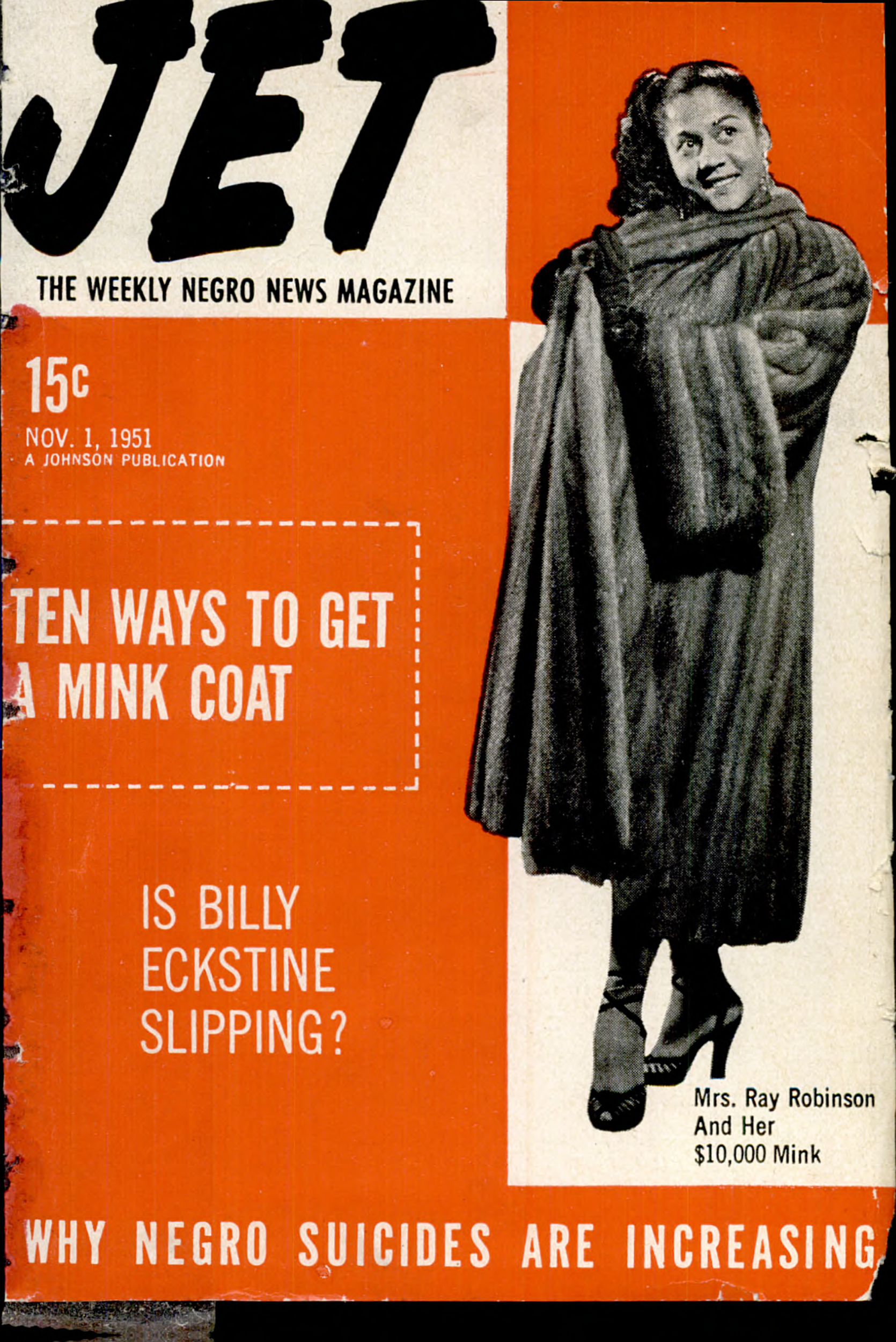
Robinson on the cover of the first issue of Jet magazine

Holly met the boxer Walker Smith Jr. in 1940, before he acquired the nicknamed Sugar Ray Robinson. She wasn't fond of him at first, because when they met at a local pool, he pushed her in and she could not swim. However, she gave him another chance, and after a long courtship, they married in 1944. During their marriage, Robinson appeared on the cover various black publications such as Jet and Ebony magazine. She appeared on the first cover of Jet magazine in 1951 wearing a $10,000 mink coat given to her by Sugar Ray for her birthday. They were a flashy couple and spent extravagantly from his boxing winnings and other ventures. In the 1950s they owned businesses including Edna Mae's Lingerie Shop and Sugar Ray's Cafe.

In 1953, Robinson made her Broadway debut in an all-black version of Born Yesterday. Despite positives reviews, the play closed after five days. She accompanied the cast on a USO tour of Japan and Europe. In 1956, she was a guest artist at Detroit producer Ziggy Johnson's annual dance school graduation party at the Latin Quarter.

After their divorce in 1962, Robinson worked as a medical assistant and then obtained a license in cosmetology. In her later years, Robinson became an exercise instructor, teaching aerobic classes for senior citizens. She was a technical consultant during the making of Francis Ford Coppla's 1984 film The Cotton Club.

Robinson was active in Martin Luther King Jr.'s Southern Christian Leadership Conference, the NAACP, and she supported several charities. When Robinson resided in Riverdale in the early 1960s, she was chairman of Intergroup, an organization working for housing integration.

After Sugar Ray's' death in 1989, Robinson reflected on their turbulent marriage by putting her painful memories into a manuscript. She was planning to release a memoir.

Robinson died at the age of 86 on May 2, 2002 from complications of Alzheimer's disease in New York. She was survived by her son and five grandchildren.

== Personal life ==
She married Sugar Ray Robinson on May 29, 1944. They had difficulty having children during their tumultuous marriage. Robinson had four miscarriages before the birth of their son, Ray Robinson Jr. (born 1949). Despite her husband’s extramarital affairs, Robinson was present in support and often seen ringside during his fights. They separated in 1960 and obtained a divorce in 1962.

In 1969, Sugar Ray tried to declare their marriage void on the grounds that her divorce from a previous husband was fraudulent; his case was dismissed. Their separation agreement provided her with $200 a week, fringe benefits and a percentage of any annual income over $60,000. In 1989, Robinson stated her divorce settlement amounted to a little more than $23,000 due to Sugar Ray's bad investments and issues with the IRS.
