= George Costner =

American boxer

George Monroe "Sugar" Costner (July 22, 1923 – October 29, 2002) was an American professional boxer. Costner was a major welterweight contender from 1944 to 1950.

== Early life ==
Costner was born at Mount Auburn, Cincinnati, Ohio. He wanted to be a baseball player, until realizing he couldn't play in the major leagues as a black man. Whilst working as driver of a city sanitation truck in the morning, he trained in boxing each afternoon at a gym on Pleasant Street. He became a professional boxer aged 15, winning his first fight two years later with a second-round K.O.

== Boxing career ==
In 1950, Costner fought Sugar Ray Robinson for the second time, having been knocked out by Robinson at 2:55 of the first round on February 14, 1945. Costner, by the time of their second bout had taken to calling himself "Sugar" and stated in the weeks leading up to the fight that he was the rightful deserver of the name. However, Robinson, who is widely considered one of the greatest fighters in history disagreed. "We better touch gloves, because this is the only round", Robinson said as the fighters were introduced at the center of the ring. "Your name ain't Sugar, mine is". Robinson then knocked Costner out in 2 minutes and 49 seconds. Afterward, Robinson reportedly told Costner, "[n]ow go out and earn yourself the name." In his next fight, Costner fought Kid Gavilán, a future International Boxing Hall of Famer, and won in a controversial 10-round decision. After two more fights, including a 10-round, unanimous decision over future Hall of Famer Ike Williams, Costner retired in 1950 with a 73–11–4 record.

== Later life ==
After retiring due to vision problems- suffering from a detached retina in his right eye, and eventually losing vision in both eyes- Costner underwent six unsuccessful operations between 1951 and 1958. He was unable to find work, and became homeless, but in 1951 became a shipping clerk. Over the decade from 1958 to 1968, Costner "didn't do much but take low-wage jobs and leave them", and "subsisted on a military pension, social security, and the notion that nobody has much use for a blind man." At the encouragement of friends, he studied for a GED, then, with a 3.7 grade-point average, took an AA degree from Cuyahoga State College, in Cleveland, Ohio. In his fifties, he enrolled at Cleveland State University, where he "taped all his lectures" and "got all his books on tape from the Sight Center in Cleveland"; he graduated with a BA in Business Administration in 1979. As he told the Ring magazine in 1983, "I was fifty and I was never a loser by nature, so I simply made up my mind that George Costner could still be somebody." He went on to work for the Ohio Civil Rights Commission as an intake specialist, retiring in 1985 to his apartment "off Gilbert Avenue, listening to scratchy jazz on the radio". He died October 26, 2002 at the Harmony Court Nursing Home in Roselawn, Cincinnati, survived by two sons, a daughter, and several grandchildren.
