= Robert Villemain =

French boxer

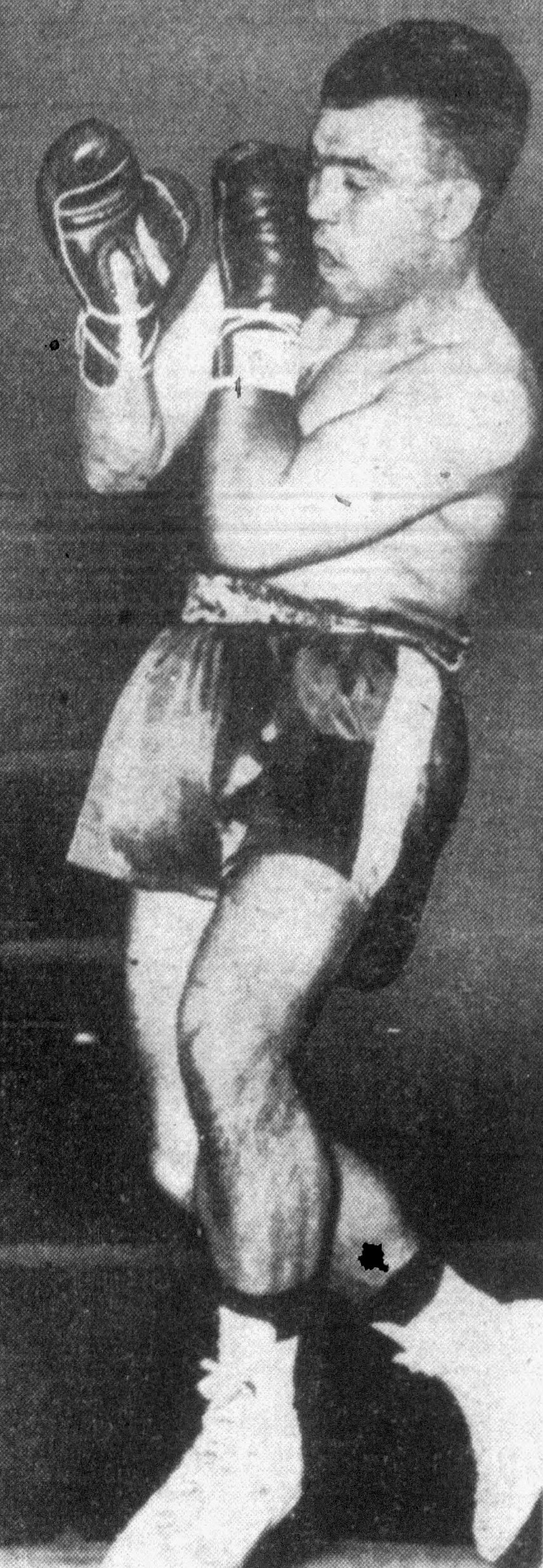
Villemain in 1950

Robert Villemain (January 10, 1924 in Paris, France - September 4, 1984 in Montfermeil, France ) was a French boxer. Villemain defeated Hall of Famers Kid Gavilán and Jake LaMotta during his career. He lost his Pennsylvania middleweight title to Sugar Ray Robinson in 1950.
