= Bob and weave =

Boxing defensive technique

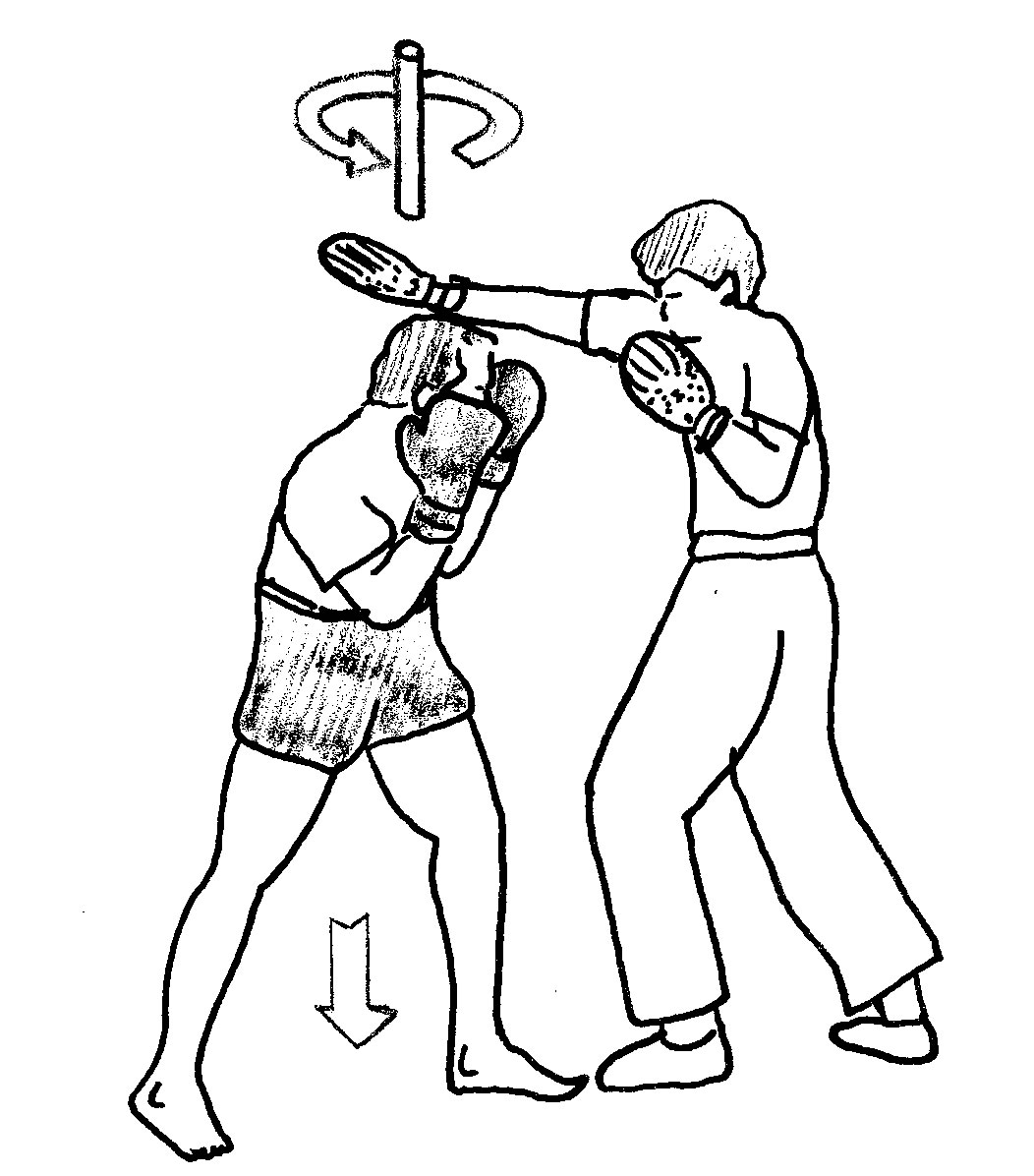
Bob and weave

In boxing, bobbing and weaving is a defensive technique that moves the head both beneath and laterally of an incoming punch. As the opponent's punch arrives, the fighter bends the legs quickly and simultaneously shifts the body either slightly right or left. Fighters generally begin weaving to the left, as most opponents are orthodox stance, and therefore strike with a left jab first. Common mistakes made with this move include bending at the waist, bending too low, moving in the same direction as the incoming punch, and squaring up. To be able to bob and weave, the boxer would need good reflexes to accurately see the punches coming.

== Notable bob and weave boxers ==
- Jack Dempsey
- Joe Frazier
- Bennie Briscoe
- Rocky Graziano
- Rocky Marciano
- Floyd Mayweather Jr.
- Archie Moore
- Floyd Patterson
- Aaron Pryor
- Salvador Sánchez
- James Toney
- José Torres
- David Tua
- Mike Tyson
- Naseem Hamed

== See also ==
- Slipping
