= 53rd Academy Awards =

- Official poster with original date
- Date: March 31, 1981
- Site: Dorothy Chandler Pavilion; Los Angeles, California, U.S.
- Hosted by: Johnny Carson
- Produced by: Norman Jewison
- Directed by: Marty Pasetta

Highlights
- Best Picture: Ordinary People
- Most awards: Ordinary People (4)
- Most nominations: The Elephant Man and Raging Bull (8)

TV in the United States
- Network: ABC
- Duration: 3 hours, 10 minutes
- Ratings: 39.9 million 31% (Nielsen ratings)

The 53rd Academy Awards ceremony, organized by the Academy of Motion Picture Arts and Sciences (AMPAS), honored films released in 1980 and took place on March 31, 1981, at the Dorothy Chandler Pavilion in Los Angeles, beginning at 7:00 p.m. PST / 10:00 p.m. EST. The ceremony was scheduled to take place originally on the previous day but was postponed due to the attempted assassination of Ronald Reagan. During the ceremony, AMPAS presented Academy Awards (commonly referred to as Oscars) in 20 categories. The ceremony, televised in the United States by ABC, was produced by Norman Jewison and directed by Marty Pasetta. Comedian and talk show host Johnny Carson hosted the show for the third consecutive time. Two weeks earlier, in a ceremony held at The Beverly Hilton in Beverly Hills, California, on March 15, the Academy Scientific and Technical Awards were presented by hosts Ed Asner and Fay Kanin.

Ordinary People won four awards, including Best Picture. Other winners included Tess with three awards, The Empire Strikes Back, Fame, Melvin and Howard, and Raging Bull with two, and Coal Miner's Daughter, The Dollar Bottom, The Fly, From Mao to Mozart: Isaac Stern in China, Karl Hess: Toward Liberty, and Moscow Does Not Believe in Tears with one. The telecast garnered 39.9 million viewers in the United States.

== Winners and nominees ==
The nominees for the 53rd Academy Awards were announced on February 17, 1981, by Academy president Fay Kanin and actor William Devane. The Elephant Man and Raging Bull tied for the most nominations with eight each. The winners were announced at the awards ceremony on March 31. Best Director winner Robert Redford became the third individual to win this category for his directing debut and the first actor to achieve this feat. At age 20, Best Supporting Actor winner Timothy Hutton was the youngest male acting winner in Oscar history. Fame became the first film to earn two nominations for Best Original Song.

=== Awards ===
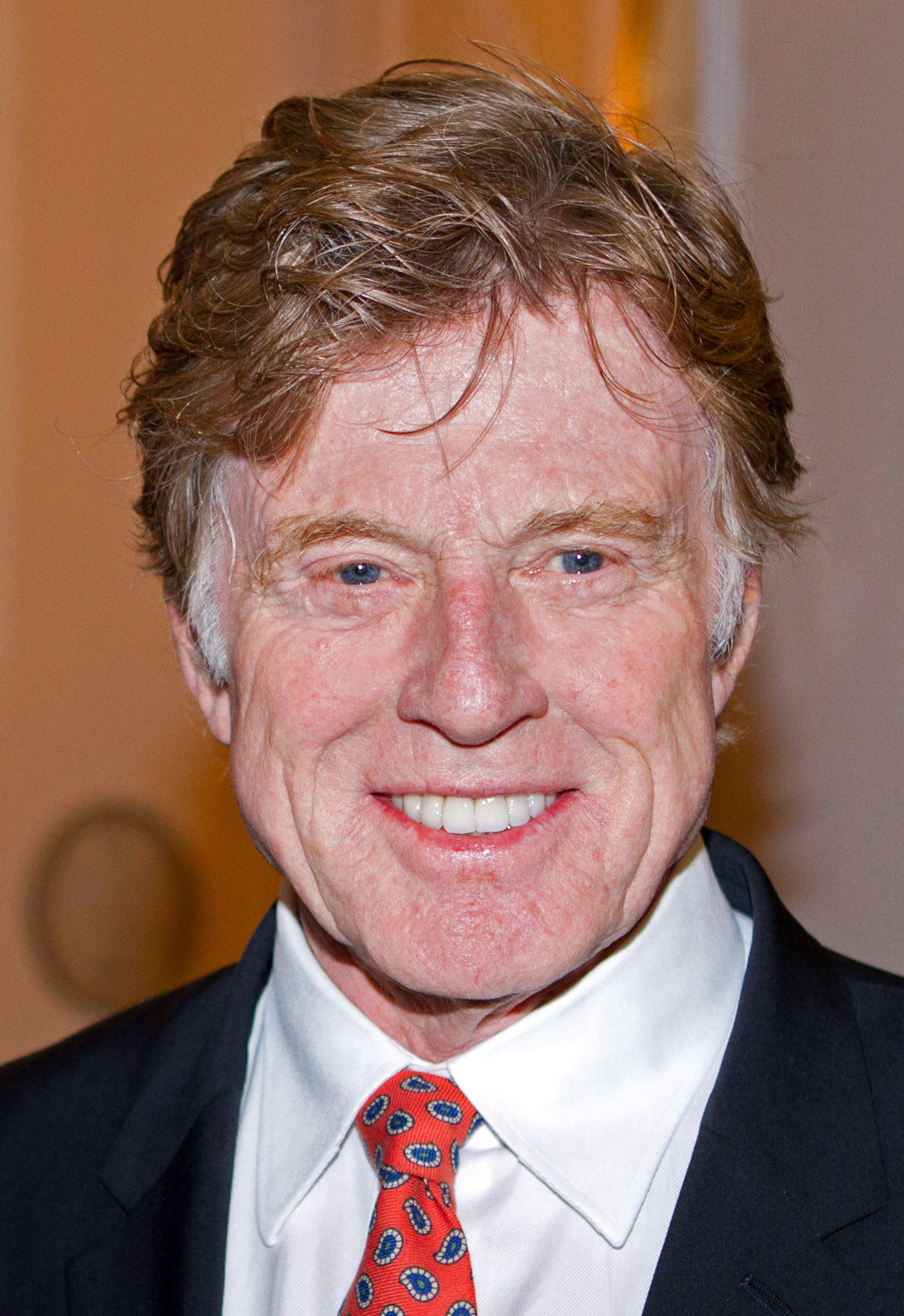
Robert Redford, Best Director winner

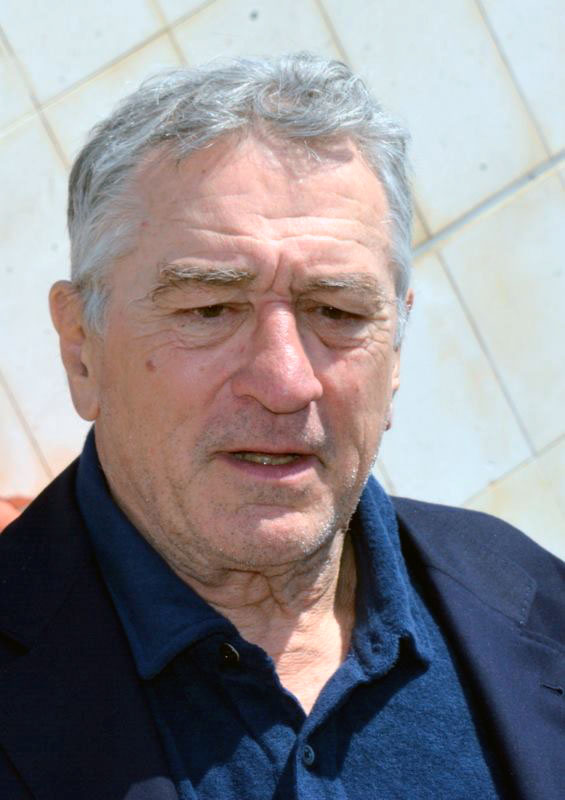
Robert De Niro, Best Actor winner

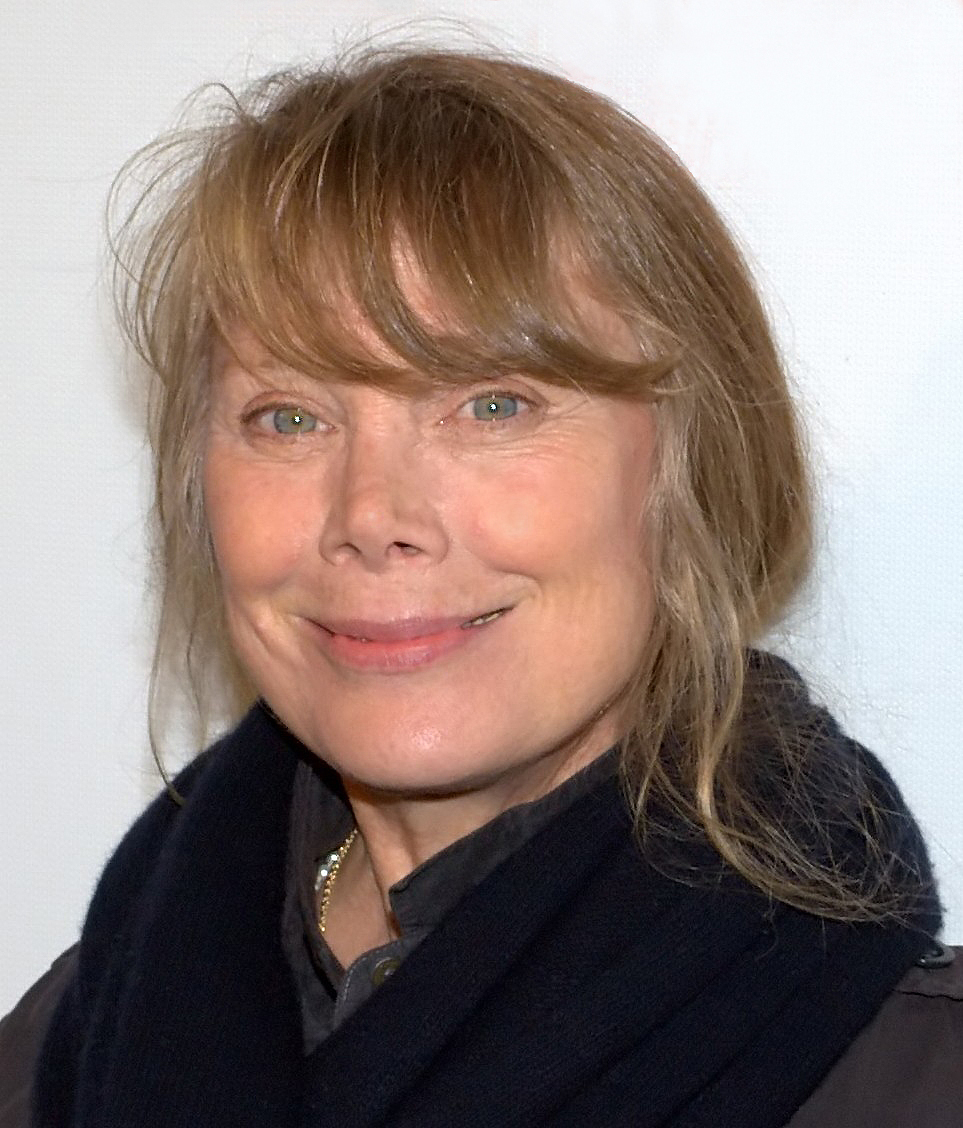
Sissy Spacek, Best Actress winner

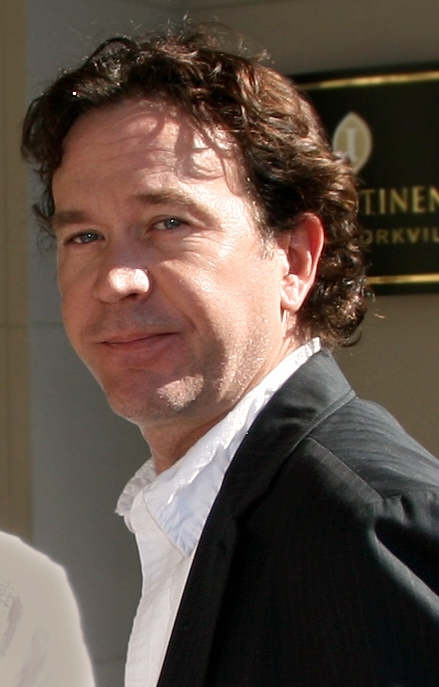
Timothy Hutton, Best Supporting Actor winner

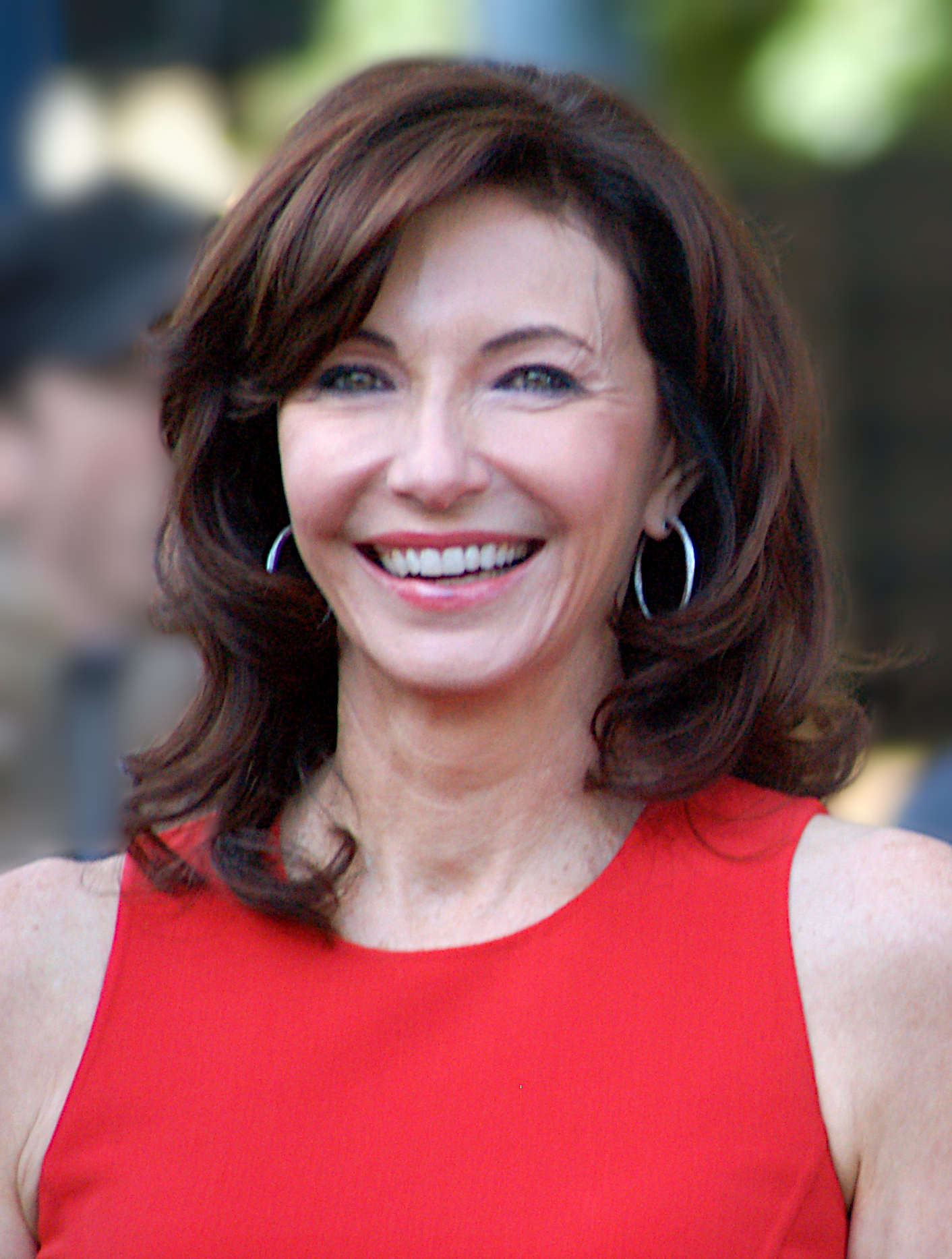
Mary Steenburgen, Best Supporting Actress winner

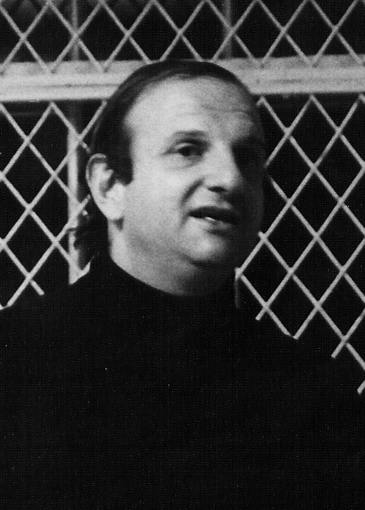
Bo Goldman, Best Screenplay Written Directly for the Screen winner

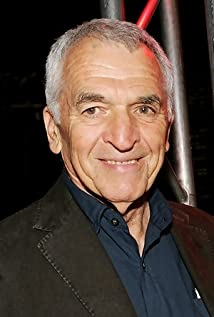
Alvin Sargent, Best Screenplay Based on Material from Another Medium winner

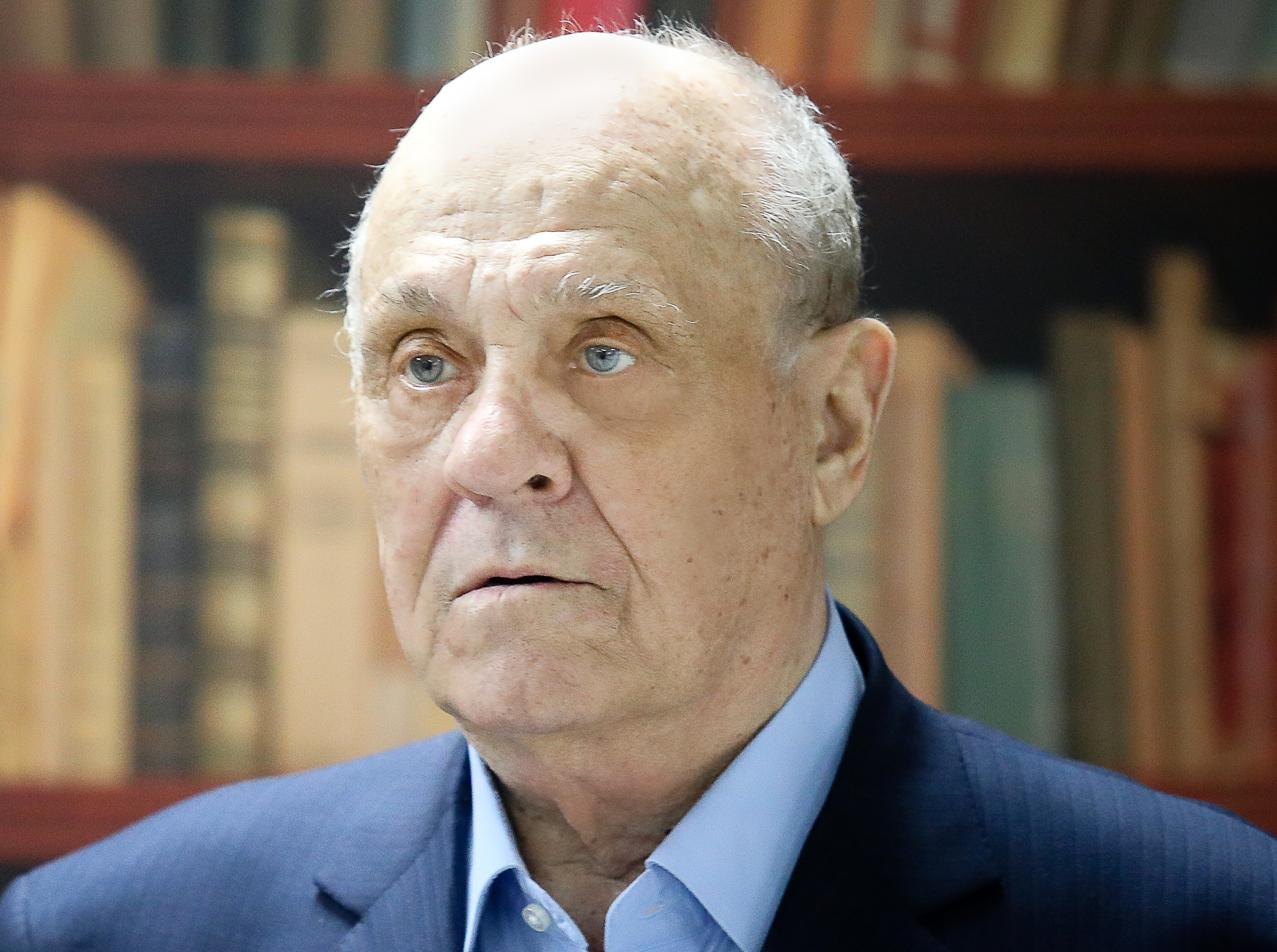
Vladimir Menshov, Best Foreign Language Film winner

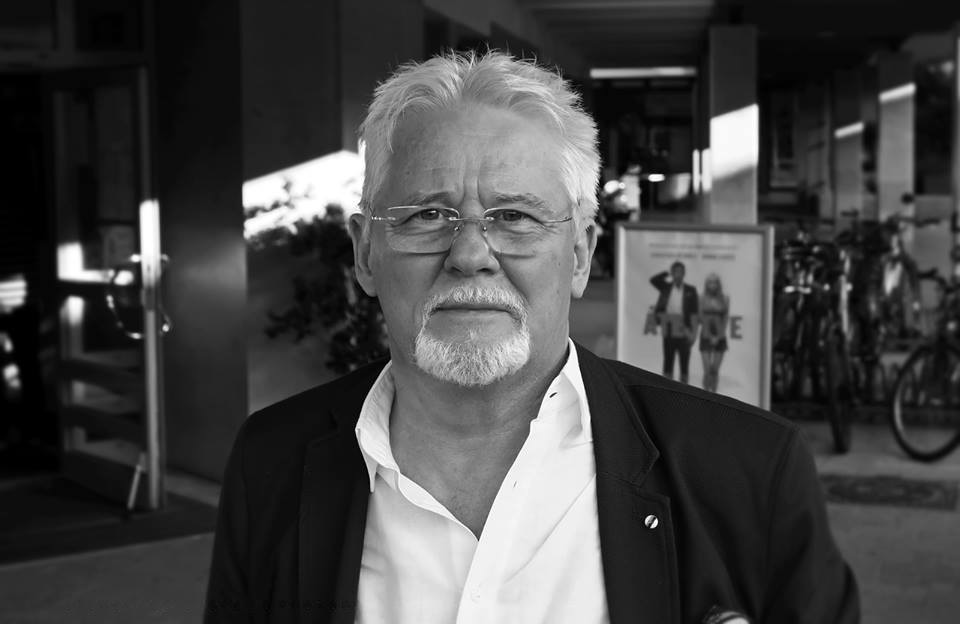
Ferenc Rofusz, Best Animated Short Film winner

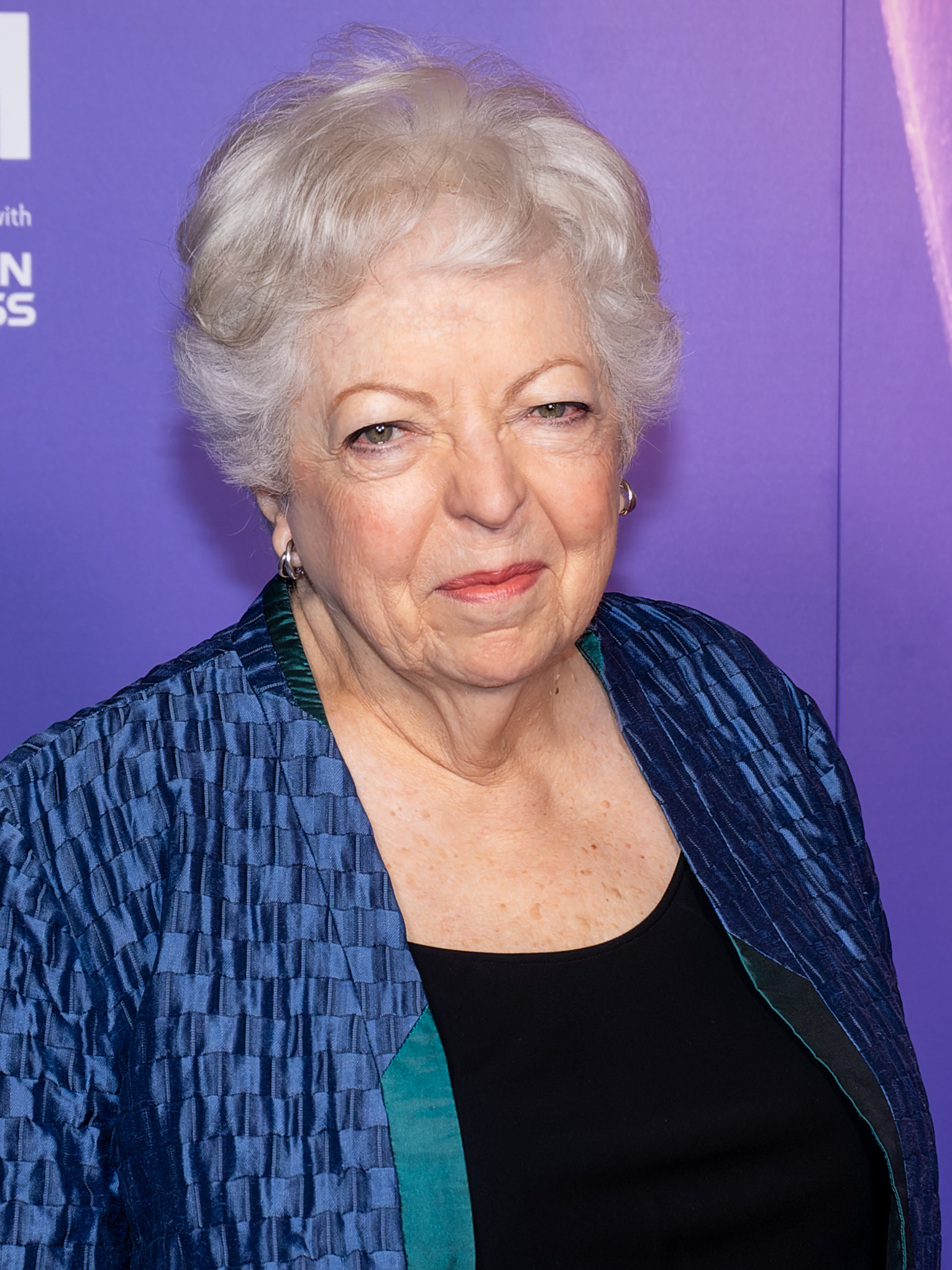
Thelma Schoonmaker, Best Film Editing winner

Winners are listed first, highlighted in boldface and indicated with a double dagger (‡).

Table featuring winners and nominees of the 53rd Academy Awards
**Best Picture**: **Ordinary People – Ronald L. Schwary, producer**‡; Coal Miner's Daughter – Bernard Schwartz, producer; The Elephant Man – Jonathan Sanger, producer; Raging Bull – Robert Chartoff and Irwin Winkler, producers; Tess – Claude Berri, producer; Timothy Burrill, co-producer	**Best Directing**: **Robert Redford – Ordinary People**‡; David Lynch – The Elephant Man; Martin Scorsese – Raging Bull; Richard Rush – The Stunt Man; Roman Polanski – Tess
**Best Actor in a Leading Role**: **Robert De Niro – Raging Bull as Jake LaMotta**‡; Robert Duvall – The Great Santini as Lt. Col. Wilbur "Bull" Meechum; John Hurt – The Elephant Man as Joseph Merrick; Jack Lemmon – Tribute as Scottie Templeton; Peter O'Toole – The Stunt Man as Eli Cross	**Best Actress in a Leading Role**: **Sissy Spacek – Coal Miner's Daughter as Loretta Lynn**‡; Ellen Burstyn – Resurrection as Edna Mae McCauley; Goldie Hawn – Private Benjamin as Judy Benjamin; Mary Tyler Moore – Ordinary People as Beth Jarrett; Gena Rowlands – Gloria as Gloria Swenson
**Best Actor in a Supporting Role**: **Timothy Hutton – Ordinary People as Conrad Jarrett**‡; Judd Hirsch – Ordinary People as Dr. Tyrone C. Berger; Michael O'Keefe – The Great Santini as Ben; Joe Pesci – Raging Bull as Joey LaMotta; Jason Robards – Melvin and Howard as Howard Hughes	**Best Actress in a Supporting Role**: **Mary Steenburgen – Melvin and Howard as Lynda West Dummar**‡; Eileen Brennan – Private Benjamin as Doreen Lewis; Eva Le Gallienne – Resurrection as Pearl; Cathy Moriarty – Raging Bull as Vikki Thailer LaMotta; Diana Scarwid – Inside Moves as Louise
**Best Writing (Screenplay Written Directly for the Screen)**: **Melvin and Howard – Bo Goldman**‡; Brubaker – Screenplay by W. D. Richter; Story by W. D. Richter and Arthur A. Ross; Fame – Christopher Gore; Mon Oncle D'Amerique – Jean Gruault; Private Benjamin – Nancy Meyers, Charles Shyer and Harvey Miller	**Best Writing (Screenplay Based on Material from Another Medium)**: **Ordinary People – Alvin Sargent based on the novel by Judith Guest**‡; Breaker Morant – Jonathan Hardy, David Stevens and Bruce Beresford based on the play by Kenneth G. Ross; Coal Miner's Daughter – Thomas Rickman based on the autobiography by Loretta Lynn with George Vecsey; The Elephant Man – Christopher De Vore, Eric Bergren and David Lynch based on the books The Elephant Man and Other Reminiscences by Sir Frederick Treves and The Elephant Man: A Study in Human Dignity by Ashley Montagu; The Stunt Man – Screenplay by Lawrence B. Marcus; Adaptation by Richard Rush based on the novel by Paul Brodeur
**Best Foreign Language Film**: **Moscow Does Not Believe in Tears (Soviet Union) in Russian – directed by Vladimir Menshov**‡; Confidence (Hungary) in Hungarian – directed by István Szabó; Kagemusha (Japan) in Japanese – directed by Akira Kurosawa; The Last Metro (France) in French – directed by François Truffaut; The Nest (Spain) in Spanish – directed by Jaime de Armiñán	**Best Documentary (Feature)**: **From Mao to Mozart: Isaac Stern in China – Murray Lerner**‡; Agee – Ross Spears; The Day After Trinity – Jon H. Else; Front Line – David Bradbury; The Yellow Star: The Persecution of the Jews in Europe 1933–45 – Bengt von zur Muehlen and Arthur Cohn
**Best Documentary (Short Subject)**: **Karl Hess: Toward Liberty – Roland Hallé and Peter Ladue**‡; Don't Mess with Bill – John Watson and Pen Densham; The Eruption of Mount St. Helens! – George Casey; It's the Same World – Dick Young; Luther Metke at 94 – Richard Hawkins and Jorge Preloran	**Best Short Film (Dramatic Live Action)**: **The Dollar Bottom – Lloyd Phillips**‡; Fall Line – Bob Carmichael and Greg Lowe; A Jury of Her Peers – Sally Heckel
**Best Short Film (Animated)**: **The Fly – Ferenc Rofusz**‡; All Nothing – Frédéric Back; History of the World in Three Minutes Flat – Michael Mills	**Best Music (Original Score)**: **Fame – Michael Gore**‡; Altered States – John Corigliano; The Elephant Man – John Morris; The Empire Strikes Back – John Williams; Tess – Philippe Sarde
**Best Music (Original Song)**: **"Fame" from Fame – Music by Michael Gore; Lyrics by Dean Pitchford**‡; "9 to 5" from 9 to 5 – Music and Lyrics by Dolly Parton; "On the Road Again" from Honeysuckle Rose – Music and Lyrics by Willie Nelson; "Out Here on My Own" from Fame – Music by Michael Gore; Lyrics by Lesley Gore; "People Alone" from The Competition – Music by Lalo Schifrin; Lyrics by Will Jennings	**Best Sound**: **The Empire Strikes Back – Bill Varney, Steve Maslow, Gregg Landaker and Peter Sutton**‡; Altered States – Arthur Piantadosi, Les Fresholtz, Michael Minkler and Willie D. Burton; Coal Miner's Daughter – Richard Portman, Roger Heman and Jim Alexander; Fame – Michael J. Kohut, Aaron Rochin, Jay M. Harding and Chris Newman; Raging Bull – Donald O. Mitchell, Bill Nicholson, David J. Kimball and Les Lazarowitz
**Best Art Direction**: **Tess – Art Direction and Set Decoration: Pierre Guffroy and Jack Stephens**‡; Coal Miner's Daughter – Art Direction: John W. Corso; Set Decoration: John M. Dwyer; The Elephant Man – Art Direction: Stuart Craig and Robert Cartwright; Set Decoration: Hugh Scaife; The Empire Strikes Back – Art Direction: Norman Reynolds, Leslie Dilley, Harry Lange and Alan Tomkins; Set Decoration: Michael Ford; Kagemusha – Art Direction and Set Decoration: Yoshirō Muraki	**Best Cinematography**: **Tess – Geoffrey Unsworth and Ghislain Cloquet**‡; The Blue Lagoon – Néstor Almendros; Coal Miner's Daughter – Ralf D. Bode; The Formula – James Crabe; Raging Bull – Michael Chapman
**Best Costume Design**: **Tess – Anthony Powell**‡; The Elephant Man – Patricia Norris; My Brilliant Career – Anna Senior; Somewhere in Time – Jean-Pierre Dorleac; When Time Ran Out – Paul Zastupnevich	**Best Film Editing**: **Raging Bull – Thelma Schoonmaker**‡; Coal Miner's Daughter – Arthur Schmidt; The Competition – David Blewitt; The Elephant Man – Anne V. Coates; Fame – Gerry Hambling

=== Special Achievement Award (Visual Effects) ===
- The Empire Strikes Back – Brian Johnson, Richard Edlund, Dennis Muren and Bruce Nicholson.

=== Honorary Award ===
- To Henry Fonda, the consummate actor, in recognition of his brilliant accomplishments and enduring contribution to the art of motion pictures.

=== Multiple nominations and awards ===
Films with multiple nominations
Nominations	Film
8	The Elephant Man
8	Raging Bull
7	Coal Miner's Daughter
6	Fame
6	Ordinary People
6	Tess
3	The Empire Strikes Back (Note: Not counting the non-competitive Special Achievement Award for The Empire Strikes Back.)
3	Melvin and Howard
3	Private Benjamin
3	The Stunt Man
2	Altered States
2	The Competition
2	The Great Santini
2	Kagemusha
2	Resurrection

Films with multiple wins
Wins	Film
4	Ordinary People
3	Tess
2	Fame
2	Melvin and Howard
2	Raging Bull

== Presenters and performers ==
The following individuals, listed in order of appearance, presented awards or performed musical numbers:

=== Presenters ===
Table featuring presenters for the 53rd Academy Awards
Name(s)	Role
Hank Simms	Announcer of the 53rd Academy Awards
Ronald Reagan (pre-recorded)	Gave opening remarks welcoming guests to the awards ceremony
Jack Lemmon; Mary Tyler Moore	Presenters of the award for Best Supporting Actor
Alan Arkin; Margot Kidder	Presenters of the awards for Best Animated Short Film and Best Live Action Short Film
Richard Chamberlain; Lesley-Anne Down	Presenters of the Documentary Short Subject and Best Documentary Feature
Peter O'Toole; Sissy Spacek	Presenters of the award for Best Art Direction
Nastassja Kinski; Sigourney Weaver	Presenters of the award for Best Costume Design
Jack Valenti	Presenter of the award for Best Visual Effects
Bernadette Peters; Billy Dee Williams	Presenters of the award for Best Sound
Brooke Shields; Franco Zeffirelli	Presenters of the award for Best Foreign Language Film
Fayard Nicholas; Harold Nicholas	Presenters of the award for Best Original Score
Richard Pryor; Jane Seymour	Presenters of the award for Best Film Editing
Diana Ross; Donald Sutherland	Presenters of the award for Best Supporting Actress
Angie Dickinson; Luciano Pavarotti	Presenters of the award for Best Original Song
Peter Ustinov	Presenters of the awards for Best Screenplay Based on Material from Another Medium and Best Screenplay Written Directly for the Screen
Robert Redford	Presenter of the Honorary Award to Henry Fonda
Blythe Danner; Steve Martin	Presenters of the award for Best Cinematography
George Cukor; King Vidor	Presenters of the award for Best Director
Sally Field	Presenter of the award for Best Actor
Dustin Hoffman	Presenter of the award for Best Actress
Lillian Gish	Presenter of the award for Best Picture

=== Performers ===
Table featuring performers for the 53rd Academy Awards
Name	Role	Performed
Henry Mancini	Musical arranger Conductor	Orchestral
Lucie Arnaz	Performer	"Hooray for Hollywood"
Willie Nelson	Performer	"On the Road Again" from Honeysuckle Rose
Irene Cara	Performer	"Fame" and "Out Here On My Own" from Fame
Dolly Parton	Performer	"9 to 5" from Nine to Five
Dionne Warwick	Performer	"People Alone" from The Competition
Academy Awards Orchestra	Performers	"Hooray for Hollywood(reprise)" (orchestral) during the closing credits

== Ceremony information ==
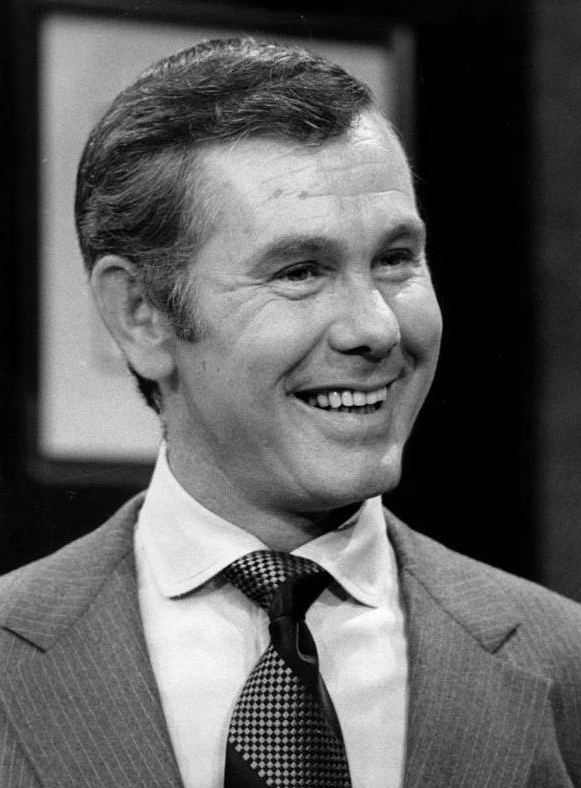
Johnny Carson hosted the 53rd Academy Awards.

In December 1980, the Academy hired film producer Norman Jewison to produce the telecast for the first time. "I am delighted that the Academy will have the benefit of Norman Jewison's insight and creativity," said AMPAS President Fay Kanin in a press release announcing the selection. "He has always been able to bring a fresh approach into his work." That same month, it was announced that comedian and The Tonight Show host Johnny Carson would preside over emceeing duties for the 1981 ceremony. Jewison explained the decision to hire Carson, saying that the host was "an entertainment institution whose spontaneous wit and charm would add a great deal to the quality of the show."

Originally, the gala was scheduled to take place on March 30. However, due to the attempted assassination on US president Ronald Reagan which occurred earlier that day, Kanin, Jewison, and executives from broadcaster ABC announced that the festivities would be postponed to the following day. It marked the first time since the 40th ceremony held in 1968 that the ceremony was postponed from its original date. Furthermore, producers debated whether or not to televise a pre-recorded speech from Reagan, who was a former actor, saluting the nominees and the Academy. The segment, which was filmed nearly four weeks prior to the show, was eventually broadcast, with host Carson giving a preface explaining the decision to postpone the event.

=== The Fly acceptance speech ===
During the presentation of the award for Best Animated Short Film to The Fly, presenters Alan Arkin and Margot Kidder announced that the film's director, Ferenc Rofusz was unable to attend the ceremony. Just as they announced the Academy would accept the award on his behalf, an unnamed man later identified as Hungarofilm general manager Istvan Dosai came up on stage and accepted the award in lieu of the absent filmmaker. Marble Arch Films publicist Regina Gruss, who was in charge of hosting the Hungarian delegation at the Oscars, said that Rofusz contacted Dosai to accept the award on his behalf, but Academy officials asked him not to come up onstage unless his name was announced. After speaking to reporters and posing for pictures backstage, he never returned to his seat and left the ceremony immediately. According to Academy security chief Jerry Moon, AMPAS contacted the LAPD to issue a search warrant for Dosai for theft. However, Academy spokesperson Art Sarno denied that the organization had contacted the police and said that Dosai returned the statuette during a post-awards banquet.

=== Critical reviews ===
Some media outlets received the broadcast critically. Television columnist Tom Shales of The Washington Post commented, "Everything seemed an anticlimax to the Reagan opening, and the tragic events in Washington a day earlier did put a shadow of gloom over an affair that had promised to be grim enough anyway – since all but one of the year's Best Picture nominees were somber, austere films, and nothing to shout about." The Salt Lake Tribune television critic Harold Schindler wrote, "On the whole, the 53rd annual Academy Awards telecast Tuesday was overly long, expectedly dull and surprisingly lacking in those highlights which make Oscar night conversation." Bill Mandel of the San Francisco Examiner quipped, "After the real and completely unscripted emotional explosions of Monday, all the manipulated thrills of the movie industry seemed like the efforts of those bullfight clowns who distract the bull when the matador is injured."

Other media outlets received the broadcast more positively. Tampa Bay Times film critic Robert Alan Ross remarked, "The one-day delay turned out well. President Reagan's taped greeting – combined with emcee Johnny Carson's assurance that the First Couple were comfortably watching – instilled a happier mood than might otherwise have prevailed." Jerry Buck of the Associated Press quipped, "Producer Norman Jewison effectively chose to make the night a homage to motion pictures' past, making wide use of many cherished film clips that tugged at the heart and memory." The Boston Globe columnist Bruce McCabe wrote, "Given the trauma of the past few days, the Academy Awards show conducted itself rather well. No one really disgraced himself. There were no political speeches."

=== Ratings and reception ===
The American telecast on ABC drew in an average of 39.9 million people over the length of the entire ceremony, which was a 19% decrease from the previous year's ceremony. An estimated 75 million total viewers watched all or part of the awards. Moreover, the show drew lower Nielsen ratings compared to the previous ceremony, with 31% of households watching over a 58% share. Nevertheless, the ceremony presentation won an award for Outstanding Art Direction for a Variety Program (Roy Christopher) at the 33rd Primetime Emmys in September 1981.

== See also ==
- List of submissions to the 53rd Academy Awards for Best Foreign Language Film

== Bibliography ==
- Franks, Don (2005), Entertainment Awards: A Music, Cinema, Theatre and Broadcasting Guide, 1928 through 2003 (3rd ed.), Jefferson, North Carolina, United States: McFarland & Company, ISBN 978-1-5791-2396-3
- Holden, Anthony (1993), Behind the Oscar: The Secret History of the Academy Awards, New York, New York, United States: Simon & Schuster, ISBN 978-0-6717-0129-1
- Kinn, Gail; Piazza, Jim (2002), The Academy Awards: The Complete Unofficial History, New York, New York, United States: Workman Publishing Company, ISBN 978-1-5791-2396-3
- Osborne, Robert (2013). 85 Years of the Oscar: The Complete History of the Academy Awards. New York, New York, United States: Abbeville Publishing Group. ISBN 978-0-7892-1142-2. OCLC 856879222.
- Sackett, Susan (1995), Hollywood Sings!: An Inside Look at Sixty Years of Academy Award-Nominated Songs, New York, New York, United States: Billboard Books, ISBN 978-0-8230-7623-9
- Terrance, Vincent (2013). Television Specials: 5,336 Entertainment Programs, 1936–2012 (5 ed.). Jefferson, North Carolina, United States: Ballantine Books, McFarland & Company. ISBN 978-1-4766-1240-9. OCLC 844373010.
- Wiley, Mason; Bona, Damien (1996), Inside Oscar: The Unofficial History of the Academy Awards (5 ed.), New York, New York, United States: Ballantine Books, ISBN 978-0-3454-0053-6, OCLC 779680732
