= Paul Elliott (cinematographer) =

English cinematographer

- Born: 18 October 1947 (age 78); London, England
- Education: London Film School
- Occupation: Cinematographer
- Years active: 1978–present
- Website: paulelliottdp.com

Paul Elliott (born 18 October 1947) is an English cinematographer. He was nominated for three ASC Awards for his work on the television films Citizen Cohn (1992), And the Band Played On (1993), and Truman (1995), winning for the lattermost.

== Selected filmography ==
Director of photography

=== Film ===
Year	Film	Director	Notes
1985	Biohazard	Fred Olen Ray	First of five collaborations with Olen Ray
1986	The Tomb	Fred Olen Ray	
1986	Armed Response	Fred Olen Ray	
1986	Prison Ship	Fred Olen Ray	
1987	Cyclone	Fred Olen Ray	
1987	Rachel River	Sandy Smolan	
1988	Friday the 13th Part VII: The New Blood	John Carl Buechler	
1988	976-EVIL	Robert Englund	
1989	Far from Home	Meiert Avis	
1990	Daddy's Dyin'... Who's Got the Will?	Jack Fisk	
1990	Welcome Home, Roxy Carmichael	Jim Abrahams	
1991	And You Thought Your Parents Were Weird	Tony Cookson	
1991	My Girl	Howard Zieff	First collaboration with Zieff
1994	My Girl 2	Howard Zieff	
1997	Santa Fe	Andrew Shea	
1997	Soul Food	George Tillman Jr.	
1999	Lost & Found	Jeff Pollack	
1999	Diamonds	John Asher	
2000	The Broken Hearts Club	Greg Berlanti	
2004	Elvis Has Left the Building	Joel Zwick	First collaboration with Zwick
2004	Fat Albert	Joel Zwick	
2008	Spy School	Mark Blutman	
2008	Beer for My Horses	Michael Salomon	
2009	Deadly Impact	Robert Kurtzman	
2013	Dark Around the Stars	Derrick Borte	
2018	Hellbent	Tjardus Greidanus	

Camera and electrical department

Year	Film	Director	Role	Notes
1978	Disco Fever	Lamar Card	Camera assistant	
1979	Rock 'n' Roll High School	Allan Arkush	Camera assistant	
1979	The Lady in Red	Lewis Teague	Assistant camera	
1980	Humanoids from the Deep	Barbara Peeters; Jimmy T. Murakami	Assistant camera	
1980	Battle Beyond the Stars	Jimmy T. Murakami	Camera operator	
1980	The Unseen	Danny Steinmann	First assistant camera	
1981	Student Bodies	Mickey Rose; Michael Ritchie	Director of photography: Second unit First assistant camera	
1981	Saturday the 14th	Howard R. Cohen	Camera operator	
1981	The End of August	Bob Graham	Additional photographer	
1982	The Sword and the Sorcerer	Albert Pyun	Assistant camera: Second unit	
1982	Kiss My Grits	Jack Starrett	Camera operator	
1983	The American Snitch	Richard A. Harris	Director of photography: Second unit	
1984	The Philadelphia Experiment	Stewart Raffill	First assistant camera	
1984	Dreamscape	Joseph Ruben	First assistant camera	
1984	Crimes of Passion	Ken Russell	First assistant camera	
1985	School Spirit	Alan Holleb	Camera operator: Second unit	
1986	The Longshot	Paul Bartel	Additional camera operator	
1986	Night of the Creeps	Fred Dekker	Second camera operator	
1986	Vasectomy: A Delicate Matter	Robert Burge	Second camera	
1986	Trick or Treat	Charles Martin Smith	Director of photography: Second unit	
1987	Stacking	Martin Rosen	Additional photography	
1993	Say a Little Prayer	Richard Lowenstein	Additional photographer Effects photographer	
1994	The Hudsucker Proxy	Joel Coen	Director of photography: Second unit	First collaboration with the Coen brothers
2002	The Good Girl	Miguel Arteta	Director of photography: Additional photography	
2007	No Country for Old Men	Coen brothers	Director of photography: Second unit	Second collaboration with the Coen brothers
2009	Hardwired	Ernie Barbarash	Director of photography: New Mexico	
2010	Legion	Scott Stewart	Director of photography: Second unit	
2010	The Company Men	John Wells	Director of photography: Second unit	
2010	True Grit	Coen brothers	Camera operator: Splinter unit, Austin Director of photography: Splinter unit, Austin	Third collaboration with the Coen brothers
2013	The Host	Andrew Niccol	Additional director of photography: New Mexico	
2014	A Million Ways to Die in the West	Seth MacFarlane	Camera operator: "B" camera Director of photography: Second unit	
2015	The Ridiculous 6	Frank Coraci	2nd unit cinematographer 2nd unit cinematographer: Second unit	
2016	Captain Fantastic	Matt Ross	Additional camera operator: "B" camera, New Mexico	
2022	Vengeance	B. J. Novak	Camera operator: "A" camera	

=== Direct-to-video films ===
Year	Film	Director
2008	Love Lies Bleeding	Keith Samples

=== Documentaries ===
Year	Film	Director
1981	Dust to Dust	Sabina Wynn

=== TV movies ===
Year	Film	Director	Notes
1990	The Lost Capone	John Gray	
1991	Final Verdict	Jack Fisk	
1992	A Private Matter	Joan Micklin Silver	
1992	Citizen Cohn	Frank Pierson	
1993	Blind Side	Geoff Murphy	
1993	And the Band Played On	Roger Spottiswoode	
1994	Leave of Absence	Tom McLoughlin	
1994	Someone She Knows	Eric Laneuville	
1995	The Piano Lesson	Lloyd Richards	
1995	If Someone Had Known	Eric Laneuville	
1995	Truman	Frank Pierson	
1996	A Case for Life	Eric Laneuville	
1996	Riot	Alex Munoz; David C. Johnson; Galen Yuen; Richard DiLello	
1997	Van Helsing Chronicles	Geoffrey Sax	
1998	Chance of a Lifetime	Deborah Reinisch	
1998	Thanks of a Grateful Nation	Rod Holcomb	
2000	If These Walls Could Talk 2	Jane Anderson	"1961" segment
2000	Jackie Bouvier Kennedy Onassis	David Burton Morris	
2001	When Billie Beat Bobby	Jane Anderson	
2002	King of Texas	Uli Edel	
2003	The Law and Mr. Lee	Kevin Rodney Sullivan	
2005	Mayday	T. J. Scott	
2008	Front of the Class	Peter Werner	
2009	Georgia O'Keeffe	Bob Balaban	
2011	The Sunset Limited	Tommy Lee Jones	

=== TV series ===
Year	Title	Notes
1989	ABC Afterschool Special	1 episode
1990	Equal Justice	1 episode
1990	Tales from the Crypt	2 episodes
2015−16	House of Cards	3 episodes
2019	Chambers	2 episodes
2020	Interrogation	4 episodes
2022	Walker: Independence	2 episodes
2022−23	Dark Winds	11 episodes
TBA	Duster	2 episodes

Camera and electrical department

Year	Title	Role	Notes
2015	Blood & Oil	Camera operator	9 episodes
2022	Walker: Independence	"B" camera operator	1 episode

== Awards and nominations ==
Year	Festival / Award	Category	Nominated work	Result	Ref.
1988	Sundance Film Festival	Excellence in Cinematography Award Dramatic	Rachel River	Won	
1993	CableACE Awards	Best Direction of Photography and/or Lighting Direction in a Dramatic or Theatrical Special/Movie or Miniseries	Citizen Cohn	Nominated	
1993	American Society of Cinematographers Awards	Outstanding Achievement in Cinematography in Motion Picture, Limited Series, or Pilot Made for Television	Citizen Cohn	Nominated	
1995	American Society of Cinematographers Awards	Outstanding Achievement in Cinematography in Motion Picture, Limited Series, or Pilot Made for Television	And the Band Played On	Nominated	
1996	American Society of Cinematographers Awards	Outstanding Achievement in Cinematography in Motion Picture, Limited Series, or Pilot Made for Television	Truman	Won	
