= Rebecca Hall (disambiguation) =

Rebecca Hall (born 1982) is an English actress and director.

Rebecca Hall may also refer to:

- Rebecca Hall (musician) (born 1965), American folk singer/songwriter
- Rebecca Hall (1981–2001), serial killer victim
- Rebecca Nolin (born 1983), born Rebecca Jane Hall, English football coach and former player

== See also ==
- Rebecca Hill (disambiguation)
