= Fall line (disambiguation) =

Fall line commonly refers to:

- Fall line, a geomorphological feature
- Fall line (topography), the line of greatest slope on an incline

Fall line may also refer to:

== Places ==
- Atlantic Seaboard Fall Line, a long escarpment in the Eastern United States
  - Fall Line Freeway, Georgia State Route 540
  - Fall Line Trail, a multi-use trail project in Virginia

== Media ==
- Fall Line (film), a 1980 American skiing short film
- The Fall Line (podcast), an American true crime podcast
- The Fall Line (EP), a 2015 release by Sunset Sons

== Companies ==
- Falls Line, a Scottish shipping line
- Fall Line Studios, a division of Disney Interactive Studios
- Fall Line Entertainment, a former name for Mantra Films
