= 1981 Academy Awards =

1981 Academy Awards may refer to:

- 53rd Academy Awards, the Academy Awards ceremony that took place in 1981
- 54th Academy Awards, the 1982 ceremony honoring the best in film for 1981
