= Second Heaven (disambiguation) =

Second Heaven is a 1982 novel by Judith Guest.

It may also refer to:

- Second Heaven in the Seven Heavens
- Second Heaven (album) (第二天堂; Di Er Tian Tang), a 2004 album by Taiwanese singer JJ Lin
