= Peter Ladue =

American film director and writer (born 1950)

- Born: 1950 (age 75–76)
- Education: Boston University
- Occupation: Film director
- Years active: 1965–present
- Awards: Best Documentary Short Subject; 1980 Karl Hess: Toward Liberty

Peter Ladue (born 1950) is an American film director and writer. In 1981, Ladue and Roland Halle' won the Oscar for Best Documentary Short Subject for producing Karl Hess: Toward Liberty. Incorporating interviews, archival footage, and animation, the film chronicles the life of Karl Hess.

== Karl Hess: Toward Liberty ==
This 26 minute film, Ladue's and Halle's master thesis, was produced at Boston University's College of Communications, Graduate Film Program. The film's style and approach is a reaction to the Direct Cinema movement Direct Cinema and co-called balanced television documentaries of the 1960s and 1970s. Direct Cinema made a claim on objectivity (real stories about real life), while Karl Hess: Toward Liberty tells a transparently subjective story, presenting the point of view of one man who experienced American politics from both the inside and out.

== Academy Award ==
In 1981, the Academy of Motion Picture Arts and Sciences' (AMPAS) AMPAS 53rd award ceremony was delayed, 53rd Academy Awardsalmost cancelled, when President Ronald Reagan was shot on the day of the scheduled event. The following day, the Academy Awards took place with the President addressing the audience via a television remote link-up from his hospital bed. Receiving the award from actors Richard Chamberlain and Lesley-Anne Down, Ladue and Halle' thanked the team of Boston University students and others who collaborated in the making of the film. Karl Hess: Toward Liberty was the first AMPAS Student Film Award-winner to also be awarded an Oscar.

== Additional awards ==
In addition to winning the Oscar, the film also was awarded the FOCUS Student Film Award, in 1980; the AMPAS Student Film Award, in 1980, the CINE Golden Eagle, in 1981, along with 18 additional international festivals, including the American Film Institute's AFI Award, in 1981. Karl Hess: Toward Liberty was screened at the White House and the New York Museum of Modern Art, as a result of the FOCUS Award and toured the world, as part of the CINE program.

== Additional productions ==
Ladue also won an Emmy Award for Best Sports Special, in 1996, for directing The Banner Years: The Official History of the Boston Garden. Just one month after release, Banner Years became the all-time best-selling special interest video in New England.

In 1996, working with local high school students and a team of creative professionals, Ladue directed production of The Civil Right Rap, a music video designed to reacquaint young people with the Civil Rights Movement. This educational video was screened at the United Nations, on BET and was distributed to over a thousand high schools.

He also directed production of Saving Place, a widely televised documentary on preserving the character of rural New England, for the National Trust for Historic Preservation.

== Honors ==
- Academy Award for Documentary Short Subject, 1981.
- Emmy Award: Best Sports Special, 1996.
- Over 50 international awards for creative excellence.
- Voting Member and Documentary Judge, Academy of Motion Picture Arts and Sciences, 1981–present.
- Work has been presented at the United Nations, the White House, New York's Museum of Modern Art, the Boston Garden, and the American Film Institute.
- Productions have been broadcast on CBS, ABC, PBS, the BBC, The Discovery Channel, TNT, and MTV.
