= Rachel River =

1987 film by Sandy Smolan

- Theatrical release poster
- Directed by: Sandy Smolan
- Written by: Judith Guest
- Based on: Letters From the Country by Carol Bly
- Produced by: Timothy Marx; Nan Simons
- Starring: Pamela Reed; Viveca Lindfors; Željko Ivanek; James Olson; Craig T. Nelson
- Cinematography: Paul Elliott
- Edited by: Susan R. Crutcher
- Music by: Arvo Pärt
- Distributed by: Taurus Entertainment Company
- Release dates: September 17, 1987 (Toronto); January 20, 1989 (United States)
- Running time: 85 minutes
- Country: United States
- Language: English
- Budget: $1.2 million

Rachel River is a 1987 American drama film directed by Sandy Smolan and written by Judith Guest. It is inspired by Letters From the Country, a collection of short stories by Carol Bly. The film centers on the residents of a small northern Minnesota town. It stars Pamela Reed, Viveca Lindfors, Željko Ivanek, James Olson, and Craig T. Nelson. The film premiered at the Toronto International Film Festival and was given a limited theatrical release on January 20, 1989.

== Plot ==
The film follows various townspeople in the small, predominantly Scandinavian community of Rachel River in northern Minnesota. Mary Graving, an independent, unattached young woman, works for a weekly radio show. She is also a single mother who worries about her ability to provide for her children. Mary must contend with the advances of several local men, including ex-husband Cordell; Jack, a funeral director; and Marlyn, the deputy sheriff.

Meanwhile, Harriet White, the stoic wife of a farmer, bravely confronts the impending death of her husband. Momo, a developmentally disabled man, may know the truth about rumors that a hoard of cash was hidden on the property of Svea Estava, a recently deceased townswoman.

== Cast ==
- Pamela Reed as Mary Graving
- Viveca Lindfors as Harriet White
- Željko Ivanek as "Momo"
- James Olson as Jack Canon
- Craig T. Nelson as Marlyn Huutula
- Richard Jenkins as Cordell
- Jo Henderson as Estona
- Alan North as Beske
- Richard Riehle as Mervyn "Merv"
- Nick Benedict as Christopher Burnette

== Production ==
The film was a longtime passion project for Sandy Smolan. He first got the idea for the film in 1983 after moving to Moose Lake, Minnesota from New York for a job and wanting to do a feature about the community where he lived. For a few years, he could not envision what the story would be about until he remembered he was given Letters From the Country, a short story collection written by Carol Bly shortly before leaving New York. The stories are set in the Moose Lake area. He decided to adapt it and was able to get Judith Guest, author of the novel Ordinary People and a Minnesotan, to write the script. Financing was a prolonged process involving grants from the Corporation for Public Broadcasting and PBS's American Playhouse. In 1984 and 1985, Smolan was invited to present his concept for the film at the Sundance Institute. The film was the recipient of the first ever Sundance/Panavision Filmmaker Grant, which provided the production with a Panaflex camera that permitted filming in temperatures of 20 below zero.

Filming took place over 30 days in November 1986, in Sandstone, Minnesota with post-production completed in August 1987. The budget was $1.2 million (equivalent to $3.52 million in 2025).

== Release ==
The film had its world premiere at the Toronto International Film Festival on September 17, 1987. Thereafter, it played the film festival circuit, including the 1988 Sundance Film Festival, Berlin Film Festival, and the Seattle International Film Festival.

A year after its Toronto premiere, the film secured a distribution deal with Taurus Entertainment Company, a specialty unit of United Artists. It was given a limited theatrical release on January 20, 1989.

The film was broadcast on American Playhouse in June 1989.

== Critical reception ==
The film received mixed reviews. Kevin Thomas of the Los Angeles Times gave a positive review in which he praised the performances of Lindfors and Reed. He concluded,

What distinguishes 'Rachel River' from most other independent American films is not only its ensemble portrayals under the spare and rigorous direction of Sandy Smolan, a documentary film maker in his feature debut. It also boasts appropriately austere images, captured by cinematographer Paul Elliott and its exceptionally rich and evocative score, composed by the distinctive New Age composer Arvo Pärt. The contrast between the way 'Rachel River'...looks and the way it sounds expresses perfectly the difference between the faces its people try to present to the world and what's going on behind them.

The San Francisco Bay Guardian called it "well-acted, low-keyed" and "beautifully photographed and well-written" with "unique, understated flow." The Motion Picture Guide praised the film's performances as "wonderful, albeit small-scaled" and called the cinematography and music "a knockout in two areas," with specific praise for Paul Elliott's "Nykvist-rich lenswork" and Arvo Pärt's "piercingly evocative" score. The New Leader gave the film a negative review, with critic John Morrone describing it as "airless, stagnant" and criticizing the filmmakers for turning the material into "deep freeze cinema." Spirituality & Practice praised the film, writing "Rachel River is a magical movie about the emotional education of adults in a world of mysteries which have no name and of little things that people are reluctant to talk about, such as vague longings, roving fears, and unfulfilled dreams."

== Awards ==
The film won the Excellence in Cinematography Award Dramatic for Paul Elliott and a Special Jury Prize for Acting for Viveca Lindfors at the 1988 Sundance Film Festival.
