= Journey for Survival =

1981 film

- Directed by: Dick Young
- Written by: Stephan Wilkinson
- Produced by: Bernard Gerin; Dick Young
- Cinematography: Dick Young
- Edited by: Bill McNally
- Production company: Dick Young Productions
- Distributed by: United Nations
- Release date: 1981
- Running time: 15 minutes
- Country: United States
- Language: English

Journey for Survival is a 1981 American short documentary film directed by Dick Young. It was nominated for an Academy Award for Best Documentary Short.
