= Ordinary People (play) =

Dramatic stage play written by American playwright Nancy Paul Gilsenan

- Written by: Nancy Pahl-Gilsenen
- Original language: English
- Genre: Drama
- Setting: Lake Forest, Illinois

Premiere
- Date premiered: 1983

Ordinary People is a dramatic stage play written by American playwright Nancy Pahl-Gilsenan. Gilsenan published the adaptation in 1983, three years after the successful film version was released in 1980. The original novel was published by Judith Guest in 1976.

== Characters ==
- Conrad Jarrett, a boy in his late teens
- Calvin Jarrett, Conrad's father
- Beth Jarrett, Conrad's mother
- Joe Lanzenby, Conrad's best friend
- Stillman, Conrad's swim team acquaintance
- Jeannine Pratt, Conrad's girlfriend
- Karen Aldrich, Conrad's hospital acquaintance
- Doctor Berger, Conrad's psychiatrist
- Coach Salan, Conrad's swim coach

== Production history ==
The play is a popular choice for community theatres and schools, and has been produced around the world. A 1992 production by the Young Artists Ensemble in Thousands, Oaks, California was reviewed by the Los Angeles Times. Pelican Studios Theatre in New York City staged a production in 2004. The Citadel Theatre Company in Lake Forest, Illinois staged a production in 2015 . A reading was held by Almost Adults Productions in Santa Fe, New Mexico in 2018.

In review of a production in St. Louis, Missouri, the differences from the novel/film and the play were highlighted as "Gilsenan’s adaptation overall stays true to the source material, lifting much of the dialogue directly from the book. However, it also focuses much more on Conrad’s trajectory than that of Calvin and Beth’s. This is a subtle departure from the source material, which alternates between Conrad and Calvin’s points of view.".
