= Resurrection (1980 film) =

1980 American film by Daniel Petrie

- Promotional poster for Resurrection
- Directed by: Daniel Petrie
- Written by: Lewis John Carlino
- Produced by: Renee Missel; Howard Rosenman
- Starring: Ellen Burstyn; Sam Shepard; Richard Farnsworth; Roberts Blossom; Clifford David; Pamela Payton-Wright; Jeffrey DeMunn; Eva Le Gallienne
- Cinematography: Mario Tosi
- Edited by: Rita Roland
- Music by: Maurice Jarre
- Distributed by: Universal Pictures
- Release date: September 26, 1980
- Running time: 103 minutes
- Country: United States
- Language: English
- Budget: $6 million
- Box office: $3,910,019

Resurrection is a 1980 American fantasy drama film directed by Daniel Petrie, written by Lewis John Carlino, and starring Ellen Burstyn, Sam Shepard, Richard Farnsworth, Roberts Blossom, Lois Smith and Eva Le Gallienne. It was produced by Renée Missel and Howard Rosenman. The plot involves a woman who returns to life after dying momentarily in a car crash and finds that she has the power to heal people.

At the 53rd Academy Awards, Resurrection earned Burstyn and Le Gallienne nominations for Best Actress and Best Supporting Actress respectively, while Burstyn received a nomination for Best Actress in a Motion Picture – Drama at the 38th Golden Globe Awards. At the National Board of Review Awards 1980, Le Gallienne won Best Supporting Actress, while the film was selected as one of the top ten films of 1980.

== Plot ==
Edna Mae McCauley survives a car accident that kills her husband and nearly kills her, but her brief out-of-body experience gives her the power to heal people. Paralyzed from the waist down, Edna returns with her father to her small hometown in Kansas to recuperate and be cared for by family. On their way, they stop at "Last Chance Gas," run by the friendly and eccentric Esco Brown. Welcomed home by family, Edna unwittingly heals a little girl at a party with chronic nosebleeds, to the bewilderment of those around her. Edna's grandmother tells her of a woman she knew who had briefly died from pneumonia and returned to life; this woman experienced the same visions as Edna when her spirit left her body, and when she returned to life she too had the power to heal people. Edna eventually heals herself and slowly begins to walk again. She becomes an unwitting celebrity, the hope of those in desperate need of healing, and a lightning rod for religious beliefs and skeptics.

When Edna heals Cal Carpenter, a local farmer, from a stab wound he sustained in a fight, he begins to court her, and the two eventually begin a romantic relationship. As their relationship blossoms, Edna begins to heal her own psychological wounds, coming to peace with the death of her husband and working to understand her new fate. However, Cal believes that Edna's mystical abilities are a sign of God's will, and he refuses to accept her belief that her powers simply come from deep love and understanding, and he slowly becomes unstable. After two psychologists witness one of Edna's healings, they ask her if she would be willing to undergo some tests. She and Cal accompany them to California, where Edna heals a woman with dystonia. Believing this to be too much power, Cal confronts Edna and demands she proclaims herself as Christ resurrected, which she refuses. Cal eventually attempts to assassinate Edna during one of her healing gatherings by shooting her, but he misses, just grazing her shoulder. After Cal is incarcerated, Edna decides to leave her hometown.

Several years pass, and we see a much older Edna now running Esco's gas station. A young couple with an adolescent son who is dying of cancer are traveling to see relatives when they stop for gas. Edna suggests the mother and father look at her desert flower collection while she and the son have a talk, and she heals the son before they continue on their way.

== Cast ==
- Ellen Burstyn – Edna Mae (Harper) McCauley
- Jeffrey DeMunn – Joseph "Joe" McCauley, Edna's husband
- Roberts Blossom – John Harper, Edna's father
- Eva Le Gallienne – Pearl, Edna's grandmother
- Lois Smith – Kathy, Edna's cousin
- Sam Shepard – Cal Carpenter, Edna's lover
- Richard Hamilton – Reverend Earl Carpenter, Cal's father
- Richard Farnsworth – Esco Brown, owner of "Last Chance Gas"
- Sylvia Walden – Louise, a woman Edna heals in Los Angeles
- Madeleine Thornton-Sherwood – Ruth, a townswoman Edna heals
- Bernard Behrens – Dr. Fisher

== Production ==
It was announced in 1976 that writer Stephen Geller had penned a supernatural thriller screenplay under the working title The Resurrection, based on an idea by producers Renée Missel and Howard Rosenman. The script would later be reworked by writer Lewis John Carlino, and Geller did not remain with the project and did not receive onscreen credit. Carlino worked closely with actress Ellen Burstyn, and they observed healing centers together. Carlino was able to weave many of Burstyn's beliefs and philosophy about healing into her character. Filming took place on location in Texas, and principal photography was completed in 1979.

== Release ==
Resurrection opened in 420 theaters across the U.S. on September 26, 1980, before expanding further on November 7, 1980. The film eventually grossed $3,910,019, against a budget of $6 million, making it a box office disappointment.

== Reception ==
=== Critical response ===
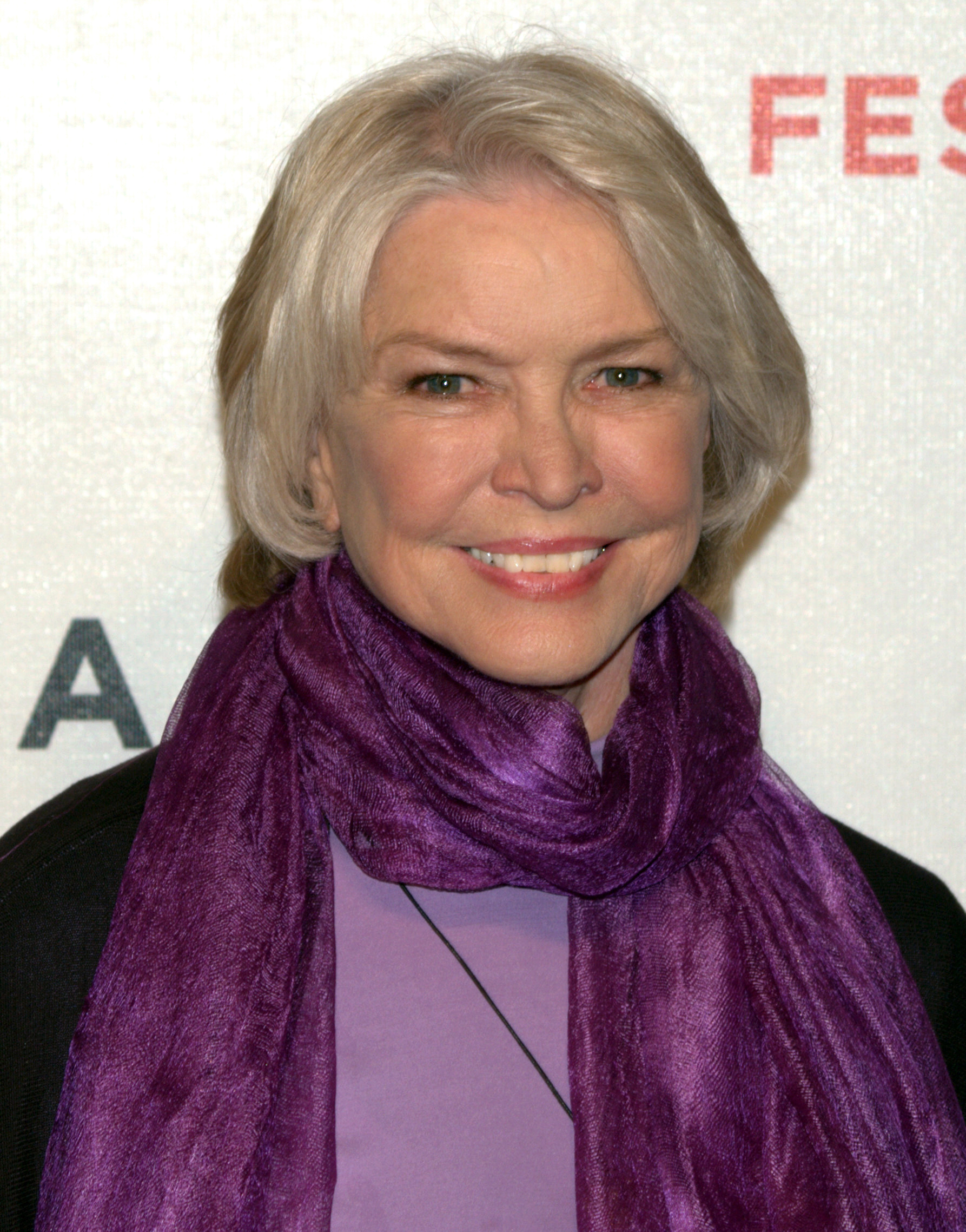
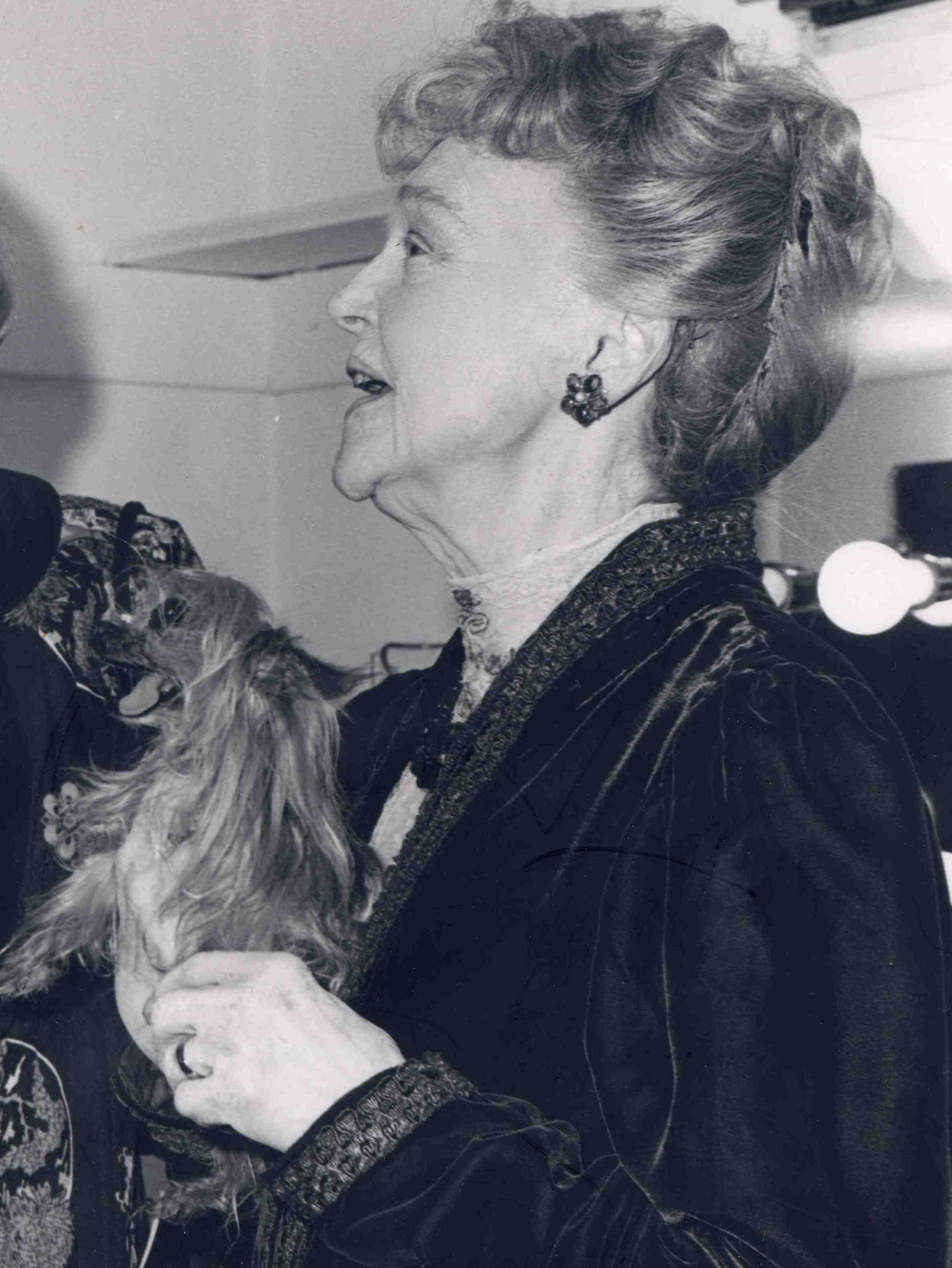
The performances of Ellen Burstyn and Eva Le Gallienne garnered critical acclaim, earning them Academy Award nominations for Best Actress and Best Supporting Actress, respectively.

Resurrection was acclaimed by critics, and currently holds an 83% approval rating on Rotten Tomatoes based on six reviews, with an average rating of 7.50/10. AllMovie gave the film 4 stars out of 5 and called it "an affecting film with a brilliant performance by Ellen Burstyn," observing "very much an actor-driven film, this deliberately unflashy treatment of an emotionally charged subject is all the more persuasive for its style."

Gene Siskel and Roger Ebert gave the film a highly enthusiastic review on their weekly TV show Sneak Previews, with both critics praising Burstyn's performance and the handling of the subject matter. In his annual movie guide, Leonard Maltin rated the film 31/2 stars out of 4, and noted the story as "beautifully realized," while praising Burstyn's "moving performance" as the "centerpiece of a wonderful and underrated film."

Frederic and Mary Ann Brussat of Spirituality & Practice wrote very positively of the film: "Resurrection is a very timely film in that it deals with health, sickness, healers (religious and non-religious), and the interest science has in this whole phenomenon. On a purely emotional level, this movie forces viewers to come to terms with their feelings about death, love, community, spirituality, and self-repair. Thanks to a stirring and remarkable performance by Ellen Burstyn, Resurrection lingers in the mind and heart long after the closing credits.

In a positive review of the film, film-authority.com stated: "Resurrection is a well-mounted and acted film, but the point is hard to nail down to one specific meaning. Is Edna a messiah, does she actually have supernatural powers? Or is this all an operating table dream a la Jacob's Ladder? Anyone's guess is good; this is an opaque film that it's possible to read almost anything into, and yet the timeline is straight as a die; perhaps mixing up the events might have added an extra layer of engagement for the audience to try to piece things together? Either way, this is a genuine curio, a thoughtful film about healing that never quite explains itself, right to an ingenious ending, but is all the better for leaving plenty of room for interpretation according to your own beliefs.

Janet Maslin of the New York Times wrote very positively of the film: "Resurrection is a movie about faith, and one that must be taken on faith. It's a little bit mad. But it has the courage of its conviction, and a beauty and persuasiveness that help keep the doubts at bay. Miss Burstyn gives the kind of performance that makes all the odd events in the screenplay seem perfectly plausible, perfectly sane. Her presence is radiant, and so steadying it lets the movie exert a tremendous emotional pull. The whole cast is outstanding." Maslin also singled out Paul Sylbert's production design as "particularly memorable", stating: "Resurrection is a handsome movie, with flat Southwestern and Middle Western scenery, and a lot of sky—not to mention the occasional cinematic trip to the Great Beyond. Mr. Petrie achieves a feeling of intimacy right in the middle of those wide-open spaces, without losing a sense of their grandeur. That's a worthy accomplishment."

=== Accolades ===
Award	Category	Nominee	Result	Ref.
Academy Awards	Best Actress	Ellen Burstyn	Nominated	
Academy Awards	Best Supporting Actress	Eva Le Gallienne	Nominated	
Avoriaz Fantastic Film Festival	Grand Prize	Daniel Petrie	Nominated	
Avoriaz Fantastic Film Festival	Special Jury Award	Daniel Petrie	Won	
Golden Globe Awards	Best Actress in a Motion Picture – Drama	Ellen Burstyn	Nominated	
National Board of Review Awards	Top Ten Films		10th Place	
National Board of Review Awards	Best Supporting Actress	Eva Le Gallienne	Won	
New York Film Critics Circle Awards	Best Supporting Actress	Eva Le Gallienne	4th Place	
Saturn Awards	Best Actress	Ellen Burstyn	Nominated	
Saturn Awards	Best Supporting Actress	Eva Le Gallienne	Nominated	
Saturn Awards	Best Writing	Lewis John Carlino	Nominated	
Saturn Awards	Best Music	Maurice Jarre	Nominated	

== Home media ==
Resurrection was released on VHS by Universal Pictures in 1990, and on DVD as part of the Universal Vault Series of DVD-on-Demand titles in 2010. The film was released for the first time on Blu-ray on November 5, 2019.

A restored version of the film from a new 2K scan was released on region-free Blu-ray by Australian label Via Vision Entertainment (Imprint) on February 22, 2023. Among the special features produced for the release is newly recorded interviews with star Ellen Burstyn and film historian Kat Ellinger, an audio commentary by author and film historian Lee Gambin, and a limited-edition slipcase on the first 1,500 copies produced.

== In other media ==
=== Book ===
A novelization was written by George Gipe and released in 1980.

=== Television ===
Resurrection was remade for television and broadcast on ABC on March 15, 1999. It was directed by Stephen Gyllenhaal and stars Dana Delany, with Nick Chinlund, Brenda Fricker and Rita Moreno in supporting roles.
