= Karl Hess: Toward Liberty =

1980 film

- Directed by: Roland Hallé; Peter Ladue
- Written by: Peter W. Ladue; Kevin Burns
- Produced by: Roland Hallé; Peter Ladue
- Starring: Karl Hess
- Narrated by: Kevin Burns
- Cinematography: John Hoover
- Edited by: Loren Miller
- Music by: Keith Martin; Don Wilkins, Berklee School of Music
- Production company: Boston University College of Communication
- Distributed by: Direct Cinema
- Release date: October 1980
- Running time: 26 minutes
- Country: United States
- Language: English

Karl Hess: Toward Liberty is a 1980 American short documentary film about the anarchist Karl Hess, directed by Roland Hallé and Peter Ladue. It won an Oscar in 1981 for Documentary Short Subject.

== Awards ==
- 1980 – Maya Dern Award, Boston University
- 1980 – FOCUS Student Film Festival, Best Film
- 1980 – AMPAS Student Film Award, Best Documentary
- 1981 – Academy Award for Best Documentary (Short Subject)
- 1981 – CINE Golden Eagle
- 1981 – Governor's Award, State of Massachusetts

== Cast ==
- Karl Hess as himself (also archive footage)
- Kevin Burns as narrator (voice)
- Barry Goldwater as himself (archive footage)
- Adolf Hitler as himself (archive footage)
- Lyndon Johnson as himself (archive footage) (uncredited)
