= National Board of Review Awards 1980 =

Annual US film awards ceremony

52nd National Board of Review Awards
January 26, 1981
Best Film: Ordinary People

The 52nd National Board of Review Awards were announced on December 18, 1980, and given on January 26, 1981.

== Top Ten Films ==
1. Ordinary People
2. Raging Bull
3. Coal Miner's Daughter
4. Tess
5. Melvin and Howard
6. The Great Santini
7. The Elephant Man
8. The Stunt Man
9. My Bodyguard
10. Resurrection

== Top Foreign Films ==
1. The Tin Drum
2. Kagemusha
3. Knife in the Head
4. From the Life of the Marionettes
5. Eboli

== Winners ==
- Best Film: Ordinary People
- Best Foreign Film: The Tin Drum
- Best Actor: Robert De Niro (Raging Bull)
- Best Actress: Sissy Spacek (Coal Miner's Daughter)
- Best Supporting Actor: Joe Pesci (Raging Bull)
- Best Supporting Actress: Eva Le Gallienne (Resurrection)
- Best Director: Robert Redford (Ordinary People)
- Career Achievement Award: Gloria Swanson
