= Rebecca Hill =

Rebecca or Becky Hill may refer to:

- Rebecca Hill, author and key figure in the trial of Alex Murdaugh
- Rebecca Hill, co-author of Killing Time in St. Cloud
- Becky Hill (Rebecca Claire Hill, 1994), English singer and songwriter
- Bec Hill (Rebecca Hill, 1986), Australian comedian
- Becky Hill, see 2012 United States Junior Curling Championships
