= Pamela Reed =

American actress

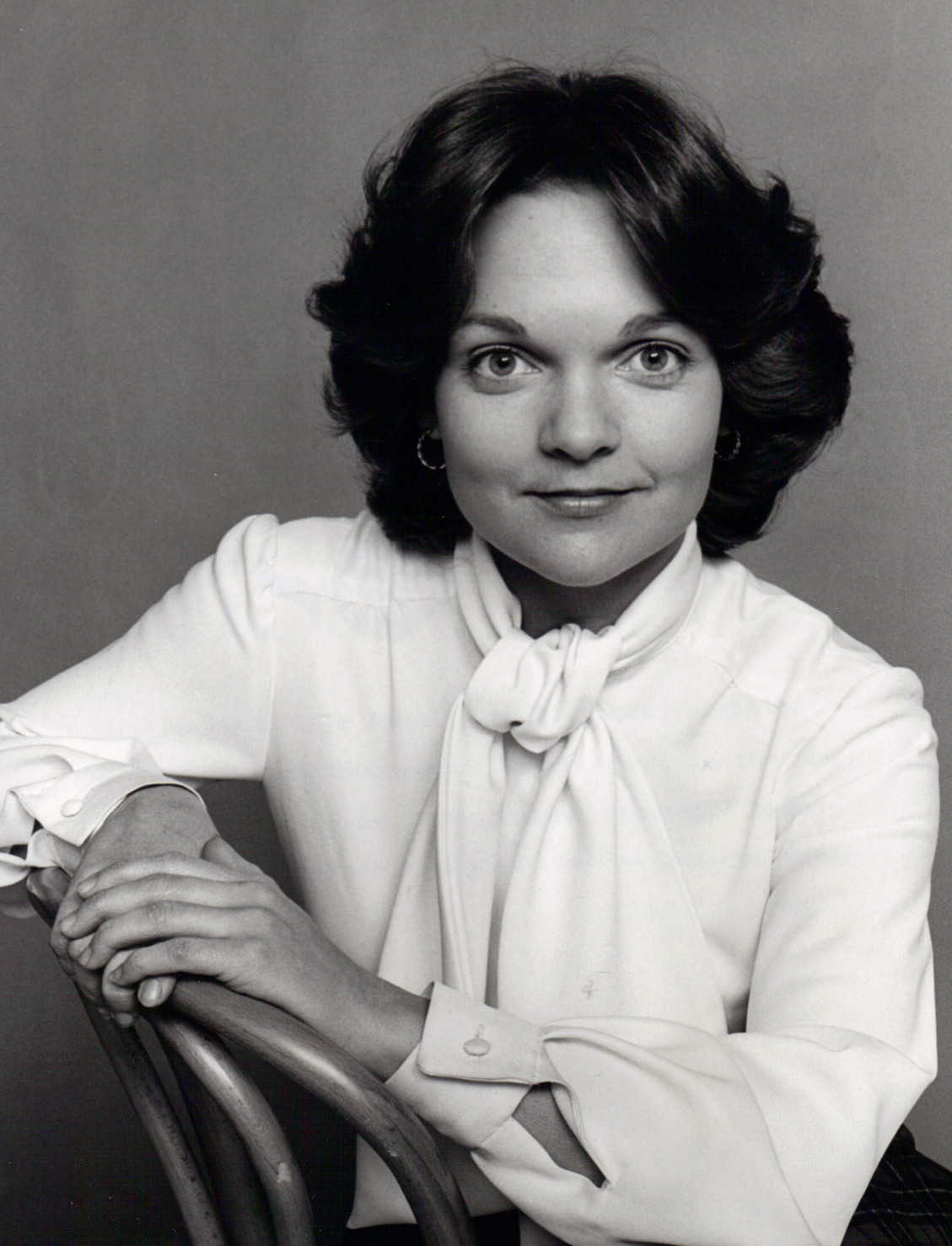
- Reed in 1977
- Born: 1949 (age 76–77); Tacoma, Washington, U.S.
- Education: University of Washington (BFA)
- Occupation: Actress
- Years active: 1976–present
- Spouse: Sandy Smolan (m. 1988)
- Children: 2

Pamela Reed (born 1949) is an American actress. She is known for playing Arnold Schwarzenegger's police partner Phoebe O'Hara in the 1990 film Kindergarten Cop and portraying the matriarch Gail Green in Jericho. She appeared as Marlene Griggs-Knope on the NBC sitcom Parks and Recreation, as well as the exasperated wife Alison Langley in Bean.

== Early life and education ==
She was born in 1949 in Tacoma, Washington. She lived there until age 11, when her family moved to Maryland. Se then returned to Tacoma at 18. Reed received her B.F.A. at the University of Washington.

== Career ==
Reed earned a Drama Desk Award for the off-Broadway play Getting Out and an Obie Award for "sustaining excellence in performance in theater". She was a regular in the cast of the 1977 CBS drama The Andros Targets, playing a young assistant journalist named Sandi Farrell. She had minor film and television work in the 1980s. She won a CableAce Award for Best Actress for the HBO series Tanner '88 (1988). She also co-starred with Daryl Hannah in the film The Clan of the Cave Bear (1986).

Her notable film roles include The Long Riders (1980), The Right Stuff (1983), The Best of Times (1986), Kindergarten Cop (1990), Junior (1994), Deadly Whispers (1995), Bean (1997) and Proof of Life (2001).

Reed played Janice Pasetti in the quirky NBC sitcom Grand, and then played a judge and single mother in the short-lived NBC sitcom The Home Court. She has provided the voice for the character Ruth Powers in the animated TV series The Simpsons and guest-voiced in an episode of the 1994–1995 animated series The Critic. She played a main role in Jericho and portrayed the mother of main character Leslie Knope (Amy Poehler) on Parks and Recreation.

In 2005 Reed portrayed executive producer Esther Shapiro in Dynasty: The Making of a Guilty Pleasure, a fictionalized television movie based on the creation and behind-the-scenes production of the 1980s prime-time soap opera Dynasty.

== Personal life ==
Reed met Sandy Smolan when he directed her in Rachel River. They married in 1988 and have two adopted children.

== Filmography ==
=== Film ===
| Year | Title | Role | Ref | Notes |
|---|---|---|---|---|
| 1980 | The Long Riders | Belle Starr | | |
| 1980 | Melvin and Howard | Bonnie Dummar | | |
| 1981 | Eyewitness | Linda Mercer | | |
| 1982 | Young Doctors in Love | Nurse Norine Sprockett | | |
| 1983 | The Right Stuff | Trudy Cooper | | |
| 1984 | The Goodbye People | Shirley / Nancie Scot | | |
| 1986 | The Clan of the Cave Bear | Iza | | |
| 1986 | The Best of Times | Gigi Hightower | | |
| 1987 | Rachel River | Mary Graving | | |
| 1989 | Chattahoochee | Earlene | | |
| 1990 | Redlands | Maude | | Video short |
| 1990 | Cadillac Man | Tina | | |
| 1990 | Kindergarten Cop | LAPD Detective Phoebe O'Hara | | |
| 1992 | Passed Away | Terry Scanlan Pinter | | |
| 1992 | Bob Roberts | Carol Cruise | | |
| 1994 | Junior | Angela | | |
| 1997 | Santa Fe | Nancy Vigil | | |
| 1997 | Bean | Alison Langley | | |
| 1998 | Why Do Fools Fall in Love | Judge Lambrey | | |
| 1999 | Standing on Fishes | Janice | | |
| 2000 | Proof of Life | Janis Goodman | | |
| 2005 | Life of the Party | Evelyn | | |
| 2016 | Savannah Sunrise | Loraine | | |
| 2016 | The Architect | Coln's Mother | | |
| 2017 | Outside In | Aunt Bette | | |
| 2018 | The Long Dumb Road | Dotty | | |
| 2020 | Language Arts | Sister Giorgia | | |
| 2023 | The Burial | Annette O'Keefe | | |

=== Television ===
| Year | Title | Role | Notes |
|---|---|---|---|
| 1976 | Spencer's Pilots | Susan | Episode: "The Hitchhiker" |
| 1977 | The Andros Targets | Sandi Farrell | Main role |
| 1978 | All's Well That Ends Well | Helena | TV film |
| 1981 | Inmates: A Love Story | Sunny | TV film |
| 1983 | The Mississippi | Paige | Episode: "Beyond a Reasonable Doubt" |
| 1983 | I Want to Live | Edie Bannister | TV film |
| 1983 | Heart of Steel | Valerie | TV film |
| 1985 | Scandal Sheet | Helen Grant | TV film |
| 1988 | Hemingway | Mary Welsh | TV miniseries |
| 1988 | Tanner '88 | T.J. Cavanaugh | TV miniseries |
| 1988 | L.A. Law | Norma Heisler | Episode: "Romancing the Drone" |
| 1990 | Grand | Janice Pasetti | Main role |
| 1990 | Caroline? | Grace Carmichael | TV film |
| 1990 | The Civil War | Various (voice) | TV miniseries documentary |
| 1992 | Woman with a Past | Dee Johnson | TV film |
| 1992–1993, 2003, 2021 | The Simpsons | Ruth Powers (voice) | Episodes: "New Kid on the Block", "Marge on the Lam", "The Strong Arms of the Ma", "The Wayz We Were" |
| 1993 | Born Too Soon | Elizabeth Mehren | TV film |
| 1993 | Family Album | Denise Lerner | TV miniseries |
| 1994 | The Critic | Projectionist | Season 1, Episode 4 |
| 1995 | Deadly Whispers | Carol Acton | TV film |
| 1995 | Buford's Got a Gun | Laurie | TV film |
| 1995–96 | The Home Court | Judge Sydney J. Solomon | Main role |
| 1996 | The Man Next Door | Wanda Gilmore | TV film |
| 1996 | Critical Choices | Arlene | TV film |
| 1998 | Carriers | Holly Parker | TV film |
| 2001 | The Kennedys | Pamela Kennedy | TV film |
| 2003 | Book of Days | Grady | TV film |
| 2003 | Judging Amy | Sarah | Episode: "Shock and Awe" |
| 2004 | Tanner on Tanner | T.J. Cavanaugh | TV miniseries |
| 2004 | JAG | Major General Willsey | Episode: "Whole New Ball Game" |
| 2005 | Dynasty: The Making of a Guilty Pleasure | Esther Shapiro | TV film |
| 2005 | Jane Doe: Now You See It, Now You Don't | Fran Henkel | TV film |
| 2006 | Pepper Dennis | Lynn Dinkle | Recurring role |
| 2006–08 | Jericho | Gail Green | Regular role |
| 2008 | Eli Stone | Mrs. Stone | Episode: "Pilot", "Heartbeat" |
| 2009 | The Beast | Asst. Dir. Ida Paulson | 2 Episodes |
| 2009–11 | United States of Tara | Beverly Craine | 4 Episodes |
| 2009–12 | Parks and Recreation | Marlene Griggs-Knope | 9 Episodes |
| 2010 | Proposition 8 Trial Re-Enactment | Dr. M. V. Lee Badgett | TV series documentary |
| 2010 | Grey's Anatomy | Mrs. Banks | Episode: "Valentine's Day Massacre" |
| 2011–12 | CSI: Crime Scene Investigation | Donna Hoppe | Episode: "Genetic Disorder", "Risky Business Class" |
| 2012 | Perception | Mrs. Penderhalt | Episode: "86'd" |
| 2014 | Criminal Minds | Mary Bidwell | Episode: "Boxed In" |
| 2015–2023 | NCIS: Los Angeles | Roberta Deeks | Recurring role |
