= The Tarnished Eye =

- Cover of the first edition, published by Scribner
- Author: Judith Guest
- Language: English
- Genre: Crime
- Publication date: 2004
- Publication place: United States

The Tarnished Eye is a 2004 crime novel by American writer Judith Guest, inspired by the Robison family murders that occurred in June 1968 in Good Hart, Michigan and the murders committed by John Norman Collins in the Ann Arbor and Ypsilanti areas of Michigan in the late 1960s. In an interview with Metro Times, Guest explained why she chose to write a fictionalized account of these two murder cases: "I’m very interested in people’s motivations, why they do the things they do, why go to such extremes as if that’s the only solution to their problem. Those two crimes laid awake in my mind for a long time, and, about five years ago, I decided to write about them, but write a novel."
