= Dick Young (producer) =

American producer

Richard (Dick) Young is an American film producer, director, and cinematographer.

== Education and career ==
Young attended Augusta Military Academy for high school and University of Maryland for college. He is the son of Sara Young, head booker in the Washington, D.C., office for 20th-Century Fox. He worked in theater exhibitor roles, including at the Independent Theatre Service in Washington, D.C. Young was a student booker at 20th-Century Fox Boston office, transferred to full booker in the Albany, NY office, and was the head booker at the office from which he resigned in 1959.

His films were nominated for 3 Oscars and he won a national Emmy Award. Young established is own production company producing sponsored films for corporations and international organizations. Three of his films, Remember Me (1979), It's the Same World (1980), and ‘’Journey for Survival’’ (1981) nominations for Oscars for Best Documentary (Short).

== Filmography ==
- The Thing at Foxcatcher Farms (1968), with Life magazine and Cine Reynard, which won a "Chris" Statuette for excellence in filmmaking in cultural arts at the 16th Annual Columbus Film Festival in 1968.
- And So Ends (1972), documentary that sees the recollection of octogenarian Robert Cushman Murphy to provide a historical view of whaling and to present a plea for the preservation of the whale, narrated by Jack Palance
- Population--Challenge and Response (1974), documentary about how the population issue is being tackled in different, mainly developing countries
- Water (1976), documentary that shows the importance of water in man's existence in all parts of the world, including Africa, India, and Asia
- New Art of the American West (1979), as producer and cinematographer, documentary based on the first WESTAF State Biennial Exhibition organized by WESTAF (the Western States Arts Federation), sponsored by Philip Morris Inc
- Remember Me (1979), documentary depicting children living and working in poverty throughout the world, for the UN Environment Programme, with Dick Cavett as narrator, Oscar nomination for best documentary, short subject, 1980
- It's the Same World (1980), documentary depicting disabled individuals across the globe who seek full participation and equality, Oscar nomination for best documentary, short subject, 1981
- Champions of American Sport (1981), documentary that Introduces the viewer to some of America's great athletes through interviews and action footage, sponsored by Philip Morris Inc
- Especially the Children (1981), documentary that illustrates UNICEF's involvement in supplying basic and emergency services with the assistance of local communities
- Journey for Survival (1981), documentary about international effort to bring safe water to the entire world, Oscar nomination for best documentary, short subject, 1982
- Sanctuary! An African Epic (1983), documentary filmed in the summer of 1982 in Somalia, Sudan, Tanzania, and Zimbabwe, focuses on the efforts made by the various governments concerned to find durable solutions for refugees in Africa
- Fact of Fiction: Herbal Medicine (1984), documentary tracing the history of herbal medicine
- Education for All (1990), documentary about different approaches by different countries to trying and spread literacy, health education, computer training or environmental awareness
- First Person Singular:John Hope Franklin (1979), documentary about the scholar and activist John Hope Franklin, narrated by Charles Kurralt
- The Promise (1998), documentary featuring children whose families received livestock, including Beatrice Biira, Ugandan beneficiary of Heifer International
- Denan (2003), documentary about Ethiopian refugee camps
