= Ordinary People =

1980 film by Robert Redford

- Theatrical release poster
- Directed by: Robert Redford
- Screenplay by: Alvin Sargent
- Based on: Ordinary People by Judith Guest
- Produced by: Ronald L. Schwary
- Starring: Donald Sutherland; Mary Tyler Moore; Judd Hirsch; Timothy Hutton
- Cinematography: John Bailey
- Edited by: Jeff Kanew
- Music by: Marvin Hamlisch
- Production company: Wildwood Enterprises, Inc
- Distributed by: Paramount Pictures
- Release date: September 19, 1980
- Running time: 124 minutes
- Country: United States
- Language: English
- Budget: $6.2 million
- Box office: $90 million

Ordinary People is a 1980 American drama film directed by Robert Redford in his directorial debut. The screenplay by Alvin Sargent is based on the 1976 novel of the same name by Judith Guest. The film follows the disintegration of a wealthy family in Lake Forest, Illinois after one son dies in an accident and the other son attempts to die by suicide. It stars Donald Sutherland, Mary Tyler Moore, Judd Hirsch, and Timothy Hutton.

Released to theaters by Paramount Pictures on September 19, 1980, Ordinary People met commercial and critical success. The film grossed $90 million on a $6.2 million budget. Reviewers praised Redford's direction, Sargent's screenplay, and the performances of the cast. The film was chosen by the National Board of Review as one of the top ten films of 1980, and had six nominations at the 53rd Academy Awards, winning four: Best Picture, Best Director, Best Adapted Screenplay, and Best Supporting Actor for Hutton (the youngest recipient at age 20). In addition, the film won five awards at the 38th Golden Globe Awards: Best Motion Picture – Drama, Best Director, Best Actress (Moore), and Best Supporting Actor and New Star of the Year – Actor (Hutton).

== Plot ==
The Jarretts are an upper-middle-class family in Lake Forest, a wealthy suburb north of Chicago. They are trying to return to normal life after experiencing the accidental drowning of their older teenage son, Buck, and the attempted suicide of their younger and surviving son, Conrad. Conrad has recently returned home after spending four months in a psychiatric hospital. He feels alienated from his family and friends and seeks help from a psychiatrist, Dr. Tyrone Berger, who learns that Conrad was involved in the sailing accident that killed Buck. Conrad is now dealing with post-traumatic stress disorder and is seeking help to cope with his emotions.

Conrad's father, Calvin, attempts to connect with his surviving son and to understand Beth, his wife and Conrad's mother, who denies her grief, hoping to maintain her composure and restore her family to what it once was. She appears to have favored Buck, and has grown cold toward Conrad due to his suicide attempt. Beth is determined to maintain the appearance of perfection and normality, but her efforts only serve to further alienate Conrad. Conrad continues to work with Dr. Berger and begins to learn how to deal with his emotions. He starts dating a fellow student, Jeannine, who helps him regain his optimism and confidence. However, Conrad still struggles to communicate and establish normal relationships with his parents and schoolmates in the shadow of recent events.

Meanwhile, Calvin tries to referee the tension between Beth and Conrad, generally taking Conrad's side for fear of pushing him over the edge again. Tensions escalate before Christmas when Conrad becomes furious with Beth for refusing to take a photo with him, swearing at her in front of his grandparents. Soon after, Beth discovers that Conrad has been lying about his whereabouts after school and has quit the swim team. This leads to a heated confrontation between Conrad and Beth in which Conrad points out that Beth never visited him in the hospital; Conrad argues that if Buck had been hospitalized in his place, she would have gone to see him, to which Beth curtly replies that Buck would never have been in the hospital in the first place.

Beth and Calvin then take a trip to see Beth's brother Ward in Houston, where Calvin presses Beth about her evasive attitude. At home, Conrad suffers a setback when he learns that Karen, a friend from the psychiatric hospital, has taken her own life. A cathartic breakthrough session soon follows in the middle of the night with Dr. Berger who allows Conrad to stop blaming himself for Buck's death and accept his mother's limitations. However, when Conrad tries to show affection after his parents arrive home from Houston, Beth is unresponsive, leading Calvin to emotionally confront her one last time. He questions their love and asks whether she can truly love anyone. Stunned, Beth packs her bags and goes back to Houston. Calvin and Conrad are left to come to terms with their new family situation, affirming their father–son bond, love, and support for one another.

== Cast ==
- Donald Sutherland as Calvin Jarrett
- Mary Tyler Moore as Beth Jarrett
- Judd Hirsch as Tyrone C. Berger
- Timothy Hutton as Conrad Jarrett
- Elizabeth McGovern as Jeannine Pratt
- M. Emmet Walsh as Salan
- Dinah Manoff as Karen Aldrich
- Fredric Lehne as Joe Lazenby
- James B. Sikking as Ray Hanley
- Basil Hoffman as Sloan
- Quinn Redeker as Ward Butler
- Mariclare Costello as Audrey Butler
- Richard Whiting as Howard Butler
- Meg Mundy as Ellen Butler
- Elizabeth Hubbard as Ruth
- Adam Baldwin as Kevin Stillman
- Scott Doebler as Buck Jarrett

=== Casting ===
Gene Hackman was originally cast as Calvin Jarrett but then later dropped out when he and the studio could not come to a financial agreement.

A then-unknown Michael J. Fox, who had just moved to Los Angeles to pursue an acting career, auditioned for the role of Conrad Jarrett but reportedly did not impress Redford, who flossed his teeth during Fox's audition.

Natalie Wood was also considered for the role of Beth.

== Reception ==
=== Box office ===
The film was a box-office success, grossing $54.8 million in the United States and Canada and approximately $36 million overseas for a worldwide gross of $90 million.

=== Critical reception ===
Ordinary People received critical acclaim. On Rotten Tomatoes, the film has an approval rating of 90%, based on 105 reviews, with an average rating of 8.50/10. The site's critical consensus reads, "Robert Redford proves himself a filmmaker of uncommon emotional intelligence with Ordinary People, an auspicious debut that deftly observes the fractioning of a family unit through a quartet of superb performances." Audiences polled by CinemaScore gave the film a rare average grade of "A+" on an A+ to F scale.

Roger Ebert gave it a full four stars and praised how the film's setting "is seen with an understated matter-of-factness. There are no cheap shots against suburban lifestyles or affluence or mannerisms: The problems of the people in this movie aren't caused by their milieu, but grow out of themselves. ... That's what sets the film apart from the sophisticated suburban soap opera it could easily have become." He later named it the fifth best film of the year 1980; while colleague Gene Siskel ranked it the second best film of 1980.

Writing for The New York Times, Vincent Canby called it "a moving, intelligent and funny film about disasters that are commonplace to everyone except the people who experience them."

The film marked a career breakout for Mary Tyler Moore from the personalities of her other two famous roles: Laura Petrie on The Dick Van Dyke Show and Mary Richards on The Mary Tyler Moore Show. Moore's nuanced portrayal of the mother to Hutton's character was highly acclaimed, and earned her a Best Actress nomination. Donald Sutherland's performance as the father was also well received and earned him a Golden Globe nomination. Despite his co-stars receiving nominations, Sutherland was overlooked for an Academy Award, which Entertainment Weekly has described as one of the biggest acting snubs in the history of the awards.

Judd Hirsch's portrayal of Dr. Berger was a departure from his work on the sitcom Taxi, and drew praise from many in the psychiatric community as one of the rare times their profession is shown in a positive light in film. Hirsch was also nominated for Best Supporting Actor, losing out to co-star Hutton. Additionally, Ordinary People launched the career of Elizabeth McGovern who played Hutton's character's love interest, and who received special permission to film while attending Juilliard.

The film's prominent usage of Pachelbel's Canon, which had been relatively obscure for centuries, helped to usher the piece into mainstream popular culture.

In 2025, Pope Leo XIV shared that the film is one of his favorites.

=== Analysis ===
Julia L. Hall, a journalist who has written extensively about narcissistic personality disorder, wrote in 2017 upon Moore's death that she "portrays her character's narcissism to a tee in turn after turn." She praised Moore for taking such a career risk so soon after having played such a memorable and likable character on television, "scaffolding gaping emptiness with a persona of perfection, supported by denial, blame, rejection, and rage."

== Accolades ==
The film was nominated for six Academy Awards (winning four), including the Best Picture, Best Director, Best Adapted Screenplay, and Best Supporting Actor (for Hutton) in his first film role. In 2006, Writers Guild of America West ranked its screenplay 58th in WGA's list of 101 Greatest Screenplays.

Award	Category	Nominee(s)	Result	Ref.
Academy Awards	Best Picture	Ronald L. Schwary	Won	
Academy Awards	Best Director	Robert Redford	Won	
Academy Awards	Best Actress	Mary Tyler Moore	Nominated	
Academy Awards	Best Supporting Actor	Judd Hirsch	Nominated	
Academy Awards	Best Supporting Actor	Timothy Hutton	Won	
Academy Awards	Best Adapted Screenplay	Alvin Sargent	Won	
British Academy Film Awards	Best Actress in a Leading Role	Mary Tyler Moore	Nominated	
British Academy Film Awards	Most Promising Newcomer to Leading Film Roles	Timothy Hutton	Nominated	
Directors Guild of America Awards	Outstanding Directorial Achievement in Motion Pictures	Robert Redford	Won	
Golden Globe Awards	Best Motion Picture – Drama		Won	
Golden Globe Awards	Best Actor in a Motion Picture – Drama	Donald Sutherland	Nominated	
Golden Globe Awards	Best Actress in a Motion Picture – Drama	Mary Tyler Moore	Won	
Golden Globe Awards	Best Supporting Actor – Motion Picture	Judd Hirsch	Nominated	
Golden Globe Awards	Best Supporting Actor – Motion Picture	Timothy Hutton	Won	
Golden Globe Awards	Best Director – Motion Picture	Robert Redford	Won	
Golden Globe Awards	Best Screenplay – Motion Picture	Alvin Sargent	Nominated	
Golden Globe Awards	New Star of the Year – Actor	Timothy Hutton	Won	
Japan Academy Film Prize	Outstanding Foreign Language Film		Nominated	
Kansas City Film Critics Circle Awards	Best Film		Won	
Kansas City Film Critics Circle Awards	Best Director	Robert Redford	Won	
Kansas City Film Critics Circle Awards	Best Supporting Actor	Timothy Hutton	Won	
Los Angeles Film Critics Association Awards	Best Supporting Actor	Timothy Hutton	Won	
Nastro d'Argento	Best Foreign Director	Robert Redford	Nominated	
National Board of Review Awards	Best Film		Won	
National Board of Review Awards	Top Ten Films		Won	
National Board of Review Awards	Best Director	Robert Redford	Won	
National Society of Film Critics Awards	Best Actress	Mary Tyler Moore	2nd Place	
National Society of Film Critics Awards	Best Supporting Actor	Timothy Hutton	2nd Place	
New York Film Critics Circle Awards	Best Film		Won	
New York Film Critics Circle Awards	Best Director	Robert Redford	Runner-up	
New York Film Critics Circle Awards	Best Actress	Mary Tyler Moore	Runner-up	
New York Film Critics Circle Awards	Best Supporting Actor	Timothy Hutton	Runner-up	
Writers Guild of America Awards	Best Drama Adapted from Another Medium	Alvin Sargent	Won	

== Home media ==
Ordinary People was released on DVD in 2001. It was released on Blu-ray in March 2022, featuring a 4K restoration of the film.

== See also ==
- List of directorial debuts
- List of oldest and youngest Academy Award winners and nominees – Youngest winners for Best Actor in a Supporting Role
- Ordinary People (play), a stage version of the novel by Judith Guest
