= The Libertarian Forum =

Defunct anarcho-capitalist magazine

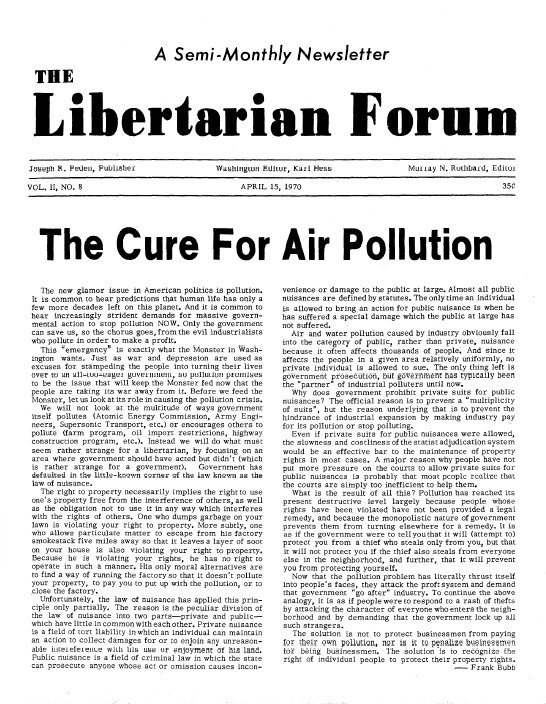

The Libertarian Forum was an anarcho-capitalist magazine published about twice a month from 1969 to 1984. Its editor and chief author was Murray Rothbard; initially, Karl Hess also served as Washington editor. Currently all the issues are available in the book compilation The Complete Libertarian Forum 1969–1984.

== History ==
The Libertarian Forum was created in 1969 after the demise of Left and Right: A Journal of Libertarian Thought to support anarcho-capitalism. The focus of the journal was on "substantive theoretical contributions, commentaries on politics, details of disputes and arguments within the libertarian movement, and forecasts on the future of liberty." The original publisher was Joseph R. Peden.

The Libertarian Forum published several early incarnations of essays that would later be included as chapters in Walter Block's Defending the Undefendable.

== Name change ==
Originally titled The Libertarian, it was renamed The Libertarian Forum with the sixth issue.

According to the journal, "After we had launched The Libertarian, we discovered that a monthly mimeographed periodical with the same name emanating from New Jersey had been publishing for several years. To avoid confusion with this publication, we are hereby changing our name to The Libertarian Forum; no change is involved in policy or format."

== Book ==
In 2006, a two-volume edition, titled The Complete Libertarian Forum 1969–1984, was published (ISBN 1-933550-02-3) by the Ludwig von Mises Institute.

== See also ==
- Anarcho-capitalism
