= It's the Same World =

1980 film

- Produced by: Dick Young
- Production company: Dick Young Productions
- Distributed by: United Nations
- Release date: 1980
- Running time: 20 minutes
- Country: United States
- Language: English

It's the Same World is a 1980 American short documentary film produced by Dick Young. It was nominated for an Academy Award for Best Documentary Short. It was commissioned by the United Nations to raise awareness about people living with disabilities.
