= Karl Hess =

American journalist, writer and libertarian (1923–1994)

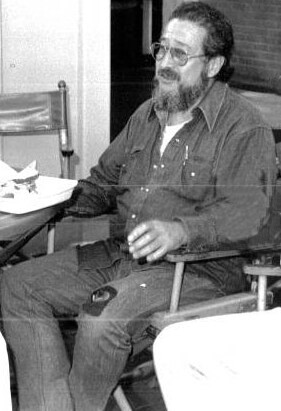
- Hess at The Future of Freedom Conference in 1981
- Born: Carl Hess III; May 25, 1923; Washington, D.C.
- Died: April 22, 1994 (aged 70); Charlottesville, VA
- Occupations: Speechwriter; author; welder
- Years active: 1940–1994
- Employer(s): Mutual Broadcasting System, The Washington Daily News, Newsweek, American Enterprise Institute, The Libertarian Forum
- Political party: Libertarian Party
- Spouse: Therese (second wife)
- Children: Karl Hess, IV

Karl Hess (born Carl Hess III; May 25, 1923 – April 22, 1994) was an American speechwriter and author. He was also a political philosopher, editor, welder, motorcycle racer, tax resister, and libertarian activist. His career included stints on the Republican right and the New Left before embracing a mix of left-libertarianism and laissez-faire anarcho-capitalism, a term which is attested earliest in his 1969 essay "The Death of Politics". Later in life, he summed up his role in the economy by remarking "I am by occupation a free marketer (crafts and ideas, woodworking, welding, and writing)."

== Early life ==
Hess was born in Washington, D.C., and moved to the Philippines as a child. His parents were of German and Spanish ancestry. When his mother discovered his father's marital infidelity, she divorced her wealthy husband and returned (with Karl) to Washington. She refused alimony or child support and took a job as a telephone operator, raising her son in very modest circumstances.

Karl's mother encouraged curiosity and direct learning. She often insisted that Karl figure things out for himself, or increase his knowledge through reading. Karl, believing (as his mother did) that public education was a waste of time, rarely attended school; to evade truancy officers, he registered at every elementary school in town and gradually withdrew from each one, making it impossible for the authorities to know exactly where he was supposed to be. He had developed great reverence for libraries; this became very basic to his personal philosophy, and in his autobiography he wrote: "Literacy is the basic tool in the workshop of the entire world."

As a young person, Karl played tennis, learned marksmanship, and pursued fencing. Later on he learned gunsmithing. He officially dropped out at 15 and went to work for the Mutual Broadcasting System as a newswriter at the invitation of Walter Compton, a Mutual news commentator who resided in the building where Mrs. Hess operated the switchboard. Hess continued to work in the news media, and by age 18 was assistant city editor of The Washington Daily News.

Early during the Second World War, Hess enlisted in the U.S. Army in 1942. He was discharged when they discovered he had contracted malaria in the Philippines.

He was later an editor for Newsweek and The Fisherman. He worked as a staff writer, and sometimes as a freelancer, for a number of anti-Communist periodicals. In the 1950s he worked for the Champion Papers and Fibre Company. He was dismayed that people in the management portion of the corporate world seemed more interested in personal advancement than in doing good work. At Champion his bosses encouraged him to get involved in conservative politics for the company's benefit. In doing so he met Arizona Senator Barry Goldwater and many other prominent Republicans, thus beginning the GOP epoch of his life.

In his book Dear America, Hess wrote that he became an atheist because his temporary job as a coroner's assistant when he was 15 left him convinced that people were simply flesh-and-blood beings with no afterlife. Consequently, he stopped attending church (he had been a devout Roman Catholic). Years later, while on leave from Champion and working for the American Enterprise Institute (AEI), he resumed attending church because virtually all of his AEI colleagues did so. His return merely reinforced his atheism; on one Sunday morning, while enduring a service as his young son sat on his lap, Hess became disgusted with himself for exposing his child to an institution he himself had rejected.

== Political activities ==
Hess was the primary author of the Republican Party's 1960 and 1964 platforms. In the lead-up to the 1964 presidential election, Hess worked closely with Barry Goldwater. He came to view Goldwater as a man of sterling character, a conservative holding libertarian convictions. Hess worked as a speechwriter, and explored ideology and politics. He was widely considered to be the author of the renowned Goldwater line, "Extremism in the defense of liberty is no vice; moderation in the pursuit of justice is no virtue," but revealed that he had encountered it in a letter from Lincoln historian Harry Jaffa and later learned it was a paraphrase of a passage from Cicero. He later called this his "Cold Warrior" phase.

Following the 1964 presidential campaign in which Lyndon Johnson trounced Goldwater, Hess became disillusioned with traditional politics and became more radical. Hess and others on the losing team had found themselves outsiders within the national Republican party because of their support of the controversial Goldwater. Hess felt that he had been purged by the Republicans and he departed from involvement with grand-scale politics altogether.

In 1965 Hess took up motorcycle riding. His need to occasionally repair his motorcycles led to his interest in welding (which he learned at Bell Vocational School, in 1967). Welding skills gave him something he could trade upon. Initially, he set up a commercial partnership, with a fellow Bell graduate, doing on-site industrial welding. Eventually, his skill led to an involvement with welded-metal sculpture.

All of this unfolded around the same time as his divorce from his first wife. Hess hereafter publicly criticized big business, suburban American hypocrisy and the military-industrial complex. Though well beyond college age, Hess joined Students for a Democratic Society, worked with the Black Panther Party and protested the Vietnam War.

After his work on the Goldwater campaign, Hess was audited by the Internal Revenue Service, which he believed was in retaliation for his support of the losing candidate. In response, he sent the IRS a copy of the Declaration of Independence with a letter saying that he would never again pay taxes. Hess claimed that the IRS then threatened to put a lien on all of his property and 100% of his future earnings. He was supported financially thereafter by his wife and used barter to keep himself afloat.

In 1968, Richard Nixon was elected president and Barry Goldwater returned to the Senate as Arizona's junior senator. Hess, despite now being a member of the New Left, had recently written some speeches for Goldwater and resumed their close personal relationship; he had concluded that American men should not be forced into military service and urged Goldwater to submit legislation abolishing conscription. Goldwater replied, "Well, let's wait and see what Dick Nixon wants to do about that one." Hess despised Nixon almost as much as he admired Goldwater and could not tolerate the notion that Goldwater would defer to Nixon. Thus ended one of Hess's closest professional associations, and the situation significantly compromised one of his deepest friendships. (Nixon abolished conscription during his presidency, with Goldwater's support.) Incidentally, both Hess and Nixon would die on the same day, April 22, 1994.

Hess began reading American anarchists largely because of the recommendations of his friend Murray Rothbard. Hess said that upon reading the works of Emma Goldman he discovered that anarchists believed everything he had hoped the Republican Party would represent, and that Goldman was the source for the best and most essential theories of Ayn Rand without any of the "crazy solipsism that Rand was so fond of."

From 1969 to 1971, Hess edited The Libertarian Forum with Rothbard.

Hess had come to put his focus on the small scale, on community. He said, "Society is: people together making culture." He deemed two of his cardinal social principles to be "opposition to central political authority" and "concern for people as individuals." His rejection of standard American party politics was reflected in a lecture he gave during which he said, "The Democrats or liberals think that everybody is stupid and therefore they need somebody... to tell them how to behave themselves. The Republicans think everybody is lazy..."

In 1969 and 1970, Hess joined with others, including Murray Rothbard, Robert LeFevre, Dana Rohrabacher, Samuel Edward Konkin III, and former Students for a Democratic Society (SDS) leader Carl Oglesby to speak at two "left-right" conferences which brought together activists from both the Old Right and the New Left in what was emerging as a nascent libertarian movement.

As part of his effort to unite right and left-libertarianism, Hess would join the SDS as well as the Industrial Workers of the World (IWW), of which he explained, "We used to have a labor movement in this country, until I.W.W. leaders were killed or imprisoned. You could tell labor unions had become captive when business and government began to praise them. They're destroying the militant black leaders the same way now. If the slaughter continues, before long liberals will be asking, 'What happened to the blacks? Why aren't they militant anymore?'"

In the 1980s, Hess joined the Libertarian Party, which had been founded in 1971. He served as editor of its newspaper from 1986 to 1990.

== Adams-Morgan experiment and back-to-the-land ==
Hess was an early proponent of the "back to the land" movement, and his focus on self-reliance and small communities happened in part by government mandate. According to a Libertarian Party News obituary, "When the Internal Revenue Service confiscated all his property and put a 100 percent lien on all of his future earnings, Hess (who had learned welding at Bell Vocational School) existed on bartering his work for food and goods."

Hess's life as a welder put him in rapport with a very large segment of the American population who are manual laborers. He eventually came to the conviction that virtually no one in national politics identified with these people anymore. Hess's revolt against public giantism reflected a distrust toward large-corporate business as well as big government. After Hess had made friends within the New Left and related circles, he began to encounter the young, new-breed appropriate technology enthusiasts (exemplified, by the early 1970s, in the editors and readerships of the Whole Earth Catalog and Mother Earth News). In CoEvolution Quarterly (issue 30, Summer 1980) Hess engaged in a lengthy discussion with Stewart Brand, the creator of the Catalog and editor of the Quarterly.

In the early 1970s, Hess had become involved in an experiment with several friends and colleagues to bring self-built and -managed technology into the direct service of the economic and social life of the (at the time) poor, largely African American neighborhood of Adams-Morgan in Washington, D.C. It was the neighborhood in which Hess had spent his childhood. Afterward, Hess wrote a book entitled Community Technology which told the story of this experiment and its results. According to Hess, the residents had a vigorous go at participatory democracy, and the neighborhood seemed for a time like a fertile ground for the growth of community identity and capability.

Much of the technological experimentation Hess and others engaged in there was successful in technical terms (apparatus was built, food raised, solar energy captured, etc.). For instance, Hess wrote: "In one experiment undertaken by the author and associates, an inner-city basement space, roughly thirty by fifty feet, was sufficient to house plywood tanks in which rainbow trout were produced at a cost of less than a dollar per pound. In a regular production run the total number of fish that can be raised in such a basement area was projected to be five tons per year." He taught courses and lectured on Appropriate Technology and Social Change in this period at the Institute for Social Ecology in Vermont. Nonetheless, the Adams-Morgan neighborhood, continuing on what he felt was a path of social deterioration and real-estate gentrification, declined to devote itself to expanding on the technology. Hence, in his view, a needy community got little value from the application of viable technology.

Subsequently, Hess and his wife, Therese, moved to rural Opequon Creek between Martinsburg and Kearneysville, West Virginia, where he set up a welding shop as partial support for his household. He became deeply involved with local affairs there. Hess built an affordable house that relied largely on passive-solar heating, and took an interest in wind power and all forms of solar energy. The house they built was a 2000 sq. ft. sun-warmed, earth-sheltered structure – constructed mostly using their own labor, and at cost of just $10,000 (mid-1970s dollars). They acquired most of the tools needed for the construction, and the appliances needed for a comfortable modern life, second-hand. By the late 1970s, Hess saw solar energy as emblematic of decentralization and nuclear energy as emblematic of central organization.

Hess wrote for a survivalist newsletter titled Personal Survival ("P.S.") Letter, which was published from 1977 to 1982. It was first published and edited by Mel Tappan. In the same time period, Hess authored the book A Common Sense Strategy for Survivalists.

Hess ran a symbolic campaign for Governor of West Virginia in 1992. When asked by a reporter what his first act would be if elected, he quipped, "I will demand an immediate recount", which echoed the same response given in 1965 when William F. Buckley Jr. announced his candidacy for mayor of New York.

== Legacy ==
In a Reuters op-ed piece, in 2012, New Yorker Maureen Tkacik asserted that Karl Hess was the ideological grandfather of the anti-1% movement – making Hess the direct antecedent of thinkers like Ron Paul and both the Tea Party movement and the Occupy movement. She cites the detailed argument Hess, in his libertarian phase, put forward in his book Dear America to delineate and decry the extreme concentration of power in the hands of a tiny financial and stock-holding elite. Tkacik quotes passages from Hess's book to offer proof that Hess developed the language of the 1% versus the 99% (the former being those whose role, according to Hess, is demonstrably detrimental to the vast majority of Americans).

== Bibliography ==
Articles

- "The Lawless State: A Libertarian View of the Status of Liberty". National Issues Series of Politics. Constitutional Alliance. Vol. 4, No. 4 (1969)
- "Desperate Character" (1976)

Books

- In a Cause That Will Triumph: The Goldwater Campaign and the Future of Conservatism (1967) OCLC 639505
- The End of the Draft: The Feasibility of Freedom (with Thomas Reeves) (1970) ISBN 0394708709
- Dear America (1975) (autobiography/anarchist manifesto) ISBN 0688028985
- Neighborhood Power: The New Localism (with David Morris) (1975) ISBN 0807008753
- Community Technology (1979) ISBN 1559501340
- A Common Sense Strategy for Survivalists (1981) OCLC 9625419
- Three Interviews (1981) OCLC 9663274
- Capitalism for Kids (1986) ISBN 0942103068
- Mostly on the Edge: An Autobiography (edited by Karl Hess, Jr.) (1999) ISBN 1573926876

Book reviews

- "Review of The Fabulous Insects, edited by Charles Neider". The Freeman, May 17, 1954. (p. 607)

== Films ==
Karl Hess: Toward Liberty is a documentary film which won the Academy Award for best short documentary in 1981, after having previously won a Student Academy Award. Another documentary prominently featuring Hess is the 1983 film Anarchism in America.
