= Sandy Smolan =

American director

Sandy Smolan is an American feature film, television, and documentary film director.

== Early career ==
Smolan's debut feature film Rachel River was nominated for the Grand Jury Prize at the Sundance Film Festival and took awards for Best Cinematography and a Special Jury Prize for actress Viveca Lindfors.

Smolan began his career directing documentaries. He directed The Maghreb Journals, when he was 20, shot over five months in Algeria, Tunisia and Morocco. He worked with Morley Safer and Charles Kuralt on two specials for CBS News and worked with Jim Brown on the feature release of The Weavers: Wasn't That A Time. He produced numerous programs for PBS, including several award-winning shorts, several of the Day In The Life series of documentaries and the political themed Sanctuary.

He was nominated for Best Director for the Emmy Award-winning Taking A Stand for ABC with Betty Buckley. His television movies include The Last Soldier for HBO, the mini-series Beach Girls with Rob Lowe and Julia Ormond for Lifetime, and A Place To Be for CBS. He directed the acclaimed pilot for the CBS series Middle Ages and had directed over fifty network and cable episodic series, beginning with L.A. Law and continuing with dozens of other prime-time dramas including Northern Exposure, Brooklyn Bridge, Picket Fences, Ally McBeal, The District, Ed, Dawson's Creek, Everwood, Chicago Hope, The OC and Brothers and Sisters.

Smolan's documentary 12 Stones, about the transformation of a group of illiterate women in southern Nepal won the Jury Prize for Best Short Documentary at the Tallahassee and Newport Beach Film Festivals. He has also produced and directed many other documentaries, including films for The Bill and Melinda Gates foundation, HP, Cisco, Intel and SAP.

His most recent documentary, The Human Face of Big Data, won the Jury Prize for Best Cinematography at The Boston International Film Festival and was selected to be part of the American Film Showcase, the major film diplomacy program of U.S. Department of State.

== Personal life ==
Smolan met Pamela Reed when directing Rachel River. They married in 1988 and have two adoptive children, Reed and Lily.

== Directing credits ==
- Descending from Heaven
- The Middleman
- Men in Trees
- Eli Stone
- October Road (2 episodes, 2007-2008)
- Brothers & Sisters (2 episodes, 2007)
- Three Moons Over Milford
- Beach Girls
- Everwood (5 episodes, 2003-2005)
- The Mountain (2 episodes, 2004)
- The O.C. (2 episodes, 2004)
- One Tree Hill
- Miss Match
- Ed
- Diagnosis Murder (2 episodes, 2000-2001)
- The District
- The Huntress
- Dawson's Creek
- Jack & Jill
- Ally
- Now and Again
- Beggars and Choosers (3 episodes, 1999)
- Wasteland (2 episodes, 1999)
- Legacy
- Sins of the City
- Love Boat: The Next Wave
- Ally McBeal (2 episodes, 1997-1998)
- Dellaventura
- Weird Science
- Second Noah
- Dangerous Minds
- Picket Fences
- Earth 2
- Chicago Hope
- A Place to Be Loved
- Class of '96
- Middle Ages
- The Heights
- Northern Exposure (3 episodes, 1990-1991)
- Sisters (2 episodes, 1991)
- Brooklyn Bridge (1991) TV series (unknown episodes)
- Eddie Dodd (1991) TV series (unknown episodes)
- Doogie Howser, M.D. (2 episodes, 1989-1991)
- Equal Justice (1990) TV series (unknown episodes)
- L.A. Law (3 episodes, 1989)
- Life Goes On (1989) TV series (unknown episodes)
- ABC Afterschool Special ("Taking a Stand")
- Vietnam War Story: The Last Days - The Last Soldier
- Rachel River
- A Day in the Life of Hawaii
