= Remember Me (1979 film) =

1979 film

- Produced by: Dick Young
- Narrated by: Dick Cavett
- Production companies: Dick Young Productions; UNICEF; UNEP
- Distributed by: Dick Young Productions
- Release date: 1979
- Country: United States
- Language: English

Remember Me is a 1979 American short documentary film produced by Dick Young, that was filmed in the US, the Middle East and Asia. It was nominated for an Academy Award for Best Documentary Short.

== Summary ==
Documenting and contrasting children's youthful beauty with the squalor, hardship and wasted potential of their daily lives; students learning how their counterparts really live and are encouraged to think about what these children need to thrive.
