= Second Heaven =

1983 novel by Judith Guest

First edition (publ. Viking Press)

Second Heaven is a novel written by Judith Guest, published in 1983. ISBN 0-451-12499-5 ISBN 0670628301
