= Killing Time in St. Cloud =

1988 novel by Judith Guest and Rebecca Hill

- First edition
- Author: Judith Guest and Rebecca Hill
- Language: English
- Genre: Crime
- Publisher: Delacorte Press
- Publication date: 1 October 1988
- Publication place: United States
- Media type: Print (hardback)
- Pages: 300 pp.
- ISBN: 0-440-50069-9
- OCLC: 17954339
- Dewey Decimal: 813/.54 19
- LC Class: PS3557.U345 K55 1988

Killing Time in St. Cloud is a crime novel by Judith Guest and Rebecca Hill published in 1988.

== Synopsis ==
After returning to St. Cloud a man becomes involved in a complicated web of lies, feuds, and secrets that leads to murder.

== Development ==
Judith Guest and Rebecca Hill began writing Killing Time in St. Cloud around 1985, choosing to pick a genre in which neither had previously written. They chose to write together, partially to deal with the isolation felt while writing by oneself, but also because they held "similar values and orientation towards experience". Each author wrote alternating chapters and they both chose to include several narrators in the novel. It took them 2 and a half years to complete the novel and both stated that they found the process fun, but found setting up the novel challenging.

== Release ==
Killing Time in St. Cloud was released in hardback on October 1, 1988 in the United States, through Delacorte Press, followed by a mass market paperback the following year from the same publisher. A paperback edition was released in the United Kingdom by Penguin in 1990.

== Reception ==
Critical reception for Killing Time in St. Cloud was mixed. Joyce Slater of The Atlanta Constitution criticized the novel, stating that "Ms. Guest and Ms. Hill apparently intended to combine elements of the traditional novel and the formula mystery, then ended up with something that is neither. "Killing Time in St. Cloud" lacks the richness of characterization necessary for the second." A reviewer for the Daily Press was similarly critical, criticizing the "aimless, trite dialogue and stock, one-dimensional characters".

Michael Dorris of the Chicago Tribune was more favorable, describing it as a "first-rate, beautifully written novel." The Star Press's Bill Spurgeon was also positive, praising the novel for its characters and plotting.

== Adaptation plans ==
Shortly after the release of the novel in 1988 Guest and Hill announced that film rights to the novel were purchased by David Geffen and Co. They voiced their support for the movie to be filmed in St. Cloud and also stated that they wished to write the screenplay themselves.
