= Fall Line (film) =

1980 film

- Directed by: Greg Lowe, Robert Carmichael
- Starring: Steve Shea
- Narrated by: Ron Hayes
- Edited by: Tim Huntley
- Distributed by: Pyramid Films
- Release date: 1980
- Running time: 12 minutes
- Country: United States
- Language: English

Fall Line is a 1980 American short film directed by Greg Lowe and Robert Carmichael. The film depicts skier Steve Shea skiing down the Grand Teton.

== Cast ==
- Steve Shea

== Reception ==
In 1981, Fall Line was nominated for an Oscar for Best Short Subject at the 53rd Academy Awards.
