= Ordinary People (Guest novel) =

1976 Judith Guest novel

- First edition hardback
- Author: Judith Guest
- Cover artist: James Zar
- Language: English
- Genre: Psychological novel
- Publisher: Viking Press
- Publication date: July 1976
- Publication place: United States
- Media type: Print (hardback & paperback)
- Pages: 245 pp. (first edition, hardback)
- ISBN: 0-670-52831-5 (first edition, hardback), ISBN 0-14-006517-2.
- OCLC: 2020624
- Dewey Decimal: 813/.5/4
- LC Class: PS3557.U345

Ordinary People is Judith Guest's first novel. Published in 1976, it tells the story of a year in the life of the Jarretts, an affluent suburban family trying to cope with the aftermath of two traumatic events.

Although it won critical praise and awards upon its release, it is best remembered today as the basis for the 1980 film version, which won four Academy Awards including Best Picture. The novel received the 1976 Janet Heidinger Kafka Prize and is also assigned in many American secondary school English classes.

== Title ==
They are ordinary people, after all. For a time they had entered the world of the newspaper statistic; a world where any measure you took to feel better was temporary, at best, but that is over. This is permanent. It must be.

== Synopsis ==
Life is seemingly returning to normal for the Jarretts of Lake Forest, Illinois (a suburb of Chicago) in September 1975. It is slightly more than a year since their elder son Buck was killed when a sudden storm arrived while he and his brother Conrad were sailing on Lake Michigan. Six months later, a severely depressed Conrad attempted suicide by slashing his wrists with a razor in the bathroom. His parents committed him to a psychiatric hospital from which he has only recently returned after eight months of treatment. He is attending school and trying to resume his life, but he recognizes he still has unresolved issues, particularly with his mother, Beth, who has never really recovered from Buck's death and keeps an almost maniacally perfect household and family.

His father Calvin is a successful tax attorney who gently leans on Conrad to make appointments to see a local psychiatrist, Dr. Tyrone C. Berger. Initially resistant, he slowly starts to respond to Dr. Berger and comes to terms with the root cause of his depression, his identity crisis and survivor's guilt. Also helping is a relationship with a new girlfriend, Jeannine Pratt.

Calvin sees Dr. Berger as the events of the recent past have caused him to begin to doubt many things he once took for granted, leading to a midlife crisis. This leads to strain in his marriage as he finds Beth increasingly cold and distant, while she in turn believes he is overly concerned about Conrad to the point of being manipulated. This friction becomes enough that Beth decides to leave him. Father and son, however, have closed the gap between them.

== Characters ==
- Conrad Keith Jarrett, the son of Beth and Calvin, "Con" or "Connie" to his family and friends. He celebrates his 18th birthday midway through the novel. Like his late brother, he is a good swimmer, but quits the school swim team because being around water reminds him too much of Buck. He had always been somewhat overshadowed by his brother. He has passive tendencies as well.
- Calvin Jarrett, 41, "Cal". His professional success has enabled him to provide a very comfortable life to his wife and sons, which for a long time was a source of great pride to him as he had himself grown up in a Detroit orphanage without ever knowing his father. His mother died when he was eleven. He has long felt lucky, but the family's recent travails have caused him to begin to doubt that and wonder who he really is.
- Beth Jarrett, 39. A homemaker who has long kept the Jarrett household neat and well-organized, to the point of being anal retentive. She plays golf and is very active in the community. The novel gives little detail of her personal background, but her still-living parents provide some clues as to how she might have become this way.
- Dr. Tyrone C. Berger, the psychiatrist who helps Conrad work through his issues.
- Jeannine Pratt, a new student at Lake Forest who eventually becomes Conrad's girlfriend. Like him, she has a dark episode in her recent past.
- Joe Lazenby, one of Conrad's friends, who drives him to school. Alone among the swimmers, he recognizes that Conrad is still having difficulties. Conrad and he have a falling out during the novel, but they manage to mend their relationship towards the end.
- Kevin Stillman, A member of Lazenby's carpool and the swim team's diver, a group of people Conrad has long concluded are generally lousy human beings. He can be very insensitive, and not just to Conrad (he is known to make suggestive comments to passing girls). One day after Conrad has quit the team, he and Conrad get into a fist fight which Conrad wins.
- Carole Lazenby, Joe Lazenby's mother, and a friend of Beth Jarrett.
- Ray Hanley, Calvin's law partner and longtime friend. Calvin had consoled Ray seven years earlier during a time when his wife Nancy had left him over an extramarital affair he was having; now Ray returns the favor.
- Nancy Hanley, Ray's wife, very disillusioned about marriage even though she took her husband back and seems to be continuing to live with him. At one point she tells Calvin she wishes Ray had just stayed with his girlfriend.
- Cherry, 19, Ray and Calvin's current secretary. Calvin does not think her competent at her job despite her pleasant personality, and he and Ray both lament the lack of talent once available to them. Her breakup with her boyfriend leads Calvin to ruminate about how "people are like icebergs ... only one-seventh visible".
- Howard, Beth's father. Very jovial, he often speaks in clichés.
- Ellen, Beth's mother. Her outward cordiality masks critical tendencies similar to her daughter. At one point Calvin speculates that Beth's fastidiousness may be a response to Ellen's personality.
- Karen Susan Aldrich, a fellow patient at the hospital and friend to Conrad. Released three months before him, she had likewise made a nonfatal suicide attempt. When Conrad reads of her later suicide in the newspaper, he is devastated as he had seen her as a role model for his own successful recovery.
- Mr. Faughnan, the choir director at Lake Forest. He is a perfectionist who cares only that his choir perform well, and does not take a personal interest in any of its members. This allows Conrad to relax in the class.
- Coach Salan, the swimming coach at Lake Forest. While he allows Conrad two days a week off to see Dr. Berger and stays late with him to work out on the other days, Conrad does not like him. He only begrudgingly allowed Conrad to rejoin the team, and once told Conrad that a friend of his with similar problems had "been in and out of institutions his entire life". When Dr. Berger says that remark may have been simply a sign that he didn't know what else to say, Conrad responds that it was simply "stupid".

Three other characters do not appear in the story directly but have a strong effect on it nonetheless, recalled extensively by Conrad and Calvin:

- Jordan "Buck" Jarrett, the son who died in the sailing accident. Conrad and Calvin's memories depict Buck as a daredevil but also something of a natural leader, and a son any family would have liked to have.
- Dr. Leo Crawford, Conrad's psychiatrist at the mental institution. Conrad trusted him as the only doctor who really understood him, and he refers Conrad to Berger.
- Arnold Bacon, Calvin's mentor and father figure in college and law school, died a few years before the story starts. He and Cal had stopped talking while he was still a student because he disapproved of law students marrying and he felt Beth was "not a sharer" (Beth in turn felt Bacon was trying to "own" Cal).

== Major themes ==
Loss and the different ways people deal with it are a major theme of Ordinary People. Conrad loses not only his brother but a good portion of his then-self when Buck dies. His father finds himself re-examining his life and seeing it more the result of random chance and accident than any ability on his part. Beth tries to control it like everything else in her life. She and Conrad were, Calvin notes, the only people not to cry at Buck's funeral.

== Technique ==
Guest's chapters alternate between Conrad and Calvin, in third person limited omniscient narration entirely in the present tense. Readers are privy to their thoughts but not those of the other characters in the scene, not even Cal or Conrad if they happen to intrude. The narrative frequently goes into patches of italicized interior monologue and stream of consciousness.

The novel also circles around both the accident that killed Buck and Conrad's suicide attempt. In the initial chapters they are both only referenced or discussed in the most general terms; later on we learn more details and finally get brief flashbacks from Conrad.

== History ==
=== Origin ===
Guest began Ordinary People as a short story, but found herself writing more and more as she explored the characters in greater depth, wanting to know more about their backgrounds. "Before I knew it," she says "I was 200 pages in". It took her three years to write, after she gave up her teaching job and decided to concentrate on actually finishing a novel.

It became focused on the psychology of the characters, particularly Conrad.

I wanted to explore the anatomy of depression—how it works and why it happens to people; how you can go from being down but able to handle it, to being so down that you don’t even want to handle it, and then taking a radical step with your life—trying to commit suicide—and failing at that, coming back to the world and having to "act normal" when, in fact, you have been forever changed.

=== Publication ===
Guest did not have an agent initially. The first publisher she sent it to, Ballantine Books, rejected it. The second sent a rejection letter that read in part: "While the book has some satiric bite, overall the level of writing does not sustain interest and we will have to decline it." An editor at Viking Press bought the manuscript, but the company waited eight months before putting it out, the first time in 26 years it had published an unsolicited manuscript.

In 1976, it won the Janet Heidinger Kafka Prize for best first novel. 90,000 copies were sold in hardback; Robert Redford, who eventually directed the film, acquired the rights before publication (actually traveling to Guest's suburban Minnesota home to do so). Since 1976, half a million copies of the paperback have been sold.

=== Legacy ===
In the wake of the film version, the novel has been assigned in many American high school (and sometimes middle school) English classes due to its young-adult protagonist. This has led to some challenges to its inclusion on reading lists and curricula due to not only the subject matter but a short scene near the end of the novel in which Conrad and Jeannine make love. The American Library Association ranked it 59th on its list of the 100 most frequently challenged books in school libraries during the 1990s.

== References to other works ==
- At the beginning of the novel, Conrad is reading Jude the Obscure (in which Jude attempts suicide, Jude's mother has died by suicide, and Jude's son commits murder-suicide) in English class. Later, he reads an exam question that mentions Lord Jim and Of Human Bondage as other works he might have read.
- Calvin recalls having enjoyed The Three Musketeers as a young man.
- Karen's drama club is doing A Thousand Clowns.
- During one of his therapy sessions, Conrad mentions his comparison of himself to John Boy from The Waltons.

== Adaptations ==
Robert Redford bought the rights to Guest's manuscript before it was published, intending not to act in it but make his directorial debut with the film. Ordinary People was released in 1980, winning that year's Academy Award for Best Picture. Redford and Timothy Hutton also received Oscars for directing and acting, respectively. It also won the Best Adapted Screenplay award, written by Alvin Sargent.

A play of the same name was published in 1983, in an adaptation by Nancy Pahl-Gilsenan.
