= Judith Guest =

American novelist and screenwriter (born 1936)

- Born: March 29, 1936 (age 90); Detroit, Michigan, U.S.
- Education: University of Michigan (BA)
- Occupation: Novelist
- Writing career
- Period: 1976–present
- Genres: Literary fiction, mystery
- Website: web.archive.org/web/20060617044825/http://judithguest.com/bio.htm

Judith Guest (born March 29, 1936) is an American novelist and screenwriter. She was born in Detroit, Michigan and is the great-niece of Poet Laureate Edgar Guest (1881–1959). She is a recipient of the Janet Heidinger Kafka Prize.

== Early life ==
Guest attended Detroit's Mumford High School in 1951. When her family moved to Royal Oak, she transferred to Royal Oak High School; she graduated in 1954. Guest then studied English and psychology at the University of Michigan. She was also a member of Sigma Kappa sorority. Guest graduated with a BA in education.

== Career ==
Guest taught at a public school for several years before deciding to work full-time completing a novel.

Guest's first book, Ordinary People, published in 1976, was the basis of the 1980 film Ordinary People that won the Academy Award for Best Picture. This novel and two others, Second Heaven (1982) and Errands (1997), are about adolescents forced to deal with crises in their families. Guest also wrote the screenplay for the 1987 film Rachel River.

Guest co-authored the mystery Killing Time in St. Cloud (1988) with novelist Rebecca Hill. Guest's most recent book, The Tarnished Eye (2004), is loosely based on a real unsolved crime in her native Michigan.

== Personal life ==
Guest was married for nearly 50 years to her college sweetheart, businessman Larry LaVercombe (1936-2009). Guest, her three sons, and their families, reside in Edina, Minnesota.

== Bibliography ==
- Ordinary People (1976)
- Second Heaven (1982)
- Killing Time in St. Cloud (with Rebecca Hill) (1988)
- The Mythic Family (essay) (1988)
- Errands (1997)
- The Tarnished Eye (2004)
