= 23rd Writers Guild of America Awards =

23rd WGA Awards
- Date: 1971
- Organized by: Writers Guild of America, East and the Writers Guild of America, West

The 23rd Writers Guild of America Awards honored the best film writers and television writers of 1970. Winners were announced in 1971.

== Winners and nominees ==
=== Film ===
Winners are listed first highlighted in boldface.

**Best Drama Written Directly for the Screen**: **Patton, Written by Francis Ford Coppola and Edmund H. North**; Five Easy Pieces, Written by Carole Eastman; Story by Bob Rafelson and Carole Eastman; Love Story, Written by Erich Segal	**Best Comedy Written Directly for the Screen**: **The Out of Towners, Written by Neil Simon**; The Private Life of Sherlock Holmes, Written by Billy Wilder and I.A.L. Diamond; Quackser Fortune Has a Cousin in the Bronx, Written by Gabriel Walsh; Start the Revolution Without Me, Written by Fred Freeman and Lawrence J. Cohen; The Cheyenne Social Club, Written by James Lee Barrett
**Best Drama Adapted from Another Medium**: **I Never Sang for My Father, Screenplay by Robert Anderson; Based on "I Never Sang for My Father" by him**; Airport, Screenplay by George Seaton; Based on the novel by Arthur Hailey; Catch-22, Screenplay by Buck Henry; Based on the novel by Joseph Heller; Little Big Man, Screenplay by Calder Willingham; Based on the novel by Thomas Berger; The Great White Hope, Screenplay by Howard Sackler; Based on the play by Howard Sackler	**Best Comedy Adapted from Another Medium**: **MASH, Screenplay by Ring Lardner Jr.; Based on the novel by Richard Hooker**; Lovers and Other Strangers, Screenplay by Renée Taylor, Joseph Bologna and David Zelag Goodman; Based on the play by Joseph Bologna and Renée Taylor; The Owl and the Pussycat, Screenplay by Buck Henry; Based on the play by Bill Manhoff; The Twelve Chairs, Screenplay by Mel Brooks; Based on the novel by Ilya Ilf and Yevgeni Petro; Where's Poppa?, Screenplay by Robert Klane; Based on his novel

=== Television ===
**Episodic Comedy**: **"The Valediciton" – Room 222 (ABC) – Richard de Roy**; "The Fourth Estate" – My World and Welcome to It (NBC) – Lila Garrett and Bernie Kahn; "Funny Money" – Room 222 (ABC) – Steven Pritzker; "Check the check" – The Governor & JJ (CBS) – Arne Sultan and Earl Barret	**Episodic Drama**: **"A Continual Roar of Musketry: Part 1 & 2" – The Bold Ones: The Senator (NBC) – David W. Rintels**; "Meanwhile Back at the Studio" – Bracken's World (NBC) – Joseph Bonaduce; "Infinity" – Bracken's World (NBC) – Cliff Gould; "Trouble in Mind" – Hawaii Five-O (CBS) – Mel Goldberg and Sasha Gilien; "The Glass Prison" – The Young Lawyers (ABC) – John W. Bloch

=== Special awards ===
Laurel Award for Screenwriting Achievement

**James Poe**

Valentine Davies Award

**Daniel Taradash**

Morgan Cox Award

**Leonard Spigelgass**

Edmund J North Award

**Lamar Trotti**
