= Bobby Alto =

American actor, comedian and performer

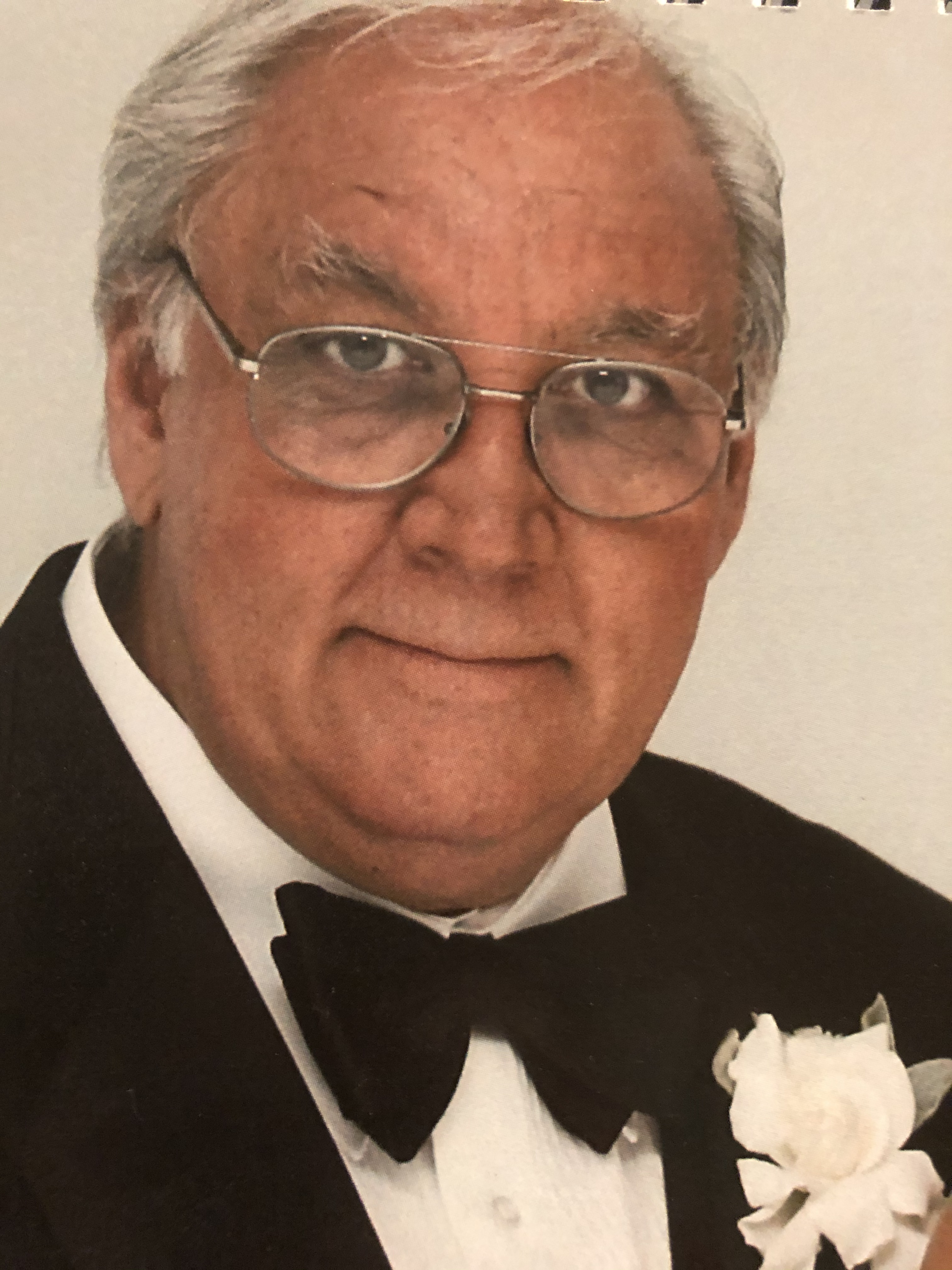
- Born: Robert Altomare; October 30, 1938; Brooklyn, New York, U.S.
- Died: April 28, 2012 (aged 73)
- Occupation: Actor
- Years active: 1968–2006
- Spouse: Melody

Robert Altomare (October 30, 1938 – April 28, 2012), known professionally as Bobby Alto, was an American actor, comedian and performer. He and Buddy Mantia made up the Brooklyn-based comedy team Alto & Mantia. They performed on both The Tonight Show Starring Johnny Carson (original air date September 6, 1971) and Toast of the Town with Ed Sullivan (original air date October 20, 1968). Alto and Mantia also teamed with Marvin Braverman as the comedy team The Untouchables.

== Career ==
Alto's motion picture credits included Love Is All There Is (1996), Crocodile Dundee (1986), Prince of the City (1981) and The Death Collector (1976). He also appeared in a 1992 episode of NBC's Law & Order and several television commercials throughout his career. On Broadway, Alto was a lead performer in the 1992 production of 3 From Brooklyn which performed at the Helen Hayes Theatre in New York City. He also starred in the original Broadway production of Lovers and Other Strangers, which led to the 1970 Academy Award-nominated film of the same name.

Along with comedy partner Buddy Mantia, Alto was the lead vocalist on the song "It's a Super-Spectacular Day", recorded in 1980. The song was originally aired on The Dr. Demento Show prior to being picked up and distributed as a 7" single by MAD Magazine.

== Death ==
Robert Altomare died on April 28, 2012, following complications from a stroke suffered in 2010. He is survived by his wife, Melody, and two daughters, Ivy and Kimberly.

== Filmography ==
=== Film ===
Year	Title	Role	Notes
1971	Made for Each Other	Al	
1976	The Death Collector	Sergio "Serge"	
1981	Prince of the City	Mr. Kanter	
1986	Crocodile Dundee	"Pug Nose"	
1996	Love Is All There Is	Joe Fasuli	
2006	The Last Request	Dr. Davis	Final film role

=== Television ===
Year	Title	Role	Notes
1977	Good Penny	Herb	TV movie
1981	The Edge of Night	Larry	Episode: "Episode #1.6559"
1982	Baker's Dozen	Collins	Episode: "What a Difference a Cop Makes"
1992	Law & Order	Desk Sergeant	Episode: "The Working Stuff"
