= 6th AARP Movies for Grownups Awards =

Film award ceremony

- Date: February 6, 2007

Highlights
- Most nominations: Aurora Borealis, Flags of Our Fathers/Letters from Iwo Jima, The Queen (4)

The 6th AARP Movies for Grownups Awards, presented by AARP the Magazine, honored films released in 2006 made by people over the age of 50. The ceremony was held at the Hotel Bel-Air in Los Angeles on February 6, 2007. Alan Arkin won the inaugural Career Achievement Award, and Terry Bradshaw won the award for Breakaway Accomplishment for his performance in Failure to Launch.

This was the first year to feature five nominees in the Best Actress category, and the last year in which candidates were not nominated for Supporting Actor or Supporting Actress.

== Awards ==
=== Winners and Nominees ===
Winners are listed first, highlighted in boldface, and indicated with a double dagger (‡).

**Best Movie for Grownups**: **The Last King of Scotland**‡; Aurora Borealis; Flags of Our Fathers and Letters from Iwo Jima; Little Miss Sunshine; The Queen	**Best Director**: **Clint Eastwood – Flags of Our Fathers and Letters from Iwo Jima**‡; Bill Condon - Dreamgirls; Stephen Frears - The Queen; Paul Greengrass - United 93; Martin Scorsese - The Departed
**Best Actor**: **Donald Sutherland - Aurora Borealis**‡; Gabriel Byrne - Wah-Wah; Samuel L. Jackson - Freedomland; Jack Nicholson - The Departed; Peter O'Toole - Venus	**Best Actress**: **Helen Mirren - The Queen**‡; Judi Dench - Notes on a Scandal; Catherine O'Hara - For Your Consideration; Maggie Smith - Keeping Mum; Meryl Streep - The Devil Wears Prada
**Best Comedy for Grownups**: **Little Miss Sunshine**‡; Failure to Launch; For Your Consideration; Keeping Mum; Thank You for Smoking	**Best Screenwriter**: **William Broyles Jr. and Paul Haggis - Flags of Our Fathers**‡; Susan Seidelman, David Cramer, and Florence Seidelman - Boynton Beach Club; Christopher Guest and Eugene Levy - For Your Consideration; Richard Russo - Keeping Mum; Shawn Slovo - Catch a Fire
**Best Time Capsule**: **Hollywoodland**‡; Bobby; Flags of Our Fathers; Glory Road; The Queen	**Best Intergenerational Film**: **Akeelah and the Bee**‡; Aurora Borealis; Brooklyn Lobster; Little Miss Sunshine; Quinceañera
**Best Grownup Love Story**: **Blythe Danner and Tom Wilkinson - The Last Kiss**‡; Louise Fletcher and Donald Sutherland - Aurora Borealis; Sally Kellerman and Len Cariou - Boynton Beach Club; Kristin Scott Thomas and Rowan Atkinson - Keeping Mum; Naomi Watts and Edward Norton - The Painted Veil	**Best Movie for Grownups Who Refuse to Grow Up**: **Lassie**‡; Charlotte's Web; Nacho Libre; Nanny McPhee; Night at the Museum
**Best Documentary**: **51 Birch Street**‡; 49 Up; An Inconvenient Truth; Mr. Conservative: Goldwater on Goldwater; Wordplay	**Best Foreign Film**: **The Lives of Others - Germany**‡; The Young Lieutenant - France; The Syrian Bride - Israel; Volver - Spain; Water - India

=== Career Achievement Award ===
- Alan Arkin

=== Breakaway Accomplishment ===
- Terry Bradshaw: "The Hall of Fame quarterback and Fox NFL Sunday host comes awfully close [to stardom] in this, his first major film role... He's riotously exasperated as a dad with a stay-at-home son — but the real eyeopener is the tenderness of his performance with the wonderful Kathy Bates as his wife."

=== Films with multiple nominations and wins ===
Films that received multiple nominations
Nominations	Film
4	Aurora Borealis
4	Flags of Our Fathers/Letters from Iwo Jima
4	The Queen
3	For Your Consideration
3	Keeping Mum
3	Little Miss Sunshine
2	Boynton Beach Club
2	The Departed

Films that received multiple awards
Wins	Film
2	Flags of Our Fathers/Letters from Iwo Jima
