= With Honors =

With Honors may refer to:

- With Honors (film), a 1994 comedy-drama starring Joe Pesci and Brendan Fraser
- With Honours degree, consecutive Hono(u)rs / with Honours or Baccalaureatus Cum Honore academic degree
- Honors student, a student recognized for achieving high grades or high marks in their course work
- Latin honors, an academic distinction at graduation: cum laude, magna cum laude, summa cum laude
