= What Now, Catherine Curtis? =

- Written by: Sheldon Keller; Lynn Roth
- Directed by: Charles Walters
- Starring: Lucille Ball; Joseph Bologna; Art Carney
- Music by: Nelson Riddle
- Country of origin: United States
- Original language: English

Production
- Producer: Gary Morton
- Editor: John Foley
- Running time: 52 minutes

Original release
- Release: March 30, 1976

What Now, Catherine Curtis? is a 1976 American television film directed by Charles Walters and starring Lucille Ball as Catherine Curtis, a middle-aged divorcee who holds on to life after a break in 23 years of marriage. It is broken down into three parts, titled "First Night," "First Affair" and "First Love."

== Cast ==
- Lucille Ball as Catherine Curtis
- Joseph Bologna as Peter
- Art Carney as Mr. Slaney

== Public reception ==
The special was the #16 show for the week and won its timeslot with a 22.6 rating and 36% share of the audience.
