= Claudia Haro =

American actress

- Born: Claudia Martha Haro
- Occupation: Actress
- Criminal charges: Two counts of attempted murder Principal firearm charge
- Criminal penalty: 12 years and four months
- Spouse(s): Joe Pesci (m. 1988; div. 1992) Garrett Warren (m. 1998; div. 2000)
- Children: 2

Claudia Martha Haro is an American former actress and convicted attempted murderer. Her screen roles were all in films with ex-husband Joe Pesci: as the newscaster in Jimmy Hollywood (1994), Marty in With Honors (1994), Trudy in Casino (1995), and Julie in Gone Fishin' (1997), with the exception of playing a receptionist in New Line Cinema's Wes Craven's New Nightmare (1994).

In 2012, Haro was sentenced to 12 years and four months in prison for her involvement in the 2000 attempted murder of her ex-husband, stuntman Garrett Warren. She was paroled in August 2019.

== Personal life ==
Haro was married to Joe Pesci from 1988 to 1992, after they met in 1981 while Haro was modeling. The couple had one child, a daughter named Tiffany. Haro had another daughter with her second husband, Garrett Warren, to whom she was married from 1998 to 2000.

== Attempted murder of Garrett Warren ==
In 2000, Haro filed for divorce from her second husband, Garrett Warren, agreeing to joint custody of their daughter. On May 20, 2000, a hitman named Jorge Hernandez arrived at the front door of Warren's Westlake Village apartment complaining about the way Warren had parked his gray Volvo. When Warren opened his front door Hernandez fired six rounds from a .32 caliber handgun. Warren was struck four times, in the chest, neck, left hip, and right eye. His elderly mother narrowly avoided the two rounds fired at her by the fleeing Hernandez. Warren survived the attack, but lost sight in his right eye.

When asked by homicide detectives whether he had any suspects in mind, Warren said that he was absolutely certain Haro was responsible for his attempted murder. Nevertheless, Haro's alibi convinced police that she was not involved and detectives told Warren they no longer considered her a suspect. The case went cold for several years. Then the discovery of an envelope, beneath the spare tire in suspected drug dealer Miguel Quiroz's Mercedes-Benz, rekindled detectives' interest. The envelope held Warren's photo and directions to his home. This lead ultimately drew police back to Haro, more than four years after they had dismissed her as a suspect.

Detectives belatedly unraveled a sequence of events in which Haro approached her brother, Manuel, for help in murdering her ex-husband to secure custody of her young daughter. Manuel Haro in turn approached his former employer, Miguel Quiroz, who owned a Rancho Cucamonga pizzeria where Haro's brother had worked. Quiroz then hired Jorge Hernandez, passing him $10,000 to effect the murder of Warren. As part of a plea deal Quiroz produced a letter Claudia Haro had given to him that specified when Warren should be murdered. It read, "not wed or sat my daughter is w/ him." In December 2005, Haro was arrested on charges related to the crime.

After being indicted she pleaded no contest to two counts of attempted murder and a principal firearm charge for the attack on Warren and his mother. In April 2012, she was sentenced to 12 years and 4 months in prison. Joe Pesci attended her sentencing hearing, and was visibly distraught as Haro was led into custody by the bailiffs. She served her sentence at the California Institution for Women in Chino, California. Haro was paroled in August 2019. Warren retained sole custody of their daughter. Although an accomplice to the would-be murderer testified that he received payment from Haro in front of Pesci's home (later searched by police), Pesci was never charged in connection with the attempted murder of Warren.

Dateline NBC covered the case in Season 21, Episode 2, titled "The Plot Thickens", which originally aired on September 28, 2012.
