= Love Is All There Is =

1996 film by Joseph Bologna

- DVD cover
- Directed by: Joseph Bologna; Renée Taylor
- Written by: Joseph Bologna; Renée Taylor
- Produced by: Elliott Kastner
- Starring: Lainie Kazan; Joseph Bologna; Barbara Carrera; Renée Taylor; William Hickey; Dick Van Patten; Abe Vigoda; Connie Stevens; Paul Sorvino; Angelina Jolie; Nathaniel Marston
- Cinematography: Alan Jones
- Edited by: Nicholas Eliopoulos; Dennis M. O'Connor
- Music by: Jeff Beal
- Distributed by: The Samuel Goldwyn Company
- Release date: May 10, 1996
- Running time: 120 minutes
- Country: United States
- Language: English
- Box office: $32,925 (USA sub-total)

Love Is All There Is is a 1996 romantic comedy film written and directed by Joseph Bologna and Renée Taylor, who also both star in the film.

== Plot ==
Love Is All There Is is a modern retelling of the Romeo and Juliet story, and it is set in the Bronx.

The Capomezzos, Bronx-born Sicilians, own a local catering business. They develop a bitter rivalry with the pretentious Malacicis, recent immigrants from Florence and owners of a fine Italian restaurant.

The Capomezzos' son, Rosario, falls in love with the Malacicis' daughter, Gina, after she replaces the star of the neighborhood church's staging of Romeo and Juliet. The rivalry intensifies after Rosario deflowers Gina after a fight with her parents.

The movie was made in a few locations in New York: it was filmed at Greentree Country Club in New Rochelle, and many scenes were shot in City Island, Bronx.

== Cast ==
- Angelina Jolie as Gina Malacici
- Nathaniel Marston as Rosario Capomezzo
- Lainie Kazan as Sadie Capomezzo, Rosario's mother
- Joseph Bologna as Mike Capomezzo, Rosario's father
- Barbara Carrera as Maria Malacici, Gina's mother
- Paul Sorvino as Piero Malacici, Gina's father
- Connie Stevens as Miss DeLuca
- Renée Taylor as Mona
- William Hickey as Monsignor
- Dick Van Patten as Dr. Rodino
- Abe Vigoda as Rudy
- Joy Behar as Mary
- Vera Lockwood as Donna
- Sal Richards as Sal
- Annie Meisels as Dottie
- Bobby Alto as Joe Fasuli
- Celeste Russi as Isabel
- Gabriel Bologna as Tony
- Windland Smith as Carmella
- Randy K. Blackman as Flower Girl #1

== Reception ==
Lawrence Van Gelder of The New York Times called it a "buoyant, wickedly funny comedy" and a "boisterous celebration of young love and the possibilities of parental coexistence." The Los Angeles Times found "the film was not enough".
