= Joe Pesci =

American actor (born 1943)

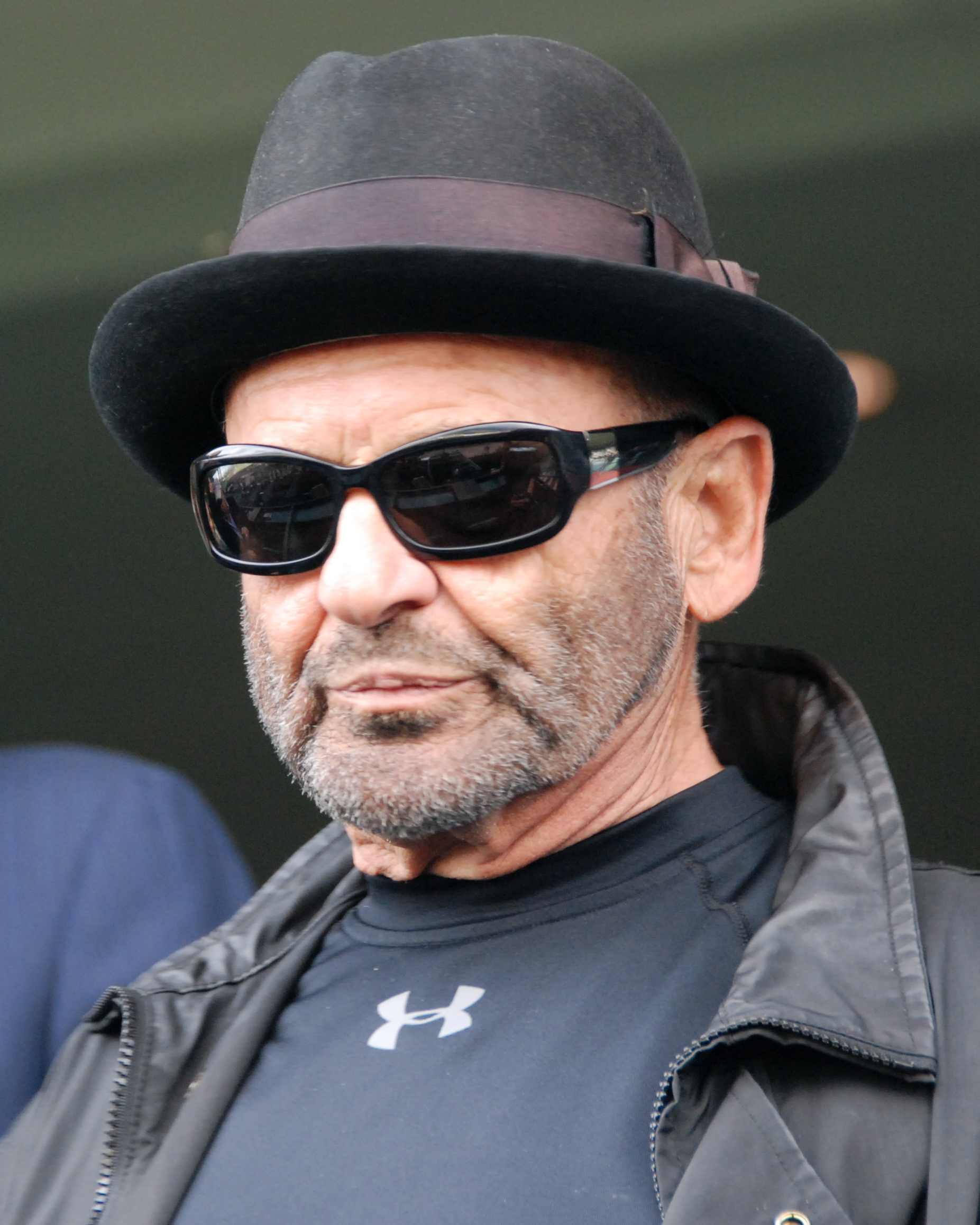
- Pesci in 2009
- Born: Joseph Frank Pesci; February 9, 1943 (age 83); Newark, New Jersey, U.S.
- Occupations: Actor; musician
- Years active: 1961–1999; 2006–present
- Spouse: Claudia Haro (m. 1988; div. 1992)
- Partners: Angie Everhart; (2000–2008)
- Children: 1
- Awards: Full list
- Musical career
- Genres: Jazz; soft rock
- Instruments: Vocals; guitar

Joseph Frank Pesci (/ˈpɛʃi/ PESH-ee Italian: [ˈpeʃʃi]; born February 9, 1943) is an American actor and musician. He is best known for portraying tough, volatile characters in a variety of genres and for his collaborations with Martin Scorsese and Robert De Niro in the films Raging Bull (1980), Goodfellas (1990), Casino (1995), and The Irishman (2019).

Pesci also appeared in Once Upon a Time in America (1984), Moonwalker (1988), JFK (1991), A Bronx Tale (1993), and The Good Shepherd (2006). He is also known for his comic roles in Home Alone (1990) and its sequel Home Alone 2: Lost in New York (1992), My Cousin Vinny (1992), and the Lethal Weapon franchise (1989–1998).

Pesci won the Academy Award for Best Supporting Actor for his role as the gangster character Tommy DeVito in Goodfellas and received two other nominations in the same category for his portrayals of Joey LaMotta and Russell Bufalino in Raging Bull and The Irishman, respectively. Pesci retired from acting in 1999, but has periodically returned to act since then.

Pesci is also a musician who has recorded three studio albums: Little Joe Sure Can Sing! (1968), Vincent LaGuardia Gambini Sings Just for You (1998), and Pesci... Still Singing (2019).

== Early life ==
Joseph Frank Pesci was born on February 9, 1943, in Newark, New Jersey. His mother, Mary (née Mesce), was a part-time barber, and his father, Angelo Pesci, was a forklift truck driver for General Motors and a bartender. Pesci is of Italian descent with family origins both in Turin and Aquilonia in the province of Avellino. He was raised in Belleville, New Jersey, and graduated from Belleville High School.

By the time Pesci was five years old, he was appearing in plays in New York. At age 10, Pesci was a regular on a television variety show called Startime Kids, which also featured Connie Francis. As an entertainer from Belleville, he was acquainted with guitarist Tommy DeVito of The Four Lovers, a novelty act from Belleville that included singer Frankie Valli. Pesci also knew keyboardist Bob Gaudio of The Royal Teens. Pesci introduced Gaudio to DeVito and Valli in 1958, which led to the formation of the band The Four Seasons. Pesci and DeVito remained friends for the rest of DeVito's life; when DeVito fell on hard times in the 1970s following his resignation from the Four Seasons, Pesci placed DeVito on his personal payroll and arranged for him to make cameos in some of his films in the 1990s.

Pesci was childhood friends with American Mafia figure Robert Bisaccia.

== Career ==
=== Early career ===
In the 1960s, Pesci began working as a barber. At the same time, Pesci tried to start a musical career, playing guitar with several bands, including Joey Dee and the Starliters, who introduced the "Peppermint Twist" record, dance, and Peppermint Lounge in New York City.

In 1968, Pesci released his debut album Little Joe Sure Can Sing! (billed as Joe Ritchie), on which he sang covers of contemporary pop hits.

Pesci later joined Frank Vincent as a comedy duo, performing as "Vincent and Pesci" from 1970 to 1976. Their act coupled Abbott and Costello-inspired double act antics with Don Rickles-style insult comedy, which proved popular with crowds. During this time, the pair developed a strong professional and personal friendship. In 1975, they appeared in the Broadway show The New Vaudevillians, which only lasted a week.

The first film Pesci starred in was the 1976 low-budget crime film The Death Collector alongside Frank Vincent. After the film, Pesci returned to The Bronx and lived above Amici's Restaurant, where he was an employee.

=== Acting ===
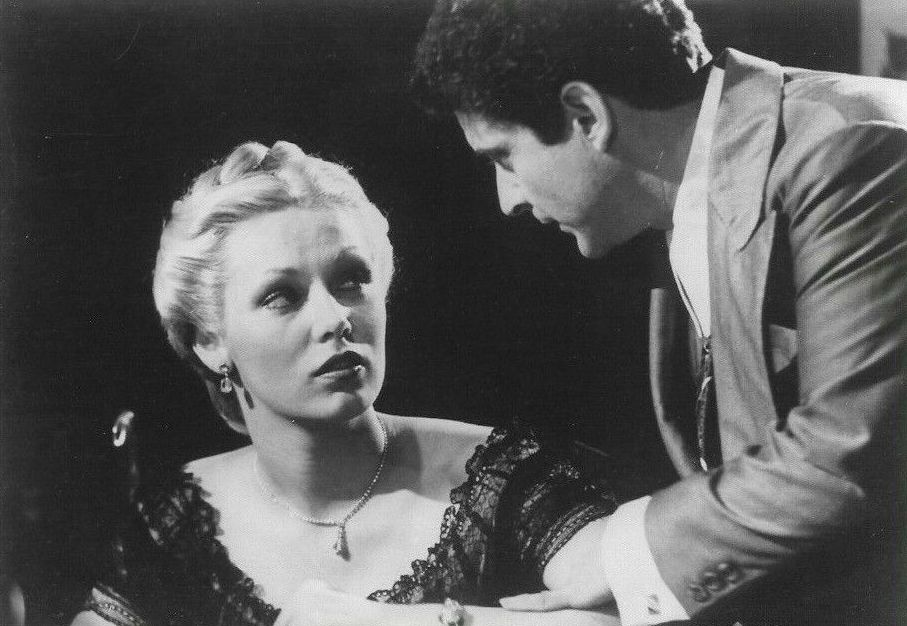
Pesci with co-star Cathy Moriarty on the set of Raging Bull

In 1979, Pesci received a phone call from Martin Scorsese and Robert De Niro, who were impressed with his performance in The Death Collector and asked him to co-star in Scorsese's Raging Bull as Joey LaMotta. During the course of filming, Pesci broke one of his ribs during a fight scene with De Niro. For his role in the film, he was nominated for an Academy Award for Best Supporting Actor and won Most Promising Newcomer at the 1981 British Academy Film Awards.

In 1982, according to a conversation intercepted by the FBI between actor James Caan and mobster Anthony Fiato, Caan requested that Fiato beat up Pesci for failing to pay an $8,000 hotel bill.

In 1984, Pesci was cast in Once Upon a Time in America, again appearing alongside De Niro. The following year, Pesci starred as private detective Rocky Nelson in the short-lived television comedy series Half Nelson.

In 1988, Pesci appeared in the Michael Jackson musical anthology film Moonwalker, in the film's sixth and longest segment, "Smooth Criminal". He played the antagonist, crime boss Frankie "Mr. Big" LiDeo (an analogue for one of the film's producers and longtime Jackson manager Frank DiLeo, with whom Pesci later acted in Goodfellas).

Pesci appeared as Leo Getz, a comedic sidekick and best friend to protagonist detectives Martin Riggs (Mel Gibson) and Roger Murtaugh (Danny Glover) in the Lethal Weapon sequels, released in 1989, 1992, and 1998.

In 1990, Pesci reunited with Scorsese and De Niro for Goodfellas, where he played mobster Tommy DeVito, based on real-life mobster Thomas DeSimone. Tommy DeVito was also the name of Pesci's old acquaintance from Belleville, New Jersey, and a member of The Four Seasons, but contrary to popular belief, the naming is coincidental. Pesci's old friend Frank Vincent also appears in the film. Pesci's character kills Vincent's character in a rage in one of the best-remembered scenes in the film after the Vincent character contemptuously tells him to "go home and get your fucking shine box". According to Pesci, improvisation and ad-libbing came out of rehearsals, where Scorsese let the actors do whatever they wanted. He made transcripts of these sessions, took the lines the actors came up with that he liked best, and put them into a revised script that the cast worked from during principal photography.

For example, the scene where Tommy tells a story and Henry is responding to him—the "Funny how? Do I amuse you?" scene—is based on an actual event that Pesci experienced. He was waiting tables when he thought he made a compliment to a mobster by saying he was "funny", which was not taken well. It was worked on in rehearsals where he and Liotta improvised, and Scorsese recorded four to five takes, rewrote their dialogue, and inserted it into the script. The dinner scene with Tommy's mother was largely improvised. Pesci received the Academy Award for Best Supporting Actor for the role, which he accepted with one of the shortest speeches in Oscar history, saying simply, "It's my privilege. Thank you" before leaving the stage.

Pesci also co-starred in the blockbuster Home Alone in 1990, his character Harry Lime one of two bumbling burglars - along with Daniel Stern as Marv Murchins - who attempt to burgle the house of an eight-year-old played by Macaulay Culkin. Pesci's use of "cartoon cursing" or menacing gibberish, garnered comparisons to Looney Tunes character Yosemite Sam. Pesci reprised his role in a sequel Home Alone 2: Lost in New York (1992).

In 1991, Pesci played David Ferrie in JFK. The following year, he appeared as the title character in the comedy My Cousin Vinny with Ralph Macchio, Marisa Tomei and Fred Gwynne. Also in 1992, Pesci headed up the cast of The Public Eye as Leon "Bernzy" Bernstein, a photographer. His performance in the film, a departure from his usual characters, has been critically acclaimed.

Pesci hosted the sketch comedy show Saturday Night Live on October 10, 1992, while doing publicity for My Cousin Vinny. During his monologue, in response to Sinéad O'Connor tearing a picture of Pope John Paul II on the previous broadcast in protest of sexual abuse in the Catholic Church, Pesci described how he wished to give her "such a smack".

In 1993, Pesci made an appearance in A Bronx Tale as Carmine. The film starred Robert De Niro, who also directed, and Chazz Palminteri, who wrote the play from which the film was adapted. Both De Niro and Palminteri personally offered Pesci the role. In 1995, Pesci had his third collaboration with Scorsese and De Niro in the film Casino, playing Nicky Santoro, based on real-life Mob enforcer Anthony Spilotro, along with Sharon Stone and James Woods. Pesci had previously co-starred with the latter in Once Upon a Time in America. During filming, Pesci broke the same rib that had been broken 15 years prior during the production of Raging Bull. In 1996, he was considered to play Myron Larabee, the stressed-out postman, in Jingle All the Way opposite Arnold Schwarzenegger, but the part was ultimately given to Sinbad, whose physical size was more comparable to Schwarzenegger's.

Pesci had starring roles in several other films, including Man on Fire (1987), The Super (1991), Jimmy Hollywood (1994), With Honors (also 1994) and Gone Fishin' (1997). Pesci's role in With Honors was a dramatic role in which he played a homeless man living on the campus of Harvard.

=== Musical ===
In 1998, Pesci released his second album and his first in 30 years, Vincent LaGuardia Gambini Sings Just for You, which was named after his character from the 1992 film My Cousin Vinny. The album was both humorous and serious, exploring a variety of genres, though most of it was big band jazz. The album spawned the single "Wise Guy", a rap number that played on the gangsta theme by making reference to Mafia gangsterism. "Wise Guy" interpolated the 1980 hit "Rapture" by Blondie and was co-written and produced by the hip-hop production team the Trackmasters.

=== Semi-retirement from acting ===
In 1999, Pesci retired from acting to pursue a musical career and to enjoy life away from the camera. He returned to acting when he did a cameo in De Niro's 2006 film The Good Shepherd. In 2010, Pesci starred in the brothel drama Love Ranch alongside Helen Mirren.

Pesci appeared with Don Rickles, with whom he had worked in Casino, in a 2011 Snickers advertisement in which he portrays the angry alter ego of a young man who attends a party and becomes agitated by two women until he is calmed down by eating a Snickers bar.

In 2011, Pesci sued Fiore Films, the producers of the film Gotti, saying they had broken their promise to cast him in the film as real-life mobster Angelo Ruggiero. Pesci stated that he had gained 30 pounds (14 kg) for the role. He sued them for $3 million, which was the payment he had been promised. The lawsuit was settled out of court in 2013 for an unspecified sum, and the role, after many production delays, eventually went to Pruitt Taylor Vince.

Pesci appears in the 2016 music documentary Jimmy Scott: I Go Back Home, in which he is filmed recording "The Folks Who Live on the Hill" from Scott's 2017 posthumous album I Go Back Home.

=== Reprise for The Irishman and subsequent roles ===
In 2017, Pesci was cast alongside Robert De Niro and Al Pacino in The Irishman, a crime film directed by Martin Scorsese. He was offered his role a reported 50 times before agreeing to take part, at first saying that he did not want to do "the gangster thing again," while Scorsese tried to persuade Pesci that The Irishman would be "different." The film received a limited theatrical release on November 1, 2019, followed by digital streaming on November 27, 2019, by Netflix. Pesci's performance as Russell Bufalino was critically acclaimed and earned him various accolades, including nominations for the Academy Award for Best Supporting Actor, the BAFTA Award for Best Supporting Actor and for two Screen Actors Guild Awards. Pesci also returned to music with his third album and his first in 21 years, titled Pesci... Still Singing, released on November 29, 2019.

Following The Irishman, Pesci co-starred in Pete Davidson's comedy series Bupkis and appeared in Jack Huston's directorial debut Day of the Fight, both released in 2023.

== Personal life ==
Pesci has been married and divorced three times.

His first marriage was in January 1964. His second marriage was from 1988 to 1992, to Claudia Haro, a model and actress. They have a daughter. In 2000, Pesci started dating Angie Everhart. They became engaged in 2007 but broke up the following year.

== Filmography ==
=== Film ===
Year	Title	Role	Notes
1961	Hey, Let's Twist!	Dancer at the Peppermint Lounge	Uncredited
1976	The Death Collector	Joe Salvino	
1980	Raging Bull	Joey LaMotta	Nominated for the Academy Award for Best Supporting Actor
1982	I'm Dancing as Fast as I Can	Roger	
1982	Dear Mr. Wonderful	Ruby Dennis	
1983	Eureka	Mayakofsky	
1983	Easy Money	Nicky Cerone	
1984	Once Upon a Time in America	Frankie Minaldi	
1984	Everybody in Jail	Corrado Parisi	
1987	Man on Fire	David Coolidge	
1988	Moonwalker	Frankie "Mr. Big" Lideo	
1988	The Legendary Life of Ernest Hemingway	John Dos Passos	
1989	Lethal Weapon 2	Leo Getz	
1990	Catchfire	Leo Carelli	Uncredited cameo
1990	Betsy's Wedding	Oscar Henner	
1990	Goodfellas	Tommy DeVito	Won the Academy Award for Best Supporting Actor
1990	Home Alone	Harry Lyme	
1991	The Super	Louie Kritski Jr.	
1991	JFK	David Ferrie	
1992	My Cousin Vinny	Vincent "Vinny" Gambini	
1992	Lethal Weapon 3	Leo Getz	
1992	The Public Eye	Leon "Bernzy" Bernstein	
1992	Home Alone 2: Lost in New York	Harry Lyme	
1993	A Bronx Tale	Carmine	
1994	Jimmy Hollywood	Jimmy Alto / Jericho	
1994	With Honors	Simon B. Wilder	
1995	Casino	Nicky Santoro	
1997	8 Heads in a Duffel Bag	Tommy Spinelli	
1997	Gone Fishin'	Joe Waters	
1998	Lethal Weapon 4	Leo Getz	
2006	The Good Shepherd	Joseph Palmi	Cameo
2010	Love Ranch	Charlie "Charlie Goodtimes" Bontempo	
2015	A Warrior's Tail	Komar (voice)	
2019	The Irishman	Russell Bufalino	Nominated for the Academy Award for Best Supporting Actor
2023	Day of the Fight	Mike's Father	

=== Television ===
Year	Title	Role	Notes
1985	Half Nelson	Rocky Nelson	6 episodes
1992	Tales from the Crypt	Vic / Jack	Episode: "Split Personality"
1992	Saturday Night Live	Himself / Host	Episode: "Joe Pesci/Spin Doctors"
1994	Sesame Street All-Star 25th Birthday: Stars and Street Forever!	Ronald Grump	Television special
1997	Saturday Night Live	Himself	Episode: "Rob Lowe/Spice Girls"
2023	Bupkis	Joe Larocca	Main role

== Discography ==
- Little Joe Sure Can Sing! (1968) (Brunswick Records)
- Vincent LaGuardia Gambini Sings Just for You (1998) (Columbia Records)
- Pesci... Still Singing (2019) (222 Records/BMG Rights Management)

== Awards and nominations ==
Pesci has received numerous awards nominations including three Academy Award nominations for Best Supporting Actor for his performances in Martin Scorsese's Raging Bull (1980), Goodfellas (1990), and The Irishman (2019).

Year	Award	Category	Nominated work	Result
1981	Academy Awards	Best Supporting Actor	Raging Bull	Nominated
1991	Academy Awards	Best Supporting Actor	Goodfellas	Won
2020	Academy Awards	Best Supporting Actor	The Irishman	Nominated
1982	British Film Academy Awards	Most Promising Newcomer	Raging Bull	Won
2020	British Film Academy Awards	Best Supporting Actor	The Irishman	Nominated
1981	Golden Globe Awards	Best Supporting Actor – Motion Picture	Raging Bull	Nominated
1991	Golden Globe Awards	Best Supporting Actor – Motion Picture	Goodfellas	Nominated
2020	Golden Globe Awards	Best Supporting Actor – Motion Picture	The Irishman	Nominated
1998	Golden Raspberry Awards	Worst Supporting Actor	Lethal Weapon 4	Nominated
2020	Screen Actors Guild Awards	Outstanding Supporting Actor – Motion Picture	The Irishman	Nominated
2020	Screen Actors Guild Awards	Outstanding Ensemble – Motion Picture	The Irishman	Nominated

== See also ==
- List of Italian-American actors
- List of actors with Academy Award nominations
- List of actors with more than one Academy Award nomination in the acting categories
