= Michael Prywes =

American film director

Michael Prywes (born October 8, 1974, in New York, NY, U.S.), is an American director, producer, author, attorney, and screenwriter. He began his film career as an undergraduate at Northwestern University. His feature film directing debut, Returning Mickey Stern had its theatrical release in New York and Los Angeles on April 25, 2003, and its DVD release in 2006. The collapse of his follow-up feature, The King of Summer, led to the 2005 New York Supreme Court lawsuit Prywes v. Eight Entertainment, et al. The production had been featured in the "Hollywood Reporter".

In 2021, Prywes was appointed Chair of the Film program at Five Towns College, where he also teaches law, producing, and writing. He has also taught law at Touro Law Center and LIU-Brooklyn and writing at CUNY Queens College. He also serves as a guest lecturer at graduate courses, and continues to serve as a consultant, panelist, and judge at various film festivals.

On May 20, 2001, Prywes married Devra Scheikowitz, who is also an entertainment and media executive.

== Filmography ==
- The Look (2004) (associate producer)
- The Perpetual Life of Jim Albers (2004) (associate producer)
- Returning Mickey Stern (2003) (producer, director, writer)
- 7th Grade Blues (1996) (producer, writer)
