= Vincent LaGuardia Gambini Sings Just for You =

Studio album by Joe Pesci
- Released: October 13, 1998
- Genre: Comedy; jazz; blues; hip hop
- Label: Columbia
- Producer: Tom "T-Bone" Wolk, Poke & Tone

Joe Pesci chronology
Little Joe Sure Can Sing (1968)	Vincent LaGuardia Gambini Sings Just for You (1998)	Pesci... Still Singing (2019)

Vincent LaGuardia Gambini Sings Just for You is the second studio album from actor and singer Joe Pesci.

== History ==
The idea for the album originated from Pesci's character Vincent LaGuardia Gambini, from his 1992 movie My Cousin Vinny. In the movie, Pesci starred as Vinny, an inexperienced lawyer who comes to the rescue of his wrongly accused cousin Billy Gambini, played by Ralph Macchio.

Before becoming a professional actor, Pesci was a lounge singer. When he announced his retirement from acting in 1999, he pursued a further career in singing. Pesci remained retired until his return to acting in Robert De Niro's 2006 film The Good Shepherd, where he played Joseph Palmi.

The album was released on October 13, 1998, on Columbia Records. It is stamped with a parental advisory sticker for explicit content. A music video was produced for the song "Wise Guy," featuring Pesci reciting his lyrics in various mob-themed settings. "Wise Guy" recreates elements from the Blondie song "Rapture" and features a chorus lyrically similar to that of Fred Rogers' "Won't You Be My Neighbor?".

== Track listing ==
1. "Yo Cousin Vinny"
2. "Wise Guy"
3. "Take Your Love and Shove It"
4. "I've Got News for You"
5. "How Do You Like Me So Far"
6. "Robbie Hood"
7. "Twenty-One"
8. "Old Man Time"
9. "He'll Have to Go"
10. "I Can't Give You Anything But Love"
11. "If It Doesn't Snow for Christmas"
12. "What a Wonderful World"
13. "Yo Cousin Vinny" (Italian)
14. "Yo Cousin Vinny" (Spanish)

== Reception ==
Critic Michael Gallucci of Allmusic gave the album a negative review and a rating of 1 star out of a possible 5. Gallucci writes that apart from a few jazzy numbers drawing successfully on Pesci's experience as a lounge singer, the album is "a mound of failed songs and lame jokes."
