= Returning Mickey Stern =

- DVD cover
- Directed by: Michael Prywes
- Written by: Michael Prywes
- Produced by: Jason Akel; Joseph Bologna; Victor Erdos; Michael Prywes
- Starring: Joseph Bologna; Tom Bosley; Renée Taylor; Connie Stevens; Joshua Fishbein
- Cinematography: Steve Denny; Mark Smith
- Edited by: Suzanne Pillsbury
- Music by: Jeff Jones
- Distributed by: Metroscape Entertainment
- Release dates: January 20, 2002 (Sarasota Film Festival); April 25, 2003 (United States)
- Running time: 93 minutes
- Country: United States
- Language: English

Returning Mickey Stern is a 2002 comedy film written and directed by Michael Prywes. It stars Joseph Bologna, Tom Bosley, Renée Taylor, Connie Stevens, and Joshua Fishbein and was shot almost entirely on Fire Island, off the coast of Long Island, NY. It is the story of a former professional baseball player who discovers a second chance at life and love on the island. The film opened in theaters in New York, Los Angeles, and Massachusetts in 2003, and was released by Pathfinder Home Entertainment on DVD in 2006.

Returning Mickey Stern was the first film ever to have four of its stars chosen by the worldwide Internet audience. Through the CastOurMovie web portal, web users could view audition video, peruse headshots and resumes, and discuss their opinions about the actors. The web site garnered the attention of Time magazine, Entertainment Weekly, Industry Standard, the U.S. News & World Report, and many other media outlets. Two million people participated in the online voting, and the winners were: Kylie Delre, Michael Oberlander, Sarah Schoenberg, and John Sloan.

== Plot ==
Mickey Stern is signed by the New York Yankees to play baseball out of high school. He also falls in love with an older woman, Leah, but his professional and personal lives are disrupted by the Korean War.

Mickey returns from military duty a changed man. His baseball career never takes off, and he becomes a magician. But when he meets the spitting image of his former love as well as a younger version of himself, Mickey attempts to bring back the past.

== Cast ==
- Joseph Bologna as Mickey
- Tom Bosley as Mankelbaum
- Joshua Fishbein as Young Mickey/Michael
- Kylie Delre as Leah/Ilana
- Renée Taylor as Jeannie
- Connie Stevens as Dr. Vandenwild
- Sarah Schoenberg as Dina
- Michael Oberlander as Ben
