= The Death Collector =

Family Enforcer
- DVD cover
- Directed by: Ralph De Vito
- Written by: Ralph De Vito
- Produced by: Peter S. Davis; William N. Panzer
- Starring: Joseph Cortese; Joe Pesci; Frank Vincent; Bobby Alto
- Cinematography: Bob Bailin
- Edited by: Dominique Milbank
- Music by: Jake Stern
- Distributed by: Goldstone Film Enterprises
- Release date: October 29, 1976
- Running time: 85 minutes
- Country: United States
- Language: English

The Death Collector (also known as The Family Enforcer) is a 1976 low-budget crime film directed by Ralph De Vito and starring Joseph Cortese, Joe Pesci and Frank Vincent. It was Ralph De Vito's only film as a director, and Joe Pesci's first billed appearance in a movie.

Pesci and Vincent's performances in the film were met with high critical acclaim. Actor Robert De Niro saw the film and recommended it to director Martin Scorsese for Raging Bull, which was the start of De Niro's numerous collaborations with Pesci and Vincent.

== Background ==
The film follows the progress of Jerry Bolanti, a small-time, short tempered crook who becomes a debt collector for an organized crime leader. It has the tagline, "If You Liked "The Godfather" & "Dog Day Afternoon," Then This Is Your Kind of Motion Picture." The film was originally released in 1975 and became a cult favorite. For around a year it was screened in the Los Angeles area.

== Plot ==
Jerry Bolanti, a Mafia-connected hoodlum, is released from jail and is looking for a job. During this very uncertain and stressful transitional period, he plays the field to help stay relaxed. He discovers almost by accident that he has a talent for debt collecting and intimidation. He then decides to pay a visit to a mid-level wiseguy acquaintance and offer up his services.

His first task is to collect from a certain Bernie Feldshuh. Before he can deliver the swag to his capo, he is intercepted by Bernie's henchmen, who take back the money and leave him for dead. Jerry returns to Bernie's home while still healing from his gunshot wounds and extracts a moderate amount of retribution. Bernie's response is to hire a top-notch assassin named Marley to take down Jerry as well as the lawyer named Herb Greene who commissioned him to collect on the debt in the first place. An unfortunate secretary becomes collateral damage. Jerry's boss Anthony learns of the deed and sends a man of his own to even the score. An unfortunate bodyguard becomes collateral damage, and Jerry never does recover the $28,000.

His next assignment is to team up with enforcers Joe and Serge to conduct a raid on a shop manager for $40,000 that he may or may not have "owed" to somebody. But Bernie's newly hired hitman Marley is watching and waiting for an opportunity to take Jerry down. This proves disastrous for the entire operation. After the heist, the trio of gangsters heads over to a hotel room to count out the profits and celebrate a little.

While Jerry is downstairs in the hotel restaurant, their secret adversary, Marley, assassinates both Serge and Joe. He makes off with the money as well. At this point, Jerry's handler Tony begins accusing him of keeping the loot for himself. He refuses to believe that Jerry could make off with so much money, only to immediately lose it all again. Nobody could possibly be that incompetent. Jerry manages to tease out the contractor's identity from a restaurateur named Spinoza. He hunts Marley down and terminates his career in a field of tall grass.

Later, he receives a call from Gus at the local junk yard. Gus says that a camper has come in and that Jerry might be able to salvage it for himself and his live-in girlfriend Paula. Just as things begin looking rosy for Jerry and Paula, he is bushwhacked right in front of the battered red camper by three gun-toting villains. He dies as a result. The movie ends exactly the same way it began by showing the same two hoodlums in the same automobile dumping yet another body into the same ravine. Only this time, instead of an anonymous corpse, it's young Jerry Bolanti. The mastermind behind this particular hit is then shown to be none other than his former boss, Tony.

== Cast ==
- Joseph Cortese as Jerry Bolanti
- Lou Criscuolo as Anthony Iadavia (credited as Lou Criscuola)
- Joe Pesci as Joe Salvino
- Bobby Alto as Sergio "Serge"
- Frank Vincent as Bernie Feldshuh
- Keith Davis as Marley
- Jack Ramage as Herb Greene
- Anne Johns as Paula
- Bob D'Andrea as Ned
- Victoria Hale as Sally
- Frank Ammirati as Spinoza
- Gino Gennaro as Chuck
- Floyd Levine as Kruger
- Raymond Serra as Doctor
- Sal La Pera as Gus
- Richard Ward as Gunsmith
- Frank Piazza as "Butchy"
- Anthony Manufo as Frank Benino
- Lorenzo Philip Gonnella as Craps Dealer
- Philip Gonnella as Craps Player
