= Mal Z. Lawrence =

American comedian and actor (1932–2021)

Mal Z. Lawrence (born Manny Miller) (September 2, 1932 – August 30, 2021) was an American comedian and actor.

== Life ==
Lawrence was a successful comedian whose career began at resorts in the Catskills, where he appeared from 1955 through the 2000s. He also appeared regularly in other parts of the country, performing material geared largely toward Jewish audiences. In 1991, he was one of four comedians who appeared in a Broadway show, Catskills on Broadway, at the Lunt-Fontanne Theater and later on tour. He also acted in films, including Rounders in 1998 and Boynton Beach Club in 2005.

Lawrence was married to Patty Heinz from 1980 until his death.
