= Jimmy Hollywood =

- Theatrical release poster
- Directed by: Barry Levinson
- Written by: Barry Levinson
- Produced by: Mark Johnson; Barry Levinson
- Starring: Joe Pesci; Christian Slater; Victoria Abril
- Cinematography: Peter Sova
- Edited by: Jay Rabinowitz
- Music by: Robbie Robertson
- Distributed by: Paramount Pictures
- Release date: April 1, 1994
- Running time: 117 minutes
- Country: United States
- Language: English
- Budget: $30 million
- Box office: $3.8 million

Jimmy Hollywood is a 1994 American comedy film written and directed by Barry Levinson and starring Joe Pesci and Christian Slater. It was released on April 1, 1994 and was a box-office bomb, grossing just $3 million against its $30 million budget.

== Plot ==
Jimmy Alto is a failing actor living in Los Angeles. After increasing frustration with his career going nowhere and with crime in the city, Jimmy, along with his "spaced-out" best friend William, decides to take the law into his own hands.

After losing his job as a waiter, Jimmy transforms himself into "Jericho," leader of a mock-vigilante group that videotapes criminals and then turns them over to the police. Jimmy enjoys the free publicity, anonymously but eventually the police begin to close in on him, resulting in a tense standoff at the Grauman's Egyptian Theatre.

== Cast ==
- Joe Pesci as Jimmy Alto / Jericho
- Christian Slater as William
- Victoria Abril as Lorraine De La Peña
- Jason Beghe as Detective
- John Cothran, Jr. as Detective
- Hal Fishman as Hal
- Jerry Dunphy as Anchorperson
- Claudia Haro as Newscaster
- Arthel Neville as Newscaster
- Robert LaSardo as Robber
- Richard Kind as Driver
- Marcus Giamatti as Preppie
- James Pickens Jr. as Cook
- Lou Cutell as Meyerhoff
- Thomas Rosales Jr. as Tough Guy
- Chuck Zito as Tough Guy
- Earl Billings as Captain
- Rob Weiss as Himself
- Chad McQueen as Himself
- Robbi Chong as Secretary
- Jodie Markell as Assistant
- Barry Levinson as Himself
- Reginald Ballard as Man on Street
- Harrison Ford as Himself (uncredited)

== Production ==
Robbie Robertson created music for the film and produced the soundtrack with Howard Drossin providing additional music.

== Reception ==
Rotten Tomatoes gave the film a 28% approval rating from a sample of 25 reviews, with an average rating of 4.1/10. Roger Ebert gave the film 2 1/2 stars out of 4. Ebert praised the actors "who find the right tone for the material", but criticize the plot, which "weighs them down". He concluded "Here are characters who might have really amounted to something, and we can see the movie dying right under their feet."

Audiences polled by CinemaScore gave the film an average grade of "C" on an A+ to F scale. Produced on a budget of $30 million, the film made less than $4 million in ticket sales.
