= Joseph Bologna =

American actor (1934–2017)

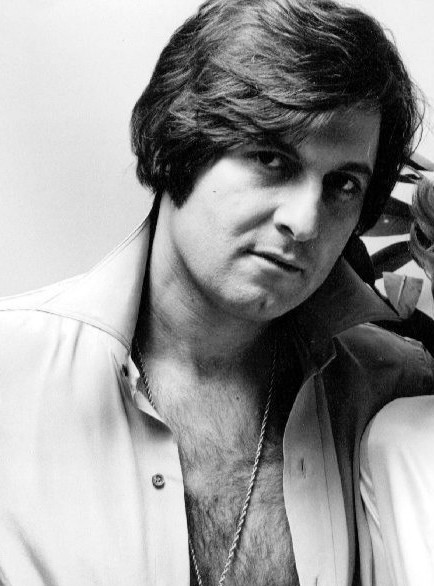
- Bologna in 1974
- Born: December 30, 1934; Brooklyn, New York, U.S.
- Died: August 13, 2017 (aged 82); Duarte, California, U.S.
- Other name: Joe Bologna
- Education: Brown University
- Occupation: Actor
- Years active: 1970–2012
- Spouse: Renée Taylor (m. 1965)
- Children: 1 (Note: Although some sources have claimed that Bologna had two children with his wife, Renée Taylor, a son and a daughter, the couple stated in a 1996 interview that they had only one child, a son. The other child who is claimed to be theirs is actually the wife of their son.)

Joseph Bologna (December 30, 1934 – August 13, 2017) was an American actor, playwright and screenwriter notable for his roles in the comedy films My Favorite Year, Blame It on Rio, Big Daddy, and Transylvania 6-5000.

== Life and career ==
Bologna was born in the Parkville section of Brooklyn, New York, to an Italian-American family. He attended St. Rose of Lima school and Brown University, where he majored in art history. Bologna served with the United States Marine Corps. Bologna was hired to produce and direct Manhattan-based TV commercials.

Bologna enjoyed a long run in film and television. His breakthrough film Lovers and Other Strangers adapted with his wife Renée Taylor from a play they co-wrote, was based on the true-life circumstances of organizing a wedding on short notice with the involvement of his Italian extended family and her Jewish clan. Several relatives performed as extras in the final cut. The couple shared an Academy Award nomination for Best Adapted Screenplay. A year later, in 1971, the couple again collaborated to write and perform in the film Made for Each Other.

Bologna stayed close with his old-neighborhood aunts and uncles after becoming successful. Two of them were slightly famous on their own: His Uncle Pat was Blacky the Bootblack, whom Joseph Kennedy credited as his main influence when he sold all of his stock holdings in the summer of 1929 (the market crashed in October); his aunt Pauline was one of the better-known celebrity chefs, working for Jackie Gleason, Burt Reynolds and others.

Bologna's aunt Pauline chastised him for starring in Blame It on Rio (starring Michael Caine), which contained some nudity; Bologna remarked "Blame it on me. It's the last time I invite Aunt Pauline to a film premiere." In 1976, he starred in the television drama What Now, Catherine Curtis? with Lucille Ball. Other film roles for Bologna include:

- playing the brother of James Caan's widowed protagonist in Neil Simon's 1979 romance Chapter Two
- portraying the Sid Caesar-based character King Kaiser in the 1982 comedy hit My Favorite Year (which starred Peter O'Toole in the role of drunken film star Alan Swann, modeled after Errol Flynn)
- as Lenny Koufax, the frustrated father of perpetual slacker Sonny Koufax (Adam Sandler) in the 1999 comedy Big Daddy

In 1987, Bologna starred in the TV musical sitcom Rags to Riches as Nick Foley, a millionaire mogul turned adoptive father.

He played the mad scientist Dr. Malavaqua in the 1985 comedy Transylvania 6-5000.

From 1996 to 1998, Bologna voiced Inspector Dan Turpin in Superman: The Animated Series. In 2006, he voiced Mr. Start in Ice Age: The Meltdown.

He and his wife Renée Taylor had a son Gabriel. Gabriel became an actor, writer and director, and directed his father in his last film, "Tango Shalom". Taylor and Bologna starred together on stage and on television. Bologna played a love interest for his wife in the episode "Maternal Affairs" of the sitcom The Nanny in the sixth and final season, in which Taylor plays Sylvia, the mother of Fran Drescher's character. He also appeared in the first-season episode "The Gym Teacher" as a famous actor for whom Maxwell Sheffield once interned.

From 2012 until before his death in 2017, Bologna appeared in numerous roles on TV and in motion pictures, including roles on Funny or Die, stage productions, and national commercials.

In 2017, Bologna received the Night of 100 Stars Oscar Gala Lifetime Achievement Award from actor comedian Richard Lewis and his peers to celebrate his 60-year career and to recognize his efforts to save the Motion Picture Home and Hospital in 2012.

== Death ==
Bologna died on August 13, 2017, at City of Hope National Medical Center in Duarte, California, from pancreatic cancer at age 82.

== Filmography ==
=== Film ===
Year	Title	Role	Notes
1971	Made for Each Other	Giggy	Also writer Nominated — Writers Guild Award for Best Comedy Written Directly for the Screen (shared with Renee Taylor)
1973	Cops and Robbers	Joe	
1974	Mixed Company	Pete	
1976	The Big Bus	Dan Torrance	
1979	Chapter Two	Leo Schneider	Credited as Joe Bologna
1982	My Favorite Year	King Kaiser	
1984	Blame It on Rio	Victor Lyons	
1984	The Woman in Red	Joey	
1985	Transylvania 6-5000	Dr. Malavaqua	
1989	It Had to Be You	Vito Pignoli	
1990	Coupe de Ville	Uncle Phil	
1991	Alligator II: The Mutation	David Hodges	
1992	Jersey Girl	Bennie	
1993	Deadly Rivals	Anthony Canberra	Credited as Joe Bologna
1994	Night of the Archer	Reggie	Credited as Joe Bologna
1996	Love Is All There Is	Mike	Also director/writer
1996	Ringer	Goldstein	
1997	Heaven Before I Die	unknown role	Credited as Joe Bologna
1999	Baby Huey's Great Easter Adventure	P.T. Wynnsocki	Direct-to-video
1999	Big Daddy	Lenny Koufax	
1999	Blink of an Eye	Renfro	
2001	Squint	Mel Kingman	Short film
2001	Dying on the Edge	Cal Roman	
2002	Returning Mickey Stern	Mickey Stern	Also producer
2003	Red Zone	Principal Pugliese	Credited as Joe Bologna
2005	Boynton Beach Club	Harry	
2006	Ice Age: The Meltdown	Mr. Start	Voice role
2007	Dancing on the Edge	Captain Reynolds	Short film
2012	Driving Me Crazy: Proof of Concept	Martin Brown	
2021	Tango Shalom	Father Anthony	Released posthumously, also writer/producer

=== Television ===
Year	Title	Role	Notes
1973	Honor Thy Father	Salvatore "Bill" Bonnano	Television film
1973	Acts of Love and Other Comedies	Arthur Hellman	Television film, also writer Primetime Emmy Award for Outstanding Writing for Comedy, Variety or Music (shared with Renee Taylor) (1973)
1973	Calucci's Department	—N/a	Series creator/writer, 3 episodes
1974	Paradise	David, Biff, Tony	Television film, also writer Nominated — Primetime Emmy Award for Outstanding Writing in a Comedy/Variety, Variety or Music (shared with Renee Taylor) (1974)
1975	Three for Two	—N/a	Television film, writer
1976	What Now, Catherine Curtis?	Peter	Television film
1976	Woman of the Year	Sam Rodino	Television film, also writer
1977	Good Penny	—N/a	Television film, director/writer/producer
1979	Torn Between Two Lovers	Ted Conti	Television film, credited as Joe Bologna
1980	A Cry for Love	—N/a	Television film, writer
1983	One Cooks, the Other Doesn't	Max Boone	Television film
1983	Lovers and Other Strangers	—N/a	Television film, writer/producer Nominated — Academy Award for Best Original Screenplay; Nominated — Writers Guild Award for Best Comedy Adapted from Another Medium (shared with Renee Taylor & David Zelag Goodman)
1984	Bedrooms	Host, Bill, David	Television film, also director/writer
1985	Copacabana	Rico Castelli	Television film
1986	A Time to Triumph	Chuck Hassan	Television film, credited as Joe Bologna
1986	Sins	Steve Bryant	Recurring role, 3 episodes
1987	Not Quite Human	Gordon Vogel	Television film
1987	The New Hollywood Squares	Himself (Panelist)	Episode: "03.23.1987"
1987–1988	Rags to Riches	Nick Foley	Main role, 20 episodes
1988	Win, Lose or Draw	Himself (Contestant)	Episode: "10.17.1988"
1989	Prime Target	Ralph Manza	Television film
1990	Thanksgiving Day	Ned Monk	Television film, credited as Joe Bologna
1991	Married... with Children	Charlie Verducci	Recurring role, 2 episodes
1991	An Inconvenient Woman	Arnie Zwillman	Miniseries, 2 episodes
1991	Top of the Heap	Charlie Verducci	Main role, 7 episodes
1992	Citizen Cohn	Walter Winchell	Television film
1992	The Danger of Love: The Carolyn Warmus Story	Detective Pollino	Television film
1992	Murder, She Wrote	Brynie Sullivan	Episode: "The Mole"
1993	Daddy Dearest	Dr. Di Napoli	Episode: "Offensive Care"
1994	L.A. Law	Jack Barbara	Episode: "Cold Cuts"
1994	Revenge of the Nerds IV: Nerds in Love	Aaron Humphrey	Television film
1994–1999	The Nanny	Dr. Joe Razzo, Alan Beck	2 episodes
1995	Burke's Law	Max Barnett, Leo Barnett	Episode: "Who Killed the Movie Mogul?"
1996	Caroline in the City	Lou Spadaro	Episode: "Caroline and the Ex-Wife"
1997	Temporarily Yours	Mike DeAngelo	Episode: "By Design"
1997	The Don's Analyst	Vincent DeMarco	Television film
1997	Cosby	Chuck	Episode: "Older and Out"
1997–1998	Superman: The Animated Series	Dan Turpin	Voice, 12 episodes
1998	Jenny	Bernie	Episode: "A Girl's Gotta Come Through in a Clutch"
1998	The Simple Life	Phillip Devine	Episode: "The Luke & Sara Show"
1998	Astoria	Unknown role	Television film
1999	Marital Law	Alistair Temple	Episode: "24 Hours"
2000	Chicken Soup for the Soul	Rabbi Goldman	Episode: "14 Steps/Damaged Goods/Ballerina Dreams"
2002	The Chris Isaak Show	Uncle Corky	Episode: "The Hidden Mommy"
2002	Arli$$	Ned Balfour	Episode: "Profiles in Agenting"
2005	Jane Doe: Til Death Do Us Part	Louis Angelini	Television film
2005	Fathers and Sons	Noah	Television film
2005	Everwood	Max Barrett	Episode: "Pieces of Me"
2006	According to Jim	Bill	Episode: "Daddy Dearest"
2010	CSI: Crime Scene Investigation	Giovanni "Papa" DiMasa	Episode: "Meat Jekyll"
2013	Celebrity Ghost Stories	Himself	Episode: "Cherie Currie/Joseph Bologna/Diane Farr/Estella Warren"
