= David Zelag Goodman =

American playwright and screenwriter

- Born: January 15, 1930; New York City, New York, U.S.
- Died: September 26, 2011 (aged 81); Oakland, California, U.S.
- Occupations: Playwright, screenwriter
- Spouse(s): Marjorie (1950–2011; his death; 1 child)

David Zelag Goodman (January 15, 1930 – September 26, 2011) was a playwright and screenwriter for both TV and film. His most prolific period was from the 1960s to the early 1980s. He was nominated for an Academy Award for Lovers and Other Strangers, though he did not win. He co-wrote, with Sam Peckinpah, the screenplay for 1971's controversial Straw Dogs. Other films that he wrote or co-wrote included Logan's Run, Monte Walsh, and Farewell, My Lovely. He also wrote a number of the episodes of The Untouchables in the early 1960s.

== Biography ==
Born to a Jewish family in Manhattan, he majored in English at Queens College, then studied at Yale Drama School in 1958. At age 24, his play, High Named Today, which was to have starred Jane Wyatt on Broadway, ended up running briefly Off-Broadway in February 1954. He was often sought as a "script doctor" because he could quickly identify screenplay flaws, as when Sherry Lansing brought him in to work on the thriller Fatal Attraction. According to his friend, the film and television producer Zev Braun, Goodman said to Lansing of the Glenn Close character: "You can't let her off the hook. You should kill her. Let's drown her!"

Until his death from progressive supranuclear palsy, he was married for 61 years to Marjorie Goodman. Their daughter Kevis Goodman is an associate professor of English at UC Berkeley.

== Filmography ==
- The Stranglers of Bombay (1960) (as David Z. Goodman)
- Lovers and Other Strangers (1970) (with Joseph Bologna and Renée Taylor)
- Monte Walsh (1970) (with Lukas Heller)
- Straw Dogs (1971) (with Sam Peckinpah)
- Man on a Swing (1974)
- Farewell, My Lovely (1975)
- Logan's Run (1976)
- March or Die (1977) (with Dick Richards)
- Eyes of Laura Mars (1978) (with John Carpenter)
- Fighting Back (1982) (with Tom Hedley)
- Man, Woman and Child (1983) (with Erich Segal)

== TV credits ==
- Goodyear Theatre (1960)
- The New Breed (1961)
- Naked City (1963)
- The Untouchables (1961-1963)
- Combat! (1963, episode "High Named Today")
- Mr. Broadway (1964)
- Freedom Road (1979)
