= Lovers and Other Strangers =

1970 film by Cy Howard

- Theatrical release poster
- Directed by: Cy Howard
- Screenplay by: Joseph Bologna; David Zelag Goodman; Renée Taylor
- Based on: Lovers and Other Strangers (play) by Joseph Bologna and Renée Taylor
- Produced by: David Susskind
- Starring: Beatrice Arthur; Bonnie Bedelia; Michael Brandon; Richard Castellano; Bob Dishy; Harry Guardino; Marian Hailey; Anne Jackson; Cloris Leachman; Anne Meara; Gig Young
- Cinematography: Andrew Laszlo
- Edited by: David Bretherton; Sidney Katz
- Music by: Fred Karlin
- Production company: ABC Pictures
- Distributed by: Cinerama Releasing Corporation
- Release date: August 12, 1970
- Running time: 104 minutes
- Country: United States
- Language: English
- Budget: $2.5 million
- Box office: $7.7 million

Lovers and Other Strangers is a 1970 American romantic comedy film directed by Cy Howard, adapted from the 1968 Broadway play by Renée Taylor and Joseph Bologna. The cast includes Richard S. Castellano, Gig Young, Cloris Leachman, Anne Jackson, Bea Arthur, Bonnie Bedelia, Michael Brandon, Harry Guardino, Anne Meara, Bob Dishy, Marian Hailey, Joseph Hindy, and, in her film debut, Diane Keaton. Sylvester Stallone was an extra in this movie.

The film was nominated for three Academy Awards (it won the Academy Award for Best Original Song), and was one of the top box-office performers of 1970. It established Richard S. Castellano as a star (receiving an Oscar nomination for his performance) and he and Diane Keaton were cast in The Godfather (1972). The Oscar-winning song, "For All We Know", was composed by Fred Karlin, with lyrics by Bread's Jimmy Griffin and Robb Royer. It was famously covered by The Carpenters. The film was originally distributed by Cinerama Releasing Corporation.

Taylor and Bologna followed up with their second screenplay the following year, Made for Each Other, in which they also starred.

== Plot ==
Mike Vecchio and Susan Henderson are a couple that have been secretly living together for one year and a half, pretending to each have roommates to not draw the ire of their tradition-minded families; they ultimately announce a proper engagement to be married. Amidst their liberated yet simple romance, the couple's extended family are dealing with their own sexual hang-ups. Susan's father has been sleeping with his wife's best friend. Mike's brother Richie and his wife Joan have grown "incompatible" and are considering divorce. Mike's Italian-American parents, Frank and Bea, despite their fractious relationship with each other, are relentlessly trying to dissuade Richie from divorcing.

As their wedding draws closer, the tangents of Mike and Susan's relatives and their intimate foibles will all come to a head.

== Cast ==
- Beatrice Arthur as Bea Vecchio
- Bonnie Bedelia as Susan Henderson
- Michael Brandon as Mike Vecchio
- Richard Castellano as Frank Vecchio
- Bob Dishy as Jerry
- Harry Guardino as Johnny
- Marian Hailey as Brenda
- Joseph Hindy as Richie Vecchio
- Anne Jackson as Kathy
- Diane Keaton as Joan Vecchio
- Cloris Leachman as Bernice Henderson
- Anne Meara as Wilma
- Gig Young as Hal Henderson
- Anthony Holland as Donaldson
- Bob Kaliban as Hotel Clerk
- Amy Stiller as Flower Girl / Carol
- Charlotte Jones as Johnny's Mother
- Morton Marshall as Father Gregory
- Conrad Bain as Priest In Confessional (uncredited)
- Connie Mason as Wedding Guest (uncredited)
- Jerry Stiller as Jim (uncredited)
- Sylvester Stallone as Groomsman (uncredited)

== Release ==
=== Home media ===
The vinyl LP soundtrack of the film was released by ABC Records in 1971, catalogue #ABCS 0C 15. It has not been released on compact disc. The film was released on VHS in 1980 by Magnetic Video, but was soon discontinued. The Magnetic Video release was a collector's item for many years, but the film was eventually re-released on VHS by CBS/Fox Video in the 1990s. It was then released by MGM on DVD on July 6, 2004 in full-screen format. The film was released on Blu-ray by KL Studio Classics on March 19, 2019 in anamorphic format with an HD master from a 4K scan of the original camera negative, and includes an audio commentary by film historian Lee Gambin. The aspect ratio for the Blu-ray is 1.85.1 (i.e., the screen dimensions of the original film).

== Reception ==
=== Box office ===
The film was popular at the box office, earning $7.7 million in gross rentals in North America. It recorded an overall profit of $790,000.

=== Critical response ===
On the review aggregator website Rotten Tomatoes, 100% of 6 critics' reviews are positive, with an average rating of 7.4/10. Roger Ebert gave the film 3 and a half stars out of 4, describing it as "pleasant and genuinely amusing a comedy as we’re likely to find this year." Leslie Halliwell stated: "Wise, witty and well acted sex farce, with many actors making the most of ample chances under firm directorial control." Leonard Maltin was enthusiastic: "Vividly real, genuinely funny movie about side effects, reverberations when young couple get married. Film won fame for Castellano, with catch-line "So what's the story?" just one of many memorable vignettes."

=== Accolades ===
Award	Category	Nominee(s)	Result	Ref.
Academy Awards	Best Supporting Actor	Richard S. Castellano	Nominated	
Academy Awards	Best Screenplay – Based on Material from Another Medium	Renée Taylor, Joseph Bologna, and David Zelag Goodman	Nominated	
Academy Awards	Best Song – Original for the Picture	"For All We Know"; Music by Fred Karlin; Lyrics by Robb Royer and Jimmy Griffin	Won	
Golden Globe Awards	Best Motion Picture – Musical or Comedy		Nominated	
Laurel Awards	Best Picture		9th Place	
Laurel Awards	Top Male Supporting Performance	Richard S. Castellano	4th Place	
New York Film Critics Circle Awards	Best Supporting Actor	Richard S. Castellano	Nominated	
Writers Guild of America Awards	Best Comedy – Adapted from Another Medium	Renée Taylor, Joseph Bologna, and David Zelag Goodman	Nominated	
