= Boynton Beach Club =

- Theatrical release poster
- Directed by: Susan Seidelman
- Written by: Susan Seidelman; Shelly Gitlow
- Produced by: Florence Seidelman; Susan Seidelman
- Starring: Brenda Vaccaro; Dyan Cannon; Joseph Bologna; Michael Nouri; Sally Kellerman; Len Cariou; Renée Taylor
- Cinematography: Eric Moynier
- Edited by: Keiko Deguchi
- Music by: Marcelo Zarvos
- Distributed by: Roadside Attractions; Samuel Goldwyn Films
- Release dates: October 21, 2005 (Hamptons International Film Festival); August 4, 2006 (United States)
- Running time: 104 minutes
- Country: United States
- Language: English

Boynton Beach Club is a 2005 American romantic comedy film directed by Susan Seidelman, produced by her and her mother Florence. Based on experiences of Florence and her widowed friend David Cramer at an adult enclave in Boynton Beach (a city in Palm Beach County, Florida), the film was scripted by Susan Seidelman and Coral Gables, Florida writer Shelly Gitlow.

== Plot ==
Several stories of older people in a bereavement group finding new love. Some are funny and some are poignant.

== Cast ==
- Joseph Bologna as Harry
- Dyan Cannon as Lois
- Len Cariou as Jack
- Sally Kellerman as Sandy
- Michael Nouri as Donald
- Renée Taylor as Anita Stern
- Brenda Vaccaro as Marilyn
- Mal Z. Lawrence as Marty

== Release ==
Shot in 2005, Boynton Beach Club premiered in the Hamptons International Film Festival in East Hampton, New York. It was then released to theaters in South Florida on March 17, 2006 and wider on August 4, playing in six states: New York, New Jersey, Connecticut, Missouri, Arizona and California.

The film's working title was The Boynton Beach Bereavement Club.
