= Len Cariou =

Canadian actor and stage director (born 1939)

Len Cariou OC OM
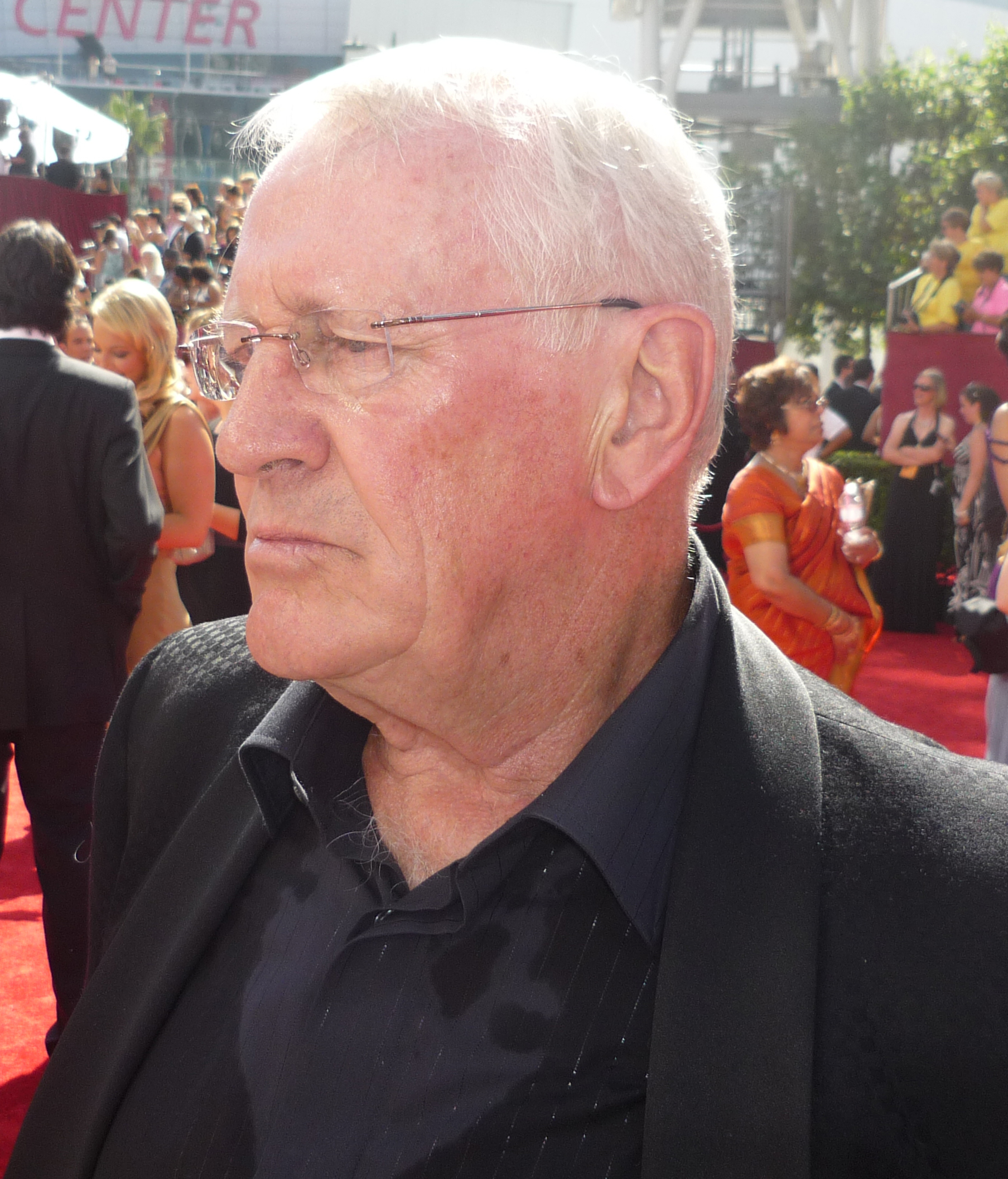
- Cariou in September 2009
- Born: Leonard Joseph Cariou; September 30, 1939 (age 87); St. Boniface (now Winnipeg), Manitoba, Canada
- Education: St. Paul's College
- Occupation: Actor
- Years active: 1959–present
- Spouse: Heather Summerhayes (m. 1985)
- Children: 1
- Awards: Tony Award for Best Actor in a Musical; Drama Desk Award for Outstanding Actor in a Musical

Leonard Joseph Cariou (/ˈkæriu/; born September 30, 1939) is a Canadian actor, singer, and theatre director. He gained prominence for his portrayal of Sweeney Todd in the original cast of Stephen Sondheim's musical Sweeney Todd: The Demon Barber of Fleet Street (1979) alongside Angela Lansbury for which he won the Tony Award for Best Actor in a Musical. He also received Tony nominations for his roles in the Betty Comden and Adolph Green musical Applause (1970) and the Sondheim musical A Little Night Music (1973).

Cariou is also known for his film roles in A Little Night Music (1977), The Four Seasons (1981), Thirteen Days (2000), About Schmidt (2002), Boynton Beach Club (2005), Flags of Our Fathers (2006), Prisoners (2013), and Spotlight (2015). He portrayed Franklin D. Roosevelt in the HBO film Into the Storm (2009) for which he received a nomination for the Primetime Emmy Award for Outstanding Supporting Actor in a Limited Series or Movie. He also is known for his recurring television roles in Murder, She Wrote (1985–1992), Brotherhood (2005–2006), and Damages (2010). From 2010 to 2024, he co-starred as the patriarch Henry Reagan, NYPD Police Commissioner (retired), in the multi-generational CBS series Blue Bloods, a role he reprised in Boston Blue in 2026.

== Early life and education ==
Leonard Joseph Cariou was born on September 30, 1939, in Saint Boniface (now Winnipeg), Manitoba. Cariou's father was French (Breton) and his mother was of Irish descent. Cariou attended Miles Macdonell Collegiate for grades 10 and 11, where he directed and starred in the school plays, and he later attended St Paul's College.

== Career ==
=== 1959–1979 ===
Cariou made his first appearance in Damn Yankees at Rainbow Stage in Winnipeg in 1959, and was a founding member of the Manitoba Theatre Centre. He was offered a scholarship at the National Theatre School of Canada in Montreal but, married with a young child and financial responsibilities, he was forced to decline the honor. Instead, he learned his craft by spending two years at the Stratford Shakespeare Festival in Stratford, Ontario, and returned in 1981 to lead the company as Prospero, Coriolanus, Brutus, and Petruchio.

Cariou also became a lead actor at the Tyrone Guthrie Theatre in Minneapolis in the 1960s, where he played Orlando in As You Like It; Agamemnon in Tyrone Guthrie's compilation of The House of Atreus; Iago; Oberon; and the title roles in Henry V, Oedipus the King, and King Lear. He also was an associate director.In 1968, Cariou made his Broadway debut in The House of Atreus. Two years later, Cariou landed his first starring role opposite Lauren Bacall in Applause, a musical adaptation of the film All About Eve. It earned him a Tony Award nomination as Best Actor in a Musical and won him the Theatre World Award.

In 1973, he received his second Tony nomination for A Little Night Music; he reprised the role of Fredrik for the 1977 film version. Six years later he won both the Tony and Drama Desk Award for his portrayal of Sweeney Todd: The Demon Barber of Fleet Street in the Stephen Sondheim musical opposite Angela Lansbury. Cariou's early film credits include One Man (1977), and the 1977 Harold Prince-directed screen adaptation of A Little Night Music with Elizabeth Taylor.

=== 1980–1999 ===
In 1981, Cariou starred in the Alan Alda directed comedy-drama The Four Seasons alongside Carol Burnett, Rita Moreno, and Sandy Dennis. During these years, Cariou also appeared in a number of benefits, including A Christmas Carol for the Riverside Shakespeare Company in New York, playing Scrooge, with Helen Hayes, Raul Julia, and Mary Elizabeth Mastrantonio, directed by W. Stuart McDowell at the Symphony Space in 1985. His next projects included the Alan Jay Lerner–Charles Strouse musical Dance a Little Closer (1983), Arthur Miller's sole musical, Up from Paradise (1983), Teddy & Alice (1987), and Ziegfeld (1988).

Regionally, Cariou has starred in many productions at theatres throughout North America, including The Kennedy Centre, the Mark Taper Forum, Lincoln Centre, the Long Wharf Theatre and the Old Globe. He has played the title role of Macbeth for Toronto Arts Productions, and Richard Nixon in Frost/Nixon for Canadian Stage in Toronto. He has appeared multiple times throughout his career at the Manitoba Theatre Centre. In 1984, having directed Death of a Salesman at the Citadel Theater, Edmonton, he played the lead in King Lear and was appointed associate director. In 1985 he played Stalin there in David Pownall's Master Class. Cariou appeared at The Geffen Theatre as Joe Keller in a notable production of All My Sons, a role he reprised in 2009 at the Gate Theatre in Dublin, where it was the longest-running, highest-grossing run of a play in that theatre's history. He also appeared at The Geffen in Neil Simon's Rose and Walsh and Heroes with George Segal.

From 1985 to 1992, Cariou appeared in multiple episodes of the popular television mystery series Murder, She Wrote with his friend and former Sweeney Todd co-star Angela Lansbury. Cariou portrayed the recurring character of Michael Hagarty, characterized as an Irish international man of mystery who worked as a secret agent for British MI-6. He would get Jessica Fletcher (Angela Lansbury), the title character of the show, involved in mysteries involving international intrigue.

Cariou also appeared on Broadway in Night Watch, Cold Storage, The Speed of Darkness, Neil Simon's The Dinner Party (with Henry Winkler and John Ritter) and Proof (with Anne Heche and Neil Patrick Harris). He directed Don't Call Back on Broadway as well. His off-Broadway appearances include Master Class, Papa (an Ernest Hemingway one-man show) and Mountain (Justice William O. Douglas). He appeared as Cap'n Andy in the Broadway national tour of Show Boat opposite Cloris Leachman.

Cariou narrated Major League Baseball's World Series films from 1992 to 1997. In addition, he was the narrator of "An Amazin' Era", a video commemorating the 25th anniversary of the New York Mets franchise. He narrated both the original 1986 version and an update that was produced in 1989. He has recorded a number of books, including several by Michael Connelly, for audiotape release. He also narrated the 1989 Academy Award-winning documentary The Johnstown Flood.

In 1993, Cariou was in the TV movie Miracle on Interstate 880. He played Buck Helm. He also guest-starred in an episode of North of 60 when he portrayed Sarah Birkett's estranged father. In 1995, Cariou became the first actor to portray Walt Disney in the Annette Funicello biography A Dream Is a Wish Your Heart Makes: The Annette Funicello Story, based on her book of the same name. In 1997, Cariou appeared in the Star Trek: Voyager episode "Coda". He appeared to Captain Kathryn Janeway as an alien disguised as Admiral Janeway, her deceased father.

=== 2000–present ===
During the 2000s he acted in Thirteen Days (2000), About Schmidt (2002), Secret Window (2004) in which he starred alongside Johnny Depp, who would later go on to play Sweeney Todd in Sweeney Todd: The Demon Barber of Fleet Street, the Tim Burton-directed musical based on the Broadway show in which Cariou starred. He acted in Boynton Beach Club (2005), Flags of Our Fathers (2006), and played the father in the 2007 film 1408, and the nominal lead role in The Onion Movie, based on the satirical newspaper. In 2009, Cariou portrayed Franklin D. Roosevelt in the HBO movie Into the Storm, earning an Emmy nomination for Outstanding Supporting Actor in a Miniseries or a Movie.

In 2010, Cariou appeared as Madoff-like Ponzi scheme man Louis Tobin in the drama Damages, the main antagonist in season three. Cariou has appeared in episodes of The West Wing, Law & Order, The Practice, and The Outer Limits. He had a continuing role in 2006–2007 as power broker Judd Fitzgerald in the series Brotherhood. He played an American naval officer in 2013's "den Orolige Mannen" ("The Troubled Man"), an episode of Wallander adapted from one of Henning Mankell's Kurt Wallander novels. In 2018 he starred alongside Bruce Willis in Death Wish as Dr. Paul Kersey's father-in-law. He appeared as Henry Reagan, the former New York City Police Commissioner and patriarch of the current commissioner's family on Blue Bloods from 2010 to 2024.

More recently, Cariou portrayed Cardinal Law in Spotlight, which won the Academy Award for Best Picture of 2015. He also starred in the short play Happy Birthday, Mr. Abernathy by Lloyd Suh for a public radio show and podcast, Playing On Air.

== Personal life ==
Cariou has been married to author Heather Summerhayes since October 25, 1985. Before his marriage to Summerhayes, he had relationships with actresses Glenn Close and Lauren Bacall.

== Theatre ==
=== As actor ===
Year	Title	Role	Theatre
1959	Damn Yankees	Ensemble member	Rainbow Stage
1961	The Threepenny Opera	Ensemble member	Royal Manitoba Theatre Centre
1961	Mister Roberts	Ensemble member	Royal Manitoba Theatre Centre
1962	Macbeth	Ensemble member	Stratford Festival
1962	The Tempest	Various	Stratford Festival
1962	Cyrano de Bergerac	Ensemble member	Stratford Festival
1962	The Taming of the Shrew	Groom / Walter Sugarsop	Stratford Festival
1963	Troilus and Cressida	Margarelon	Stratford Festival
1963	The Comedy of Errors	Ensemble member	Stratford Festival
1963	Cyrano de Bergerac	Ensemble member	Stratford Festival
1963	Timon of Athens	Servilius	Stratford Festival
1964	Love's Labour's Lost	Longaville	Chichester Festival Theatre
1964	Richard II	Sir John Bushy	Stratford Festival
1964	The Country Wife	Ensemble member	Stratford Festival
1964	Le Bourgeois gentilhomme	Cléonte	Stratford Festival
1966	As You Like It	Orlando de Boys	Guthrie Theater
1966	The Skin of Our Teeth		Guthrie Theater
1966	S.S. Glencairn		Guthrie Theater
1968	The House of Atreus	Orestes	Guthrie Theater
1968	Twelfth Night	Feste	Guthrie Theater
1968	Serjeant Musgrave's Dance	Serjeant "Black Jack" Musgrave	Guthrie Theater
1969	Othello	Iago	Goodman Theatre
1969	Much Ado About Nothing		American Shakespeare Theatre
1969	Three Sisters		American Shakespeare Theatre
1969	Henry V	King Henry V	ANTA Theatre
1970–1972	Applause	Bill Sampson	Palace Theatre
1971	Cyrano de Bergerac	Christian de Neuvillette	Guthrie Theater
1971	The Taming of the Shrew		Guthrie Theater
1972	Night Watch	John Wheeler	Morosco Theatre
1972	A Midsummer Night's Dream	Oberon	Guthrie Theater
1973	Oedipus Rex	Oedipus	Guthrie Theater
1973	Sondheim: A Celebration	Various	Shubert Theatre
1973–1974	A Little Night Music	Fredrik Egerman	Majestic Theatre; Shubert Theatre
1974	King Lear	King Lear	Guthrie Theater
1975	Equus	Dr. Martin Dysart	Royal Manitoba Theatre Centre
1975	Cyrano de Bergerac	Cyrano de Bergerac	Royal Manitoba Theatre Centre
1977	A Sorrow Beyond Dreams	The Writer	Marymount Manhattan Theatre
1977	Cold Storage	Richard Landau	Lyceum Theatre
1979–1980	Sweeney Todd: The Demon Barber of Fleet Street	Sweeney Todd	Gershwin Theatre
1981	Coriolanus	Caius Marcius Coriolanus	Stratford Festival
1981	The Taming of the Shrew	Petruchio	Stratford Festival
1982	Julius Caesar	Marcus Brutus	Stratford Festival
1982	The Tempest	Prospero	Stratford Festival
1981–1983	Up from Paradise	God	Jewish Repertory Theater
1983	Dance a Little Closer	Harry Aikens	Minskoff Theatre
1983–1984	King Lear	King Lear	Citadel Theatre
1984–1985	Coriolanus	Caius Marcius Coriolanus	Stratford Festival
1984–1985	The Taming of the Shrew	Petruchio	Stratford Festival
1984–1985	Arms and the Man	Sergius Saranoff	Stratford Festival
1984–1985	The Tempest	Prospero	Stratford Festival
1984–1985	Julius Caesar	Marcus Brutus	Stratford Festival
1985	Traveler in the Dark	Sam	Mark Taper Forum
1985–1986	Master Class	Joseph Stalin	Citadel Theatre
1986	Master Class	Joseph Stalin	Union Square Theatre
1987	Teddy & Alice	President Theodore Roosevelt	Minskoff Theatre
1988	Ziegfeld	Florenz Ziegfeld	London Palladium
1989	Measure for Measure	Vincentio	Vivian Beaumont Theater
1989	The Anastasia Game	Gen. Alexei Bounine	Merrimack Repertory Theatre
1990–1993	Mountain	William O. Douglas	Ford's Theatre; Plays and Players Theatre Lucille Lortel Theatre
1991	The Speed of Darkness	Joe	Belasco Theatre
1992	A Touch of the Poet	Cornelius Melody	Long Wharf Theatre
1996	Papa	Ernest Hemingway	Douglas Fairbanks Theater
1996–1998	Show Boat	Cap'n Andy	Tour
1998	Paramour	General St. Pe	Old Globe Theatre
2000	Sweeney Todd: The Demon Barber of Fleet Street	Sweeney Todd	Royal Festival Hall
2000–2001	The Dinner Party	Andre Bouville	Mark Taper Forum
2001–2002	Copenhagen	Niels Bohr	National tour
2002	Funny Girl	Florenz Ziegfeld Jr.	New Amsterdam Theatre
2002–2003	Proof	Robert	Walter Kerr Theatre
2003	No Strings	Louis de Pourtal	New York City Center
2003	Rose and Walsh	Walsh	Geffen Playhouse
2003	The Persians	Darius the Great	National Actors Theatre
2003	Follies	Benjamin Stone	John Hancock Hall
2004	Kismet	Hajj	Reprise Theatre Company
2006	All My Sons	Joe Keller	Geffen Playhouse
2007	Heroes	Henri	Geffen Playhouse
2008	Frost/Nixon	President Richard Nixon	Canadian Stage Company
2009	Broadway Backwards 4	Various	Broadway Cares/Equity Fights AIDS
2010	Brigadoon	Mr. Lundie	Irish Repertory Theatre
2010	Broadway Backwards 5	Various	Broadway Cares/Equity Fights AIDS
2011	Broadway Backwards 6	Various	Broadway Cares/Equity Fights AIDS
2014	Guys and Dolls	Arvide Abernathy	Carnegie Hall
2016–2019	Broadway and the Bard	Himself	Lion Theatre, NYC; US and Canada National Tour
2019	Harry Townsend's Last Stand	Harry Townsend	New York City Center

=== As director ===
Year	Title	Theatre
1972	Of Mice and Men	Guthrie Theater
1974	The Petrified Forest	Guthrie Theater
1974	The Crucible	Guthrie Theater
1979	Don't Call Back	
1984	Death of a Salesman	
1985	Cold Storage	

== Filmography ==
=== Film ===
Year	Title	Role
1977	One Man	Jason Brady
1977	A Little Night Music	Fredrik Egerman
1978	Drying Up the Streets	Larry
1981	The Four Seasons	Nick Callan
1988	Lady in White	Phil Terragrossa
1994	Getting In	Dr. Lionel Higgs / Dr. Ezekiel Higgs
1995	Never Talk to Strangers	Henry Taylor
1996	Executive Decision	Secretary of Defense Charles White
2000	Thirteen Days	Dean Acheson
2002	About Schmidt	Ray Nichols
2004	Secret Window	Sheriff Dave Newsome
2005	The Greatest Game Ever Played	Stedman Comstock
2005	Boynton Beach Club	Jack
2006	Flags of Our Fathers	Mr. Beech
2007	1408	Joe Enslin
2008	The Onion Movie	Norm Archer
2013	Prisoners	Father Patrick Dunn
2015	Spotlight	Cardinal Bernard Law
2018	Death Wish	Ben Gibbs
2018	Bumblebee	Hank
2026	Wildwood	Richard (voice)

=== Television ===
Year	Title	Role	Notes
1963	Quest	Unknown	1 episode
1964	Festival	Ragnar	1 episode
1979	The Great Detective	Tanner	1 episode
1981	Madame X	John Abbott	Television film
1985	There Were Times, Dear	Bob Millard	Television film
1985	Surviving: A Family in Crisis	David Brogan	Television film
1985–1992	Murder, She Wrote	Michael Hagarty / Monsignore O'Shaugnessy	Recurring role
1989	The American Playwrights Theater: The One Acts	Pat Sweeney	1 episode
1990	Gabriel's Fire	Judge Norton Heller	1 episode
1991	Kurt Vonnegut's Monkey House	Ambassador Kelly	1 episode
1992	The Ray Bradbury Theater	Douglas	1 episode
1992	Street Legal	Christin Peveril	1 episode
1993	North of 60	Mike Birkett	1 episode
1993	Class of '61	Dr. Leland Peyton	Television film
1993	The Sea Wolf	Dr. Picard	Television film
1993–2008	Law & Order	Edgar Beezley / Mac Geller / Captain Allard Bunker	3 episodes
1994	Witness to the Execution	Jake Tyler	Television film
1994	Love on the Run	Noah Cross	Television film
1995–2000	The Outer Limits	Doc Wells / Father Anton Jonasceu	2 episodes
1996	Swift Justice	Al Swift	Main role
1996	The Summer of Ben Tyler	Spencer Maitland	Television film
1997	Star Trek: Voyager	Admiral Edward Janeway	1 episode
1997	F/X: The Series	Charles Emery	1 episode
1997	American Experience	Narrator	1 episode
1998	Mentors	Alexander Graham Bell	1 episode
1999	The Practice	Defense Attorney Weiland	1 episode
1999	In the Company of Spies	The President	Television film
2000	Nuremberg	Francis Biddle	Television film
2000	D.C.	Senator William Abbott	1 episode
2000	The West Wing	Pharmaceutical Executive	1 episode
2003	Ed	Mr. Stuckey	1 episode
2004	Sex Traffic	Magnus Herzoff	Miniseries
2005	Numb3rs	Alan Emrick	1 episode
2006–2007	Brotherhood	Judd Fitzgerald	Recurring role
2007	CSI: Crime Scene Investigation	Frank McCarty	1 episode
2008	Army Wives	Randall Meade	1 episode
2009	Into the Storm	Franklin D. Roosevelt	Television film
2009	Dominick Dunne's Power, Privilege, and Justice	Narrator	9 episodes
2010	Damages	Louis Tobin	5 episodes
2010–2024	Blue Bloods	Henry Reagan	Main role
2013	Wallander	Atkins	1 episode
2019	When They See Us	Robert Morgenthau	Miniseries
2026	American Classic	Linus Bean	7 episodes
2026	Boston Blue	Henry Reagan	Episodes: "Beautiful Broken Things" & "The Crash"

== Awards and nominations ==
On Broadway, Cariou has earned three Tony nominations for Best Actor in a Musica' in 1970 for Applause, in 1973 for A Little Night Music, and in 1979 for Sweeney Todd. He won the Tony for Best Performance By A Leading Actor in a Musical for his performance in Sweeney Todd.

In 2004, Cariou was inducted into the American Theater Hall of Fame. In 2009, Cariou portrayed Franklin D. Roosevelt in the HBO movie Into the Storm, earning an Emmy nomination for Outstanding Supporting Actor in a Miniseries or a Movie. On June 23, 2012, Cariou was honored by having his name added to the Miles Macdonell Collegiate Alumni of Distinction, for his contribution to theater and arts. His introduction to the theater started with a starring role in the school production of The Pirates of Penzance. He holds the Order of Manitoba. He was awarded the Honorary Degree of Doctor of Letters (D.Litt) by the University of Windsor on June 2, 1984. He received an Honorary Degree from the University of Winnipeg in 1992.

On December 27, 2018, Julie Payette, Governor General of Canada, announced that Cariou would be one of 103 recipients becoming an Officer of the Order of Canada for his achievements as an actor of stage and screen, and for his commitment to Canadian cultural institutions. He was invested with the Insignia of the Order of Canada on October 26, 2023 by Governor General of Canada Mary Simon. He also received the Canadian Version of the Queen Elizabeth II Golden Jubilee Medal in 2002.

Year	Award	Category	Work	Result
1970	Tony Award	Best Actor in a Musical	Applause	Nominated
1970	Theatre World Award		Applause and King Henry V	Honouree
1973	Tony Award	Best Actor in a Musical	A Little Night Music	Nominated
1977	Canadian Film Award	Best Actor	One Man	Won
1979	Tony Award	Best Actor in a Musical	Sweeney Todd	Won
1979	Drama Desk Award	Outstanding Actor In A Musical	Sweeney Todd	Won
1991	Outer Critics Circle Award	Outstanding Actor in a Play	Mountain	Nominated
1991	Outer Critics Circle Award	Outstanding Actor in a Play	The Speed of Darkness	Nominated
1991	Gemini Award	Best Actor in a Dramatic Program or Mini-Series	Kurt Vonnegut's Monkey House	Nominated
2002	Touring Broadway Awards	Best Actor in a Play	Copenhagen	Won
2009	Primetime Emmy Award	Outstanding Supporting Actor in a Miniseries or a Movie	Into the Storm	Nominated
2019	Drama League Award	Distinguished Performance	Harry Townsend's Last Stand	Nominated
