= Renée Taylor =

American actress (born 1933)

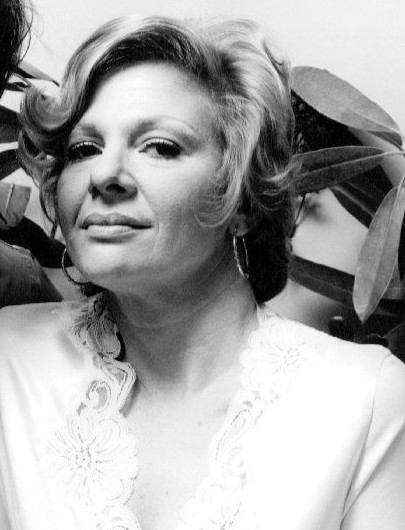
- Taylor in 1974
- Born: Renée Adorée Wexler; March 19, 1933 (age 93); New York City, U.S.
- Education: American Academy of Dramatic Arts
- Occupations: Actress; screenwriter; playwright; producer; director
- Years active: 1948–present
- Spouses: Frank Baxter (m. 1958; div. 1964) Joseph Bologna (m. 1965; died 2017)
- Children: 1 (Note: Although some sources have claimed that Taylor had two children with her second husband Joseph Bologna, the couple stated in a 1996 interview that they had only one child, a son. The other child who is claimed to be theirs, a daughter, is actually the wife of their son.)

Renée Adorée Taylor (born Wexler, March 19, 1933) is an American actress, screenwriter, playwright, producer and director. Taylor was nominated for an Academy Award for co-writing the screenplay for the film Lovers and Other Strangers (1970). She also played Sylvia Fine on the television sitcom The Nanny (1993–1999).

== Early years ==
Taylor was born on March 19, 1933, in The Bronx, New York City, to Frieda (née Silverstein), an aspiring actress, and Charles Wexler. Her mother named her after silent film actress Renée Adorée. She graduated from the American Academy of Dramatic Arts.

== Career ==
Taylor acted with improv groups in the 1950s. She worked as a comedian in the early 1960s at the New York City nightclub Bon Soir. Her opening act was a then-unknown Barbra Streisand. In 1967, Taylor played an actress portraying Eva Braun in Mel Brooks' feature film The Producers, a role she got while performing the play Luv with Gene Wilder, whom Brooks cast as protagonist Leo Bloom.

Taylor and husband Joseph Bologna co-wrote the Broadway hit comedy Lovers and Other Strangers, and received Academy Award nominations for writing the 1970 film adaptation. In 1971, the couple co-wrote and starred in the film Made for Each Other. Their screenplay received a nomination for the Writers Guild of America Award for Best Comedy. Taylor played Arlene Sherwood, co-producer of a television show along with Jerry Orbach and John Candy in the 1991 film Delirious.

From 1992 to 1994, Taylor played the overbearing Jewish mother of Brian Benben's lead character on the HBO series Dream On. In 1993, she was cast as the mother of Richard Lewis, and the ex-wife of Don Rickles, in the Fox sitcom Daddy Dearest, which was cancelled after a two-month run in the fall.

Also in 1993, Taylor appeared in the CBS sitcom The Nanny as Sylvia Fine, the mother of the titular character. After the cancellation of Daddy Dearest, Taylor was upgraded to a recurring cast member during the first season of The Nanny and eventually a full-time cast member by the third season. Her roles on the two broadcast network series in 1993 were concurrent with her work on Dream On.

Taylor is most often recognized for her role in The Nanny. Her character was intent on helping daughter Fran find a husband and had a passionate love for food. Taylor's husband, Joseph Bologna, made two guest appearances on The Nanny—first, as an egomaniacal actor named Allan Beck, who tormented Maxwell Sheffield (Charles Shaughnessy) and second, in the final season, as a doctor and admirer of Sylvia in the episode, "Maternal Affairs".

Between 2008 and 2012, Taylor guest-starred as Ted Mosby's neighbor, Mrs. Matsen, on How I Met Your Mother. She also had a guest-starring role on the Disney Channel series Shake It Up, portraying a cranky elderly woman, Mrs. Lacasio, in a retirement home. She also had a guest-starring role on the Nickelodeon series Victorious, as Robbie's cranky grandmother who wants to learn how to use the Internet.

In addition to her numerous guest-starring appearances, Taylor has worked as a voice-actor as the character Mrs. Start in the animated feature film Ice Age: The Meltdown, and in a recurring role as Linda's mother Gloria in the animated Fox series Bob's Burgers. Taylor also played Martha Benson in the film Opposite Day, released in 2009.

Taylor also appeared on Fran Drescher's series Happily Divorced as the best friend of Fran's mother. In 2011, Taylor was cast in Allen Gregory as Principal Gottlieb. In 2013, she starred in the Tyler Perry film Temptation: Confessions of a Marriage Counselor as Ms. Waco Chapman, the owner of Chapman Drug Company.

In 2016, Taylor starred in the Netflix film The Do-Over with Adam Sandler as the role of Mrs. Kessler and in the TV show Rock in a Hard Place. Taylor followed that with an appearance in the 2017 film How to Be a Latin Lover.

Taylor had a role in Tango Shalom, in which she acted alongside her husband, Joseph Bologna in his final film role before his death. The film was released theatrically in North America on September 3, 2021, and on VOD and DVD in North America on October 29, 2021. Beginning July 25, 2018, Taylor appeared in My Life on a Diet at the Off-Broadway Theatre at St. Clement's, written with Bologna. After two extensions, she took the production on tour across the U.S.

== Personal life ==
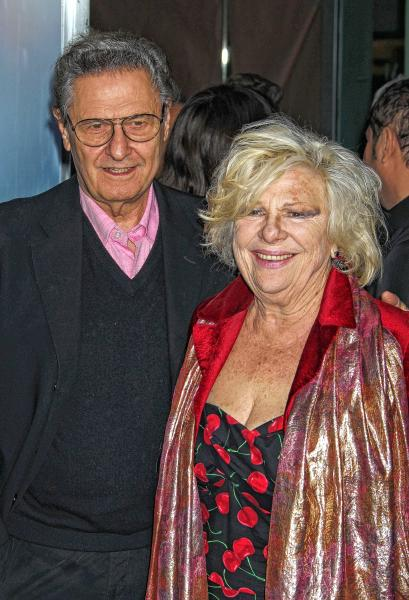
Taylor with husband Joseph Bologna in 2012

Taylor's first marriage was to Frank Baxter, whom she married in 1958; the couple had divorced by 1964.

Taylor married actor Joseph Bologna on August 7, 1965, in Stamford, Connecticut. They had a son, filmmaker, Gabriel who directed his parents in the last film they starred in together, Tango Shalom. They were married until Bologna's death in August 2017.

Taylor is Jewish.

== Filmography ==
=== Film ===
Year	Title	Role	Notes
1958	The Mugger	Mac's wife	
1961	The Errand Boy	Miss Giles	
1961	A Bowl of Cherries	Party goer	Short Film
1966	A Fine Madness	Myrna	
1967	The Producers	Eva Braun	
1968	The Detective	Rachael Schoenstein	
1970	Lovers and Other Strangers	—N/a	Writer
1971	A New Leaf	Sharon Hart	
1971	Jennifer on My Mind	Selma Rottner	
1971	Made for Each Other	Pandora	Also writer
1972	Last of the Red Hot Lovers	Jeanette	
1983	Lovesick	Mrs. Mondragon	
1989	It Had to Be You	Theda Blau	Also director and writer
1990	The End of Innocence	Angel	
1990	White Palace	Edith Baron	
1991	Delirious	Arlene Sherwood	
1991	All I Want for Christmas	Sylvia	
1992	Forever	Charlotte Shelby	
1996	Love Is All There Is	Mona	Also director and writer
2001	Dr. Dolittle 2	Female Tortoise	Voice
2001	Dying on the Edge	Lottie Minnow	
2002	Returning Mickey Stern	Jeannie	
2003	Gold Diggers	Betty Mundt	
2004	Alfie	Lu Schnitman	
2005	Boynton Beach Club	Woman on Cell Phone	
2006	Ice Age 2: The Meltdown	Mrs. Start	Voice
2006	Kalamazoo?	Golda	
2006	A-List	Mrs. Smigley	
2007	Dancin' on the Edge	"Adult" Eloise Brown	Short film
2008	The Rainbow Tribe	Ms. Crappie	
2009	Life During Wartime	Mona	
2009	Opposite Day	Martha Benson	
2010	Boston Girls	Mrs. Palermo	
2011	When Harry Met Sally 2 with Billy Crystal and Helen Mirren	Uncredited	Short film
2012	Should've Been Romeo	Tillie	
2012	Rose's Diet	Rose	Short film; also producer
2012	Driving Me Crazy: Proof of Concept	Doris Brown	
2013	Temptation: Confessions of a Marriage Counselor	Ms. Waco Chapman	
2014	Zarra's Law	Gabriella Zarra	
2016	The Do-Over	Mrs. Kessler	
2017	How to Be a Latin Lover	Peggy	
2020	The Pack Podcast	Stella / Debby	
2021	Tango Shalom	Deborah Yehuda	Also producer

=== Television ===
Year	Title	Role	Notes
1963	The Defenders	Mrs. Thorpe	Episode: "Judgement Eve"
1964	The Reporter	Myrna	Episode: "Rope's End"
1968	The Joan Rivers Show	Herself	Episode: "Mrs. Parkinson's Law"
1973	Calucci's Department	Mrs. Woods	Creator / Writer / Actor "Life Is an Anchovy" (Actor); Writer (3 episodes)
1973	Acts of Love and Other Comedies	—N/a	Television film, writer
1974	Paradise	Marilyn / Carmel / Madeline	Television film, also writer
1975	Fay	Marian	Episode: "Mr. Wonderful"
1975	Three for Two	—N/a	Television film, writer
1976	Woman of the Year	Tess Harding	Television film, also writer
1977	Good Penny	Penny	Television film, also writer
1977	Forever Fernwood	Annabelle Kearns	Television film
1980	A Cry for Love	—N/a	Television film, writer
1983	Matt Houston	Sheila Baer	Episode: "The Showgirl Murders"
1983	Lottery!	Sylvia Berman	Episode: "Being a Winner"
1983	Lovers and Other Strangers	—N/a	Television film; writer and producer
1984	Bedrooms	Host / Riva / Wendy	Television film; also director, writer, and producer
1984	St. Elsewhere	Dr. Charlotte Miller	2 episodes
1986	The Love Boat	Monica Douglas	Episode: "Happily Ever After/Have I Got a Job for You/Mr. Smith Goes to Minikulu"
1986	Tales from the Darkside	Pearl King	Episode: "A Serpent's Tooth"
1987	The New Hollywood Squares	Herself (Panelist)	2 episodes
1988	Win, Lose or Draw	Herself (Contestant)	Episode: "10.17.1988"
1989	Heartbeat	Unknown role	Episode: "From Russia with Love"
1990	Thirtysomething	Electra Rosebloom	Episode: "The Guilty Party"
1992	Empty Nest	Anne	Episode: "The Mismatchmaker"
1992	Carol Leifer: Gaudy, Bawdy & Blue	Mrs. Himmelfarb	Television film
1992–1994	Dream On	Doris Tupper	Recurring role (6 episodes)
1993	Daddy Dearest	Helen Mitchell	Series regular (13 episodes)
1993–1999	The Nanny	Sylvia Fine	Recurring role (94 episodes)
1996	Lois & Clark: The New Adventures of Superman	Roweena Johnson	Episode: "Oedipus Wrecks"
1996	Caroline in the City	Mrs. Fox	Episode: "Caroline and the Therapist"
1996	Jeopardy!	Herself (Celebrity Contestant)	Episode: "1996 Celebrity Jeopardy! Game 5"
1997	A Match Made in Heaven	Isobel Slotkin	Television film
1997	Superman: The Animated Series	Lucille	Voice, episode: "Warrior Queen"
1998	The Simple Life	Sylvia Fine	Episode: "The Other Mother"
1999	Hollywood Squares	Herself (Panelist)	Recurring role (5 episodes)
2001	100 Deeds for Eddie McDowd	Phyllis	Episode: "Matchmaking Mutt"
2001	61*	Claire Ruth	Television film
2004	Eve	Ms. Berkowitz	Episode: "Valentine's Day Reloaded"
2005	Everwood	Betty Barrett	Episode: "Piece of Me"
2005	Early Bird	unknown role	Television film
2007	Pandemic	Kathryn Hadorn	Miniseries
2007	The Wedding Bells	Gladys Miller	Episode: "For Whom the Bells Toll"
2008	Biography	Herself (Interviewee)	Episode: "Jude Law"
2009–2012	How I Met Your Mother	Mrs. Matsen / Mrs. Matson	Recurring role (3 episodes)
2010	Law & Order: Special Victims Unit	Maude Monahan	Episode: "Bedtime"
2010	Victorious	Mammaw	Episode: "The Birthweek Song"
2010	Sonny with a Chance	unknown role	Episode: "Random Acts of Disrespect"
2010–2012	Shake It Up	Mrs. Locassio	Recurring role (3 episodes)
2011	Allen Gregory	Judith Gottlieb	Series regular (4 episodes)
2011	Celebrity Ghost Stories	Herself	Episode: "Joan Osborne/Ahmad Rashad/Renee Taylor/Mia Tyler"
2011–2012	Happily Divorced	Marilyn	Recurring role (5 episodes)
2011–2023	Bob's Burgers	Gloria Genarro	Voice, 5 episodes
2012	2 Broke Girls	Hinda Gagel	Episode: "And the Kosher Cupcakes"
2012	Natasha Mail Order Bride Escape to America	Eunice	Television film
2013	Beverly Hills Broke	Renee	Television film; also writer and executive producer
2015	Weird Loners	Nana	Miniseries, episode: "Weird Dance"
2016	Rock in a Hard Place	Mimi	Unknown episode(s)
2017	Young & Hungry	Mrs. Shapiro	Episode: "Young & Couchy"
2021	Debris	Hasmat #4	Episode: "Asalah"

== Stage ==
=== As an Actor ===
Year	Title	Role	Notes
1962	Pal Joey	Melba Snyder	Warwick Musical Theatre
1962	Pal Joey	Melba Snyder	Oakdale Musical Theatre
1962	Pal Joey	Melba Snyder	Carousel Theatre
1964	Luv	Ellen Manville (Standby)	Booth Theatre, Broadway
1966	Agatha Sue, I Love You	Sheila	Henry Miller's Theatre, Broadway
1968	Lovers and Other Strangers	Wilma	Brooks Atkinson Theatre, Broadway
1981	It Had to Be You	Theda Blau	John Golden Theatre, Broadway
1988	The Grandma Plays	Pearl Berman	Vineyard Theatre, Off-Broadway
2001	If You Ever Leave Me...I'm Going with You!	Performer	Cort Theatre, Broadway
2004	Cinderella	The Queen	New York City Opera, Off-Broadway
2018	My Life on a Diet	Herself	Theatre at St. Clement’s, Off-Broadway
2018	My Life on a Diet	Herself	National Tour
2025	Dying is No Excuse	Herself	Berkshire Theatre Group

=== As a Playwright ===
Year of Premiere	Title	Notes
1968	Lovers and Other Strangers	Brooks Atkinson Theatre, Broadway
1981	It Had to Be You	John Golden Theatre, Broadway
1981	Bea, Frank, Richie and Joan	Reston Community Players
1998	Barry, Betty and Bill	Herman Fine Arts Center
1999	Bermuda Avenue Triangle	Act II Playhouse
2001	If You Ever Leave Me...I'm Going with You!	Cort Theatre, Broadway
2018	My Life on a Diet	Theatre at St. Clement’s, Off-Broadway
2018	My Life on a Diet	National Tour
2018	Mr. Lewis and Mrs. Wexel	St. Martin's Church
2025	Dying is No Excuse	Berkshire Theatre Group

== Accolades ==
The following is a list of awards and nominations received by Renee Taylor:

Association	Year	Nominated work	Category	Results	Ref
Academy Awards	1971	Lovers and Other Strangers	Best Adapted Screenplay	Nominated	
Emmy Awards (Primetime)	1973	Acts of Love and Other Comedies	Outstanding Writing Achievement in Comedy, Variety or Music (shared with Joseph Bologna)	Won	
Emmy Awards (Primetime)	1974	Paradise	Outstanding Writing in Comedy-Variety, Variety or Music (shared with Joseph Bologna)	Nominated	
Emmy Awards (Primetime)	1996	The Nanny	Outstanding Supporting Actress in a Comedy Series	Nominated	
Writers Guild Awards	1971	Lovers and Other Strangers	Best Comedy Adapted from Another Medium (shared with Joseph Bologna & David Zelag Goodman)	Nominated	
Writers Guild Awards	1972	Made for Each Other	Best Comedy Written Directly for the Screen (shared with Joseph Bologna)	Nominated	
