= Made for Each Other (1971 film) =

1971 film by Robert B. Bean

- Theatrical release poster
- Directed by: Robert B. Bean
- Written by: Renée Taylor; Joseph Bologna
- Produced by: Roy Townshend
- Starring: Renée Taylor; Joseph Bologna
- Cinematography: William Storz
- Edited by: Sonny Mele
- Music by: Trade Martin
- Production company: Wylde Films
- Distributed by: 20th Century Fox
- Release date: December 12, 1971
- Running time: 101 minutes
- Country: United States
- Language: English
- Box office: $1.5 million (US/ Canada)

Made for Each Other is a 1971 American romantic comedy film directed by Robert B. Bean, in his sole film directing credit.

Both starring and written by the husband and wife team of Renée Taylor and Joseph Bologna, the film traces the relationship of Pandora and Giggy, a seemingly incompatible couple who meet in a group therapy session and fall in love.

The film was the second screenplay written by the couple (Lovers and Other Strangers being their first), and is also Bologna's film debut. In addition, there are early screen appearances from Paul Sorvino, Candice Azzara and Olympia Dukakis.

== Plot ==
On Christmas Eve, Guido “Gig” Panimba (Joseph Bologna) and Pandora “Panda” Gold (Renée Taylor) each morosely wander the streets of Manhattan and later join an emergency group therapy meeting designed to help the participants break self-destructive patterns. Each person lists his or her neuroses, ranging from bed-wetting to paranoia.

When it is Panda's turn, we learn she is there on her 4th emergency session. She declares herself a failure as an actress, singer, dancer and woman, and launches into a long description of her life and many disastrous love affairs. We learn about Panda's past, in which her mother repeatedly assures her that she will be famous while her father repeatedly abandons them for affair after affair. To escape her unhappy home life, young Panda immerses herself in Hollywood movies, often imitating movie stars such as Rita Hayworth. By the time she is nineteen, Panda tries to attract her father's attention by displeasing him, and to that end moves in with a married, Chinese boyfriend. When her father learns of this, he dies of a heart attack, and at the funeral, his many lovers hysterically blame Panda for his demise. Her next boyfriend ends up leaving her for another man. She works as a hostess of a television quiz show and a nightclub performer, but she gives up both professions to go live in England with her latest boyfriend, whom she caught sleeping with two other women. Panda then enthusiastically announces her "comeback" at an upcoming cabaret revue and invites everyone in the session to come and see her.

Gig, a newcomer to therapy, claims that he has no problems, and when the other participants goad him to be honest, he gets up to leave. Within minutes, however, he returns and announces that he caused his last girlfriend to attempt suicide. Gig recounts his past. He has little privacy from his parents and sisters and is made to feel guilty about his sexual urges. After his mother convinces him that love requires purity, and lust must be violently purged, Gig begins to treat women cruelly and eventually tries to join the seminary, but is soon caught in a tryst with a maid. Gig briefly joins the military, where he embraces an enemy soldier in joy upon learning that the man is not dead. Returning to America, Gig fails to prosper in his father's barbershop and instead goes back to college, where his African studies major horrifies his parents. He then embarks on relationship after relationship, leaving each woman in heartbreak until the latest, tried to kill herself.

At the meeting, some of the women berate him but Panda is sympathetic. After the session, Gig and Panda get to talking and end up having sex in his car. While having sex, Panda accidentally blurts out that she loves him, after the encounter, Gig responds coldly and dismisses her. After some encouragement from the doctor who ran the session, Panda calls Gig in an attempt to scold him for his treatment of her, but she ends up inviting him to dinner. There, he enjoys the food but then readies to leave, promising to return later to have sex after the party he's going to. As he walks out the door, Panda screams after him that she will no longer accept being treated poorly. After she collapses on her bed, he returns silently and asks what they should do next.

Gig reluctantly agrees to Panda's suggestion that they move in together, hoping to break his pattern of abusiveness. Gig finds he is able to really open up to Panda and he playfully helps Panda to overcome her inability to achieve orgasm. On New Year's Eve, Panda's mother appears, reminding Panda that she is late for her night club comeback. Ignoring her mother's disapproval of Gig, Panda rushes to prepare for her act and insists that Gig join them. He is appalled, however, by her act, a painfully amateurish song-and-dance number in which she asks the audience to create a new identity for her. Later, when she asks his opinion, he admits he did not understand it, prompting her mother to lash out at him. Panda asks her to leave, and later at a café asks Gig for more constructive criticism. Upon learning that she has worked on the show for five years, Gig explodes that the act is awful and states that she embarrassed herself and him. Panda runs out and Gig follows, but on the street they fight and ultimately go their separate ways. Panda goes home alone and realizes her act is actually awful and that Gig was right. Meanwhile, Gig tries to sleep with another woman only to find himself impotent with her.

The next day, Panda shows up at Gig's apartment and they make up. Learning that he is going to visit his parents, she insists on joining him, and on the way urges him to introduce her as his girl friend. Gig's large family seems welcoming to Panda until they ask how she met Gig and she responds with a long story about their encounter group and the necessity of escaping the psychological wounds inflicted by their parents. Soon, Gig's mother is screaming at her to leave and Gig shouts back that she must apologize to Panda. She concludes that she will not attend their wedding because Panda is Jewish and her views are so different from their own. Gig's father chastises her for overreacting and declares that they're just having fun, and clearly Gig would never marry Panda. To prove Panda is not Gig's type, he brings out a photo of Gig's first love, a slim Italian teenager. This visibly upsets Gig who decides to get up and leave with Panda, while his family screams after them.

In the car, Gig starts to pick apart his parents, and their comments about Panda. However, Panda tells him that some of their comments about her (particularly her physical features) were accurate. This causes Gig to fly into a rage, because she's agreeing with his parents after all the nasty things they said, so he begins to berate her as well, eventually breaking up with her and forcing her to get out of the car. Panda walks off, but Gig immediately follows her. Eventually, after a lot of arguing, the two break down crying and Gig admits he really loves Panda and the two decide to get engaged.

== Cast ==
- Adam Arkin as Young Gig
- Renée Taylor as Pandora Gold
- Joseph Bologna as Giggy Panimba
- Paul Sorvino as Mr. Panimba
- Olympia Dukakis as Mrs. Panimba
- Helen Verbit as Mrs. Gold
- Louis Zorich as Mr. Gold
- Norman Shelly as Dr. Furro
- Candice Azzara as Sheila
- Peggy Pope as Group member

== See also ==
- List of American films of 1971
