= With Honors (film) =

1994 American film by Alek Keshishian

- Theatrical release poster
- Directed by: Alek Keshishian
- Written by: William Mastrosimone
- Produced by: Amy Robinson; Paula Weinstein
- Starring: Joe Pesci; Brendan Fraser; Moira Kelly; Patrick Dempsey; Josh Hamilton; Gore Vidal
- Cinematography: Sven Nykvist
- Edited by: Michael R. Miller
- Music by: Patrick Leonard
- Production company: Spring Creek Productions
- Distributed by: Warner Bros. Pictures
- Release date: April 29, 1994
- Running time: 103 minutes
- Country: United States
- Language: English
- Box office: $20 million

With Honors is a 1994 American comedy-drama film directed by Alek Keshishian. It stars Brendan Fraser as a Harvard University student who finds himself at the mercy of the demands of a homeless man (Joe Pesci) when he holds his senior thesis paper hostage. Moira Kelly, Patrick Dempsey, Josh Hamilton, and Gore Vidal also star. The film was released on April 29, 1994, received generally negative reviews from critics, and grossed $20 million.

== Plot ==
Montgomery "Monty" Kessler is a senior majoring in Government at Harvard University and sharing a house with friends: art student Courtney, womanizing radio disc jockey Everett, and neurotic medical student Jeff.

While Monty is working on his senior thesis, which takes a pessimistic view of citizens on public assistance, a power outage ruins his computer's hard drive. When he rushes out to print a backup copy of his thesis, he trips on the street, breaking his ankle, and drops the thesis down a grate and into the boiler room under Widener Library. There he finds a homeless man, resembling the writer Walt Whitman, burning his thesis. He calls the campus police, who arrest the man but are unable to recover the thesis.

In court, Monty learns that the man's name is Simon Wilder. Although Simon gets the worst of the charges dismissed, he is held in contempt, for which Monty pays the fine. Despite Simon's anger over Monty having him arrested, they work out a deal: for every service Monty provides, Simon will return one page of his thesis. Monty takes Simon to the house, where he lets him stay in a broken-down van in the backyard.

Over time, Monty and Simon become close friends. Monty confides in him about his absent father, and Simon helps him see poor people like himself as human beings. He also shows Monty his collection of stones, each one representing a significant memory from his life.

Monty's roommates like the arrangement as well, with Courtney appreciating Monty's newfound open-mindedness and Everett giving Simon wine in exchange for repairing the van. However, Jeff refuses to let Simon stay in the house's basement on a cold night in case of his parents visiting. When Monty lies about why he can't come in the house, Simon ends their deal and leaves.

While everyone goes home for Christmas vacation, Monty stays to recompose his thesis. Simon sends a friend to deliver the thesis; he reveals where Simon is staying but says he does not want to see him. Monty finds him living on the street, coughing and wheezing due to years of exposure to asbestos in the U.S. Merchant Marine.

Monty allows Simon to live in the house and refuses his offer of a new deal. Simon gets disability benefits to help with the rent while Monty decides to rewrite his thesis. Courtney and Everett are supportive of Simon moving in, but Jeff is still unwelcoming.

Realizing the seriousness of his illness, Simon writes his obituary, which reveals that he left his wife and child to join the Merchant Marines. Though initially angry, Monty forgives him, taking him as his guest to a campus pajama party. As Monty watches Courtney dance with another man, Simon encourages him to confess his love for her. Courtney reciprocates, and they begin a relationship.

Monty agrees to drive Simon to visit Frank, the son he abandoned, despite the fact that doing so will delay the completion of his thesis. All the roommates, including Jeff, who has come to see Simon's humanity, make the long drive. Frank rebuffs his apology and pretends that he doesn't know him when Simon's granddaughter asks who he is. Before leaving, a heartbroken Simon adds a stone to his collection.

Simon's condition deteriorates on the drive back to the house; the roommates stay up all night reading Walt Whitman to him before he dies. At his funeral, Monty reads Simon's obituary where he refers to the roommates as his family and states that he "will graduate life with honor and without regret."

Monty meets with his haughty mentor, Professor Pitkannan, and explains why he changed his thesis to a more optimistic subject. Pitkannan accepts his explanation but informs him that he will not graduate with honors due to his lateness. Monty thanks him for his mentorship. He also returns the Walt Whitman book to Widener Library, symbolically leaving Simon's spirit there.

The roommates graduate, and Monty begins his own collection of memory stones.

== Cast ==
- Joe Pesci as Simon B. Wilder
- Brendan Fraser as Montgomery "Monty" Kessler
- Moira Kelly as Courtney Blumenthal
- Patrick Dempsey as Everett Calloway
- Josh Hamilton as Jeffrey Hawkes
- Gore Vidal as Professor Pitkannan
- James Deuter as Judge
- Mara Brock Akil as Ms. Moore
- Shanesia Davis as Dr. Cecile Kay
- Claudia Haro as Marty

== Production ==
The film was shot at various locations in Illinois, Indiana, Minnesota, and Massachusetts, including the Harvard University campus in Cambridge, Massachusetts. The exterior of Winthrop House appears, but the interiors pictured are not that of actual Harvard houses, and the last scene of the movie was shot at the University of Illinois at Urbana-Champaign. The buildings and surroundings were dressed up to look as if it were Harvard and many of the people in the final scene are Illinois students. The graduation scene was shot while the local climate in Illinois had not allowed for the trees to bloom leaves and so artificial branches and leaves were stapled on. All of the outdoor shots of Harvard's Widener Library had the University of Minnesota's Northrop Auditorium in that role. The scene in which Simon Wilder and Professor Pitkannan debate the role of the president in American democracy was filmed in Lincoln Hall at Northwestern Law School.

== Soundtrack ==
With Honors: Music from the Motion Picture

Soundtrack album by Various Artists
- Released: March 22, 1994
- Labels: Maverick; Warner Bros.
- Producer: Various Artists

Singles from With Honors (Music from the Motion Picture)
- 1. "I'll Remember" Released: March 8, 1994

Professional ratings
Review scores
Source	Rating
AllMusic	3/5 stars
Music Week	3/5 stars

The soundtrack was released on March 22, 1994, by Maverick Records and Warner Bros. Records. It contains the U.S. No. 2 hit single and theme song "I'll Remember" by pop singer Madonna. She received nominations from the Golden Globes, Grammys, and MTV Movie Awards.

Seattle grunge band Mudhoney were asked to contribute a track to the soundtrack. In the liner notes from their compilation March to Fuzz written by the band, "They sent us a clip from the movie With Honors of some jock running through the snow with EMF's hit "Unbelievable" scoring the action. They said they were looking for an upbeat song like that for this part of the film. We told them that we had a bitchin' little instrumental that might work. They insisted on a song with words. So, I put some words on it and we sent down both versions, figuring they'd have to choose the instrumental. They didn't." The song, "Run Shithead Run," is included on the soundtrack but Mudhoney claims they never got another such request.

The Pretenders' cover of Bob Dylan's "Forever Young" was later included on their album Last of the Independents in addition to Free Willy 2: The Adventure Home as one of the two versions of the same song that was played in the film, the other being by Rebbie Jackson.

Duran Duran's "Thank You" also appeared in Encomium: A Tribute to Led Zeppelin and their 1995 album of the same name. Unlike the soundtrack version, the former album contained the shorter version while the full version appeared in the latter album.

1. "Thank You" – Duran Duran
2. "I'll Remember (Theme from With Honors)" – Madonna
3. "She Sells Sanctuary" – The Cult
4. "It's Not Unusual" – Belly
5. "Cover Me" – Candlebox
6. "Your Ghost" – Kristin Hersh and Michael Stipe
7. "Forever Young" – The Pretenders
8. "Fuzzy" – Grant Lee Buffalo
9. "Run Shithead Run" – Mudhoney
10. "Tribe" – Babble
11. "Blue Skies" – Lyle Lovett
12. "On the Wrong Side" – Lindsey Buckingham

== Reception ==
=== Critical response ===
On the review aggregator website Rotten Tomatoes, 22% of 27 critics' reviews are positive, with an average rating of 4.2/10. The website's consensus reads: "While it's admittedly well-meaning, With Honors handles its themes in strictly remedial fashion." Audiences surveyed by CinemaScore gave the film an average grade of "A–" on an A+ to F scale.

Caryn James of The New York Times wrote: "The well-meaning plot about homelessness turns out to be the insufferable part, but the appealing actors who play the four roommates give the film a casual charm." Peter Travers of Rolling Stone praised the cast, saying: "Fraser and Kelly make appealing foils; they deserve to do more than sponge up life lessons from the man they once dismissed as a bum." Roger Ebert of the Chicago Sun-Times gave the film 2.5 stars out of 4, praising the acting, but criticizing the "clichéd" plot.

=== Box office ===
The film grossed $4.3 million in its opening weekend, finishing in second, and then topped the box office in its sophomore weekend with $3.7 million.

Desson Howe of The Washington Post listed the film as his 9th-worst of 1994.
