= Brief Encounter =

1945 British film directed by David Lean

- Theatrical release poster
- Directed by: David Lean
- Screenplay by: Noël Coward; Anthony Havelock-Allan; David Lean; Ronald Neame
- Based on: Still Life; 1936 play by Noël Coward
- Produced by: Noël Coward; Anthony Havelock-Allan; Ronald Neame
- Starring: Celia Johnson; Trevor Howard; Stanley Holloway; Joyce Carey; Cyril Raymond
- Cinematography: Robert Krasker
- Edited by: Jack Harris
- Music by: Sergei Rachmaninoff
- Distributed by: Eagle-Lion Distributors
- Release date: 26 November 1945 (London premiere)
- Running time: 87 minutes
- Country: United Kingdom
- Language: English
- Budget: $1 million or $1.4 million

Brief Encounter is a 1945 British romantic tragedy film directed by David Lean from a screenplay by Noël Coward, based on his 1936 one-act play Still Life.

Starring Celia Johnson, Trevor Howard, Stanley Holloway, and Joyce Carey, the film follows a passionate extramarital relationship in England shortly before World War II. The protagonist is Laura, a married woman with children, whose conventional life becomes increasingly complicated after a chance meeting at a railway station with a married stranger with whom she subsequently falls in love.

The film premiered in London on 13 November 1945. It went to general release on 25 November, to widespread critical acclaim. It received three nominations at the 19th Academy Awards, Best Director, Best Actress (for Johnson), and Best Adapted Screenplay.

Many critics, historians, and scholars cite the film as one of the greatest of all time. In 1999, the British Film Institute ranked it as the second-greatest British film of all time. In 2017, a Time Out poll of 150 actors, directors, writers, producers, and critics ranked it the 12th-best British film ever.

== Plot ==
In a railway station refreshment room, a man and a woman are sitting glumly at a table. One of the woman's friends comes in and immediately begins chatting away. After some terse pleasantries, the man leaves to catch his train. The woman explains that the man is about to move to Africa. After the man leaves, the woman abruptly disappears but soon returns, explaining that she wanted to see the express train pass by. After a short interval, the two women head for their own train.

At home, Laura Jesson, the woman at the table, sits in the living room with her husband Fred. Laura silently reflects on her recent experiences, which she retells in the form of a confession to her husband.

Laura visits Milford every week to shop and watch a matinée film. During one such outing she meets idealistic doctor Alec Harvey, who works at the local hospital on Thursdays. Alec charms her by gently removing a piece of grit from her eye.

Laura continues visiting Milford on Thursdays. The following week, she runs into Alec on the street. The week after that, they eat lunch and watch a film together. Although they are both married with children, their innocent, casual relationship begins to deepen. The situation makes them uneasy, though they admit they love each other.

Laura (Celia Johnson) and Alec (Trevor Howard) say their penultimate goodbyes at the railway station

Laura and Alec continue meeting in public until they unexpectedly run into some of Laura's friends, necessitating the first of many deceptions. Eventually, they agree to make love at the flat of Alec's friend Stephen, who has dinner plans. However, Stephen returns unexpectedly. Stephen overhears Laura sneaking out and subtly chides Alec for his infidelity. A distraught Laura wanders the streets for three hours until a concerned police officer urges her to go home.

At the railway station, Laura and Alec admit that their relationship is unworkable. For the sake of his family, Alec decides to end his relationship with Laura by taking a job in Johannesburg.

The next week, Laura and Alec have their final meeting in the railway station refreshment room, as previously shown in the opening scene. As they prepare to part for the last time, Laura's acquaintance Dolly Messiter interrupts them, oblivious to their anguish.

Alec's train arrives before they can say a proper goodbye. He discreetly squeezes Laura's shoulder as he departs. Laura, overcome with emotion, nearly commits suicide by jumping in front of an express train. However, she gathers herself and returns home to her family.

At home, Fred acknowledges Laura's emotional distance, though whether he knows the cause remains unclear. He thanks her for coming back to him and she weeps in his arms.

A parallel subplot involves the interactions of the station and refreshment room staff. Two of the staff flirt with each other but cannot engage in public displays of affection during work hours, which humorously contrasts with Laura and Alec's ability to meet openly with each other and inability to have a relationship outside of work hours.

== Cast ==
- Celia Johnson as Laura Jesson
- Trevor Howard as Dr. Alec Harvey
- Stanley Holloway as Albert Godby, the ticket inspector
- Joyce Carey as Myrtle Bagot, the cafe owner
- Cyril Raymond as Fred Jesson
- Everley Gregg as Dolly Messiter
- Margaret Barton as Beryl Walters, tea-room assistant
- Marjorie Mars as Mary Norton
- Alfie Bass (uncredited) as the waiter at the Royal
- Wallace Bosco (uncredited) as the doctor at Bobbie's accident
- Sydney Bromley (uncredited) as Johnnie, second soldier
- Noël Coward (uncredited) as the railway station announcer
- Nuna Davey (uncredited) as Hermionie Rolandson, Mary's cousin
- Valentine Dyall (uncredited) as Stephen Lynn, Alec's friend
- Irene Handl (uncredited) as cellist and organist
- Richard Martin (uncredited) as Bobby Jesson, Fred and Laura's son
- Henrietta Vincent (uncredited) as Margaret Jesson, Fred and Laura's daughter

== Adaptation ==
The film is based on Noël Coward's one-act play Still Life (1936), one of ten short plays in the cycle Tonight at 8.30, designed for Gertrude Lawrence and Coward himself, to be performed in various combinations as triple bills. All scenes in Still Life are set in the refreshment room of the fictional Milford Junction railway station.

As is common in films based on stage plays, the film depicts places only mentioned in the play: Dr. Lynn's flat, Laura's home, a cinema, a restaurant and a branch of Boots the Chemist. Several scenes are not in the play: a scene on a lake in a rowing boat where Dr Harvey gets his feet wet; Laura wandering alone in the dark, sitting down on a park bench, smoking in public and being confronted by a police officer; and a drive in the country in a hired car.

Some scenes are made less ambiguous and more dramatic in the film. The scene in which the two lovers are about to commit adultery is toned down: in the play, it is left for the audience to decide whether they actually consummate their relationship; in the film, it seems that they do not. In the film, Laura has only just arrived at Dr Lynn's flat when the owner returns and is immediately led out by Dr Harvey via the kitchen service door. Later, when Laura seems to want to throw herself in front of an express train, the film makes the intention clearer using voice-over narration.

Also, in the play, the characters at the Milford station—Mrs. Baggot, Mr. Godby, Beryl, and Stanley—are very much aware of the growing relationship between Laura and Alec, and sometimes mention it in an offhand manner; in the film, they take barely any notice of them or what they are doing. The final scene of the film, showing Laura embracing her husband after he shows that he has noticed her distance in the past few weeks and perhaps even guessed the reason, is not in the original Coward play.

There are two editions of Coward's original screenplay for the film adaptation, both listed in the bibliography.

== Production ==
Much of the film was shot at Carnforth railway station in Lancashire, then a junction on the London, Midland and Scottish Railway. While a busy station, it was far enough away from major cities to avoid the blackout for film purposes, allowing shooting to take place in early 1945 before World War II had ended. At two points in the film, platform signs indicate local destinations such as Leeds, Bradford, Morecambe and Lancaster, even though Milford is intended to be in the home counties. Noël Coward provided the station announcements in the film. The station refreshment room was recreated in a studio. Carnforth station retains many of the period features from the time of filming and has become a place of pilgrimage for fans of the film. Some of the urban scenes were shot in London, Denham, and Beaconsfield, near Denham Studios.

The country bridge the lovers visit twice, including on their final day, is Middle Fell Bridge at Dungeon Ghyll in Cumbria.

The poem that Fred asks Laura to help him with for his crossword is by John Keats: "When I have Fears that I may Cease to Be". The quote Fred recites is "When I behold, upon the night's starr'd face, huge cloudy symbols of a high romance".

In addition to the Keats reference, there is a visual reference to an Arabic love poem. In Dr Lynn's apartment, a wall hanging is prominently displayed twice. When Laura enters, there is a shot of it over the dining table. Later, when Stephen confronts Alec, it is seen over Alec's left shoulder.

The original choice for the role of Alec Harvey was Roger Livesey, but David Lean cast Trevor Howard after seeing him in The Way to the Stars. Joyce Barbour was originally cast as Dolly, but Lean was dissatisfied with her performance, and she was replaced by Everley Gregg.

== Music ==
Excerpts from Sergei Rachmaninoff's Piano Concerto No. 2 recur throughout the film, performed by the National Symphony Orchestra under Muir Mathieson, with Eileen Joyce as the pianist. Additionally, there is a scene in a tearoom where a salon orchestra plays Spanish Dance No. 5 (Bolero) by Moritz Moszkowski.

== Release ==
=== Box office ===
According to trade papers, Brief Encounter was a "notable box-office attraction".

=== Critical reception ===
Brief Encounter was acclaimed upon release although there were doubts that it would be "generally popular". Variety praised the film, stating, "Coward's name and strong story spell nice US chances."

It was a moderate success in the UK and became a major hit in the US, leading to Johnson's nomination for the Academy Award for Best Actress.

The New York Times review was approving: "Of all the recent offerings in the show-shops, it is definitely one of the best. And that is because it does the one thing which so few of our films ever do; it tells a believeable human story in a straight and believeable way. It's the barest wisp of a story….and the love afair is of the simplest—just a couple of harmless rendezvous in which the two have luncheon together, go to the movies, and take a modest country drive. It is only a tentative meeting in the apartment of an absent friend (who happens to come home early) that makes them see the impossibility of love and compels them to the ultimate parting (which initiates the flash-back telling of the tale)….Indeed, it is in the decency and obvious futility of their love, hedged in by all the conventions of society and domesticity, that is lodged the heart of the drama. For Mr. Coward's little story simply says that our drab lives are governed most by loyalties; we but surrender now and then to hopeless dreams."

The Chicago Tribune concurred: "An elegy for a lost love, 'Brief Encounter' is an artistic and sensitive film of a superior sort. By its very simplicity and lack of glamor, the story has a realism that is deeply touching….Celia Johnson makes her Laura a winning person, and Trevor Howard's Dr. Harvey is equally personable. Neither is particularly good looking, a fact which enhances the appeal and reality of the sad little story. They are just ordinary people, living an old, old story, but they have character and conscience, and you will not forget them easily."

Today, the film is widely praised for its black-and-white photography and the mood created by the steam-age railway setting, both of which were particular to the original David Lean version. On review aggregator Rotten Tomatoes, the film holds an approval rating of 91% based on 46 reviews, with an average rating of 8.60/10. The website's critical consensus reads: "Brief Encounter adds a small but valuable gem to the Lean filmography, depicting a doomed couple's illicit connection with affecting sensitivity and a pair of powerful performances." On Metacritic, it has a weighted average score of 92 out of 100 based on 16 critics, indicating "universal acclaim".

=== Awards and nominations ===
Award	Category	Nominee(s)	Result	Ref.
Academy Awards	Best Director	David Lean	Nominated	
Academy Awards	Best Actress	Celia Johnson	Nominated	
Academy Awards	Best Screenplay	Anthony Havelock-Allan, David Lean, and Ronald Neame	Nominated	
Cannes Film Festival	Grand Prix du Festival International du Film		Won	
National Board of Review Awards	Top Ten Films		4th Place	
New York Film Critics Circle Awards	Best Actress	Celia Johnson	Won	

== Legacy ==
In her book Noël Coward (1987), Frances Gray says that Brief Encounter is, after the major comedies, the one work of Coward that almost everybody knows and has probably seen; it has featured frequently on television and its viewing figures are invariably high.

Its story is that of an unconsummated affair between two married people [....] Coward is keeping his lovers in check because he cannot handle the energies of a less inhibited love in a setting shorn of the wit and exotic flavour of his best comedies [....] To look at the script, shorn of David Lean's beautiful camera work, deprived of an audience who would automatically approve of the final sacrifice, is to find oneself asking awkward questions (pp. 64–67).

Brief Encounter holds a 91% "fresh" rating at review aggregator Rotten Tomatoes. In 1999 it came second in a British Film Institute poll of the top 100 British films. In 2004, the magazine Total Film named it the 44th greatest British film of all time. Derek Malcolm included the film in his 2000 column The Century of Films. The British historian Thomas Dixon notes that Brief Encounter "has become a classic example of a very modern and very British phenomenon—weeping over the stiff upper lip, crying at people not crying. The audiences for these wartime weepies could, through their own tears, provide something that was lacking in their own lives as well as those of the on-screen stoics they admired."

The British play and film The History Boys features two of the main characters reciting a passage of the film. (The scene portrayed, with Posner as Johnson and Scripps as Raymond, is in the closing minutes of the film where Laura begins, "I really meant to do it.")

Director Robert Altman's wife Kathryn Altman said, "One day, years and years ago, just after the war, [Altman] had nothing to do and he went to a theater in the middle of the afternoon to see a movie. Not a Hollywood movie: a British movie. He said the main character was not glamorous, not a babe. And at first he wondered why he was even watching it. But twenty minutes later he was in tears, and had fallen in love with her. And it made him feel that it wasn't just a movie." The film was Brief Encounter.

The episode "Grief Encounter" of the British comedy series Goodnight Sweetheart features the Coward character and shoots a similar scene in Milford railway station. Mum's Army, an episode of Dad's Army, also seems loosely inspired by Brief Encounter.

Brief Encounter serves as a plot device in Mrs. Palfrey at the Claremont, a 2005 comedy-drama film based on the 1971 novel by Elizabeth Taylor. The aging widow Mrs. Palfrey reminisces that Brief Encounter was her and her deceased husband's favorite film, which leads her young friend, the writer Ludovic Meyer, to meet and bond with his eventual girlfriend.

In the 2012 Sight & Sound polls of the world's greatest films, Brief Encounter received the votes of 11 critics and three directors.

== Social context ==
Frances Gray acknowledges a common criticism of the play: why do the characters not consummate the affair? Gray argues that their problem is class consciousness: the working classes can act in a vulgar way, and the upper class can be silly, but the middle class is, or at least considers itself, the moral backbone of society—a notion whose validity Coward did not really want to question or jeopardise, as the middle classes were his principal audience.

But in her narration, Laura stresses that what holds her back is her horror at the thought of betraying her husband and her morals, tempted though she is by the force of her feelings. Indeed, this very tension has made the film such an enduring favourite.

The values Laura precariously, but ultimately successfully, clings to were widely shared and respected (if not always observed) at the time of the film's original setting (the status of a divorced woman, for example, remained sufficiently scandalous in the UK to cause Edward VIII to abdicate in 1936). Updating the story might have left those values behind and with them vanished the plot's credibility, which may be why the 1974 remake could not compete.

The film was released amid the social and cultural context of the Second World War, when 'brief encounters' were considered commonplace and women had far greater sexual and economic freedom than before. In British National Cinema (1997), Sarah Street argues that "Brief Encounter thus articulated a range of feelings about infidelity which invited easy identification, whether it involved one's husband, lover, children or country" (p. 55). In this context, feminist critics read the film as an attempt at stabilising relationships to return to the status quo.

In his 1993 BFI book on the film, Richard Dyer notes that owing to the rise of homosexual law reform, gay men also saw the characters' plight as comparable to their own social constraints in forming and maintaining relationships. Sean O'Connor considers the film an "allegorical representation of forbidden love" informed by Coward's experiences as a closeted gay man.

== Further adaptations ==
=== Radio ===
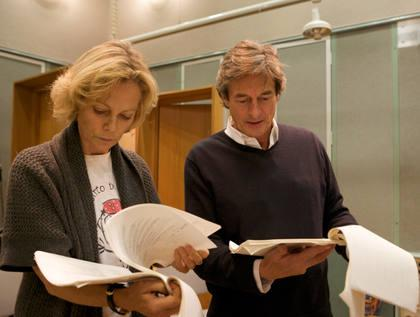
Jenny Seagrove and Nigel Havers rehearsing

Brief Encounter was adapted as a radio play on 20 November 1946 episode of Academy Award Theater, starring Greer Garson. It was presented three times on The Screen Guild Theater, on 12 May 1947 with Herbert Marshall and Lilli Palmer, on 12 January 1948 with Marshall and Irene Dunne, and on 11 January 1951 with Stewart Granger and Deborah Kerr. It was also adapted to Lux Radio Theater on 29 November 1948 with Garson and Van Heflin and on 14 May 1951 with Olivia de Havilland and Richard Basehart.

On 30 October 2009, as part of the celebrations for the 75th anniversary of the BBC's Maida Vale Studios, Jenny Seagrove and Nigel Havers starred in a special Radio 2 production of Brief Encounter, performed live from Maida Vale's studio 6 (MV6). The script used was a 1947 adaptation for radio by Maurice Horspool, which had been in the BBC's ownership and had never been used or performed since then. In addition, there were two Theatre Guild on the Air broadcasts of Brief Encounter in its original form, Still Life. The first version aired on 6 April 1947 over ABC with Ingrid Bergman, Sam Wanamaker and Peggy Wood. The second one was presented over NBC on 13 November 1949 and starred Helen Hayes and David Niven.

=== TV ===
- In 1961 it was adapted for television with Dinah Shore and Ralph Bellamy.
- A 1974 television remake of the film, shown in the US on the Hallmark Hall of Fame, starred Richard Burton and Sophia Loren, but was not well received.

=== Theatre ===
The first adaptation of Brief Encounter to source both the screenplay and Coward's original stage material was adapted by Andrew Taylor and starred Hayley Mills. The first national tour took place in 1996 and later transferred into the West End (Lyric Theatre, Shaftesbury Avenue) in 2000 starring Jenny Seagrove.

Emma Rice/Kneehigh Theatre adaptation

The Kneehigh Theatre production, produced by David Pugh and Dafydd Rogers, was adapted for the stage and directed by Emma Rice and is a mixture of the film and the stage play, with additional musical elements. It premiered at Birmingham Repertory Theatre in October 2007 and the West Yorkshire Playhouse later that month before opening in February 2008 at the Haymarket Cinema in London, which was converted into a theatre for the play. The 2008 London cast included Amanda Lawrence and Tamzin Griffin, with Tristan Sturrock and Naomi Frederick in the lead roles. The production ran until November 2008 and then toured the UK for 27 weeks from February to July 2009, with venues including the Oxford Playhouse, Marlowe Theatre and the Richmond Theatre and with the two leads played by Hannah Yelland and Milo Twomey. The US premiere at the American Conservatory Theater in San Francisco, CA ran from September to October 2009. The adaptation was performed in Brooklyn, New York, at St. Ann's Warehouse in December 2009 and January 2010 and at the Guthrie Theater in Minneapolis in February–April 2010.

A Roundabout Theatre Company production of the Kneehigh adaptation opened at Studio 54 in New York City on 28 September 2010 starring Hannah Yelland, Tristan Sturrock, and other members of the London cast. The limited engagement closed on 2 January 2011, after 21 previews and 119 performances, including a four-week extension.

After an Australian tour in the autumn of 2013, Kneehigh's production of Brief Encounter appeared at the Wallis Annenberg Center in Beverly Hills and the Shakespeare Theater in Washington in the spring of 2014.

The production returned to the UK, opening at Birmingham Repertory Theatre (where the production originally premiered) and The Lowry, Salford, in February 2018 before returning to the Haymarket Cinema in London from March to September 2018.

=== Opera ===
In May 2009 Houston Grand Opera premiered the two-act opera Brief Encounter based on the film's story, with music by André Previn from a libretto by John Caird.

== See also ==
- BFI Top 100 British films
- Meghamalhar
- List of films featuring fictional films
