= Cate Caplin =

American dancer and choreographer

- Born: Charlottesville, VA, U.S.
- Education: Sidwell Friends School and continuing education at Columbia University, NYU, UCLA and Yale University
- Occupations: Choreographer; Dancer; Producer; Director; Writer; Educator
- Relatives: Mortimer Caplin (father); Ruth Sacks Caplin (mother); Lee Caplin (brother); Michael Caplin (brother); Jeremy Caplin (brother)

Cate Caplin is an American dancer, choreographer, writer and theater and film director.

== Early life and education ==
Born Catherine Jean Caplin on March 29 in Charlottesville, VA to Mortimer Caplin, a prominent tax attorney and founder of Caplin & Drysdale, and screenwriter, Ruth Sacks Caplin. she was one of five siblings including her older brother Lee Caplin, the film producer. Caplin's family had moved from New York in 1951 when Mortimer accepted a professorship at the University of Virginia School of Law. In 1961, hers father was appointed Commissioner of Internal Revenue under the Kennedy Administration, and the family again relocated to Washington, DC. Caplin at this time attended Sidwell Friends School. Caplin spent many summers at the Interlochen Arts Camp in Interlochen, Michigan Caplin then trained at the Washington Ballet and furthered her studies at the Royal Academy in London. During high school, she lived with her grandmother in New York City, where she continued her dance education while balancing academic pursuits.

== Career ==
Caplin's professional career began with North Carolina Dance Theatre and Ballet West. She later transitioned to musical theater, studying at HB Studio and the Strasberg Institute. Her Broadway debut came with the American Dance Machine. At 19, she worked with renowned dancer François Szony, whose mentorship greatly influenced her theatrical style. Caplin's Broadway career included a revival of West Side Story as well as a number of Yiddish musicals. She was also involved in regional theatre productions.

A pivotal moment came when her brother, Lee Caplin, the film producer, invited her to Los Angeles. After enduring several cold winters in New York City and battling bouts of pneumonia, Caplin embraced the Californian sunshine and relocated to California where she immersed herself in the theatre community as a director, writer, and producer while continuing to book roles in television and film. She wrote, produced and directed some of her own plays and took two of them to the Edinburgh Festival.

Caplin continued to dance professionally and completed a 22-city tour with Disney's Symphonic Fantasy as Princess Jasmine, performing "A Whole New World" from the Hollywood Bowl to the Metropolitan Opera House in New York City. She also excelled in competitive ballroom dancing. Over her competitive career she won thirty-four Regional and International Ballroom Dance Championships including becoming a four-time US Open Champion, and a three-time World Champion in Theatrical Show Dance.

As a producer, director and choreographer, Caplin's work spans television, film, music videos, commercials, and theatrical venues worldwide from the Paris Opera House to the Broadway Stage. Caplin has made notable contributions to television and film, including choreographing for five episodes of Frasier and General Hospital, as well as a tango for Port Charles.

For her work in theatre, Caplin has been recognised with several awards including in 2004 the Garland Award for her choreography of Grand Hotel, in which she also performed at the Colony Theatre in Burbank. She also has received a Women in Theatre Red Carpet Award in 2004, as well as an Ovation Award in 2011 for her work on Fascinating Rhythms for the Rubicon Theatre Company Other awards include an Award of Excellence from the LA Film Commission for her work as a writer, director, choreographer and producer and in 2019 the Playwright's Arena presented Caplin with the Lee Melville Award for Outstanding Contribution to the Los Angeles Theatre Community.
