= Edwin S. Cohen =

American tax attorney

Edwin Samuel Cohen (September 27, 1914 – January 13, 2006) was a prominent American tax attorney best known for serving in the Nixon Administration as the Assistant Treasury Secretary for Tax Policy and, later, Under Secretary of the Treasury. In addition to time spent in government service and private practice, he taught tax and corporate law as a tenured professor at his alma mater, the University of Virginia School of Law.

== Early and personal life ==
In 1914, Cohen was born in Richmond, Virginia to Leroy and Miriam Cohen—both of whom were of Bavarian descent. Cohen's family was of relatively affluent means, partially owning and operating the Cohen Company department store in Richmond. He started school at the age of 7, and in his childhood would attend Miss Susie Slaughter's School for Little Boys and McGuire's University School, leading his classes at both. At McGuire, Cohen was classmates with future Supreme Court Justice Lewis F. Powell. He began to play tennis in his teenage years, and continued to do so in college.

In 1929, 15 year-old Cohen enrolled as a freshman at the University of Richmond. In addition to serving as the captain of the university's club tennis team during his senior year, Cohen served on the editorial board of the Richmond Collegian, later becoming its editor-in-chief as a junior.

Despite receiving a C− in an undergraduate commercial law course and consequently questioning his legal future, Cohen graduated Phi Beta Kappa from the University of Richmond in 1933 and enrolled at the University of Virginia School of Law in the same year, starting at the age of 18. During this period he served on the editorial board of the Virginia Law Review. He graduated from the law school in 1936 and entered private practice in New York City at Sullivan & Cromwell LLP. Cohen's first partner, Carlyn Ladenberg Cohen, died in 1942. He later remarried to Helen Herz Cohen.

== Professional career ==
Cohen began his career at Sullivan & Cromwell LLP, where he served as an associate from 1936 to 1949 and primarily worked on tax matters. Shortly after starting at the firm, he began to assist in advising clients on the Revenue Act of 1936. At the firm, Cohen worked directly with John Foster Dulles and future CIA Director Allen Dulles. During his time at Sullivan & Cromwell, Cohen also worked on matters pertaining to investment companies, and drafted portions of statutory language later enacted in the Revenue Act of 1942. During his tenure at Sullivan & Cromwell, Cohen and several other associates inquired about purchasing a controlling stake in the New York Giants baseball team, but the group ultimately failed.

In 1949, Cohen left S&C to become a named partner at Root, Barrett, Cohen, Knapp & Smith—a firm started by his former law school classmate, Orin Root. Here, he also worked aside fellow named partner and future S.D.N.Y. District Judge Whitman Knapp. He became a member of the Tax Forum in 1951, an influential lecture circuit.

Cohen began to lecture on tax-related matters in the early 1940s, including at the New York University School of Law. In 1963, Cohen was offered a visiting professorship at the University of Virginia School of Law, later becoming a full-time faculty member. During his tenure, he was appointed to the Joseph M. Hartfield academic-chair position.

Cohen declined consideration for a judgeship on the U.S. Tax Court early in his teaching career, but he did serve on President Lyndon B. Johnson’s Task Force to Improve the World-Wide Competitive Effectiveness of American Business and the Advisory Group to the Commissioner of Internal Revenue, then serving Commissioner Sheldon Cohen. During his time at Virginia, Cohen continued to consult on various tax matters pertaining to, among others, the NFL-AFL merger and revisions to the Virginia state income tax so that it conformed to its more-simplified federal counterpart.

In February 1969, President Richard Nixon appointed Cohen as the Assistant Secretary for Tax Policy in the U.S. Department of Treasury. In this position, Cohen would play a key role in drafting the Tax Reform Act of 1969. Here, he would employ his former student and emeritus Yale Law School professor emeritus Michael Graetz. Figures provided in part by Cohen influenced Congressional enactment of the Employee Retirement Income Security Act (ERISA). In his Treasury role, Cohen also represented the United States on the Fiscal Committee of the Organisation for Economic Co-operation and Development (OECD).

Cohen also served as an advisor to Treasury Secretary John B. Connally at the 1971 International Monetary Conference. Secretary Connally later tapped Cohen to serve as Under Secretary of the Treasury. After being confirmed to the position in June 1972, he was sworn in by Justice Lewis F. Powell.

Citing Connally's autobiography, Cohen stated in his memoir, A Lawyer’s Life, that his involvement in developing tax policy with John Ehrlichman, former White House counsel, caused or contributed to Secretary Connally's eventual resignation. According to Connally's autobiography, Ehrlichman was attempting to circumvent the Secretary on tax policy within the jurisdiction of the Treasury Department, and in doing so, attempted to hide Cohen's consultation from the department, unbeknownst to Cohen himself. In 1973, Cohen joined Covington & Burling LLP as a partner in the firm's Washington, D.C. office while continuing to teach part-time at the University of Virginia School of Law.

During this period, Cohen assisted in funding the start-up of the Virginia Tax Review at the law school. In his private capacity, Cohen also served as Chairman of the Chamber of Commerce’s Tax Committee and external tax counsel to the Investment Company Institute, which represents the interests of the mutual fund industry. Cohen became a professor emeritus at the University of Virginia in 1985 and senior counsel at Covington & Burling in 1986.

== Legacy ==
Edwin S. Cohen died on January 13, 2006, and was, at the time, survived by his wife, Helen Cohen, and three children: Edwin C., Roger, and Wendy S. Cohen. Cohen’s posthumous ties to the University of Virginia School of Law remain strong. Each year, the University of Virginia School of Law presents to the most outstanding graduating tax student the Edwin S. Cohen Tax Prize. The law school later established an endowed chair in Cohen’s name, titled the Edwin S. Cohen Distinguished Professorship of Law and Taxation. Professor emeritus George Yin, a former Chief of Staff to the Congressional Joint Committee on Taxation, was the first holder of the Cohen Chair. The title is currently held by Ruth Mason, who is member to the American Law Institute, the U.S. national reporter to the International Fiscal Association, and on the editorial board of the World Tax Journal.

Cohen is remembered for his enduring contributions to national tax institutions, including the Tax Forum, and has received multiple awards recognizing his efforts. These include the Treasury’s top honor, the Alexander Hamilton Award, and the American Bar Association’s distinguished service award. He is also remembered fondly for his tax poetry. In one such piece of poetry, Cohen wrote of the “marriage penalty,” a tax-code technicality favoring married partners with dissimilar amounts of earned income, that:

"When a boy meets a girl and they determine to wed,

They are not likely to think of the taxes ahead.

If one earns the wages and other's keeping house,

On the 15th of April each is happy as a spouse.

But if both are earners and their income's the same,

They'll find it's been costly to share the same name."
