= Mrs. Palfrey at the Claremont (novel) =

1971 novel written by Elizabeth Taylor

- First Chatto & Windus edition cover
- Author: Elizabeth Taylor
- Published: 1971 (Chatto & Windus); 1982 (Virago Press)
- Publication place: England
- Media type: Print
- Pages: 205
- ISBN: 0701117826
- OCLC: 227596

Mrs. Palfrey at the Claremont is a novel by Elizabeth Taylor. Published in 1971, it was her eleventh novel. It was shortlisted for the 1971 Booker Prize. The novel was adapted for television in 1973 and was the basis for a 2005 film, also called Mrs. Palfrey at the Claremont.

== Plot ==
In 1960s London, the recently-widowed Laura Palfrey moves into the Claremont Hotel, where she joins a group of other elderly hotel residents. She has a daughter in Scotland and a grandson, Desmond, who lives in London and works at the British Museum. Having told the other residents that she has a grandson who will be visiting her, she is embarrassed by his failure to do so.

One afternoon she slips and falls on the pavement. Ludo Myers, a young man who lives in a basement apartment, sees her fall and helps her, taking her in, bandaging her cut leg, and calling a taxi to take her home. Ludo is an impoverished aspiring novelist who spends his days writing in the Banking Hall at Harrods in order to save money on heat. To thank him, Mrs. Palfrey invites Ludo to dinner at the Claremont the following week.

When she tells the waiter at the Claremont she is expecting a guest for dinner on Saturday, one of the other residents overhears and assumes that the visitor will be Mrs. Palfrey's grandson Desmond. Rather than correct her, Mrs. Palfrey seeks out Ludo at Harrods and asks him to pretend to be her grandson. The dinner is a success and Ludo and Mrs. Palfrey become friends, although he is also interested in her as a source for a novel he is writing.

Eventually, prompted by his mother, the real Desmond reluctantly goes to visit Mrs. Palfrey, who manages to hide his identity from the other residents and discourages him from returning, telling him that she cannot receive visitors at the Claremont.

One of the other residents, Mr. Osmond, invites Mrs. Palfrey to a Masonic Ladies' Night, where he makes her a proposal of marriage. Shocked and astonished, she refuses his proposal. Several days later, Mrs. Palfrey falls on the steps leaving the Claremont and is taken to hospital in an ambulance. Coincidentally, Desmond arrives soon after, having been again sent by his mother, and the residents do not believe him to be Mrs. Palfrey's grandson.

Ludo, who has also been to the Claremont and heard of the accident, visits Mrs. Palfrey in hospital, where he arranges for her to have a private room and brings her some of her personal possessions. Mrs. Palfrey develops pneumonia and dies in her sleep after a last visit from Ludo. The following day Ludo finishes writing his novel, whose title, They Weren't Allowed to Die There, is based on a remark Mrs. Palfrey made to him about the Claremont Hotel.

== Major themes ==
Writing in the New Statesman in 1971, Kingsley Amis identified "loneliness, old age and approaching death" as the main subjects of the book. While their material circumstances are relatively comfortable, the elderly Claremont residents are subject to loneliness and boredom, and depend on family visits to prove to themselves and others that they have not been abandoned by their loved ones.

The plot centres on Mrs. Palfrey's lie, in which she pretends that Ludo is her grandson. She is drawn into this deception by the need to show the other residents that she is not alone. It is uncharacteristic of her, as "since early childhood, she had not lied at all except on her husband's behalf" and these were social lies for purposes such as getting him out of cocktail parties, "which he abhorred". She had already made some similarly face-saving excuses on behalf of Desmond for his failure to visit, such as illnesses and trips abroad, which can be seen as "more akin to the good manners she never shies away from" than to deliberate lying.

A common theme in Taylor's work is the relation of an artist to others, which is often presented as exploitative. In this case the artist is Ludo, who uses his observations of Mrs. Palfrey to write his novel. Amis describes Taylor's presentation of Ludo's motives as "scrupulously balanced" between affection, boredom, and delight in finding her "such marvellous material, and also unintentionally funny."

== Publication history ==
Mrs. Palfrey at the Claremont was published in 1971 in hardcover by Chatto & Windus in the United Kingdom and The Viking Press in the United States. It was published in paperback by Virago Press in 1982 as part of the Virago Modern Classics series, with an introduction by Paul Bailey. In that introduction Bailey reveals that he was Taylor's inspiration for the character Ludo Myers. In May 2016 Virago reissued the novel on the occasion of the 45th anniversary of its original publication, with a new introduction by Sarah Waters. In 2021 The New York Review of Books reissued Mrs. Palfrey at the Claremont with an introduction by Michael Hofmann in its New York Review of Books Classics series.

== Literary significance and reception ==
Mrs. Palfrey at the Claremont received favourable reviews on its publication. Kingsley Amis described it as a "continuously fascinating novel, always pushing the reader one way and another", and emphasized its humour despite the seemingly grim subject matter. The Washington Post reviewer noted the "fastidious distance" with which Taylor avoided sentimentality in her descriptions of the lonely hotel residents. The Times singled out the individuality of the characters, and remarked that Taylor's humour effectively balanced the pathos of the subject matter.

In a 1973 essay about Elizabeth Taylor's work in the New Statesman Paul Bailey described Mrs. Palfrey at the Claremont as both her "funniest" and "saddest" book, "deeply upsetting" but "a joy to read" because of the way in which the story is told, and compared her to Chekhov. In 2015 the writer and editor Robert McCrum placed Mrs. Palfrey at the Claremont 87th in a chronological list of "100 best novels in English" published in The Guardian.

== Awards and nominations ==
Mrs. Palfrey at the Claremont was shortlisted for the 1971 Booker Prize, which was won by V. S. Naipaul's In a Free State.

== Adaptations ==
An adaptation of the novel written by Ray Lawler and directed by Michael Lindsay-Hogg was broadcast on the BBC One series Play for Today in October 1973. Celia Johnson won the British Academy Television Award for Best Actress for her performance as Mrs. Palfrey.

A film adaptation written by Ruth Sacks Caplin and directed by Dan Ireland was released in 2005, with Joan Plowright in the role of Mrs. Palfrey.

An abridged serialization of the novel read by Eleanor Bron was broadcast on the BBC Radio 4 series Book at Bedtime in August 2018.
