= Cinsyla Key =

Anglo-French actress

- Education: Université libre de Bruxelles; London Academy of Music and Dramatic Art
- Occupation: Actress
- Years active: 2003–present
- Website: cinsylakey.com

Cinsyla Key is an Anglo-French actress of Irish descent. She has appeared in such films as Angel (2007), Mr Nobody (2009), The Invader (2011), and Erased (2012).

== Early life and career ==
Exposed to the world of performing arts from an early age, Cinsyla Key started auditioning for local singing/dance competitions and theatre companies at the age of seven, with success, and appeared in a series of educational theatre tours dedicated to Moliere's work.

After receiving an arts degree from the Université libre de Bruxelles, she came back to performing arts through a first MA collaborating with the Royal Conservatory of Brussels, where she directed her courses to film performances analysis. From that point she gradually pursued acting. While appearing briefly in international feature films, she took back the road of auditions and academies in Ireland and Britain, worked with the theatre director Andrew Visnevski on his Royal Academy of Dramatic Art workshop, until getting her chance at the London Academy of Music and Dramatic Art in 2007 where she attended a summer Shakespeare course before having been offered a place on its renowned PG (Dip) Classical acting. There she got her first meaningful acting experiences by playing Shakespearean characters and developing a particular interest in James M. Barrie, Edgar Allan Poe and unusual parts.

Today, as an active member of the British Actors' Equity, affiliated to Spotlight and legally represented in London by Lee & Thompson, she has already grabbed a variety of acting work in theatre and film. She has worked with directors Alain Berliner, François Ozon, Eric Emmanuel Schmitt, Jaco Van Dormael and Martin McDonagh, and appeared next to actors such as Billy Boyd, Sam Neill, Diane Kruger, Jared Leto, Sarah Polley and Aaron Eckhart, to name but a few. She lately associated her name with the next Philipp Stölzl's production, Erased, and concept photo shoots connected to fashion campaigns launched in the UK and France by top fashion designers.

== Selected stage/film credits ==
- 2006: L'Avare, Sophie D'Hondt, L'Envol Theatre, France.
- 2006: Frozen commercial by Christophe Navare, Irene Productions.
- 2007: Huis Clos, Theatre au Vert, France.
- 2007: Romeo and Juliet, Matt Peover, Linbury Studio, London.
- 2007: Air France commercial by Christophe Campos, Terra Nova Productions.
- 2007: Angel by François Ozon, Fidelite Productions.
- 2007: Gone For a dance by Alain Berliner, Artemis Productions.
- 2007: A Midsummer Night's Dream, Matt Peover and Peter James, Linbury Studio, London.
- 2008: Quality Street, Liliane Larien, Brussels Shakespeare Society - Scarabeus Theatre [Brussels], McOwan Theatre [London].
- 2008: A Shadow Behind the Door by Pierre Joassin, Nelka Films.
- 2008: As You Like It, Michael green, McOwan Theatre, London.
- 2008: In Bruges by Martin McDonagh, Focus Features.
- 2009: Mr Nobody by Jaco Van Doormael, Climax Films.
- 2011: Glenn The Flying Robot by Marc Goldstein, Singing Tress Entertainment.
- 2011: The Invader by Nicolas Provost, Versus Productions.
- 2012: Erased by Philipp Stölzl, Informant Films Europe.
- 2013: Pyaar by Stuart Tanner, Ruby Star Productions.
- 2013: Between Worlds by Patrick Read Johnson, Ruby Star Pictures.
- 2013: Triptych, Voltage Pictures.
- 2014: The Price of Desire, EG Film Productions.
