= Enjoy (play) =

1980 play by Alan Bennett

- Original language: English
- Written by: Alan Bennett
- Characters: 6.
- Genre: Dark comedy
- Setting: Back-to-back house in Leeds

Premiere
- Date: 15 October 1980
- Place: Vaudeville Theatre, London

Enjoy is a British comedy play written in 1980 by Alan Bennett. An idiosyncratic view of working-class family life in Leeds, a city in the north of England, it was one of the rare theatrical flops in Bennett's career.

An elderly couple living in one of the last back-to-back houses in Leeds encounter a series of jolting surprises, not least when their son returns, as a council official in drag, and reveals that the council intends to demolish their house brick by brick, and reassemble it in the local museum, complete with its occupants.

Following a national tour, directed by Ronald Eyre, it opened at the Vaudeville Theatre, in London's West End on 15 October 1980, but in spite of the stellar cast of Joan Plowright, Colin Blakely, Susan Littler, Marc Sinden, Philip Sayer and Liz Smith (who replaced Joan Hickson during rehearsals), it closed on 6 December 1980.

Twenty-nine years later, a new production of Enjoy toured and then moved to the Gielgud Theatre in January 2009. This time the play was described as "an astonishingly prescient, blackly comic modern classic". Starring Alison Steadman and David Troughton, it reportedly took over £1 million in advance ticket sales.
