= A Wreath of Roses =

1949 novel by Elizabeth Taylor

- First edition (UK)
- Author: Elizabeth Taylor
- Cover artist: Raymond Russell
- Language: English
- Published: 1949
- Publisher: Peter Davies (UK); Alfred A. Knopf (US)
- Media type: Print
- ISBN: 1844087123

A Wreath of Roses is a novel by Elizabeth Taylor published in 1949.

It was republished in 2011 by Virago Press with an introduction by Helen Dunmore (ISBN 9781844087129).

== Plot synopsis ==
While visiting Frances and Liz, spinster Camilla becomes entangled with a vaguely sinister man she met on the train journey. Liz is struggling with motherhood and the demands of her marriage to a clergyman. Camilla feels her life is dull and uninteresting and the aged Frances has radically changed her painting style due to her increasingly cynical outlook on the world. Camilla finds herself infatuated with the man in spite of her initial mistrust. Her involvement proves unwise and eventually chilling.

== Reception ==
In a 1949 book review in Kirkus Reviews the review summarised; "Affecting in its drama, expert in its execution, this is for the discerning reader." In reviewing the 2011 reissue, Jane Houshman of the Guardian called it a "marvellous, dark novel" and "The writing is so perfectly pitched that one almost resents becoming aware of the novel's elegant structure unfolding itself towards completion."

== Adaptation ==
Granada Television adapted the book for a TV movie production. It aired in 1987 on the ITV network in the UK, starring Joanna McCallum, Fabia Drake and Trevor Eve. The movie was directed by John Madden and written by Elizabeth Taylor and Peter Prince.
