= Helen Herz Cohen =

Helen Herz Cohen (1912 – March 23, 2006) was the Director of Camp Walden, an all-girls residential summer camp located in Denmark, Maine. She founded The Main Idea, an annual nonprofit camp for economically disadvantaged girls.

== Biography ==
Helen Herz Cohen was the niece of one of the founders of Camp Walden, and spent many summers working there as a camp counselor and then head counselor. She became the Director in 1938, at the age of 26. She later became the owner of Camp Walden and remained its Director until 1995.

Helen Herz Cohen died on March 23, 2006. She was 93 years old. Her husband, Edwin S. Cohen, tax expert and former Assistant Treasury Secretary for Tax Policy during the Nixon Administration, had died in earlier that year in January. The Cohens were survived by their two sons, Edwin C. of Manhattan and Roger of Denmark, Maine; their daughter, Wendy S. Cohen of Charlottesville, Virginia; and their two grandchildren.

== Awards and honors ==
The Maine Youth Camping Association presented Helen Herz Cohen with the Halsey Gulick Award in 1991. She received many other awards and honors throughout her lifetime and was even interviewed by Barbara Walters on national television.

== Camp Walden ==
Camp Walden was founded in 1916, shortly after the first Girl Scout camp and Camp Fire Girls camps began, at the very end of the Progressive Era in the United States. American summer camps were part of a trend in the country to return to nature, which included the rise of the national park system, the growth of urban parks, and the spread of the American suburbs.

Helen Herz Cohen's camping philosophy encouraged confidence, feelings of self-worth, and independence in the decades of campers that attended under her leadership. Affectionately referred to as "Miss Herz" and "HHC" by Waldenites throughout the years, she built a deeply connected alumnae group through her strong influence. She maintained contact with Walden alumnae for decades, often acting as a role model to former Walden campers. Miss Herz taught her Waldenites that all females have opportunities for education and leadership. She believed that an all-girls camp "helps you develop confidence in making decisions."

Still today, Waldenites (as Camp Walden alumnae are known) often recall the profound influence Miss Herz had on them. One former camper wrote, "I thank you for sharing your wonderful Walden with me--then and now--for it still remains the one place I want to be when summer comes." After receiving a touching gift from Miss Herz, another Waldenite wrote:

Miss Herz--we, your Waldenites, and all the girls from MAIN IDEA, going back to 1969 when you labored to give life and breath to your vision of a camping experience for inner city girls and girls from rural Maine ... could have been just like other girls, sent off to blend in with everyone else, instead of finding our voices and speaking up for fairness and what is right for ourselves and for others. But we had the fortune to be rescued by an artist in Maine, an artist who could look at us and see masterpieces ... I will remember so much of what you taught me, not the least of which is to dare to try. To go for it. And I will remember the lessons you taught me of believing in myself, of responsibility and honor and consideration for others and how we must give back, and, of the endless possibilities of creativity ... And these are all themes for me that have reached a critical juncture: I need to believe in myself. I need to write. I need to give back. And I need to cherish my friends and have fun.

== The Main Idea ==
Helen Herz Cohen founded The Main Idea at Camp Walden in 1968. The Main Idea is a nonprofit camp for economically disadvantaged girls. Camp Walden hosts the Main Idea on its property for ten days in August every year, at the close of the regular camping season. Every Main Idea camper attends for free. The Main Idea's budget is funded primarily through private donations from Camp Walden campers and alumnae.

Miss Herz's goal in establishing The Main Idea was "to try to give [the campers] a new window in life, see something different, inspire them to do something with their lives."

== World War II ==
We were always anxious to hear the news on the radio and were all affected by every battle. On Sunday evenings we sang around a campfire sitting on a piece of cleared ground near the bottom of a steep hill. I never liked the spot and hired a local forester to peel some pine logs and lay them in a semicircle around a secluded spot by the lake. On V-J evening, the news came over the radio that the war was over. I announced it to the camp in the dining room. There was a stunned silence. We were overcome with relief. I suggested that we walk quietly to the new campfire circle and sing together. We all walked silently down the path, sat down, and started to sing with our arms around each other -- many of us sobbing. Most of us sang all night and watched the sun rise. A quiet feeling of joy permeated the camp. The next day, we all had our own special way of expressing our happiness. Some ran and yelled, some went to church and prayed, and some just went about their daily routine. This was the first time we had been together at the new campfire. We called this beautiful spot The Peace Circle, and it's still at camp today.

— Helen Herz Cohen, "A Camp Director Remembers World War II"
