= Mrs. Palfrey at the Claremont =

2005 film by Dan Ireland

- Original US poster
- Directed by: Dan Ireland
- Screenplay by: Ruth Sacks Caplin
- Based on: Mrs. Palfrey at the Claremont by Elizabeth Taylor
- Produced by: Lee Caplin; Carl Colpaert; Matt Devlen; Zachary Matz
- Starring: Joan Plowright; Rupert Friend; Anna Massey; Robert Lang; Zoë Tapper
- Cinematography: Claudio Rocha
- Music by: Stephen Barton
- Production companies: Claremont Films; B7 Productions
- Distributed by: Cineville (US)
- Release date: 25 November 2005 (US)
- Running time: 108 minutes
- Country: United States
- Language: English
- Budget: $750,000
- Box office: $3,919,275

Mrs. Palfrey at the Claremont is a 2005 US-produced comedy-drama film based on the 1971 novel by Elizabeth Taylor. It was directed by Dan Ireland and produced by Lee Caplin, Carl Colpaert and Zachary Matz from a screenplay by Ruth Sacks Caplin.

The film stars Joan Plowright and Rupert Friend, with Zoë Tapper, Anna Massey, and Robert Lang. It is the final film role of Robert Lang, who died on 6 November 2004, a year before its release. The film is dedicated to his memory. The film was also dedicated to the memories of Sonia Mintz, Minnie Sacks, Lillian Espetein, Patricia Peckos, Thomas W. MacDonald and Clara Peralta Ramos de Varela, who also died before the film came out.

== Plot ==
All but abandoned by her family in a London retirement hotel, Mrs Palfrey (Joan Plowright) strikes up a curious friendship with a young writer, Ludovic Meyer (Rupert Friend). Fate brings them together after she has an accident outside his basement flat. The two newly found friends discover they have much more in common with each other than they do with people their own age. Ludovic inadvertently leads Mrs. Palfrey through her past; Mrs. Palfrey inadvertently leads Ludovic to his future.

== Cast ==
- Joan Plowright as Sarah Palfrey
- Rupert Friend as Ludovic Meyer
- Zoë Tapper as Gwendolyn
- Robert Lang as Mr Osborne
- Marcia Warren as Mrs Post
- Anna Massey as Mrs Arbuthnot
- Georgina Hale as Mrs Burton
- Millicent Martin as Mrs de Salis

== Television play ==
The novel was dramatised in 1973 as part of the BBC series Play for Today, with Celia Johnson playing Mrs Palfrey.
