= Blaming (novel) =

First edition (publ. Chatto & Windus)

Blaming is the last novel by Elizabeth Taylor. It was first published, posthumously, in 1976.

Amy's husband dies while she is on a cruise, and she is befriended by Martha, an awkward young American writer. According to The Guardian review, "The novel describes Amy's reluctant obligation to this fragile person and her internal narrative attempting to justify the distance she wants to keep."

== Criticism ==
The novel has been praised by the writer Jenny Diski : "Everyone in this book lacks a talent for friendship. People either avoid connection or impose themselves. Taylor's acerbic talent is in pitting the power of social cohesion against a nagging individualism. The style is economical and elegant as well as horridly funny."
