= Angel (2007 film) =

- Theatrical release poster
- Directed by: François Ozon
- Written by: François Ozon; Dialogue: Martin Crimp; François Ozon
- Based on: Angel by Elizabeth Taylor
- Produced by: Olivier Delbosc; Marc Missonnier
- Starring: Romola Garai; Sam Neill; Charlotte Rampling; Lucy Russell; Michael Fassbender; Jacqueline Tong; Janine Duvitski; Christopher Benjamin; Tom Georgeson; Simon Woods; Jemma Powell
- Cinematography: Denis Lenoir
- Edited by: Muriel Breton
- Music by: Philippe Rombi
- Production companies: Fidélité Films; Poisson Rouge Pictures; Scope Pictures
- Distributed by: Wild Bunch Distribution (France); Lionsgate (United Kingdom); ABC Distribution (Belgium)
- Release dates: 17 February 2007 (Berlinale); 14 March 2007
- Running time: 134 minutes
- Countries: Belgium; France; United Kingdom
- Language: English
- Box office: $2,822,161

Angel, also known as the Real Life of Angel Deverell, is a 2007 British romantic drama film directed by François Ozon. It is based on the 1957 novel of the same name by Elizabeth Taylor, about the short life of a passionate young woman in Edwardian England for whom the fake world of the pulpy novels she writes replaces reality. The protagonist was portrayed by Romola Garai; other characters were played by Sam Neill, Michael Fassbender and Charlotte Rampling.

== Plot ==
At age 17 the fatherless Angel Deverell is a misfit, living above her mother's grocery shop and writing overblown novels of impossible romance. A London publisher agrees to take one of her works, which proves a success, and others follow. The money allows her to buy "Paradise", a grand country house, and play at the life of an aristocrat.

At an event she meets Nora, who admires both her and her writing and offers to be her secretary. She also sees there Nora's handsome brother, a would-be painter called Esmé, whom she falls for. Though he is not interested, she pursues him and marries him. Her fantasy life at "Paradise" is not to his taste and release comes when the First World War breaks out and he enlists, leaving Nora to look after Angel. War horrifies her, removing the husband she loves, and her novels start advocating pacifism. Not being what the public wants, sales plummet and she runs out of money. She also suffers the loss of the baby she was carrying.

Esmé returns to "Paradise", broken in spirit after losing a leg, and hangs himself. In an interview, Angel continues to deny reality until a letter from a woman falls out of one of Esmé's books. Nora eventually admits that it was from Esmé's mistress Angelica, who lived at "Paradise" until her father had to sell it. Esmé was supporting her and their child in London and spending his leaves from the front with them rather than at "Paradise". Angel goes to Angelica's house to return the letter, seeing her and her little boy. Returning to "Paradise" and the faithful Nora, she catches cold and dies. Her publisher admits to Nora, who inherits the house, that nobody buys any of Angel's novels anymore.

== Cast ==
- Romola Garai as Angel Deverell
- Sam Neill as Theo Gilbright
- Lucy Russell as Nora Howe-Nevinson
- Michael Fassbender as Esmé Howe-Nevinson
- Charlotte Rampling as Hermione Gilbright
- Jacqueline Tong as Mother Deverell
- Janine Duvitski as Aunt Lottie
- Christopher Benjamin as Lord Norley
- Tom Georgeson as Marvell
- Simon Woods as Clive Fennelly
- Jemma Powell as Angelica
- Alison Pargeter as Edwina
- Seymour Matthews as Norley Doctor
- Una Stubbs as Miss Dawson
- Rosanna Lavelle as Lady Irania
- Ruth England as neighbour
- Geoffrey Streatfield as Sebastian
- Roger Morlidge as Journalist
- Cinsyla Key as Party guest
- Teresa Churcher as Governess
- Alexandre Garcia-Hidalgo as Party Guest
- Roland Javornik as Party Guest
- David Vanholsbeeck as Wounded Soldier in Cafe
- Animal handling by Gill Raddings Stunt Dogs
- Seamus as Sultan

== Production ==
The director gave an interview about the film, stating that "the character of Angel was inspired by Marie Corelli, Queen Victoria's favorite writer. Corelli was one of the first writers to become a star, writing bestsellers for an adoring public. Today she has been totally forgotten, even in England." He also mentioned that he considered Olivier Martinez for the role of Esmé, Angel's love interest, and when talking about Lucy Russell, who played Nora, he stated: "I saw a lot of actresses for the role of Nora. During the screen tests, I realized that many of them actually wanted to be Angel. As soon as they'd finish reading, they'd say to me "I could play Angel too, I am Angel!" They had no desire to play a supporting role, whereas Lucy Russell didn't mind. She showed up for her screen test dressed like an old maid, with thick glasses and her hair in a strict bun. She was actually there to play Nora! Of course the role is far less glamorous than that of Angel, but Lucy was smart enough to know that it is often the person in the shadows who gets noticed, even if she's not the one wearing the beautiful dresses. And like Charlotte, Lucy speaks fluent French, so she was my second crutch on the set!"

Reportedly, the outdoor scenes were shot in bitterly cold weather, and the camera would freeze after a few minutes of shooting, and had to be taken inside and warmed up with hot towels before taken outside again. The actors did not mind this as they too got the chance to warm up.

== Reception ==
The film holds a 50% approval rating on review aggregator Rotten Tomatoes, based on 22 critic reviews. The website's critics consensus reads, "An odd mix of period melo-drama and social satire, with lavish sets and costumes, but Angel never takes flight." Matthew Turner of View London called it an "Enjoyable, impressively directed melodrama that stays just the right side of kitsch and features a superb performance by Romola Garai." Whilst also stating that "The film's biggest problem is that Angel is such a thoroughly obnoxious character that it's impossible to engage with her on an emotional level", he ended saying that "Ozon's films are always worth watching and Angel is no exception, thanks to great direction and a committed performance from Garai."
