= At Mrs. Lippincote's =

1945 novel by Elizabeth Taylor

- First edition (UK)
- Author: Elizabeth Taylor
- Cover artist: Ray Russell
- Language: English
- Published: 1945
- Publisher: Peter Davies (UK); Alfred A. Knopf (US)
- Media type: Print
- ISBN: 0-86068-538-1

At Mrs. Lippincote's is a 1945 novel by Elizabeth Taylor, her first novel. It was published again in 1988 by Virago Press, containing an autobiographical sketch of the author.

== Plot synopsis ==
Julia and her husband, Roddy Davenant, along with their young son, Oliver, and Roddy's cousin, Eleanor, are temporarily living at Mrs. Lippincote's, a house filled with old mahogany furniture and other reminders of earlier wealth. Julia and the others have joined Roddy, who is an officer in the Royal Air Force.

She must be mother and, above all, an officer's wife. Roddy, a "leader of men," requires that she fulfil her role impeccably. Julia accepts the pompousness of Armed forces service life, but her honesty and sense of humour prevent her from taking her role too seriously.

== Reception ==
In a 1946 book review in Kirkus Reviews the review called the book "special social comedy" to be "subtle" and "stylised," but "lacking particular pattern or purpose." Kirkus also noted "we also expected it to interest only discriminating tastes." In a retrospective of Taylor, The Guardian wrote the book "was for many years well reviewed and commercially successful."

== See also ==
- 1945 in literature
