= Elizabeth Taylor (novelist) =

English novelist and short-story writer (1912–1975)

- Born: Betty Coles; 3 July 1912; Reading, England
- Died: 19 November 1975 (aged 63); Penn, Buckinghamshire
- Occupations: novelist, short story writer

Elizabeth Taylor (née Coles; 3 July 1912 – 19 November 1975) was an English novelist and short-story writer. Kingsley Amis described her as "one of the best English novelists born in this century". Antonia Fraser called her "one of the most underrated writers of the 20th century", while Hilary Mantel said she was "deft, accomplished and somewhat underrated". Her 1971 novel Mrs. Palfrey at the Claremont was shortlisted for The Booker Prize.

== Life and writings ==
Born in Reading, Berkshire, the daughter of Oliver Coles, an insurance inspector, and his wife Elsie May Fewtrell, Elizabeth was educated at The Abbey School, Reading, and then worked as a governess, tutor and librarian. In 1936 she married John Taylor, owner of a confectionery company. They lived in Penn, Buckinghamshire for almost all their married life. She was briefly a member of the British Communist Party, then a consistent Labour Party supporter.

Taylor's first novel, At Mrs. Lippincote's, was published in 1945. It was followed by eleven more. Her short stories were published in magazines and collected in four volumes. She also wrote a children's book.

She was a friend of the novelist Ivy Compton-Burnett and of the novelist and critic Robert Liddell. Her long correspondence with the latter forms the subject of one of her short stories, "The Letter Writers" (published in The Blush, 1951), but the letters were destroyed, in line with her general policy of keeping her private life private. A horror of publicity is the subject of another celebrated short story, "Sisters", written in 1969.

Taylor was also a close friend of Elizabeth Jane Howard, who was asked by Taylor's widower to write a biography following Elizabeth Taylor's death. Howard refused due to what she felt was a lack of incident in Taylor's life. Howard's memoir, Slipstream, includes more details on their friendship.

Taylor's editor at the UK publisher Chatto & Windus was the poet D. J. Enright.

Elizabeth Taylor died of cancer in Penn, Buckinghamshire, at the age of 63.

== Film adaptations ==
Perhaps the first film adaptation of one of her works was on the television series "Tales of the Unexpected", in August 1980, of the short story "The Flypaper." This broadcast became one of the infamously dark and sinister episodes in British TV history.

In the 21st century a new interest in her work was kindled by film-makers. Ruth Sacks Caplin had written a film screenplay based on Taylor's novel Mrs. Palfrey at the Claremont in the 1970s, but it languished for decades until her son, Lee Caplin, purchased the rights to the film in 1999. Ruth Sacks Caplin's film adaptation, Mrs. Palfrey at the Claremont, directed by Dan Ireland, was finally released in 2005 with British actress Joan Plowright in the title role.

French director François Ozon made a 2007 film of Angel with Romola Garai.

== Critical appraisal ==
Taylor's work is mainly concerned with the nuances of everyday life and situations. Anne Tyler once compared Taylor to Jane Austen, Barbara Pym and Elizabeth Bowen – "soul sisters all," in Tyler's words.

The critic Philip Hensher called The Soul of Kindness a novel "so expert that it seems effortless. As it progresses, it seems as if the cast are so fully rounded that all the novelist had to do was place them, successively, in one setting after another and observe how they reacted to each other.... The plot... never feels as if it were organised in advance; it feels as if it arises from her characters' mutual responses."

== Bibliography ==
=== Novels ===
- At Mrs. Lippincote's (1945)
- Palladian (1946) shows most clearly the influence of Jane Austen.
- A View of the Harbour (1947)
- A Wreath of Roses (1949)
- A Game of Hide and Seek (1951)
- The Sleeping Beauty (1953)
- Angel (1957)
- In a Summer Season (1961) is her most sex-infused work, telling the story of a rich woman who marries a man ten years her junior.
- The Soul of Kindness (1964)
- The Wedding Group (1968)
- Mrs. Palfrey at the Claremont (1971). The actress Elizabeth Taylor is probably implied in "the blousy Mrs Burton" coming to stay at the hotel. It was included in Robert McCrum's 100 Best Novels in English. Shortlisted for the Booker Prize.
- Blaming (1976), posthumous.

=== Short story collections ===
- Hester Lilly (1954)
- The Blush and Other Stories (1958)
- A Dedicated Man and Other Stories (1965)
- The Devastating Boys (1972). Includes "Sisters" and "Flesh"
- Dangerous Calm (1995). A selection of her stories and two previously unpublished short stories
- Complete Short Stories (2012). Collects all of the works in the first five short story collections
- Elizabeth Taylor: A Centenary Celebration (2012). Short stories uncollected in "Complete Short Stories" including unpublished and incomplete stories, and essays and letters
- You'll Enjoy It When You Get There: The Stories of Elizabeth Taylor (2014). A selection of her stories.

=== Short stories ===
- "For Thine is the Power", Tribune, 31 March 1944
- "A Nice Little Actress", Modern Short Stories, August 1944
- "Better Not", The Adelphi, October–December 1944
- "A Sad Garden", Modern Reading, March 1945
- "It Makes a Change", The Adelphi, October–December 1945
- "Mothers", Here Today, 1945
- "Husbands and Wives", New Short Stories 1945–1946, ed. John Singer, 1946
- "Ever So Banal", Kite, Spring 1946
- "Simone", Writing Today, Summer 1946
- "The Light of Day", The Harpers Monthly, December 1947
- "Red-letter Day", The New Yorker, 27 November 1948
- "First Death of Her Life", The New Yorker, 19 March 1949
- "After hours of suffering", Vogue, July 1949
- "The Beginning of a Story", The New Yorker, 29 October 1949
- "Nods & Becks & Wreathed Smiles", The New Yorker, 19 November 1949
- "Gravement Endommage", he New Yorker, 7 October 1950
- "Plenty Good Fiesta", The New Yorker, 14 July 1951
- "Oasis of Gaiety", The New Yorker, 18 August 1951
- "The Idea of Age", The New Yorker, 9 February 1952
- "Spry Old Character", The New Yorker, 7 March 1953
- "Swan-Moving", The New Yorker, 26 December 1953
- "Goodbye, Goodbye", The New Yorker, 14 August 1954
- "Poor Girl", The Third Ghost Book, ed. Cynthia Asquith, 1955
- "Hare Park", The New Yorker, 14 April 1956
- "The Ambush", The New Yorker, 2 June 1956
- "The True Primitive", The New Yorker, 11 May 1957
- "The Rose, the Mauve, the White", The New Yorker, 22 June 1957
- "The Blush", The New Yorker, 17 August 1957
- "You'll Enjoy It When You Get There", The New Yorker, 23 November 1957
- "A Troubled State of Mind, The Cornhill Magazine, Spring 1958
- "The Letter-Writers", The New Yorker, 31 May 1958
- "Perhaps a Family Failing", The New Yorker, 5 July 1958
- "Summer Schools", The New Yorker, 6 September 1958
- "The Benefactress", The New Yorker, 5 December 1959
- "The Thames Spread Out", The New Yorker, 19 December 1959
- "Thames-Side Venice", The Argosy (UK), May 1960
- "A Dedicated Man", The New Yorker, 4 June 1960
- "The Prerogative of Love", The New Yorker, 23 July 1960
- "Girl Reading", The New Yorker, 29 July 1961; republished in 2023 in Stories of Books and Libraries, edited by Jane Holloway (New York: Albert A. Knopf, 2023)
- "In a Different Light", The New Yorker, 29 July 1961
- "As If I Should Care", The New Yorker, 19 May 1962
- "Mice and Birds and Boy", The New Yorker, 9 February 1963
- "Mr Wharton", The New Yorker, 8 June 1963
- "The Voices", The New Yorker, 20 July 1963
- "In the Sun", The New Yorker, 18 April 1964
- "Vron and Willie", The New Yorker, 16 January 1965
- "Setting a Scene", The Cornhill Magazine, Autumn 1965
- "Hôtel du Commerce", The Cornhill Magazine, Winter 1965/66
- "The Devastating Boys", McCall's, May 1966
- "Tall Boy", The New Yorker, 31 December 1966
- "In and Out the Houses", The Saturday Evening Post, 14 December 1968
- "The Fly-Paper", The Cornhill Magazine, Spring 1969
- "Sisters", The New Yorker, 21 June 1969
- "Well, Here We Are", McCall's, December 1969
- "The Blossoming", Saturday Book Story, 1972
- "The Wrong Order", Winters Tale 19, 1972
- "Madame Olga", McCall's, August 1973

=== Children's book ===
- Mossy Trotter (1967)
