= A Game of Hide and Seek =

1951 novel by Elizabeth Taylor

- First US edition
- Author: Elizabeth Taylor
- Language: English
- Publisher: Peter Davies (UK); Alfred A. Knopf (US)
- Publication date: 1951
- Media type: Print (Hardcover)

A Game of Hide and Seek is a 1951 novel by Elizabeth Taylor.

A Game of Hide and Seek was published again in 1986 by Virago Press and Penguin Books, with an introduction by Elizabeth Jane Howard. In 2012 NYRB Classics issued a reprint of the novel with an introduction by Caleb Crain.

The novel is set in England, with a time-frame divided between the inter-war years and the peace after 1945, and is focused on the characters of Harriet Claridge and Vesey Macmillan, childhood acquaintances whose missed connection haunts them over decades. The novel explores their relationship, its effect on those around them, as they seek each other's love for more than 25 years.

== Plot ==
Harriet Claridge and Vesey Macmillan are loose acquaintances of the same age who meet as Harriet's mother, Lilian, and Vesey's aunt, Caroline, are close friends who met as young suffragettes. The summer they are 18 Vesey is sent to spend time in the countryside with his aunt before he is sent to Oxford. Harriet is frequently with Caroline as she tutors Vesey's young cousins. Harriet develops a crush on Vesey who only casually returns her feelings. Vesey assumes he will naturally become great and dreams of becoming a writer. Harriet, who is considered by her family to be unexceptional, has no dreams aside from being with Vesey. Sensing how deep the attachment is on Harriet's side, Vesey's aunt writes to her sister to request Vesey return home early.

With Vesey gone and the summer over, Harriet manages to get a job working as an assistant in a clothing shop and begins to date Charles Jephcott, her much older next door neighbour who had previously been jilted at the altar and is reluctant to recommit to another woman.

Over Christmas Vesey returns for a quick visit. Harriet's feelings for him are renewed enough that she rejects Charles when he proposes to her. Her mother dies shortly after, leaving her an orphan, and in the meantime Charles continues to care for her.

Nearly 20 years later Vesey and Harriet meet again when Vesey happens to be in town performing in Hamlet. Vesey is now a mediocre actor in an unremarkable theatre troupe while Harriet is a middle-class housewife, married to Charles, and mother to a teenage girl named Betsy. Harriet still has feelings for Vesey and he feels a renewed and stronger attraction to her. Vesey tries to persuade her that while he is in town they should have an affair. Charles, who is aware of Harriet's earlier attraction to Vesey and is a deeply jealous man, forces Harriet to invite Vesey over in order to reassure him that nothing is going on between them. Instead the meeting has the opposite effect and only furthers Charles' jealousy while continuing to stoke Harriet's feelings for Vesey.

Vesey returns to London but continues to have an emotional affair with Harriet who begins to visit him. The two are ultimately unable to consummate their affair due to Harriet's deep guilt over betraying Charles. In order to end their limbo, Vesey finally decides to tell Harriet he is moving to South Africa to take over his estranged father's business. Harriet returns to Charles and confesses that she has been seeing Vesey. Surprised by her confession he decides to forgive her and the two recommit to their marriage.

The South African trip is a lie as Vesey remains estranged from his father and is beginning to fall ill and plans to move back in with his mother. He and Harriet see each other a final time before he moves away.

== Reception ==
In a 1951 book review in Kirkus Reviews the review summarized; "A shaded, subtle recording of lonely lives which find no real contact—or comfort—with each other... the insights here are finedrawn, the conclusions inescapable. For her audience—which is established if selective." In reviewing the 2009 reissue, Elizabeth Day of The Guardian wrote "Taylor's forte as an author is acute observation and the devastating precision of her understated prose. Her brilliance is particularly evident in this, her fifth novel, set in her familiar milieu of middle-class married couples whose unfulfilled lives are crisscrossed with unspoken tension and stifled ardour." She further observed it "showcases much of what makes Taylor a great novelist: piercing insight, a keen wit and a genuine sense of feeling for her characters." Writing for The New Republic, Britt Peterson wrote "The ambiguous ending, Taylor’s best, like a perfect bubble that never bursts, is a moving refusal to render final judgment on any of the imperfect, well-meaning bumblers who make up the story."
