= Plowright Theatre =

Entertainment venue in North Lincolnshire, England

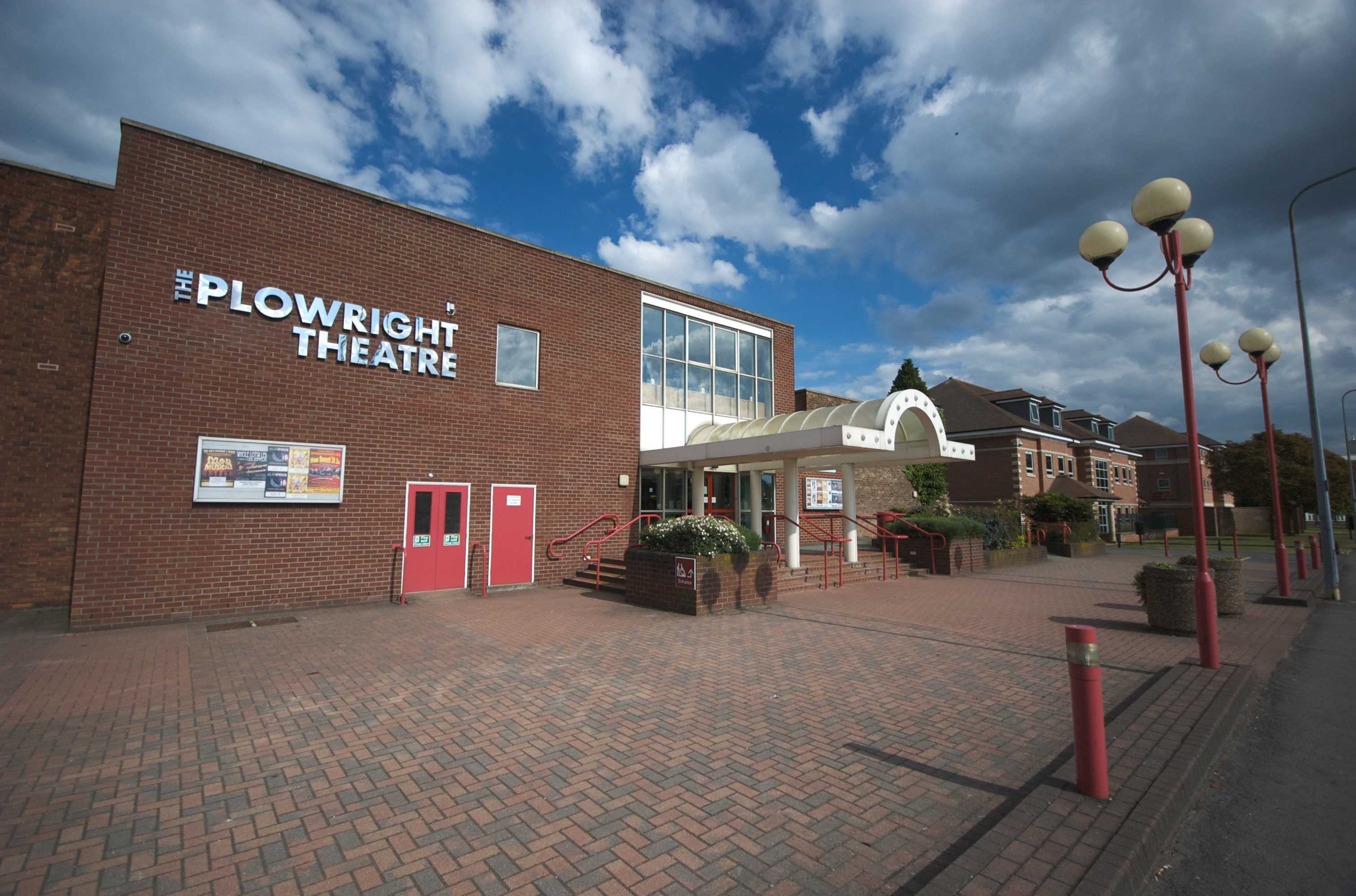
- The Plowright Theatre, Scunthorpe
- Interactive map of Plowright Theatre
- Location: Laneham Street, Scunthorpe, North Lincolnshire, England
- Coordinates: 53.5883°N 0.6505°W
- Owner: North Lincolnshire Council
- Capacity: 354 All Seated
- Type: Theatre, Live Entertainment
- Events: Music, pantomime, comedy, dance

Construction
- Opened: 1958

Website
- Plowright Theatre Website

The Plowright Theatre is a live entertainment venue on Laneham Street in Scunthorpe, North Lincolnshire. It is owned and run by North Lincolnshire Council. It is the Sister Venue to the Baths Hall located on Doncaster Road in Scunthorpe.

The Plowright Theatre was commissioned by the former Scunthorpe Borough Council and built by J. W. Taylor in 1958. It is a traditional proscenium style theatre with a 354 seat auditorium. Originally known as Scunthorpe Civic Theatre it was renamed in the 1990s in recognition of the achievements of local actress Joan Plowright. Plowright was born in Brigg, educated in Scunthorpe, and served as the president of the Scunthorpe Little Theatre Club. The club was founded by her father, Bill Plowright, and staged the theatre's first performance, Peer Gynt, in 1958.

== Performances ==
The Scunthorpe Musical Theatre Society performs a musical every year at the theatre, as does the Scunthorpe Gilbert and Sullivan Amateur Operatic Society.

In March 2008, previous box office records at the theatre were broken, after tickets for comedian Lee Evans became the fastest sell-out in the theatre's history. The local newspaper reported that a queue had formed at the box office at 6am, and that all tickets were sold within 65 minutes after the box office opened at 10:30am.
