= Ruth Sacks Caplin =

American screenwriter and fashion designer (1920–2014)

Ruth Sacks Caplin (September 5, 1920 – August 5, 2014) was an American screenwriter, arts advocate, therapist and philanthropist known for her adapted screenplay for the film Mrs. Palfrey at the Claremont, starring Joan Plowright and Rupert Friend.

== Early life and education ==
Ruth Sacks was born in New York City on September 5, 1920. Her parents, who were Jewish immigrants originally from Eastern Europe, were both lawyers. Sacks received her bachelor's degree in art education in 1941 from Skidmore College. In 1977, she completed her master's degree in counseling and therapy from American University.

== Marriage and family ==
In 1942, she married Mortimer Caplin, an attorney, whom she had met when both were teenagers. The couple had five children, Lee, Michael, Jeremy, Cate and Mary Ellen Caplin. She now has nine grandchildren; Ella, Bennett, Sophie, Phoebe, Aubrey, Harriet, Daniel, Victoria ad Carter Caplin. Mortimer Caplin served as the Commissioner of Internal Revenue from 1961 to 1963. Ruth worked as a fashion designer in New York City early in the marriage.

== Early career-Virginia ==
The family moved to Charlottesville, Virginia, in 1951, when Mortimer Caplin became a law professor at the University of Virginia School of Law. She began working on children's plays in local schools as a costume designer and director. However, many local public schools temporarily closed in the late 1950s as part of Virginia's resistance to desegregation at the beginning of the Civil Rights Movement. Caplin and other parents organized makeshift home schools for students in defiance of the closures. She taught her children dance, music and studio arts in the family basement. She also co-designed her husband's law firm office.

== Children's theater/counseling-Washington, DC ==
The Caplins again relocated in 1961, this time to Washington D.C. when Mortimer Caplin was appointed Commissioner of Internal Revenue by the Kennedy administration. Ruth Sacks Caplin continued her work with children's theater in the Washington area. She offered therapy and counseling services from her home in Chevy Chase, Maryland. Caplin did not retire from counseling until she was in her late 80s.

== Screenwriter ==
Ruth Caplin Sacks chanced upon a novel called "Mrs. Palfrey at the Claremont" by Elizabeth Taylor while traveling with her husband in London during the late 1970s. The Caplins had recently lost their daughter, 29-year-old Mary Ellen, to cancer. Ruth Caplin found the plot of the novel, which centers on Laura Palfrey, an older woman who moves to a residential hotel for the elderly, comforting. Palfrey, who is working through her own period of grief, befriends an aspiring young writer, Ludo. During the course of the book, Ludo helps Laura to overcome her loneliness and becomes as close as a grandson to her.

Caplin, who identified closely with the story, soon set out to write a screenplay based on the novel. While she had been a writer throughout her life, she had never been published, nor had she previously attempted to pen a screenplay. Caplin purchased a how-to guide on screenwriting and began her work. Her writing for the film allowed her to retreat into an "imaginary, quiet" and move forward through her grief, according to the Washington Post. Caplin, who disliked unhappy endings, lightened the mood of some of the book's sadder scenes.

Despite her efforts, Ruth Sacks Caplin's screenplay was ignored for decades until her son, film producer Lee Caplin, purchased the film rights for her screenplay and the movie in 1999. In the early 2000s, Lee and Mortimer Caplin flew Ruth to London, where she was surprised to find Mrs. Palfrey at the Claremont in production. Directed by Dan Ireland, Academy Award-nominated actress Joan Plowright was cast as Laura Palfrey, opposite actor Rupert Friend as Ludo, in the title roles.

Mrs. Palfrey at the Claremont was released in 2005 when Ruth Sacks Caplin, making her screenwriting debut, was 85 years old. She acknowledged at the time that seeing her work in theaters was "...a nice surprise, in the senior quarter of my life to have this bloom." Film critics gave the movie positive reviews. Stephen Hunter of the Washington Post praised Joan Plowright's performance, saying it was "possibly her best role in the flickers," while Roger Ebert called the film "a delight ... in ways both expected and rare."

== Philanthropy ==
Ruth and Mortimer Caplin donated four million dollars for the construction of a new theater at the University of Virginia. The Ruth Caplin Theatre, a 300-seat theater located in the Department of Drama, was named in her honor and her advocacy for the arts. The theater was opened and dedicated in 2013. Additionally, Ruth Sacks Kaplan helped to establish the university's President's Council for the Arts.

== Death ==
A resident of Chevy Chase, Maryland, Ruth Sacks Caplin, who suffered from a heart condition, died at a hospital in Bethesda, Maryland, on August 5, 2014, one month short of 94. She was survived by her husband of 71 years and their four surviving children.
