= Lee Caplin =

American entertainment executive (b. 1946)

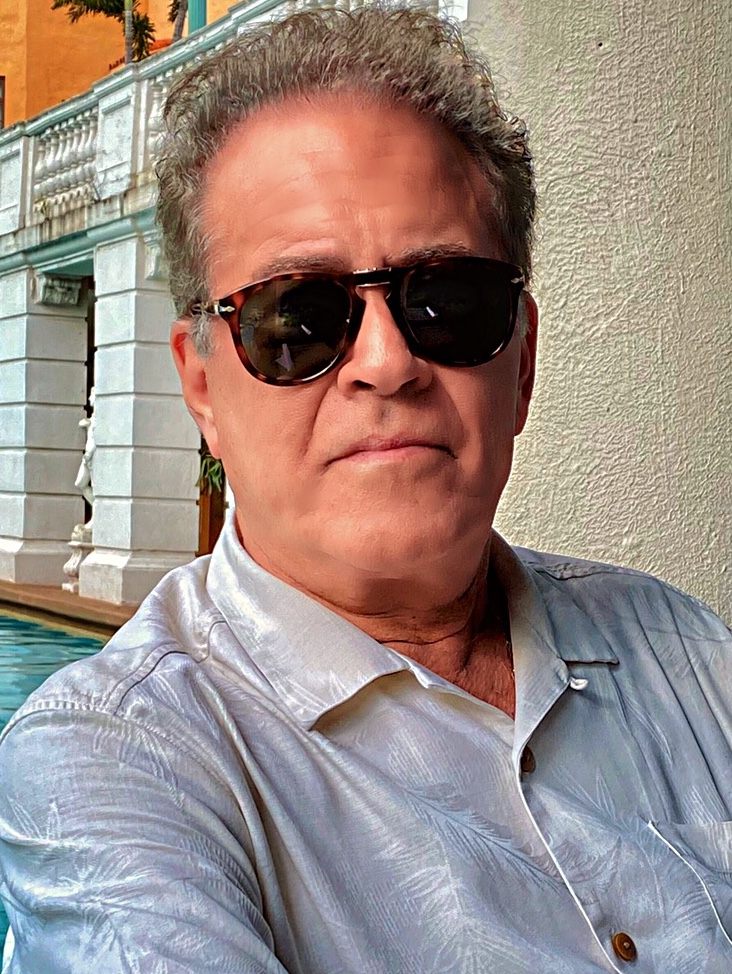
Lee Caplin

Lee Evan Caplin (born September 8, 1946) is an American entertainment and communications industry executive. He is the founder of Picture Entertainment Corporation, and is its chairman and CEO. Caplin also founded iSTAR (Immersive Studio for Altered Reality) at FIU (Florida International University) within CARTA (Communication, Architecture + The Arts) in Miami. He previously co-founded and was a director with Jay Penske of Velocity Services Inc., which was later renamed Mail.com Media Company and eventually renamed Penske Media Corporation, which owns Variety and Rolling Stone magazines.

== Early years and education ==
Caplin was born in New York City to Mortimer Caplin, a prominent tax attorney and founder of Caplin & Drysdale, and screenwriter, Ruth Sacks Caplin. He is the grandson of Daniel Caplin, New York City teacher and fight manager, and the great-nephew of Jewish gangster Nathan Kaplan.

Caplin moved with his family to Charlottesville, VA in 1951 when his father accepted a professorship at the University of Virginia School of Law. In 1961, his father was appointed Commissioner of Internal Revenue under the Kennedy Administration, and the family again relocated to Washington, DC. Caplin graduated from St. Albans School in 1965. He went on to earn his Bachelor of Arts in Political Science from Duke University in 1969, and his Juris Doctor from the University of Virginia School of Law in 1972, where he was an editor of the Law Review.

== Career ==
=== Law ===
Upon earning his Juris Doctor, Caplin was special counsel to Common Cause and oversaw Appellate litigation enforcing the Clean Water Act with the Environmental Protection Agency.

=== The Business of Art ===
Caplin worked as a Special Assistant Chairman with the National Endowment for the Arts. In conjunction with the U.S. Small Business Administration, in developing The Business of Art and the Artist, a national program designed to teach business skills to America's artists. This effort culminated in Prentice Hall Trade publishing Caplin's textbook, The Business of Art, a 3-time bestseller. Caplin's publishing companies have produced over 200 titles of illustrated educational and children's books.

=== Picture Entertainment ===
Caplin founded Picture Entertainment Corporation (PEC) in 1984. Beginning with projects like The Great American Art Game and Andy Warhol: Made in China, Caplin went on to executive produce Ali, starring Will Smith, with Sony Pictures Entertainment and Columbia Pictures in 2001. Will Smith and Jon Voight both received Academy Award nominations for their performances.

In 2005, Caplin's mother, Ruth Sacks Caplin, wrote an adaptation of a 1971 Elizabeth Taylor novel. Caplin purchased the film rights and produced Mrs. Palfrey at the Claremont, directed by Dan Ireland, starring Academy Award-nominated Joan Plowright opposite Rupert Friend in the title roles. Stephen Hunter of The Washington Post described Plowright's performance as "possibly her best role in the flickers," and Roger Ebert called the film "a delight…in ways both expected and rare."

PEC has evolved into a multifaceted operation spanning the entertainment, literary, and sports industries. PEC's subsidiary, Picture Entertainment Sports, focuses on Pay Per View boxing, mixed martial arts, and soccer.

=== William Faulkner ===
Caplin is the Executor of the Literary Estate of Nobel Prize, author William Faulkner. In this role, he produces motion picture, television, and theatrical productions based on Faulkner's works, and oversees the development of the William Faulkner brand.

In 2003, Caplin granted the rights to Aaron Schneider to bring Faulkner's 1942 short story, Two Soldiers, to the screen. Schneider's adaptation went on to win the Academy Award for Best Live Action Short Film at the 76th Academy Awards.

In 2013, Caplin produced James Franco's directorial debut, As I Lay Dying, adapted from Faulkner's 1930 novel of the same name The film premiered at the 66th Annual Cannes Film Festival. In 2014, Caplin partnered with James Franco once more to produce The Sound and the Fury (2014 film), the second film adaptation of Faulkner's 1929 novel of the same name. The film was selected to screen out of competition at the 71st Annual Venice International Film Festival.

=== Producing ===
Caplin co-produces HBO's True Detective. The critically acclaimed series has been nominated for numerous awards, and has won the Primetime Emmy Awardfor Outstanding Main Title Design, Outstanding Cinematography, Outstanding Makeup, Outstanding Casting, and Outstanding Directing. True Detective received a Golden Globe Award nomination for Best Mini-Series or Motion Picture Made for Television, and Woody Harrelson, Matthew McConaughey, and Michelle Monaghan received nominations for their Season 1 performances.

=== Other work ===
Caplin was a Founding Faculty member of the California State University at Monterey Bay (CSUMB). He, with Luis Valdez, established CSUMB's Cinematic Arts & Technology department. He continues to lecture and offer courses in film and television, communications, art, business, and law. Caplin is co-owner of Keystone Studios, the successor to America's first motion picture studio, founded by Mack Sennett in 1912.

== Personal life ==
Caplin currently resides in Los Angeles with his wife, concert pianist Gita Karasik, whom he married in 1975. Together, they have one son, Daniel Alexander (born 1988).
