= Angel (novel) =

1957 novel by Elizabeth Taylor

- First edition cover
- Author: Elizabeth Taylor
- Published: 1957 (Peter Davies); 1984 (Virago Press)
- Publication place: England
- Media type: Print
- Pages: 215 (first edition)
- ISBN: 1844083071 Virago Press edition
- OCLC: 154702351 (first edition)

Angel is a novel by the English novelist Elizabeth Taylor first published in 1957.

It tells the life story of Angelica ("Angel") Deverell from her adolescence and first attempts at writing, through the course of her career as a successful writer of sensational romances, into her decline, old age and death. Although she finds fame and wealth and marries the love of her life, Angel is condemned to a life of isolation and disappointment: critics regard her work as absurd and her closest relationships—with her publisher, her husband, and her sister-in-law—are doomed by the inability of others to conform to her unrealistic view of life. Although Angel is in the main portrayed as a grotesque eccentric, she is frequently made to seem pathetic, if not tragic.

Angel is a fictional representation of the temporarily popular writer of romances such as Marie Corelli, Ouida, or Ethel M. Dell. Matthew Walther argues that "the book is not really a roman à clef so much as it is a kind of horrifying anti-memoir, Taylor’s sounding of her own experience and dredging up her worst fears as a young female writer: mawkishness, philistinism, naïveté, stupidity, solipsism."

Angel was reprinted by Virago Press in 1984 with a new introduction by Paul Bailey.

Angel was the February 2012 Classics Book Club Selection at The New York Review of Books. It was published in the NYRB Classics series on February 14, 2012, with an introduction by Hilary Mantel.

== Plot ==
Angel Deverell is an imaginative 15 year old girl who longs for a luxurious life despite being born to a simple mother who runs a shop and having an aunt who works in service. After her mother discovers Angel has been telling stories about secretly being an heiress, Angel decides to weave her fantasies into novel form. Much to her mother's distress she abandons school and devotes herself to writing. After finishing her first novel, Lady Irania, Angel sends it haphazardly to publishers. She is at last given an offer to publish it by Gilbright & Brace though the two publishers are divided. Brace believes the novel is overwritten dreck while Gilbert agrees but believes they can make money off of it. They are surprised when they finally meet the teenage Angel, but Theo Gilbright finds himself charmed by Angel and her total lack of irony about her work.

Angel's novel is published and becomes a sensation and best seller though she is shocked to find herself viciously savaged by reviewers. Determined to prove them wrong she immediately starts writing a new novel.

By the time Angel is in her early 20s she has achieved massive financial success through critical praise eludes her. She has her mother retire and moves them to the genteel countryside, a move which causes their parent-child relationship to be inverted as Mrs. Deverell becomes afraid of incurring her daughter's wrath. Angel begins to feel something is missing in her life and longs to fall in love. Shortly after she invites Lord Norley, a local patron, to tea and meets his niece and nephew, Nora Howe-Nevinson, a poet and fan who worships Angel, and Esmé Howe-Nevinson, an amateur painter. Despite their brief meeting Angel decides she is in love with Esmé and is disappointed when he fails to contact her again. In order to entrap Esmé, Angel mentions Nora in an interview as an inspiration to her work. Some months later, after her mother has died, Nora comes to pay her respects to Angel. She moves in as a companion for Angel, but nevertheless fails to materialize her brother.

When Angel is 30 she at last learns that Esmé, after years spent abroad in disgrace, has moved to London. She moves there temporarily and commissions him to paint a portrait of her. Despite Angel's wilfulness and vanity, Esmé correctly guesses that she is quite lonely. In contrast to her tendency towards opulence he paints Angel realistically. At the end of the summer he visits Angel at her country home. Together they visit Paradise House, the old mansion where Angel's aunt Lottie used to work and which spurred Angel's fantasies. Angel decides to buy the house and Esmé confesses his love for her. The two marry.

Though Angel fails to realize it, their marriage does not have an auspicious start. Near the beginning of World War I Esmé decides to enlist, much to Angel's disapproval. She begins writing anti-war screeds and for the first time her books begin to fail, landing her in financial difficulties. On a trip to London, Nora discovers that Esmé is back on leave but is having an affair which she keeps a secret from Angel. By 1918 Esmé, wounded in the war, returns to Angel and Paradise House, now deeply dispirited and unable to paint. He begins to gamble and falls deeply into debt. In order to save him Angel writes another fantasy novel which is successful. His marriage to Angel is cut short when he accidentally drowns.

Angel and Nora continue to live together in Paradise House, though Angel is unable to write and her books fall out of print. Angel and Nora fall into poverty and obscurity. Shortly after Nora's uncle, Lord Norley dies leaving her an heiress, Angel dies as well. Nora discovers a will written by Angel in which Nora receives her entire fortune. However, nothing is left and Nora resolves to leave Paradise House and let it fall into disuse.

== Adaptation ==
In 2007, Angel was turned into a movie by French director François Ozon.

== External links and further reading ==
- New York Times book review
