= A View of the Harbour =

Fictional novel

- First English edition cover
- Author: Elizabeth Taylor
- Published: 1947 ( Peter Davies Ltd., England); 1947 (Alfred A. Knopf, USA)
- Media type: Print
- Pages: 289
- OCLC: 12890670

A View of the Harbour is a novel by Elizabeth Taylor. First published in 1947 in England and the United States, it was her third novel. It is the first of her novels in which one of the main characters is a creative artist. The relationship of the artist to society and other people was to be an important theme in Taylor's subsequent work.

The narrative, which is set in a postwar English seaside town, is told from the points of view of several characters. The story involves an abortive love affair between the husband of Beth, a novelist, and her best friend and next door neighbour, as well as the comings and goings of Bertram, a retired naval officer who has come to town intending to take up painting.

The novel was favourably reviewed when first published, and has been reissued in the 2010s in the Virago Modern Classics and NYRB Classics series.

== Plot ==
The novel is set in a fictional English seaside town soon after the end of World War II. Several characters' points of view alternate in the narration. The story begins with the arrival of Bertram Hemingway, a retired naval officer and amateur painter who soon becomes acquainted with most of the other protagonists. These include Beth Cazabon, a novelist, her husband Robert, the town doctor, and Beth's best friend and next door neighbour Tory Foyle. Robert and Tory, a divorcée, are secretly in love with each other. The Cazabons have two daughters: a little girl named Stevie, and Prudence, who has finished school and is living at home. Prudence eventually learns of the relationship between her father and her mother's friend, but does not tell anyone. However, Tory and Robert know they have been discovered.

Other characters include Mrs. Bracey, a widowed invalid, and her two adult daughters. Mrs. Bracey spends her time watching the view from her window and speculating on the behaviour of the townspeople. She is a patient of Robert Cazabon and is visited by Bertram Hemingway, who enjoys listening to her gossip. When she develops pneumonia Bertram takes turns with her daughters sitting with her, and is present when she dies.

Bertram also briefly befriends Lily Wilson, a young war widow who owns a waxworks exhibition. He meets her at the pub where he is lodging and gets into the habit of walking her home in the evenings. Lonely and depressed, Lily is disappointed when his attention shifts to Tory Foyle, to whom he eventually proposes marriage. In order to end her affair with Robert, Tory decides to move to London and unexpectedly agrees to marry Bertram. Before leaving the town Bertram presents the pub owner with a painting depicting a view of the harbour. Tory's departure for London takes place on the same day as Mrs. Bracey's funeral.

== Major themes ==
The relationship of the creative artist to other people and to society is a major theme in Taylor's work, and more than half of her novels have a writer or visual artist as a main character. A related theme is the relationship between creative imagination and self-deception.

A View of the Harbour is the first of Taylor's books to centre on a creative artist. Beth, a novelist, is portrayed as "blind to external reality", not noticing that her husband is having an affair with her best friend and next-door neighbour. Taylor describes Beth writing a detailed description of a fictional funeral, when she has never attended a real funeral and refuses to attend Mrs. Bracey's, protesting "I shouldn't know what to do. I should hate it." On the other hand, she realises that her talent is limited and that the real value of her work is the pleasure and fulfilment it gives her. Bertram, the other artist character, has a vision of himself as a successful painter, but does not paint very much or with much success, instead spending much of his time visiting.

A View of the Harbour also deals with the details of domestic life and the traditional activities of women's work, including cooking, cleaning and child care. Beth's novel writing takes place in the context of her family responsibilities as the doctor's wife and the mother of two daughters. Among the characters whose inner lives are described are the Cazabons' "daily woman" and Mrs. Bracey's daughter, who serves drinks at the pub.

== Publication history ==
A View of the Harbour was first published in 1947 by Peter Davies Ltd. in England and by Alfred A. Knopf in the United States. Virago Press published it in the Virago Modern Classics series in 1987. In 2018 it was one of 12 novels included in a new Virago series published in celebration of Virago's fortieth anniversary. NYRB Classics republished A View of the Harbour in the United States in 2015.

== Reception ==
A View of the Harbour was favourably reviewed on its publication in 1947. In The New York Times Orville Prescott described the novel as characteristically English in being "all wit and charm on the surface and unexpectedly penetrating underneath". Also in the New York Times, Donald Barr placed Taylor in the tradition of Jane Austen for her humour, and praised her talent for characterisation while finding "flaws of technique" including "laconic settings of scene". Nelson Algren also commented on her gift for characterisation, describing the novel as "deft and witty" while "almost plotless", and compared Taylor's technique to Henry James's.
