= Virginia Tax Review =

- Discipline: Tax Law
- Language: English

Publication details
- History: 1980–present
- Publisher: University of Virginia School of Law
- Frequency: Triannually

Standard abbreviations
- Bluebook: Va. Tax Rev.
- ISO 4: Va. Tax Rev.

Indexing
- ISSN: 0735-9004

Links
- Journal homepage

The Virginia Tax Review (VTR) is one of the oldest student-run law journals at the University of Virginia School of Law, and is the only journal at the Law School to deal exclusively with tax and corporate topics. It is consistently one of the most influential tax law journals, alongside the Tax Law Review and the Florida Tax Review. VTR publishes three times annually. The journal is devoted to matters related to federal taxation. The current editor-in-chief is Ronald Petersen.

== History and profile ==
The Virginia Tax Review was founded in the Spring of 1980 by George Howell and Donald Delson, and the first issue was published in the Spring of 1981. VTR received its initial funding from Mortimer Caplin, an alumnus of the University of Virginia, who was Commissioner of Internal Revenue during the Kennedy administration and founder of the firm of Caplin and Drysdale.

As of 2022, the Virginia Tax Review ranked among the top specialty journals, and routinely published authors from top-fourteen law schools. At that time, it was among the top-ranked tax law journals based on a combined score of impact, case cites, journal cites, cites/cost and currency factors. It complements the University of Virginia's highly ranked curriculum in tax law.
