= Celia Johnson =

English actress (1908–1982)

Dame Celia Johnson DBE
- Born: Celia Elizabeth Johnson; 18 December 1908; Richmond, Surrey, England
- Died: 26 April 1982 (aged 73); Nettlebed, Oxfordshire, England
- Education: St Paul's Girls' School
- Years active: 1928–1982
- Known for: The Prime of Miss Jean Brodie
- Spouse: Peter Fleming (m. 1935; died 1971)
- Children: 3, including Lucy
- Awards: BAFTA Award for Best Actress in a Supporting Role

Dame Celia Elizabeth Johnson (18 December 1908 – 26 April 1982) was an English actress, whose career included stage, television and film. She is especially known for her roles in the films In Which We Serve (1942), This Happy Breed (1944), Brief Encounter (1945) and The Captain's Paradise (1953). For Brief Encounter, she was nominated for the Academy Award for Best Actress. A six-time BAFTA Award nominee, she won the BAFTA Award for Best Actress in a Supporting Role for The Prime of Miss Jean Brodie (1969).

Johnson began her stage acting career in 1928, and subsequently achieved success in West End and Broadway productions. Popular with British audiences as an "ordinary woman," she continued performing in theatre for the rest of her life. Much of her later work was in television, including winning the BAFTA TV Award for Best Actress for the BBC Play for Today, Mrs Palfrey at the Claremont (1973). She suffered a stroke in 1982 and died later the same day, aged 73.

== Early life and education ==
Born in Richmond, Surrey, and nicknamed "Betty", Johnson was the second daughter of John Robert Johnson and Ethel (née Griffiths) Johnson. Her first public performance was in 1916, when she played a role in a charity performance of King Cophetua and the Beggar Maid to raise funds for returned First World War soldiers.

She attended St Paul's Girls' School in London from 1919 until 1926, and played the oboe in the school's orchestra under Gustav Holst. She acted in school productions, but had no other acting experience, when she was accepted to study at Royal Academy of Dramatic Art in 1926, where she was in the same class as Margaretta Scott. She later spent a term in Paris, studying under Pierre Fresnay at the Comédie Française. She later recalled her choice of an acting career with the comment, "I thought I'd rather like it. It was the only thing I was good at. And I thought it might be rather wicked."

== Career ==
Her stage début, and first professional role, was as Sarah in George Bernard Shaw's Major Barbara at the Theatre Royal, Huddersfield in 1928. She went to London the following year to take the place of Angela Baddeley in the part of Currita in A Hundred Years Old, which was performed at the Lyric Theatre in Hammersmith. In 1930 Johnson played in Cynara with Sir Gerald Du Maurier and Dame Gladys Cooper. She made her first trip to the United States the following year to star as Ophelia in a New York City production of Hamlet.

She returned to London, where she appeared in a number of minor productions, before establishing herself with a two-year run in The Wind and the Rain (1933–35). She married the journalist Peter Fleming in 1935, and in 1939 gave birth to their first child, a son. Her theatre career flourished with her portrayals of Elizabeth Bennet in Pride and Prejudice (1940) and the second Mrs. de Winter in Rebecca (1940); the production of the latter was halted when the theatre was destroyed by a Luftwaffe bomb in September 1940.

During the Second World War Johnson lived with her widowed sister and sister-in-law, and helped care for their combined seven children. Unable to commit her time to the often lengthy run of a play, Johnson preferred the less time-consuming schedules of film and radio, which allowed her to devote time to her family and her work for the Women's Auxiliary Police Corps. She appeared in In Which We Serve (1942) and This Happy Breed (1944), both directed by David Lean and written by Noël Coward.

Lean and Coward sought Johnson for the next production, Brief Encounter (1945). She accepted the role with misgivings because of her family responsibilities, but was interested in the part, writing to her husband, "There is no getting away from the fact that it is a very good part and one which I should love to play. I have found myself already planning how I should play bits and how I should say lines..." A romantic drama about a conventional middle-class housewife who falls in love with a married doctor she meets in the refreshment room at a railway station, the film was well-received, and is now regarded as a classic. Johnson was awarded the New York Film Critics Circle Award for Best Actress and was nominated for the Academy Award for Best Actress.

After the war, Johnson concentrated on her family life, which included two daughters born in 1946 and 1947 and her occasional acting work was secondary for the following decade.

In 1958 she acted with Ralph Richardson in The Flowering Cherry. In 1958, she opened The Grass is Greener. As a member of Laurence Olivier's National Theatre Company, Johnson appeared in the plays The Master Builder (1964) (with Olivier) and Hay Fever (1965), and later reprised her roles in the television productions.

== Awards ==
For her role in The Prime of Miss Jean Brodie (1969), she received the BAFTA Award for Best Actress in a Supporting Role. She was created a Commander of the Order of the British Empire (CBE) in 1958, "for services to the theatre", and was raised to Dame Commander (DBE) in the 1981 Birthday Honours.

== Personal life and death ==
Johnson was married to Peter Fleming (who during the Second World War became a Lieutenant Colonel in the Special Operations Executive, and who was known as the author of travel literature such as Brazilian Adventure and non-fiction works including The Siege at Peking) from 1935 until Fleming's death from a heart attack in 1971, while on a shooting expedition near Glencoe in Argyll, Scotland. He was the brother of the James Bond creator, Royal Naval Volunteer Reserve Commander, and MI6-SIS Information Research Division (IRD) spy Ian Fleming.

They had three children:

- Nicholas Peter Val Fleming (3 January 1939 – 9 May 1995), spent most of his life at the Fleming family home in Nettlebed, Oxfordshire, as a farmer. He was also a journalist, and the author of thriller novels published in the late 1960s and early 1970s, and a non-fiction historical work, August 1939. From his early twenties he lived with his partner Christopher Balfour, a merchant banker.
- Kate Fleming (born 1946), now Kate Grimond, is married to John Grimond (son of politician Jo Grimond), former foreign editor of the news magazine The Economist, now writer-at-large for the publication; the couple have three children. She is the author of Celia Johnson: A Biography (1991).
- Lucy Fleming (born Eve Lucinda Fleming, 15 May 1947), is an actress. In the 1970s she starred as Jenny in the BBC's apocalyptic fiction series Survivors. She is married to the actor and writer Simon Williams.

Since the late 1990s, the two sisters, Kate Grimond and Lucy Fleming, have co-owned the Ian Fleming estate.

Johnson distanced herself from her acting career while her children were young, preferring to devote her attention to her family. She was described as a woman "always ready to laugh" and "maternal in a light-hearted way" and her daughter recalled that she was often torn between her desire to care for her family and her need to be involved in the "mechanics" of acting.

In 1982, she was touring with Sir Ralph Richardson in Angela Huth's The Understanding and the play's West End run had been announced. On one of her days off, she was at her home in Nettlebed, Oxfordshire, playing bridge with friends, when she collapsed from a stroke. She died a few hours later in her home. She left an estate worth £150,557.

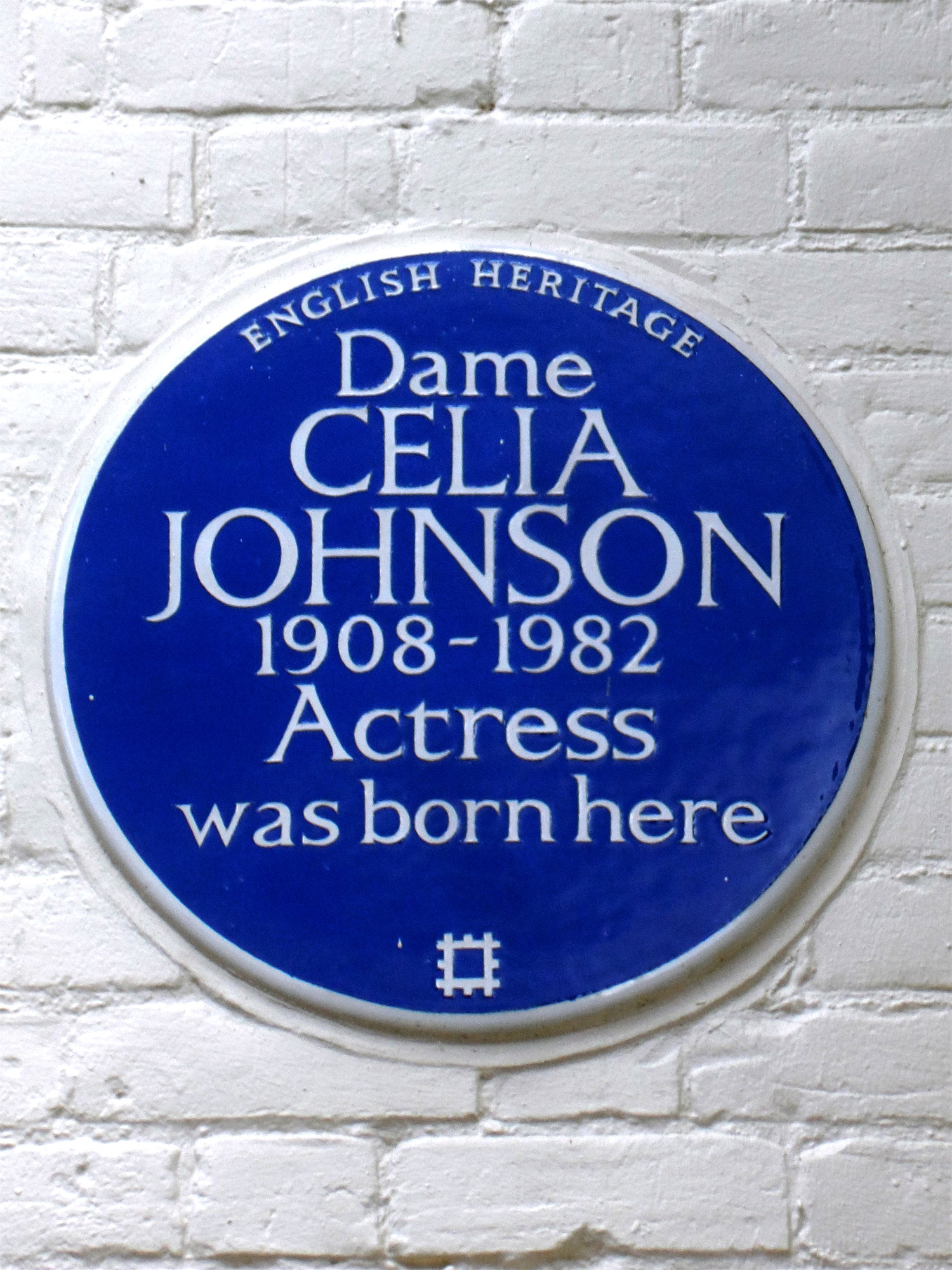
Blue plaque for Dame Celia Johnson

== Legacy ==
On 18 December 2008, to mark the centenary of her birth, a blue plaque was unveiled at her childhood home in Richmond. Among the guests at the ceremony were her daughters, Lucy Fleming and Kate Grimond. In The Times, Grimond noted that the "tragedy of theatre" is that even the best performances fade from memory, and that her mother's current reputation rests almost entirely on her performance in Brief Encounter. Grimond noted that the advent of video allowed the film to be seen by a new audience, and that modern appraisals of the film had led to its being regarded as a classic.

== Filmography ==
Year	Title	Role	Notes
1941	A Letter from Home	English Mother	Short documentary
1942	In Which We Serve	Mrs. Alix Kinross	
1943	Dear Octopus	Cynthia	aka The Randolph Family
1944	This Happy Breed	Ethel Gibbons	National Board of Review Award for Best Actress
1945	Brief Encounter	Laura Jesson	New York Film Critics Circle Award for Best Actress; Nominated – Academy Award for Best Actress
1950	The Astonished Heart	Barbara Faber	
1951	I Believe in You	Matty Matheson	Nominated – BAFTA Award for Best Actress in a Leading Role
1952	The Holly and the Ivy	Jenny Gregory	
1953	The Captain's Paradise	Maud St. James	Nominated – BAFTA Award for Best Actress in a Leading Role
1955	A Kid for Two Farthings	Joanna	
1957	The Good Companions	Miss Trant	
1969	The Prime of Miss Jean Brodie	Miss Mackay	BAFTA Award for Best Actress in a Supporting Role
1973	Play for Today	Mrs. Palfrey	Episode: "Mrs. Palfrey at the Claremont"; British Academy Television Award for Best Actress
1976	Dame of Sark	Dame Sibyl Hathaway	TV movie
1978	Les Misérables	Sister Simplice	TV movie
1980	The Hostage Tower	Mrs. Wheeler	TV movie
1980	Staying On	Lucy Smalley	TV movie Granada; Nominated – British Academy Television Award for Best Actress
1980	All's Well That Ends Well	Countess of Rousillion	TV movie
1981	Celebrity Playhouse	Mrs. Callifer	Episode: "The Potting Shed"; Nominated – British Academy Television Award for Best Actress
1983	Number 10	Mrs. Gladstone	Episode: "Old Glad Eyes"

== Sound recordings ==
Johnson can be heard as Emilia on the Caedmon Records production of Othello (with Cyril Cusack and Anna Massey), as Cecily on the all-star 1953 recording of The Importance of Being Earnest (with John Gielgud and Edith Evans), as Aline Solness in The Master Builder, as Lady Britomart in Major Barbara, and reading Katherine Mansfield stories and excerpts from Mrs. Dalloway and To the Lighthouse.
