= Mortimer Caplin =

IRS Commissioner and tax attorney (1916–2019)

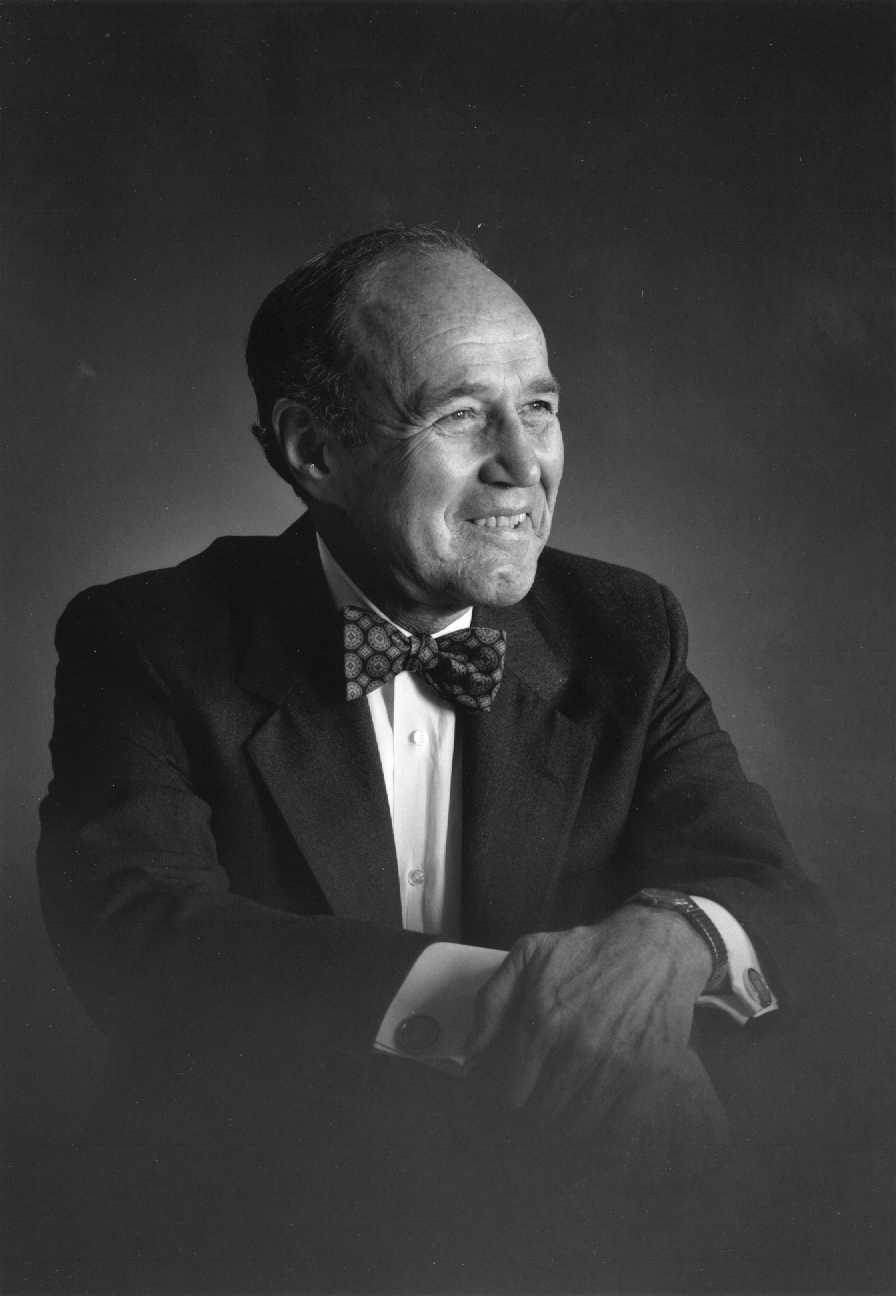

Commissioner of Internal Revenue
- In office February 7, 1961 – July 10, 1964
- President: John F. Kennedy; Lyndon B. Johnson
- Preceded by: Charles I. Fox (Acting)
- Succeeded by: Bernard M. Harding (Acting)

Personal details
- Born: Mortimer Maxwell Caplin; July 11, 1916 New York City, U.S.
- Died: July 15, 2019 (aged 103) Chevy Chase, Maryland, U.S.
- Party: Democratic
- Education: University of Virginia (BS, LLB); New York University (LLM, SJD)

Mortimer Maxwell Caplin (July 11, 1916 – July 15, 2019) was an American lawyer and educator, and the founding member of Caplin & Drysdale, Chartered. He served under President John F. Kennedy on the Task Force on Taxation and later as Commissioner of Internal Revenue. In 1963, he appeared on the cover of Time magazine, which credited him as a leading tax expert working closely with Treasury Secretary Henry H. Fowler. During World War II, he served in the United States Navy and took part in the invasion of Normandy. Later he served as an adjunct professor at The George Washington University Law School and the University of Miami School of Law. His contributions were recognized with numerous honors, including the Légion d'honneur awarded by the president of the French Republic.

== Early life ==
Caplin was born in New York City, the son of Lillian (Epstein) and Daniel Caplin, who were Jewish. Caplin held a B.S. degree, Phi Beta Kappa, from the University of Virginia, where he was also a member of the school's prestigious Raven Society. He was an Order of the Coif graduate of the University of Virginia Law School, where he earned his LL.B. degree. Caplin also achieved a Doctor of Juridical Science from New York University, and several honorary doctorate in law degrees (LL.D.) from Washington College, the University of South Carolina, and Saint Michael's College.

First in his class at the University of Virginia School of Law, and editor-in-chief of Virginia Law Review, Caplin served as a law clerk to U.S. Circuit Judge Armistead M. Dobie. He then practiced law in New York City from 1941 to 1950, with time out for military service in the United States Navy. During the invasion of Normandy, he served as U.S. Navy beachmaster, cited as member of initial landing force on Omaha Beach and the recipient of the French Legion of Honor.

In 1950, Caplin returned to UVA as professor of law, specializing in tax and corporate law and publishing extensively in these fields. He spent 33 years on the faculty of the U-Va. law school and jokingly credited his Internal Revenue Service appointment in 1961 to his “good judgment — the good judgment to have both Bobby and Teddy Kennedy as students at the University of Virginia and to pass them both. He also served as adjunct professor of law at The George Washington University Law School from 1965 to 1966 and at the University of Miami School of Law from 1967 to 1970. Additionally, Caplin engaged in practice as counsel to a Virginia law firm. He turned 100 in July 2016.

== Government experience ==
Following President John F. Kennedy's election, Caplin served on the President's Task Force on Taxation and in January 1961 was appointed U.S. Commissioner of Internal Revenue. During his tenure at the Internal Revenue Service (IRS), he appeared on the cover of Time magazine, which describes him as a "highly respected tax expert" and credits him for influencing Kennedy's tax proposals. While he was commissioner, Kennedy also visited the IRS, the first time a U.S. president had visited IRS headquarters. Caplin remained at the IRS until July 1964, when he resigned to form the law firm of Caplin & Drysdale. Upon his leaving, The Washington Post published an article about Caplin's accomplishments as commissioner, which included helping to tighten the administration of tax laws, building the IRS's public image, and implementing a nationwide computer system centralized with a basic taxpayer master file. In his law practice, Caplin used his broad experience dealing with the U.S. Treasury Department, the Internal Revenue Service, the U.S. Justice Department, and the tax committees of the United States Congress. His area of expertise included tax planning, dispute resolution, trials and appeals.

== Professional activities ==
Caplin served as trustee of many educational and charitable organizations: UVA Board of Visitors; UVA Law School Foundation; George Washington University; University of the Virgin Islands; Peace Through Law Education Fund; Community Children's Theatre; Arena Stage; Shakespeare Theatre; Wolf Trap Foundation. He served for over ten years as chair of the UVA Council for the Arts and was Honorary Chair. Caplin served on the following boards: American Bar Foundation, Governing Council of UVA's Miller Center of Public Affairs; Board of Directors, Environmental & Energy Study Institute; and Chair, Board of Advisors of The Hospitality & Information Service for Diplomats ("THIS"), Washington, D.C. He was also on the board of directors of Danaher Corporation, The Fairchild Corporation, Fairchild Industries, Inc., and Presidential Realty Corporation.

== The arts ==
Caplin's passion for the arts can be traced back to his college years when he was president of the Virginia Players' and performed the title role in their production of Shakespeare's Julius Caesar on February 5, 1938. In 1942, he married screenwriter Ruth Sacks, whose film "Mrs. Palfrey at the Claremont" was released in 2005. The film won "Best Film in Japan" in 2010.

Together, Mortimer and Ruth created a visiting artist fund for the Department of Drama at the University of Virginia in March 1999, enabling the department to bring in actors, directors, designers, and scholars regarded as leaders in the profession. He initiated several key projects as chair of the Council for the Arts including the Arts Enhancement Fund, which allowed department chairs and program directors to finance new arts initiatives. Under Caplin's leadership, the fund raised millions of dollars, which resulted in the successful development of the Carr's Hill arts district, later known as the Arts Grounds.

The Caplins donated $4 million to the University of Virginia to help build the Ruth Caplin Theatre, located inside the university's new $13.5 million drama building addition. On April 27, 2013, the University of Virginia honored Ruth in a ribbon cutting ceremony to celebrate the official opening of the brand new Ruth Caplin Theatre. The Ruth Caplin Theatre was designed by architect William L. Rawn, III, who designed The Music Center at Strathmore and other major public buildings and cultural facilities.

== Awards and honors ==
Caplin's contributions were recognized by numerous organizations over many years. The University of Virginia presented him the Supreme Court Justice William J. Brennan Jr. Award from its National Advocacy Program as well as the Thomas Jefferson Medal in Law, the university's highest honor. Caplin also received an honorary Doctor of Laws from Washington College in Chestertown, Maryland. The American Bar Foundation honored him at the National World War II Museum in New Orleans founded by historian and author, Stephen Ambrose. He was also named "Chevalier" of the Légion d'honneur or Legion of Honor by the president of the French Republic for his contributions to the United States' decisive role in the liberation of France during World War II. The Maryland General Assembly issued an official citation in recognition of his appointment as "Chevalier" of the Legion of Honor.

Caplin was the star middleweight of a national championship boxing team as a University of Virginia undergraduate in the mid-1930s.

He also received the Medal of the Jubilee of Liberty, which was authorized by the governor of the Normandy Region. On leaving the U.S. government, he received the Alexander Hamilton Award, the highest award conferred by the secretary of the treasury, for his "distinguished leadership". He was also the recipient of the Achievement Award, Tax Society of New York University; Judge Learned Hand Human Relations Award, American Jewish Committee; Tax Executives Institute Distinguished Service Award; The Federal Bar Association's Kenneth S. Liles Award; The Miller Center of Public Affairs' Elizabeth Scott Award; Veterans of Foreign Wars Public Service Award; Virginia State Bar and Award.

He was granted Professor Emeritus from the University of Virginia, after having served as Professor of Law (1950–1961) and Visiting Professor of Law (1965–1987). He was a member of Phi Beta Kappa and Omicron Delta Kappa at the University of Virginia. Caplin was listed in the 2010 edition of The Best Lawyers in America in the specialty of Tax Law. Also, the Miller Center of Public Affairs hosted a prominent economic conference called the Mortimer Caplin Conference on the World Economy on December 10–11, 2009. Since its inception in 2008, the conference brings together leading experts to examine crucial economic issues on the global stage. He was also selected for the Veterans History Project, which preserves and presents personal accounts of American veterans in order to help future generations to better understand the realities of war.

== Family life and death ==
Caplin was married to Ruth Caplin until her death in 2014 at the age of 93. They were married for 72 years and had five children. Caplin died on July 15, 2019, four days after his 103rd birthday.

== See also ==
- Virginia Tax Review
