= When I Have Fears =

Poem by John Keats

"When I Have Fears" is an Elizabethan sonnet by the English Romantic poet John Keats. The 14-line poem is written in iambic pentameter and consists of three quatrains and a couplet. Keats wrote the poem between 22 and 31 January 1818. It was published (posthumously) in 1848 in Life, Letters, and Literary Remains, of John Keats, edited by Richard Monckton Milnes.

== Poem ==
When I have fears that I may cease to be
Before my pen has glean'd my teeming brain,
Before high-piled books, in charact'ry,
Hold like rich garners the full-ripen'd grain;
When I behold, upon the night's starr'd face,
Huge cloudy symbols of a high romance,
And think that I may never live to trace
Their shadows, with the magic hand of chance;
And when I feel, fair creature of an hour!
That I shall never look upon thee more,
Never have relish in the faery power
Of unreflecting love!—then on the shore
Of the wide world I stand alone, and think,
Till Love and Fame to nothingness do sink.

== Themes and language ==
"When I Have Fears" primarily explores death, the fear of it, and what it prevents Keats from doing. Using the phrase "cease to be" shows an emphasis on the life Keats will miss out on rather than simply death itself. The repetition of "before" represents the anxieties Keats has about what he cannot achieve before death..

References to nature also appear throughout the poem, including harvesting grain, the night sky, clouds, and the shore. Nature is a common theme in Romantic poetry, but in Keats' poem it demonstrates how essential and natural writing is to his being.

The theme of creating coincides with references to nature and beauty. The first quatrain equates writing to harvesting grain. Thoughts are tangible items to be grown into "high-piled books," as Keats feels he can allow his ideas to flourish if he only had a long enough life. The second quatrain contains more abstract concepts. Stars, cloudy symbols, shadows, reflect the intangible beauty of the world which Keats can also not attempt to understand because of a life cut short. The couplet shows abstract concepts of Love and Fame becoming tangible, though they sink to nothingness as Keats realizes he has no time to achieve them.

== Analysis ==
Keats, who died of tuberculosis at the age of 25, is often cited as fearing his own death. The fear may come from Keats' work as a medical student, where his sympathy for patients, as his friend Charles Brown believed, hindered his work. Keats was aware of the harm that could come to patients if he made any mistakes.

The first four lines express Keats' fear that he will die before he has written all the works he hopes to, "before [his] pen has glean'd [his] teeming brain." The symbols of the night sky and clouds that Keats "may never live to trace" can represent many things. The first is simply Keats' desire for literary expression and interpretation of the world around him. Another, though, is more philosophical. Keats' use of "shadows" can connect to Plato's Allegory of the Cave, which then represents his desire to understand life itself. The "fair creature of an hour," according to Richard Woodhouse, the man who advised Keats' publishers on legal and literary matters, refers to a woman Keats encountered at Vauxhall Gardens.

The final three lines where Keats stands alone and contemplates the end of life may represent a passive acceptance that life must end.

=== Rhyme scheme ===
"When I Have Fears" follows a rhyme scheme of ABAB CDCD EFEF GG (Shakespeare Sonnet). Shahidha Bari notes the rhyme scheme may reflect expectation. Readers expect the lines to rhyme with each other, as Keats anticipates the end of his life. The couplet and rhyme signals the end of the poem, as death signals the end of life.

== Similarities to Shakespeare ==
William Flesch notes the poem's echoes of Shakespeare's Antony and Cleopatra. Comparisons have also been made to Shakespeare's Sonnet 60 for references to time, endings, and the sea and to Sonnet 64 for references to time destroying man-made creations. The ideas of ‘shadows’ and ‘cloudy symbols’ also echo Shakespearean ideas of darkness referring to magic and the unknown. According to G.L. Kittridge, in Sonnets of Shakespeare, "Shadow, often in Shakespeare is contrasted with substance to express the particular sort of unreality while 'substance' expresses the reality."
