= Joan Plowright =

English actress (1929–2025)

The Right Honourable The Lady Olivier DBE
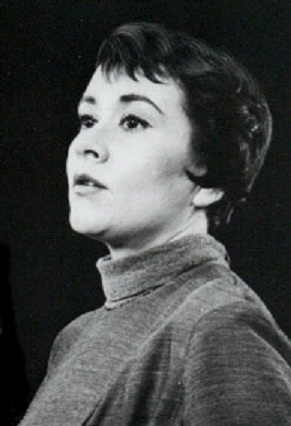
- Plowright in 1958
- Born: Joan Ann Plowright; 28 October 1929; Brigg, Lincolnshire, England
- Died: 16 January 2025 (aged 95); London, England
- Education: Old Vic Theatre School
- Occupation: Actress
- Years active: 1948–2009; 2017–2018
- Spouses: Roger Gage (m. 1953; div. 1960); Laurence Olivier (m. 1961; died 1989)
- Children: 3
- Relatives: David Plowright (brother)

Signature
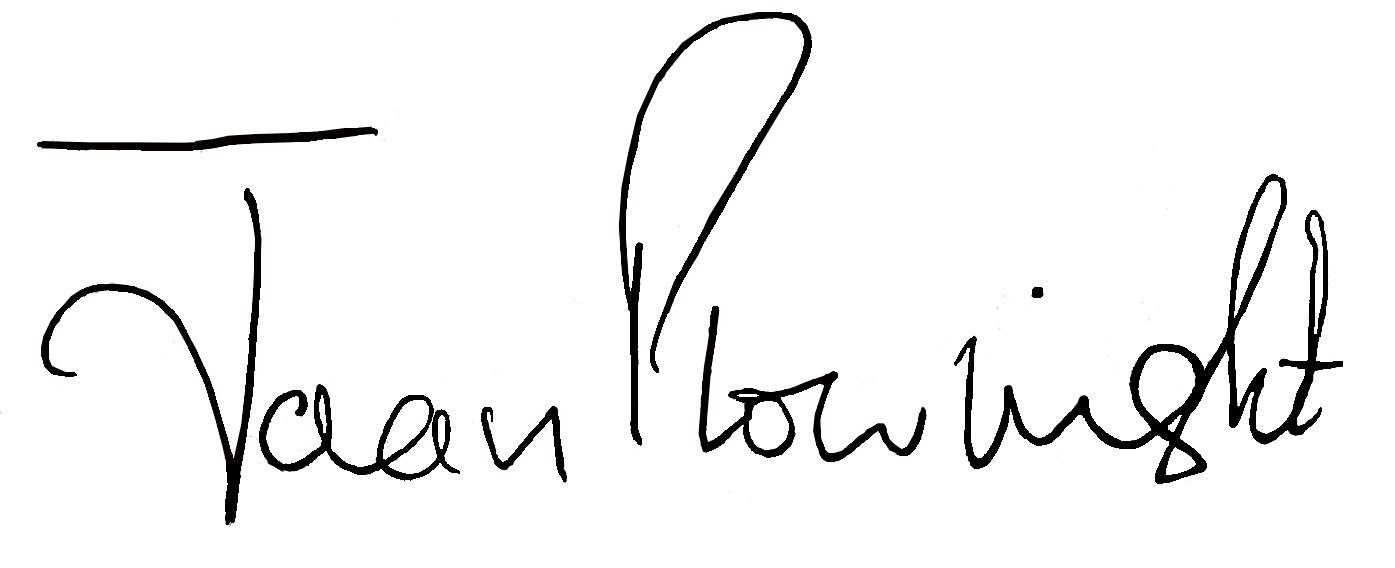

Dame Joan Ann Plowright (8 October 1929 – 16 January 2025) was an English actress whose career spanned eight decades. She received several accolades including two Golden Globe Awards, an Olivier Award, and a Tony Award as well as nominations for an Academy Award, two BAFTA Awards, and a Primetime Emmy Award. She was made a Dame by Queen Elizabeth II in 2004.

Plowright studied at the Old Vic Theatre School before acting onstage at the Royal National Theatre where she met her husband Laurence Olivier. She acted opposite him in the John Osborne play The Entertainer in West End in 1957 and on Broadway in 1958. She earned the Tony Award for Best Actress in a Play for her A Taste of Honey (1961). She won the Laurence Olivier Award for Filumena (1978).

She made her film debut in an uncredited role in Moby Dick (1956). She later won the Golden Globe Award for Best Supporting Actress – Motion Picture and was nominated for the Academy Award for Best Supporting Actress for Enchanted April (1991). She was BAFTA-nominated for her roles in The Entertainer (1960) and Equus (1977). She also acted in the films Uncle Vanya (1963), Three Sisters (1970), Avalon (1990), Dennis the Menace (1993), A Place for Annie (1994), 101 Dalmatians (1996), Jane Eyre (1996), Tea with Mussolini (1999), Bringing Down the House (2003) and Mrs. Palfrey at the Claremont (2005). She also voiced roles for the children's films Dinosaur (2000) and Curious George (2006).

On television she was nominated for the Primetime Emmy Award for Outstanding Supporting Actress in a Limited Series or Movie and won the Golden Globe Award for Best Supporting Actress – Series, Miniseries or Television Film for her role in the HBO television film Stalin (1992). She retired from acting due to macular degeneration in 2014. She made her final filmed appearance in the documentary Nothing Like a Dame (2018).

== Early life and education ==
Plowright was born on 28 October 1929 in Brigg, Lincolnshire, the daughter of Daisy Margaret (née Burton) and William Ernest Plowright, who was a journalist and newspaper editor. She attended Scunthorpe Grammar School and then trained at The Old Vic Theatre School.

== Career ==
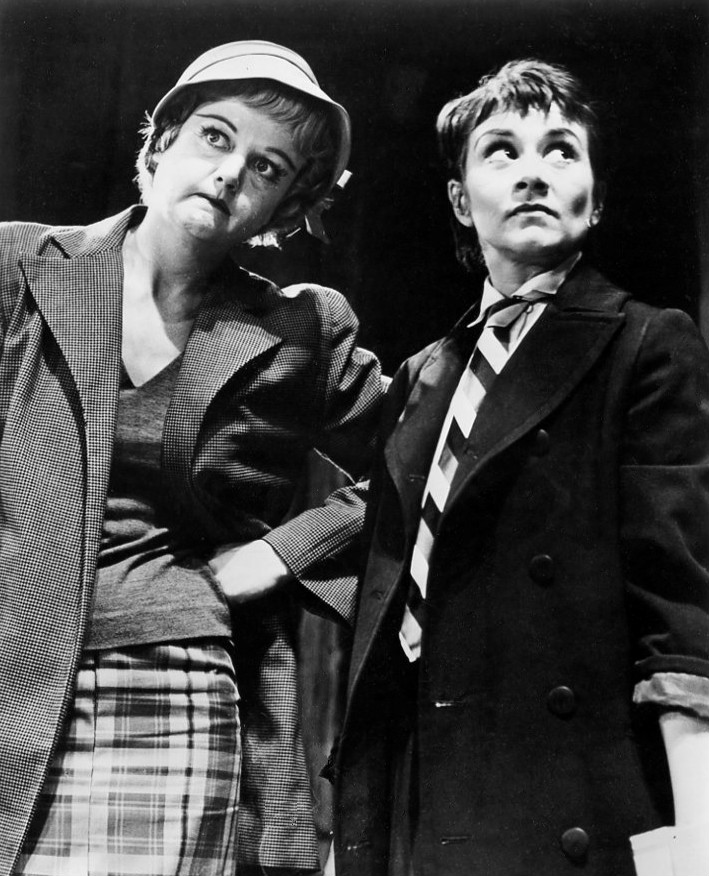
Plowright as Jo (right) with Angela Lansbury as Helen, in the 1961 Broadway production of A Taste of Honey

Plowright made her stage debut at Croydon in 1948 and her London debut in 1954. In 1956 she joined the English Stage Company at the Royal Court Theatre and was cast as Margery Pinchwife in The Country Wife. She appeared with George Devine in the Eugène Ionesco play The Chairs, and Shaw's Major Barbara and Saint Joan.

Plowright made her film debut in an uncredited role in Moby Dick (1956). In 1957, Plowright co-starred with Sir Laurence Olivier in the original London production of John Osborne's The Entertainer, taking over the role of Jean Rice from Dorothy Tutin when the play transferred from the Royal Court to the Palace Theatre. She continued to appear on stage and in films such as The Entertainer (1960). In 1961, she received a Tony Award for her role in A Taste of Honey on Broadway.

Through her marriage to Olivier, Plowright became closely associated with his work at the National Theatre from 1963 onwards. She also acted in the films Uncle Vanya (1963), Three Sisters (1970), and Equus (1977). In the 1990s, she began to appear more regularly in films, including I Love You to Death (1990); Avalon (1990); Enchanted April (1992), for which she won a Golden Globe Award and an Academy Award nomination; Dennis the Menace (1993), where she played Martha Wilson; A Place for Annie (1994); The Scarlet Letter (1995); Jane Eyre (1996); 101 Dalmatians (1996), where she played the dog nanny; Dance with Me (1998); and Tea With Mussolini (1999). Among her television roles, she won another Golden Globe Award and earned an Emmy Award nomination for the HBO film Stalin in 1992 as the Soviet dictator's mother-in-law. Her pair of 1992 performances (Enchanted April and Stalin) marked only the second time an actress (after Sigourney Weaver, for performances in 1988) won two Golden Globes in the same year; as of the January 2023 presentation, only Helen Mirren (for performances in 2006) and Kate Winslet (for performances in 2008) have duplicated this feat. In 1994, she was awarded the Women in Film Crystal Award.

In 2003, Plowright performed in the stage production Absolutely! (Perhaps) in London. She was appointed honorary president of the English Stage Company in March 2009, succeeding John Mortimer who died in January 2009. She was previously vice-president of the company. Her later films included Bringing Down the House (2003), Mrs. Palfrey at the Claremont (2005), and The Spiderwick Chronicles (2008), as well as voiced roles for the children's films Dinosaur (2000) and Curious George (2006). She made her final filmed appearance in the British documentary Nothing Like a Dame (2018), with her acting Dame friends Maggie Smith, Judi Dench and Eileen Atkins.

== Personal life ==
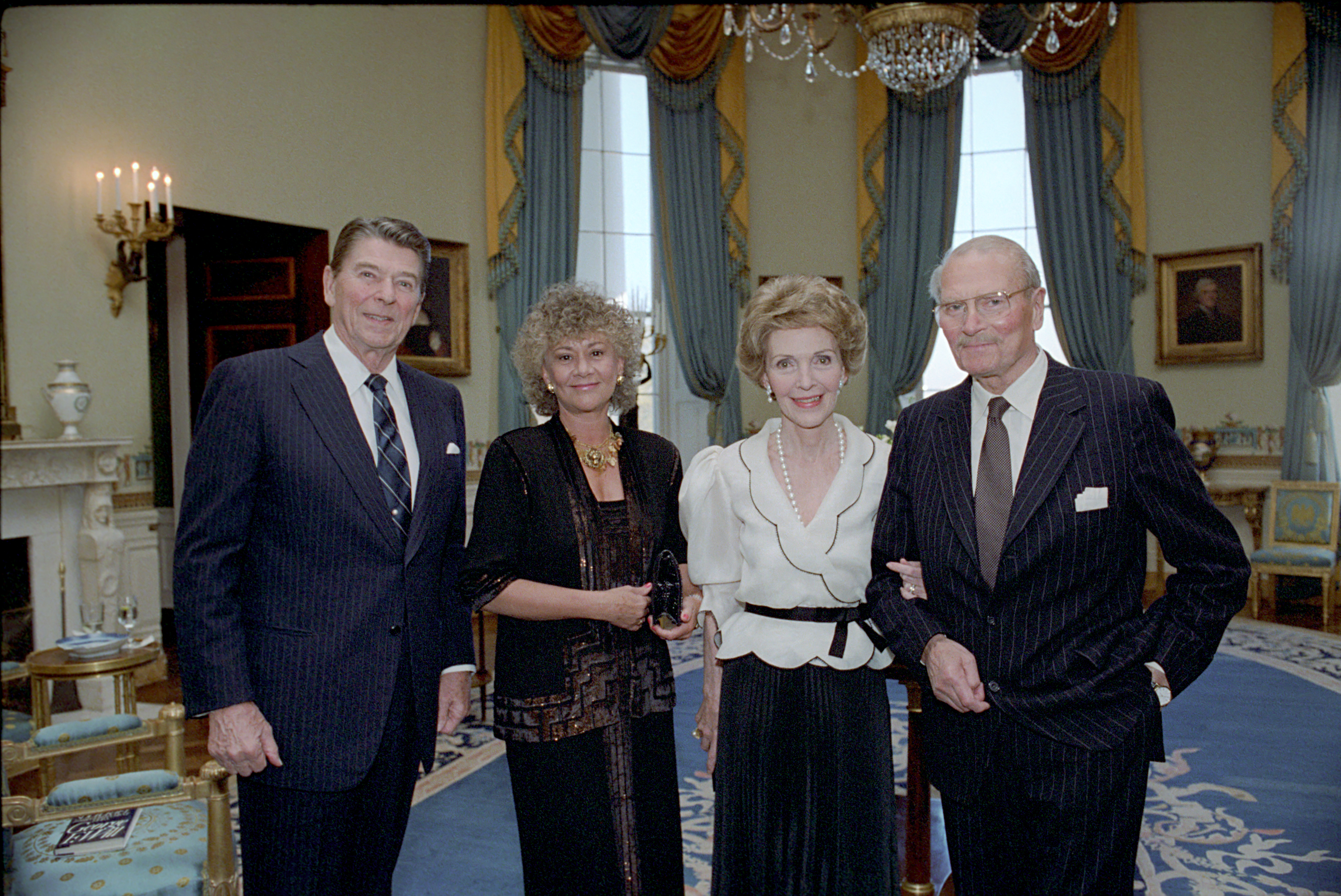
Plowright with Laurence Olivier, President Ronald Reagan and Nancy Reagan, 1983

=== Marriages and family ===
Plowright was first married to the actor Roger Gage in September 1953. She later divorced him and in 1961 married Laurence Olivier shortly after the end of Olivier's twenty-year marriage to the actress Vivien Leigh. Plowright and Olivier had three children together, all three of whom have worked in the theatre. The couple remained married until Olivier's death in 1989. Plowright's younger brother, David Plowright (1930–2006), was an executive at Granada Television.

She published her memoirs, And That's Not All, in 2001.

=== Illness and death ===
Plowright's vision declined steadily during the late 2000s and early 2010s due to macular degeneration. In 2014, she officially announced her retirement from acting because she had become legally blind.

Plowright died at Denville Hall in Northwood, London, on 16 January 2025, aged 95.

== Legacy and reputation ==
The Plowright Theatre in Scunthorpe is named in Plowright's honour.

In her obituary, Variety described Plowright as "perhaps the greatest Anglophone actor of the 20th century".

== Acting credits ==
=== Film ===
Film roles
| Year | Title | Role | Notes |
|---|---|---|---|
| 1956 | Moby Dick | Starbuck's wife | Uncredited |
| 1957 | Time Without Pity | Agnes Cole | |
| 1960 | The Entertainer | Jean Rice | |
| 1963 | Uncle Vanya | Sonya | |
| 1970 | Three Sisters | Masha Kulighina | |
| 1977 | Equus | Dora Strang | |
| 1982 | Britannia Hospital | Phyllis Grimshaw | |
| 1982 | Brimstone and Treacle | Norma Bates | |
| 1985 | Revolution | Mrs. Daisy McConnahay | |
| 1988 | Drowning by Numbers | Cissie Colpitts 1 | |
| 1988 | The Dressmaker | Nellie | |
| 1990 | I Love You to Death | Nadja | |
| 1990 | Avalon | Eva Krichinsky | |
| 1991 | Enchanted April | Mrs. Jane Fisher | |
| 1993 | Dennis the Menace | Mrs. Martha Wilson | |
| 1993 | Last Action Hero | Teacher | |
| 1994 | A Pin for the Butterfly | Grandma | |
| 1994 | Widows' Peak | Mrs. Dawn Doyle-Counihan | |
| 1995 | The Scarlet Letter | Harriet Hibbons | |
| 1995 | A Pyromaniac's Love Story | Mrs. Wendy Linzer | |
| 1995 | Hotel Sorrento | Marge Morrisey | |
| 1996 | 101 Dalmatians | Nanny | |
| 1996 | Surviving Picasso | Françoise's Grandmother | |
| 1996 | Mr. Wrong | Mrs. Jessica Crawford | |
| 1996 | Jane Eyre | Mrs. Maddie Fairfax | |
| 1997 | The Assistant | Mrs. Ida Bober | |
| 1998 | Dance with Me | Bea Johnson | |
| 1999 | Tom's Midnight Garden | Mrs. Ortensia Bartholomew | |
| 1999 | Tea with Mussolini | Mary Wallace | |
| 2000 | Dinosaur | Baylene | Voice |
| 2000 | Back to the Secret Garden | Martha Sowerby | |
| 2002 | Global Heresy | Lady Foxley | |
| 2002 | Callas Forever | Sarah Keller | |
| 2003 | Bringing Down the House | Virginia Arness | |
| 2003 | I Am David | Sophie | |
| 2004 | George and the Dragon | Mother Superior | |
| 2005 | Mrs. Palfrey at the Claremont | Mrs. Sarah Palfrey | |
| 2006 | Goose on the Loose | Beatrice Fairfield | |
| 2006 | Curious George | Victoria Plushbottom | Voice |
| 2008 | The Spiderwick Chronicles | Aunt Lucinda Spiderwick | |
| 2009 | Knife Edge | Marjorie | |
| 2018 | Nothing Like a Dame | Herself | Documentary |

=== Television ===
Television roles
| Year | Title | Role | Notes |
|---|---|---|---|
| 1951 | Sara Crewe | Winnie | 4 episodes |
| 1954 | BBC Sunday-Night Theatre | Adriana | 3 episodes |
| 1955 | Moby Dick—Rehearsed | A Young Actress/Pip | Uncompleted and lost Orson Welles film |
| 1958 | Sword of Freedom | Lisa Giocondo | Episode: "The Woman in the Picture" |
| 1959 | Theatre Night | Arlette Le Boeuf | Episode: Hook, Line, and Sinker |
| 1959 | World Theatre | Lady Teazle | Episode: The School for Scandal |
| 1959 | ITV Play of the Week | Winnie Verloc | Episode: The Secret Agent |
| 1959 | ITV Television Playhouse | Jane Maxwell | Episode: Odd Man In |
| 1967 | NET Playhouse | Sonya | Episode: Uncle Vanya |
| 1970 | ITV Playhouse | Lisa | Episode: "The Plastic People" |
| 1970 | ITV Sunday Night Theatre | Viola/Sebastian | Episode: "Twelfth Night" |
| 1973 | The Merchant of Venice | Portia | Film |
| 1978 | Saturday, Sunday, Monday | Rosa | Film |
| 1978 | Daphne Laureola | Lady Pitts | Film |
| 1980 | The Diary of Anne Frank | Mrs Frank | US film |
| 1982 | All for Love | Edith | Episode: "A Dedicated Man" |
| 1983 | Wagner | Mrs Taylor | Episode: "1.2" |
| 1986 | The Importance of Being Earnest | Lady Bracknell | Film |
| 1987 | Theatre Night | Meg Bowles | Episode: "The Birthday Party" |
| 1989 | And a Nightingale Sang | Mam | Film |
| 1990 | Sophie | Sophie | Film |
| 1991 | The House of Bernarda Alba | La Poncia | Film |
| 1992 | Stalin | Olga | Film |
| 1992 | Driving Miss Daisy | Daisy Werthan | Film |
| 1993 | Screen Two | Mrs Monro | Episode: "The Clothes in the Wardrobe"; released in the US as The Summer House |
| 1994 | The Return of the Native | Mrs Yeobright | Film |
| 1994 | A Place for Annie | Dorothy | Film |
| 1994 | On Promised Land | Mrs Appletree | Film |
| 1998–1999 | Encore! Encore! | Marie Pinoni | 12 episodes |
| 1998 | Aldrich Ames: Traitor Within | Jeanne Vertefeuille | Film |
| 1998 | This Could Be the Last Time | Rosemary | Film |
| 2000 | Frankie & Hazel | Phoebe Harkness | Film |
| 2001 | Bailey's Mistake | Aunt Angie | Film |
| 2001 | Scrooge and Marley | Narrator | Film |

=== Theatre ===
Theatre roles
| Year | Title | Role | Venue |
|---|---|---|---|
| 1948 | If Four Walls Told | Hope (stage debut) | Croydon Repertory Theatre, England |
| 1954 | The Merry Gentlemen | Allison | Bristol Old Vic, England |
| 1954 | The Duenna | Donna Clara | Westminster Theatre, London |
| 1955 | Moby Dick | Pip | Duke of York's Theatre, London |
| 1956 | The Crucible | Mary Warren | Royal Court Theatre, London |
| 1956 | Don Juan | Baptista | Royal Court Theatre |
| 1956 | The Death of Satan | Receptionist | Royal Court Theatre |
| 1956 | Cards of Identity | Miss Tray | Royal Court Theatre |
| 1956 | The Good Woman of Setzuan | Mrs. Shin | Royal Court Theatre |
| 1957 | The Country Wife | Margery Pinchwife | Royal Court Theatre; Adelphi Theatre, London |
| 1957 | The Making of Moo | Elizabeth Compton | Royal Court Theatre |
| 1957 | The Entertainer | Jean Rice | Palace Theatre, London |
| 1958 | The Lesson | The Student | Phoenix Theatre, Off-Broadway |
| 1958 | The Chairs | Old Woman | Phoenix Theatre, Off-Broadway |
| 1958 | The Entertainer | Jean Rice | Royale Theatre, Broadway |
| 1958 | Major Barbara | Major Barbara | Royal Court Theatre |
| 1958 | Hook, Line and Sinker | Arlette | Piccadilly Theatre, London |
| 1959 | Roots | Beatie Bryant | Belgrade Theatre, Coventry; Royal Court Theatre; Duke of York's Theatre |
| 1960 | Rhinoceros | Daisy | Royal Court Theatre |
| 1960 | A Taste of Honey | Josephine | Booth Theatre, Broadway |
| 1962 | The Chances | Another Constatia | Chichester Festival Theatre, England |
| 1962–1963 | Uncle Vanya | Sonya | Chichester Festival Theatre; Old Vic Theatre, London |
| 1963 | Saint Joan | Saint Joan | Old Vic Theatre |
| 1964 | Hobson's Choice | Maggie Hobson | Old Vic Theatre |
| 1964 | The Master Builder | Hilda Wangel | Old Vic Theatre |
| 1967–1968 | Much Ado About Nothing | Beatrice | Old Vic Theatre |
| 1967–1968 | Three Sisters | Masha | Old Vic Theatre |
| 1967–1968 | Tartuffe | Dorine | Old Vic Theatre |
| 1968 | The Advertisement | Teresa | Old Vic Theatre |
| 1968 | Love's Labour's Lost | Rosaline | Old Vic Theatre |
| 1969 | Back to Methuselah, Part II | Voice of Lilith | Old Vic Theatre |
| 1970 | The Merchant of Venice | Portia | Cambridge Theatre, London; Old Vic Theatre |
| 1971 | A Woman Killed with Kindness | Mistress Anne Frankford | New Theatre, London |
| 1971 | The Rules of the Game | Silla | New Theatre |
| 1972 | The Doctor's Dilemma | Jennifer Dubedat | Chichester Festival Theatre |
| 1972 | The Taming of the Shrew | Katharina | Chichester Festival Theatre |
| 1973 | Rosmersholm | Rebecca West | Greenwich Theatre, London |
| 1973–1975 | Saturday, Sunday, Monday | Rosa | Old Vic Theatre, London; Queen's Theatre, London |
| 1974 | Eden End | Stella Kirby | Old Vic Theatre |
| 1975 | The Seagull | Irena Arkadina | Lyric Theatre, London |
| 1975 | The Bed before Yesterday | Alma | Lyric Theatre |
| 1977 | Filumena | Filumena Marturano | Lyric Theatre |
| 1980 | Filumena | Filumena Marturano | St. James Theatre, Broadway |
| 1980 | Enjoy | Mam | Vaudeville Theatre, London |
| 1981 | Who's Afraid of Virginia Woolf? | Martha | Royal National Theatre, London |
| 1982 | Cavell | Edith Cavell | Chichester Festival Theatre |
| 1983 | The Cherry Orchard | Madame Ranevskaya | Haymarket Theatre, London |
| 1984 | The Way of the World | Lady Wishfort | Chichester Festival Theatre; Haymarket Theatre |
| 1985 | Mrs. Warren's Profession | Mrs. Warren | Royal National Theatre |
| 1986–1987 | The House of Bernarda Alba | La Poncia | Lyric Theatre, Hammersmith, London; Globe Theatre, London |
| 1990 | Time and the Conways | Mrs. Conway | Old Vic Theatre |

== Accolades and honours ==
Plowright was appointed a Commander of the Order of the British Empire (CBE) in the 1970 New Year Honours and was promoted to Dame Commander of the Order of the British Empire (DBE) in the 2004 New Year Honours.

She received an honorary Doctor of Letters (DLitt) from the University of Hull in 2001.

=== Awards and nominations ===
Plowright was nominated for all the Triple Crown of Acting awards (Academy Award, Emmy Award, and Tony Award), winning the Tony Award in 1961. In 1993, she also became the second of only four actresses (as of 2026) to have won two Golden Globe Awards in the same year.

Awards and nominations
| Award | Year | Category | Nominated work | Result | Ref. |
|---|---|---|---|---|---|
| Academy Awards | 1993 | Best Supporting Actress | Enchanted April | Nominated | |
| British Academy Film Awards | 1961 | Most Promising Newcomer to Leading Film Roles | The Entertainer | Nominated | |
| British Academy Film Awards | 1977 | Best Actress in a Supporting Role | Equus | Nominated | |
| Golden Globe Awards | 1993 | Best Supporting Actress – Motion Picture | Enchanted April | Won | |
| Golden Globe Awards | 1993 | Best Supporting Actress – Series, Miniseries or Television Film | Stalin | Won | |
| Primetime Emmy Awards | 1993 | Outstanding Supporting Actress in a Miniseries or Special | Stalin | Nominated | |
| Tony Awards | 1961 | Best Actress in a Play | A Taste of Honey | Won | |
| Laurence Olivier Awards | 1976 | Actress of the Year in a New Play | The Bed Before Yesterday | Nominated | |
| Laurence Olivier Awards | 1978 | Actress of the Year in a New Play | Filumena | Won | |
| Laurence Olivier Awards | 1980 | Actress of the Year in a New Play | Enjoy | Nominated | |

== Bibliography ==
- Plowright, Joan (2001). And That's Not All: The Memoirs of Joan Plowright. Weidenfeld & Nicolson. ISBN 978-0-297-64594-8.

== See also ==
- List of Academy Award winners and nominees from Great Britain
- List of actors with Academy Award nominations
- List of British actors
- List of Royal National Theatre Company actors
