= Laurence Olivier Award for Actress of the Year in a Revival =

Retired award for London theatre

- Awarded for: Actress of the Year in a Revival
- Location: England
- Presented by: Society of London Theatre
- First award: 1976
- Final award: 1988
- Website: officiallondontheatre.com/olivier-awards/

The Laurence Olivier Award for Actress of the Year in a Revival was an annual award presented by the Society of London Theatre in recognition of the "world-class status of London theatre." The awards were established as the Society of West End Theatre Awards in 1976, and renamed in 1984 in honour of English actor and director Laurence Olivier.

This award was presented from 1976 to 1984, then in 1985 the award was combined with the Actress of the Year in a New Play award to create the Best Actress award. The original Actress of the Year in a Revival award returned one last time, for the 1988 ceremony.

== Winners and nominees ==
=== 1970s ===
Year	Actor	Play	Character
1976
1976	Dorothy Tutin	A Month in the Country	Natalya Petrovna
1976	Susan Fleetwood	The Playboy of the Western World, Hamlet and Tamburlaine the Great	Margaret Flaherty / Ophelia / Zenocrate
1976	Geraldine McEwan	On Approval	Maria Wislack
1976	Googie Withers	The Cherry Orchard and An Ideal Husband	Ranevskaya / Lady Chiltern
1977
1977	Judi Dench	Macbeth	Lady Macbeth
1977	Francesca Annis	Troilus and Cressida	Cressida
1977	Susan Fleetwood	The Plough and the Stars	Nora
1977	Janet Suzman	Hedda Gabler	Hedda Gabler
1978
1978	Dorothy Tutin	The Double Dealer	Lady Plyant
1978	Eileen Atkins	Twelfth Night	Viola
1978	Ingrid Bergman	Waters of the Moon	Helen Lancaster
1978	Wendy Hiller	Waters of the Moon	Mrs. Whyte
1979
1979	Zoë Wanamaker	Once in a Lifetime	May Daniels
1979	Paola Dionisotti	The Taming of the Shrew	Katherina Minola
1979	Glenda Jackson	Antony and Cleopatra	Cleopatra
1979	Billie Whitelaw	Happy Days	Winnie

=== 1980s ===
Year	Actor	Play	Character
1980
1980	Judi Dench	Juno and the Paycock	Juno Boyle
1980	Maria Aitken	Private Lives	Amanda
1980	Geraldine McEwan	The Browning Version and Harlequinade	Millie Crocker-Harris / Edna Gosport
1980	Susan Tracy	Anna Christie	Anna Christie
1981
1981	Margaret Tyzack	Who's Afraid of Virginia Woolf?	Martha
1981	Sinéad Cusack	The Maid's Tragedy	Evadne
1981	Rosemary Harris	All My Sons	Kate Keller
1981	Penelope Wilton	Man and Superman	Ann Whitefield
1982
1982	Cheryl Campbell	A Doll's House	Nora Helmer
1982	Judi Dench	The Importance of Being Earnest	Lady Bracknell
1982	Felicity Kendal	The Second Mrs Tanqueray	Paula Jarman
1982	Mary Maddox	Rocket to the Moon	Belle Stark
1983
1983	Frances de la Tour	A Moon for the Misbegotten	Josie
1983	Sinéad Cusack	The Taming of the Shrew	Katherina Minola
1983	Rosemary Harris	Heartbreak House	Hesione Hushabye
1983	Helen Mirren	Antony and Cleopatra	Cleopatra
1984
1984	Vanessa Redgrave	The Aspern Papers	Miss Tina
1984	Glenda Jackson	Strange Interlude	Nina
1984	Juliet Stevenson	Measure for Measure	Isabella
1984	Zoë Wanamaker	Twelfth Night	Viola
1988
1988	Harriet Walter	A Question of Geography and Twelfth Night and Three Sisters	Dacha / Viola / Masha
1988	Estelle Kohler	Titus Andronicus and Hello and Goodbye	Tamora / Hester
1988	Vanessa Redgrave	A Touch of the Poet	Nora Melody
1988	Imelda Staunton	Uncle Vanya	Sonya

== See also ==
- Best Actress
- Drama Desk Award for Outstanding Actress in a Play
- Lists of acting awards
- Tony Award for Best Actress in a Play
