= 1988 Laurence Olivier Awards =

Edition of London theatre awards

The 1988 Laurence Olivier Awards were held in 1988 in London celebrating excellence in West End theatre by the Society of London Theatre.

== Winners and nominees ==
Details of winners (in bold) and nominees, in each award category, per the Society of London Theatre.

Play of the Year	Musical of the Year
**Our Country's Good by Timberlake Wertenbaker – Royal Court**; A Walk in the Woods by Lee Blessing – Comedy; Mrs. Klein by Nicholas Wright – National Theatre Cottesloe / Apollo; The Secret Rapture by David Hare – National Theatre Lyttelton	**Candide – Old Vic**; Babes in Arms – Regent's Park Open Air; Blood Brothers – Albery; The Wizard of Oz – RSC at the Barbican
Comedy of the Year
**Shirley Valentine by Willy Russell – Vaudeville**; Henceforward by Alan Ayckbourn – Vaudeville; Separation by Tom Kempinski – Comedy; The Common Pursuit by Simon Gray – Phoenix
Actor of the Year in a Revival	Actress of the Year in a Revival
**Brian Cox as Titus Andronicus in Titus Andronicus – RSC at the Barbican Pit**; Alun Armstrong as The Captain in The Father – National Theatre Cottesloe and as Barabas in The Jew of Malta – RSC at the Barbican; Antony Sher as Johnnie in Hello and Goodbye – Almeida and as Shylock in The Merchant of Venice – RSC at the Barbican; Tom Wilkinson as Dr. Tomas Stockmann in An Enemy of the People – Playhouse	**Harriet Walter as Dacha in A Question of Geography – RSC at the Barbican Pit and as Masha Sergeyevna Kulygina in Three Sisters and as Viola in Twelfth Night – RSC at the Barbican**; Estelle Kohler as Hester in Hello and Goodbye – Almeida and as Tamora in Titus Andronicus – RSC at The Pit; Vanessa Redgrave as Nora Melody in A Touch of the Poet – Comedy; Imelda Staunton as Sonya Alexandrovna Serebryakova in Uncle Vanya – Vaudeville
Actor of the Year in a New Play	Actress of the Year in a New Play
**David Haig as Second Lieutenant Ralph Clark in Our Country's Good – Royal Court**; Brian Cox as Paul Cash in Fashion – RSC at The Pit; Alec Guinness as Andrey Botvinnik in A Walk in the Woods – Comedy; David Suchet as Joe Green in Separation – Comedy	**Pauline Collins as Shirley Valentine-Bradshaw in Shirley Valentine – Vaudeville**; Gillian Barge as Melanie Klein in Mrs. Klein – National Theatre Cottesloe / Apollo; Saskia Reeves as Sarah Wise in Separation – Comedy; Penelope Wilton as Marion French in The Secret Rapture – National Theatre Lyttelton
Outstanding Performance of the Year by an Actor in a Musical	Outstanding Performance of the Year by an Actress in a Musical
**Con O'Neill as Mickey in Blood Brothers – Albery**; Bille Brown in as Miss Gulch and the Wicked Witch of the West The Wizard of Oz – RSC at the Barbican; Nickolas Grace Dr. Pangloss/Voltaire in Candide – Old Vic; Mickey Rooney as Mickey Rooney in Sugar Babies – Savoy	**Patricia Routledge as Old Lady in Candide – Old Vic**; Kiki Dee as Mrs. Johnstone in Blood Brothers – Albery; Ann Miller as Ann Miller in Sugar Babies – Savoy; Imelda Staunton as Dorothy Gale in The Wizard of Oz – RSC at the Barbican
Comedy Performance of the Year
**Alex Jennings as Gloumov in Too Clever by Half – Old Vic**; Kenneth Branagh as Celia in As You Like It – Phoenix; Lesley Sharp as Lipochka in A Family Affair – Donmar Warehouse; Sian Thomas as Vittoria in Countrymania – National Theatre Olivier
Outstanding Performance of the Year in a Supporting Role	Most Promising Newcomer of the Year in Theatre
**Eileen Atkins as The Queen in Cymbeline, as Paulina in The Winter's Tale – National Theatre Cottesloe and as Elderly Woman in Mountain Language – National Theatre Lyttelton**; Rudi Davies as Sara Melody in A Touch of the Poet – Comedy; Serena Evans as Zoe in Henceforward – Vaudeville; Tony Haygarth as Trinculo in The Tempest – National Theatre Cottesloe	**Richard Jones for directing Too Clever by Half – Old Vic**; Andrew Castell as Second Lieutenant James "Jimmy" Raleigh in Journey's End – Whitehall; Alan Cumming as Slupianek in The Conquest of the South Pole – Royal Court; Tim Luscombe for directing Easy Virtue – Garrick, Harlequinade and The Browning Version – Royalty
Director of the Year
**Deborah Warner for Titus Andronicus – RSC at the Barbican Pit**; Howard Davies for Cat on a Hot Tin Roof, The Secret Rapture – National Theatre Lyttelton and The Shaughraun – National Theatre Olivier; Max Stafford-Clark for Our Country's Good and The Recruiting Officer – Royal Court; David Thacker for A Touch of the Poet – Comedy and An Enemy of the People – Playhouse
Designer of the Year
**Richard Hudson for Andromache, Bussy D'Ambois, Candide, One Way Pendulum, The Tempest and Too Clever by Half – Old Vic**; William Dudley for Bartholomew Fair, Cat on a Hot Tin Roof, The Changeling, The Shaughraun and Waiting for Godot – National Theatre; Nick Ormerod for A Family Affair, Philoctetes and The Tempest – Donmar Warehouse; Mark Thompson for Measure for Measure and The Wizard of Oz – RSC at the Barbican
Outstanding Achievement of the Year in Dance	Outstanding Achievement in Opera
**The ensemble, Kirov Ballet – Royal Opera House**; Christopher Bruce for choreographing and Koen Onzia in Cruel Garden and Swansong, London Festival Ballet – Sadler's Wells; Cumbre Flamenca for its season – Sadler's Wells; Hayden Griffin for set designing Still Life at the Penguin Café – Royal Opera House; Arden Court and Shift, London Contemporary Dance Theatre – Sadler's Wells; Weighing the Heart, Second Stride – Sadler's Wells	**Leontina Vaduva in Manon, The Royal Opera – Royal Opera House**; Billy Budd, English National Opera – London Coliseum; Falstaff, Welsh National Opera – Royal Opera House; Madama Butterfly, The Royal Opera – Royal Opera House; Stefanos Lazaridis for set designing and David Pountney for producing Hansel and Gretel, English National Opera – London Coliseum; The Magic Flute, English National Opera – London Coliseum
Award for Outstanding Achievement
**Stars in the Morning Sky, Maly Theatre – Riverside Studios**; Nick Dear for adapting A Family Affair, Cheek by Jowl – Donmar Warehouse; David Thacker for directing An Enemy of the People – Young Vic / Playhouse; Théâtre de Complicité for its season – Almeida
Society Special Award
**Alec Guinness**

== Productions with multiple nominations and awards ==
The following 19 productions received multiple nominations:

- 4: Candide and The Wizard of Oz
- 3: A Family Affair, A Touch of the Poet, An Enemy of the People, Blood Brothers, Our Country's Good, Separation, The Secret Rapture, Titus Andronicus and Too Clever by Half
- 2: A Walk in the Woods, Cat on a Hot Tin Roof, Hello and Goodbye, Henceforward, Mrs. Klein, Shirley Valentine, Sugar Babies and The Shaughraun

The following five productions received multiple awards:

- 3: Candide and Too Clever by Half
- 2: Our Country's Good, Shirley Valentine and Titus Andronicus

== See also ==
- 42nd Tony Awards
