= 1980 Laurence Olivier Awards =

Edition of London theatre awards

1980 Society of West End Theatre Awards

The 1980 Society of West End Theatre Awards were held in 1980 in London celebrating excellence in West End theatre by the Society of West End Theatre. The awards would not become the Laurence Olivier Awards, as they are known today, until the 1984 ceremony.

== Winners and nominees ==
Details of winners (in bold) and nominees, in each award category, per the Society of London Theatre.

Play of the Year	Musical of the Year
**Nicholas Nickleby by Charles Dickens, adapted by David Edgar – RSC at the Aldwych**; A Lesson from Aloes by Athol Fugard – National Theatre; Duet for One by Tom Kempinski – Duke of York's; The Dresser by Ronald Harwood – Queen's	**Sweeney Todd – Theatre Royal Drury**; On the Twentieth Century – Her Majesty's; They're Playing Our Song – Shaftesbury; Tom Foolery – Criterion
Comedy of the Year
**Educating Rita by Willy Russell – Piccadilly**; Born in the Gardens by Peter Nichols – Globe; Make and Break by Michael Frayn – Theatre Royal Haymarket; Sisterly Feelings by Alan Ayckbourn – London Coliseum
Actor of the Year in a New Play	Actress of the Year in a New Play
**Roger Rees as Nicholas Nickleby in Nicholas Nickleby – RSC at the Aldwych**; Tom Courtenay as Norman in The Dresser – Queen's; David Schofield as John Merrick in The Elephant Man – National Theatre; Paul Scofield as Antonio Salieri in Amadeus – National Theatre	**Frances de la Tour as Stephanie Anderson in Duet for One – Duke of York's**; Shelagh Holliday as Gladys Bezuidenhout in A Lesson from Aloes – National Theatre; Glenda Jackson as Rose in Rose – Duke of York's; Joan Plowright as Connie Craven in Enjoy – Vaudeville
Actor of the Year in a Revival	Actress of the Year in a Revival
**Jonathan Pryce as Prince Hamlet in Hamlet – Royal Court**; Michael Gambon as Galileo Galilei in Life of Galileo – National Theatre; Alec McCowen as Arthur Gosport in Harlequinade and as Andrew Crocker-Harris in The Browning Version – National Theatre; Bob Peck as Iago in Othello – RSC at the Aldwych	**Judi Dench as Juno Boyle in Juno and the Paycock – RSC at the Aldwych**; Maria Aitken as Amanda Prynne in Private Lives – Duchess; Geraldine McEwan as Edna Gosport in Harlequinade and as Millie Crocker-Harris in The Browning Version – National Theatre; Susan Tracy as Anna Christie in Anna Christie – RSC at the Warehouse
Actor of the Year in a Musical	Actress of the Year in a Musical
**Denis Quilley as Sweeney Todd in Sweeney Todd – Theatre Royal Drury Lane**; Tom Conti as Vernon Gersch in They're Playing Our Song – Shaftesbury; John Diedrich as Curly McLain in Oklahoma – Palace; Denis Lawson as Joey Evans in Pal Joey – Albery	**Gemma Craven as Sonia Walsk in They're Playing Our Song – Shaftesbury**; Sheila Hancock as Mrs. Lovett in Sweeney Todd – Theatre Royal Drury Lane; Julia McKenzie as Lily Garland in On The Twentieth Century – Her Majesty's; Sian Phillips as Vera Simpson in Pal Joey – Albery
Comedy Performance of the Year
**Beryl Reid as Maud in Born in the Gardens – Globe**; Edward Duke as Reginald Jeeves in Jeeves Takes Charge – Fortune; Ben Kingsley as Master Frank Ford in The Merry Wives of Windsor – RSC at the Aldwych; Julie Walters as Susan "Rita" White in Educating Rita – Piccadilly
Actor of the Year in a Supporting Role	Actress of the Year in a Supporting Role
**David Threlfall as Angry Fellow and Smike in Nicholas Nickleby – RSC at the Aldwych**; Simon Callow as Wolfgang Amadeus Mozart in Amadeus – National Theatre; Edward Petherbridge as Newman Noggs in Nicholas Nickleby – RSC at the Aldwych; John Rogan as Joxer Daly in Juno and the Paycock – RSC at the Aldwych	**Suzanne Bertish as Fanny Squeers in Nicholas Nickleby – RSC at the Aldwych**; Lynn Dearth as Electra in The Greeks – RSC at the Aldwych; Prunella Scales as Mrs. Rogers in Make and Break – Theatre Royal Haymarket; Susan Tracy as Natasha Ivanova in Three Sisters – RSC at the Warehouse
Most Promising Newcomer of the Year in Theatre
**Edward Duke for creating, adapting and performing as Various in Jeeves Takes Charge – Fortune**; Alfred Molina as Jud Fry in Oklahoma – Palace; Gavin Richards for adapting, directing and performing as Maniac in Accidental Death of an Anarchist – Wyndham's; Robert Walker for directing Pal Joey – Albery
Director of the Year
**John Caird and Trevor Nunn for Nicholas Nickleby – RSC at the Aldwych**; John Barton for The Greeks – RSC at the Aldwych; John Dexter for Life of Galileo – National Theatre; Peter Hall for Amadeus – National Theatre
Designer of the Year
**Dermot Hayes and John Napier for Nicholas Nickleby – RSC at the Aldwych**; John Bury for Amadeus – National Theatre; John Gunter for Juno and the Paycock – RSC at the Aldwych; Jocelyn Herbert for Life of Galileo – National Theatre
Outstanding Achievement of the Year in Ballet
**Gloria by The Royal Ballet – Royal Opera House**; Gaîté Parisienne by Ballet of the 20th Century – London Coliseum; Rhapsody by The Royal Ballet – Royal Opera House; Sphinx by London Festival Ballet – London Coliseum
Outstanding Achievement in Opera	Outstanding First Achievement of the Year in Opera or Ballet
**Così fan tutte, English National Opera – London Coliseum**; Julius Caesar, English National Opera – London Coliseum; The Turn of the Screw, English National Opera – London Coliseum; The Turn of the Screw, Kent Opera – Sadler's Wells	**Rosalind Plowright in The Turn of the Screw, English National Opera – London Coliseum**; Felicity Lott in Così fan tutte, English National Opera – London Coliseum; Michael Pink for choreographing 1914, London Festival Ballet – Royal Festival Hall; Roland Price in Danses concertantes, The Royal Ballet – Sadler's Wells
Society Special Award
**Ralph Richardson**

== Productions with multiple nominations and awards ==
The following 21 productions, including two operas, received multiple nominations:

- 7: Nicholas Nickleby
- 4: Amadeus
- 3: Juno and the Paycock, Life of Galileo, Pal Joey, Sweeney Todd and They're Playing Our Song
- 2: A Lesson from Aloes, Born in the Gardens, Così fan tutte, Duet for One, Educating Rita, Harlequinade, Jeeves Takes Charge, Make and Break, Oklahoma, On the Twentieth Century, The Browning Version, The Dresser, The Greeks and The Turn of the Screw

The following two productions received multiple awards:

- 6: Nicholas Nickleby
- 2: Sweeney Todd

== See also ==
- 34th Tony Awards
