= Laurence Olivier Award for Best Actress =

Annual award for London theatre

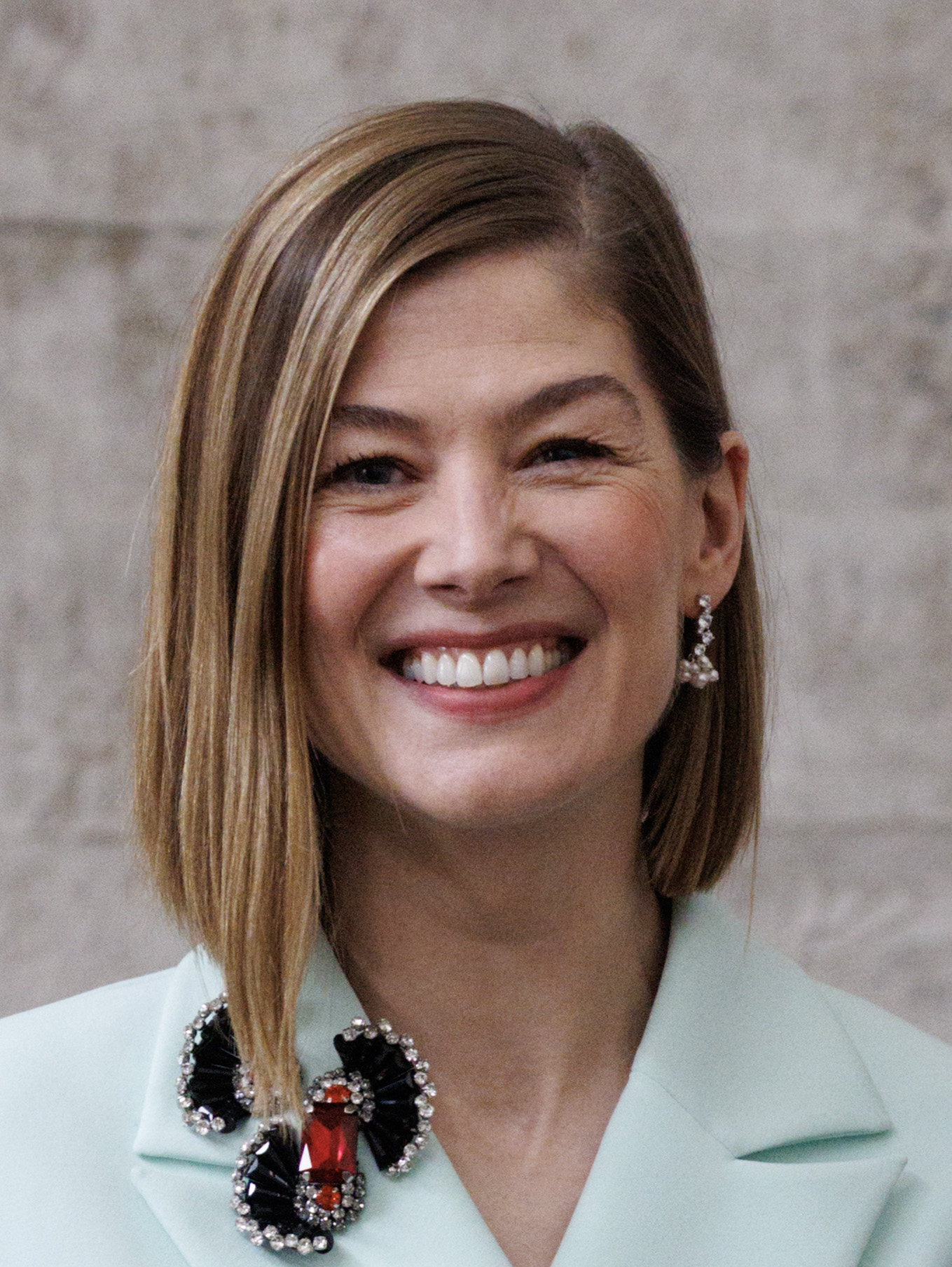
- 2026 Recipient: Rosamund Pike
- Awarded for: Best Actress in a Play
- Location: England
- Presented by: Society of London Theatre
- First award: 1985
- Currently held by: Rosamund Pike for Inter Alia (2026)
- Website: officiallondontheatre.com/olivier-awards/

The Laurence Olivier Award for Best Actress in a Play is an annual award presented by the Society of London Theatre in recognition of the "world-class status of London theatre." The awards were established as the Society of West End Theatre Awards in 1976, and renamed in 1984 in honour of English actor and director Laurence Olivier.

This award was introduced in 1985, as Actress of the Year, then retitled to its current name for the 1993 ceremony. Prior to this award, from 1976 to 1984 (and again in 1988), there was a pair of awards given each year for this general category, one for Actress of the Year in a New Play and the other for Actress of the Year in a Revival.

== Winners and nominees ==
Winners gallery

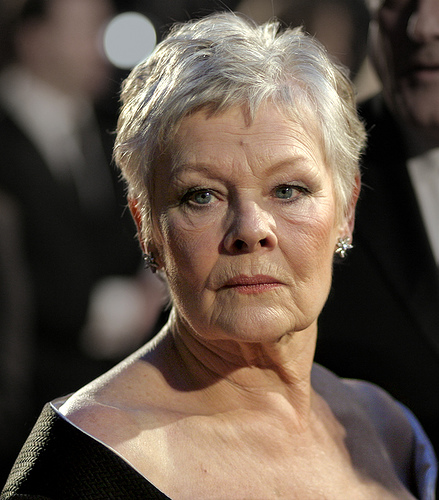
Judi Dench winner in 1977, 1980, 1983, 1987, and 1996

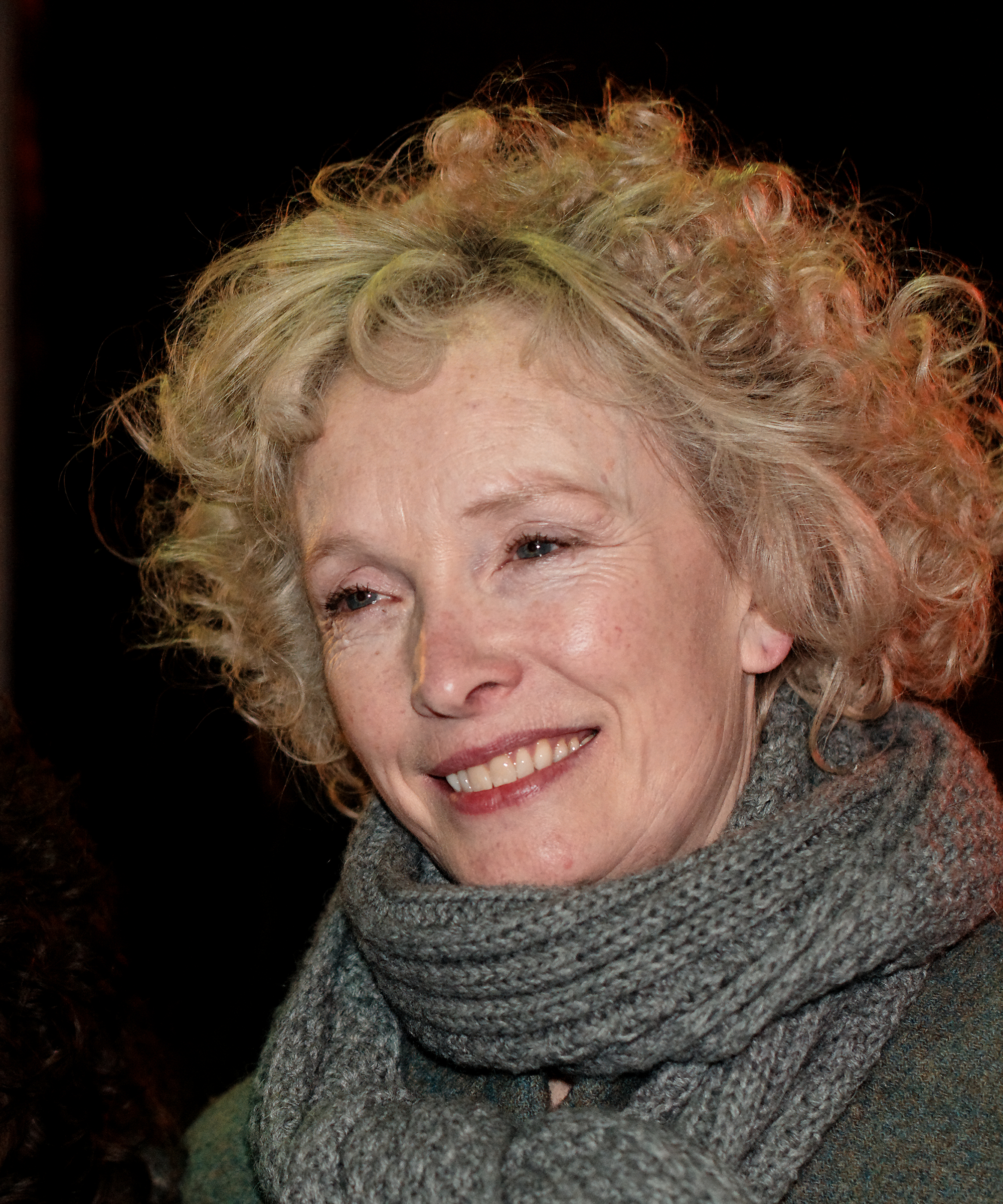
Lindsay Duncan winner in 1986 and 2002

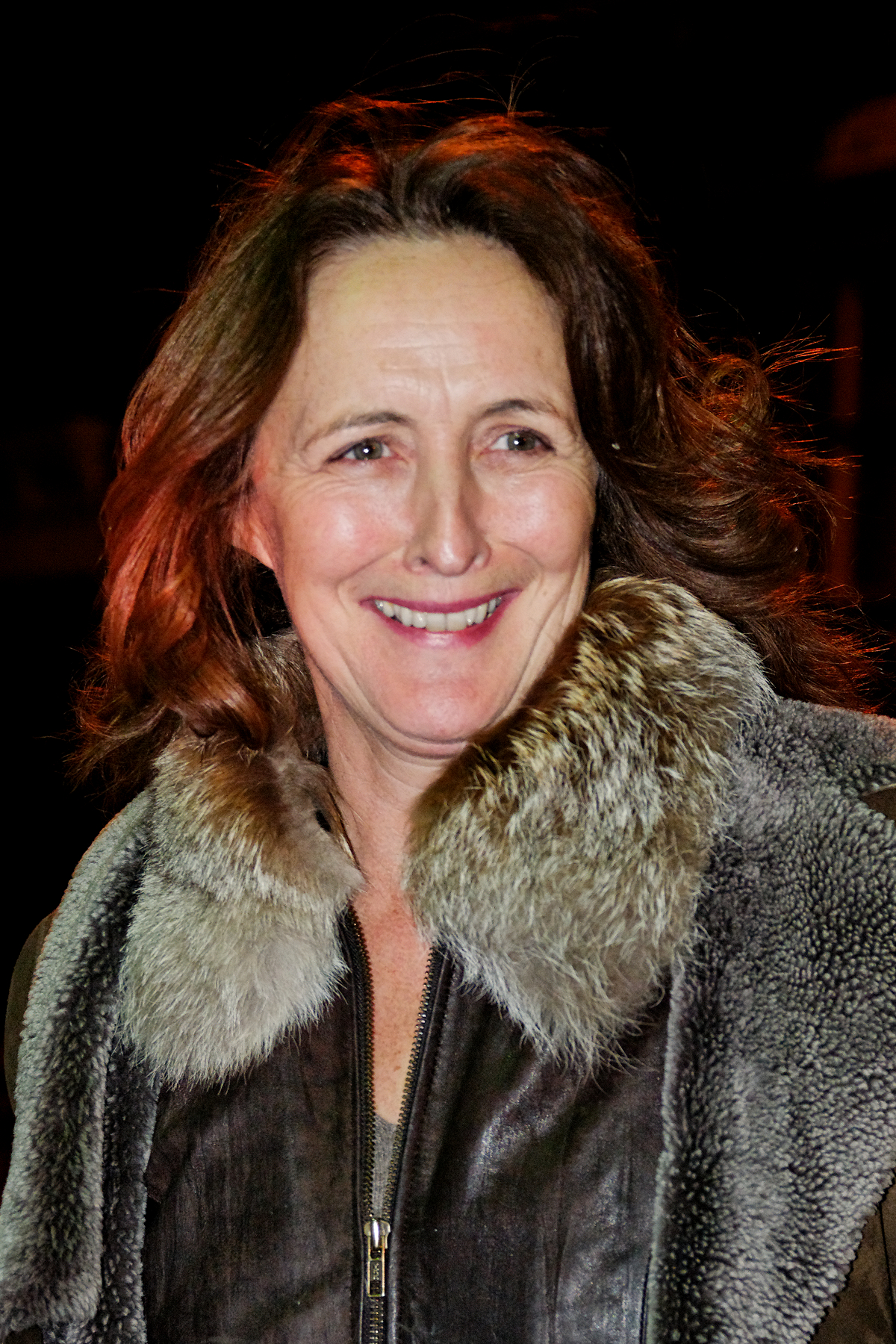
Fiona Shaw winner in 1989/1990 and 1994

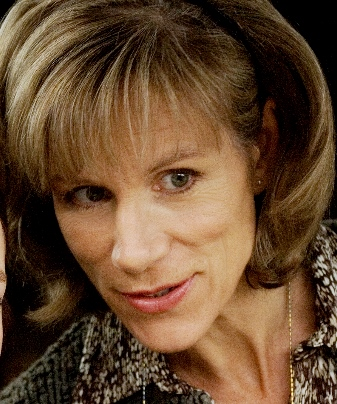
Juliet Stevenson won for Death and the Maiden (1992)

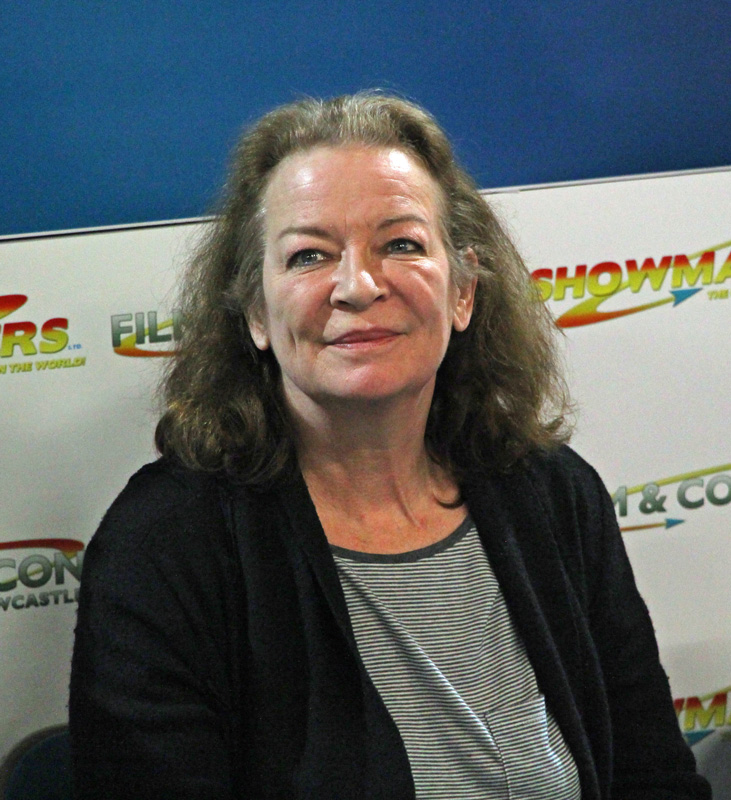
Claire Higgins winner in 1995, 2003, and 2005

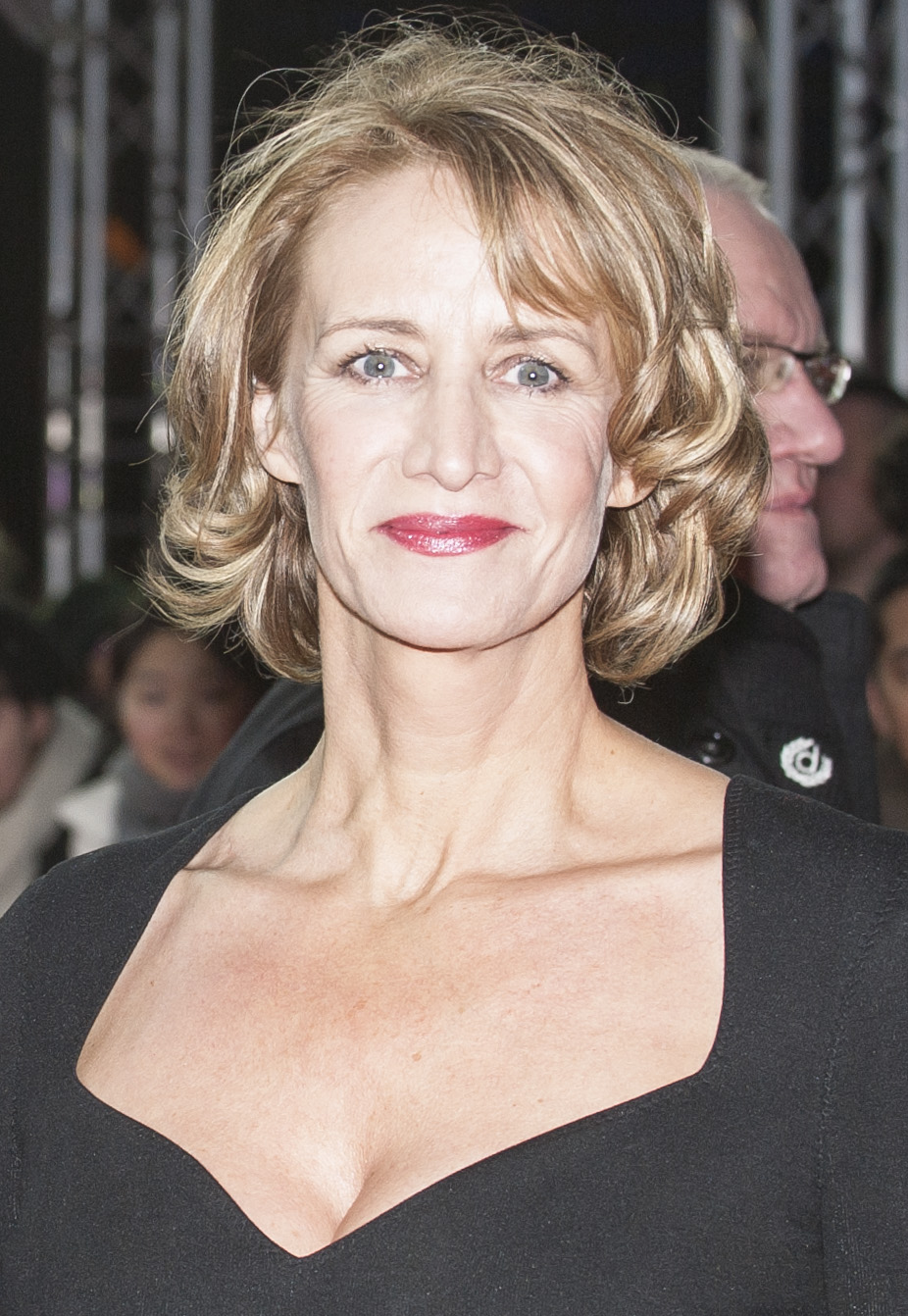
Janet McTeer won for A Doll's House (1997)

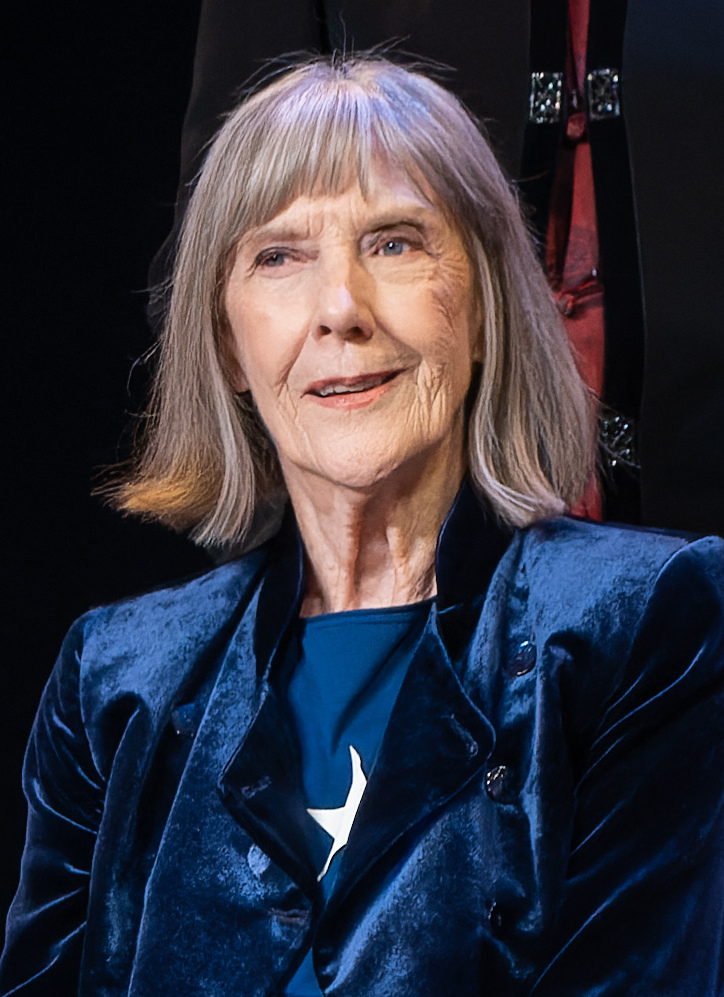
Eileen Atkins won for The Unexpected Man (1999) and Honour (2005)

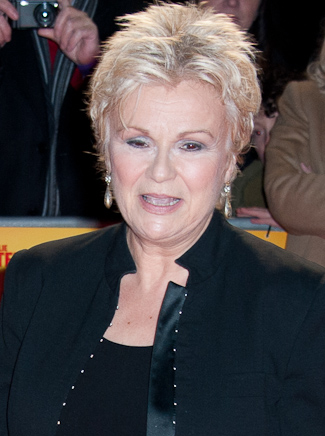
Julie Walters won for All My Sons (2001)

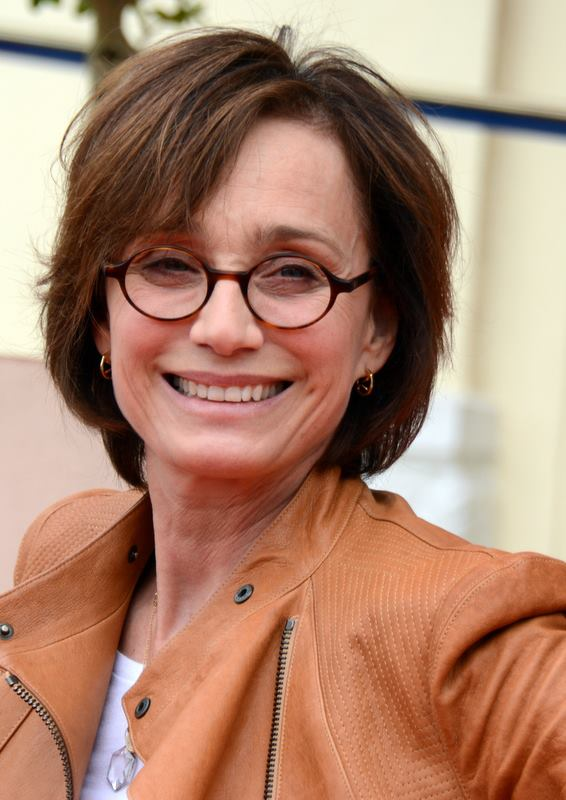
Kristin Scott Thomas won for The Seagull (2008)

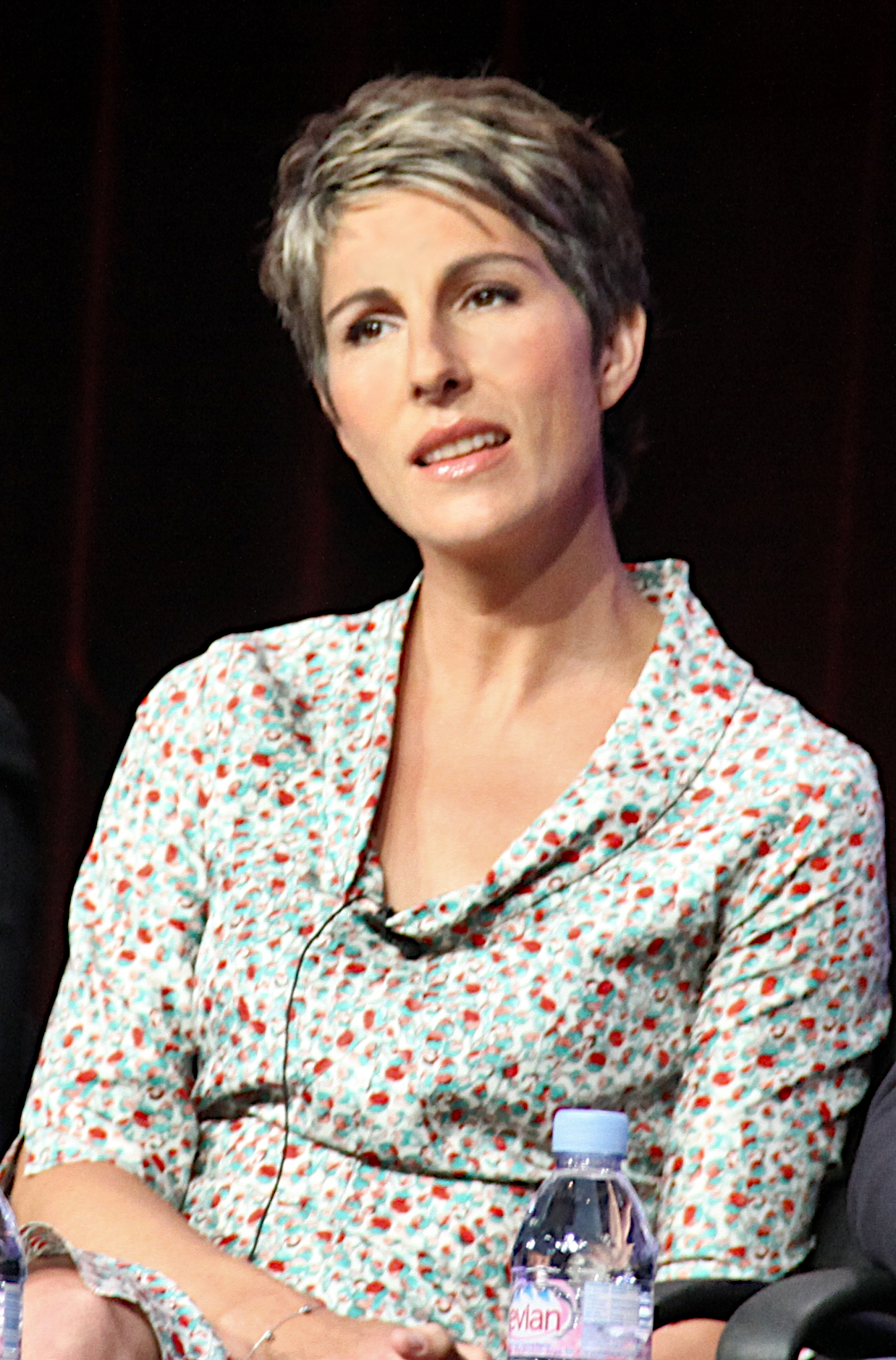
Tamsin Greig won for Much Ado About Nothing (2009)

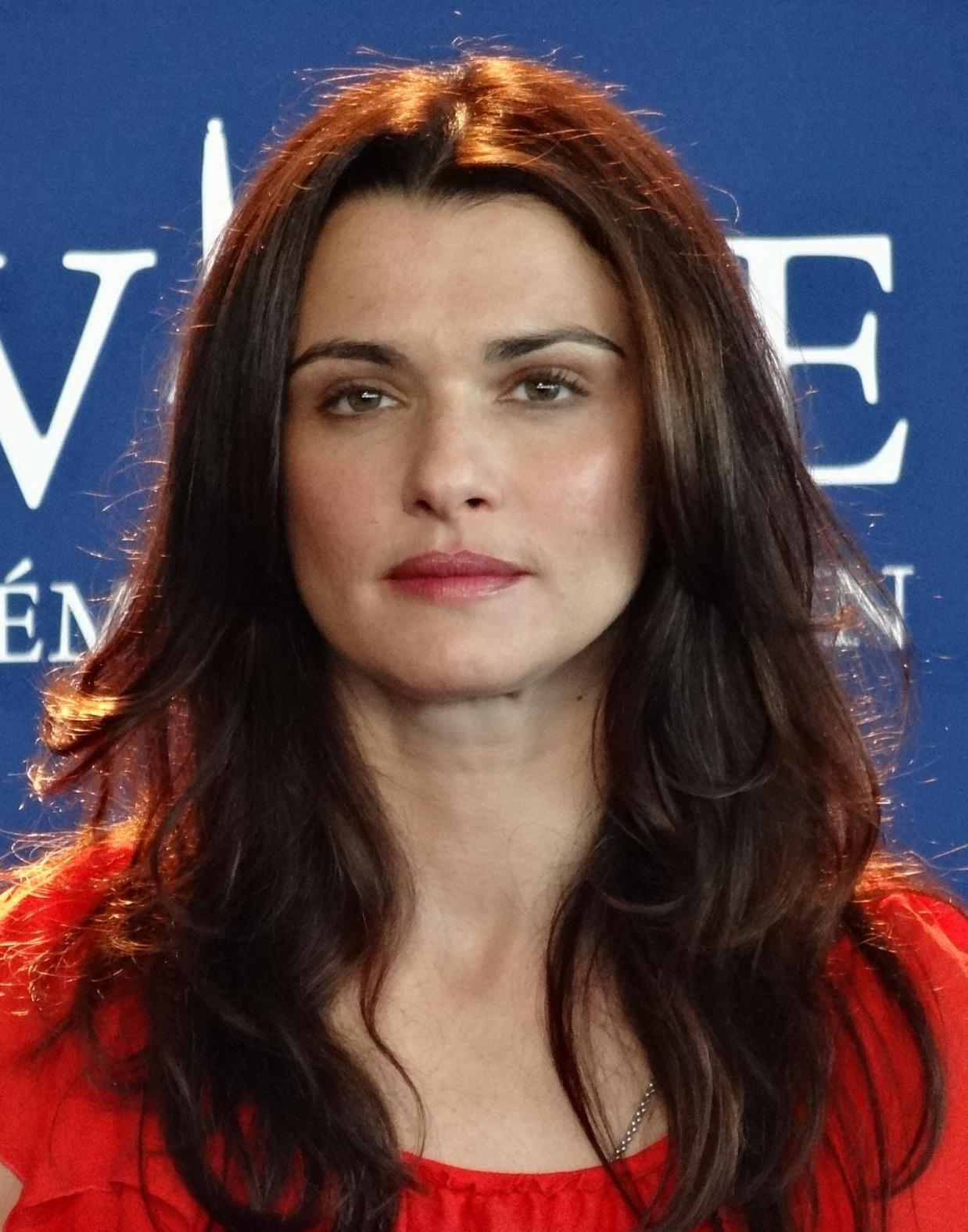
Rachel Weisz won for A Streetcar Named Desire (2010)

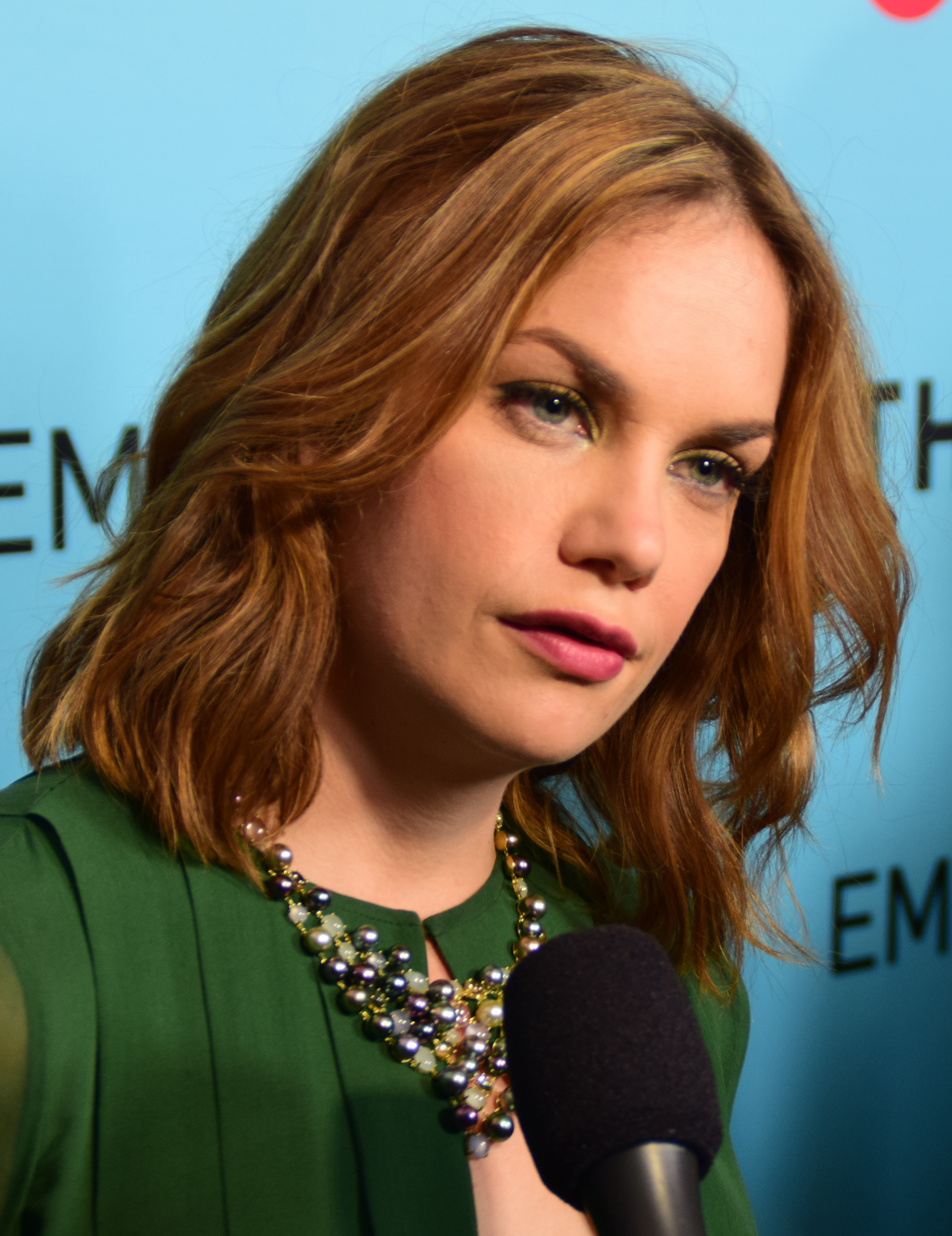
Ruth Wilson won for Anna Christie (2012)

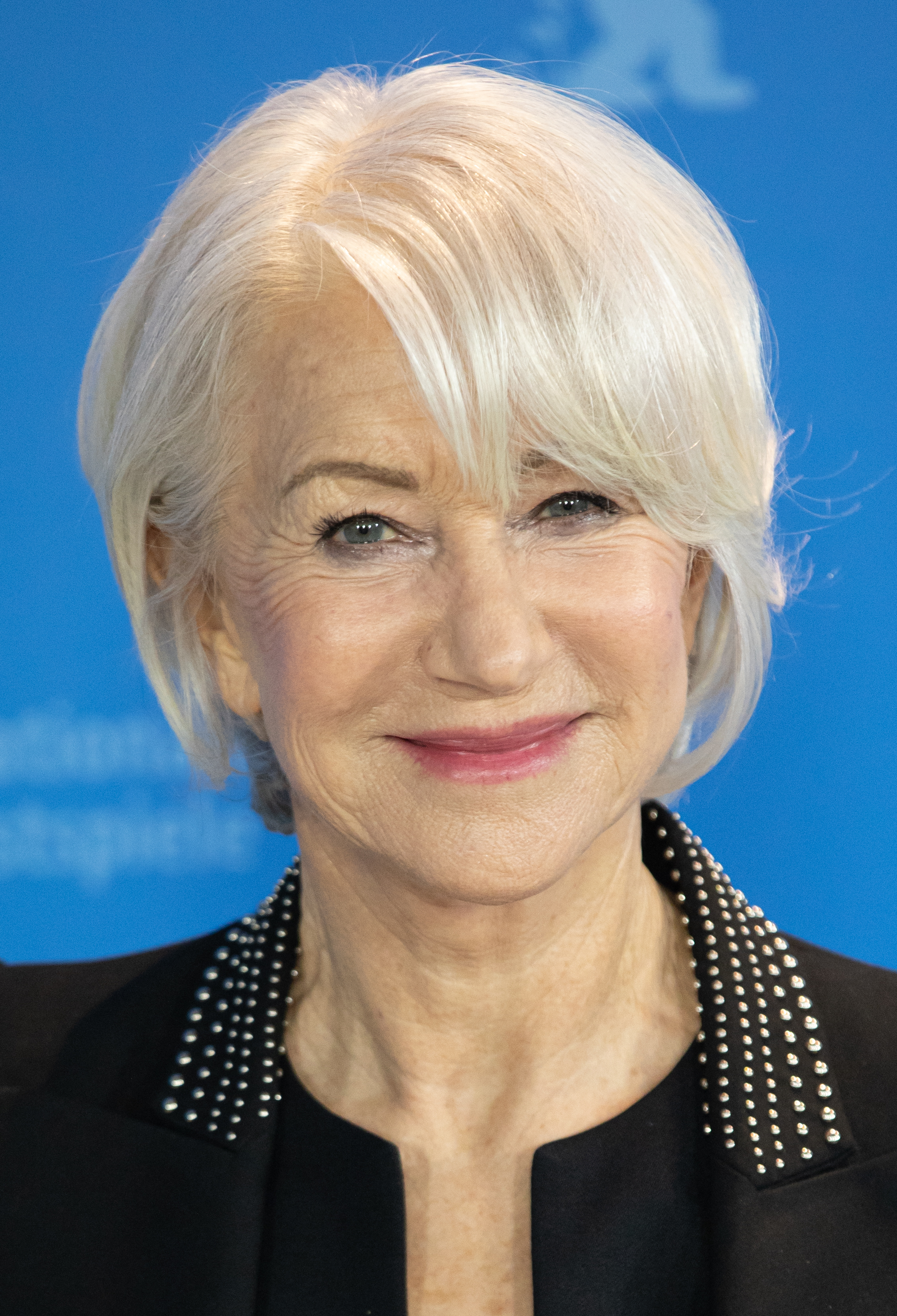
Helen Mirren won for The Audience (2013)

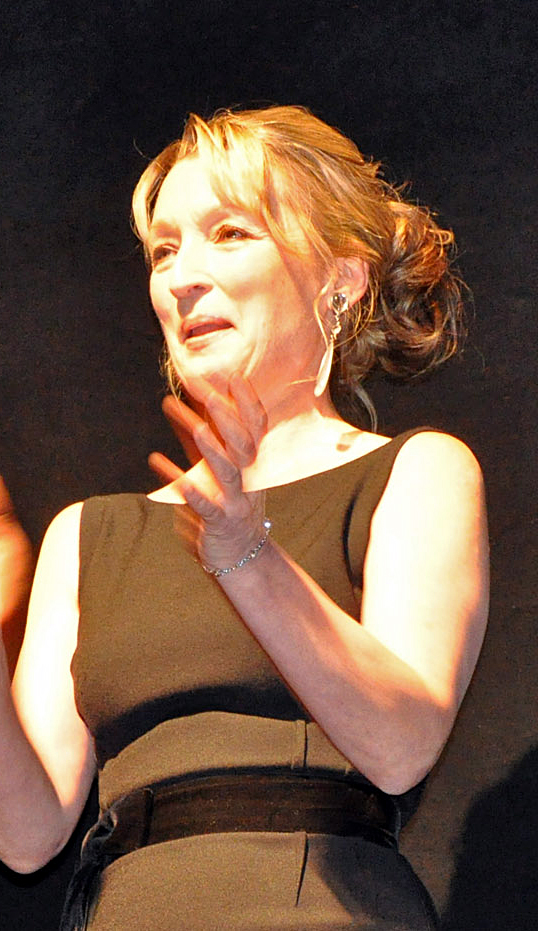
Lesley Manville Ghosts (2014), Oedipus (2025)

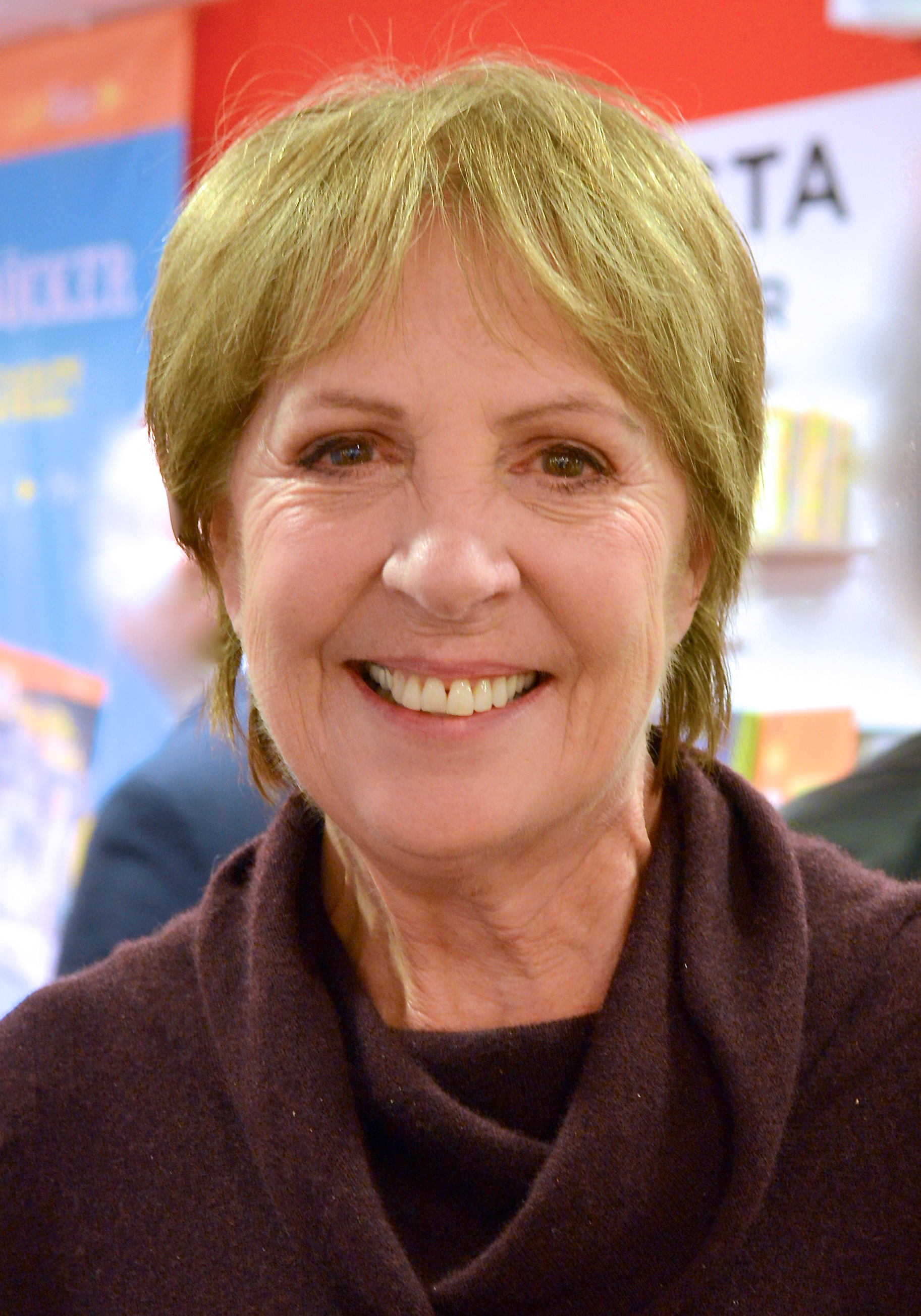
Penelope Wilton won for Taken at Midnight (2015)

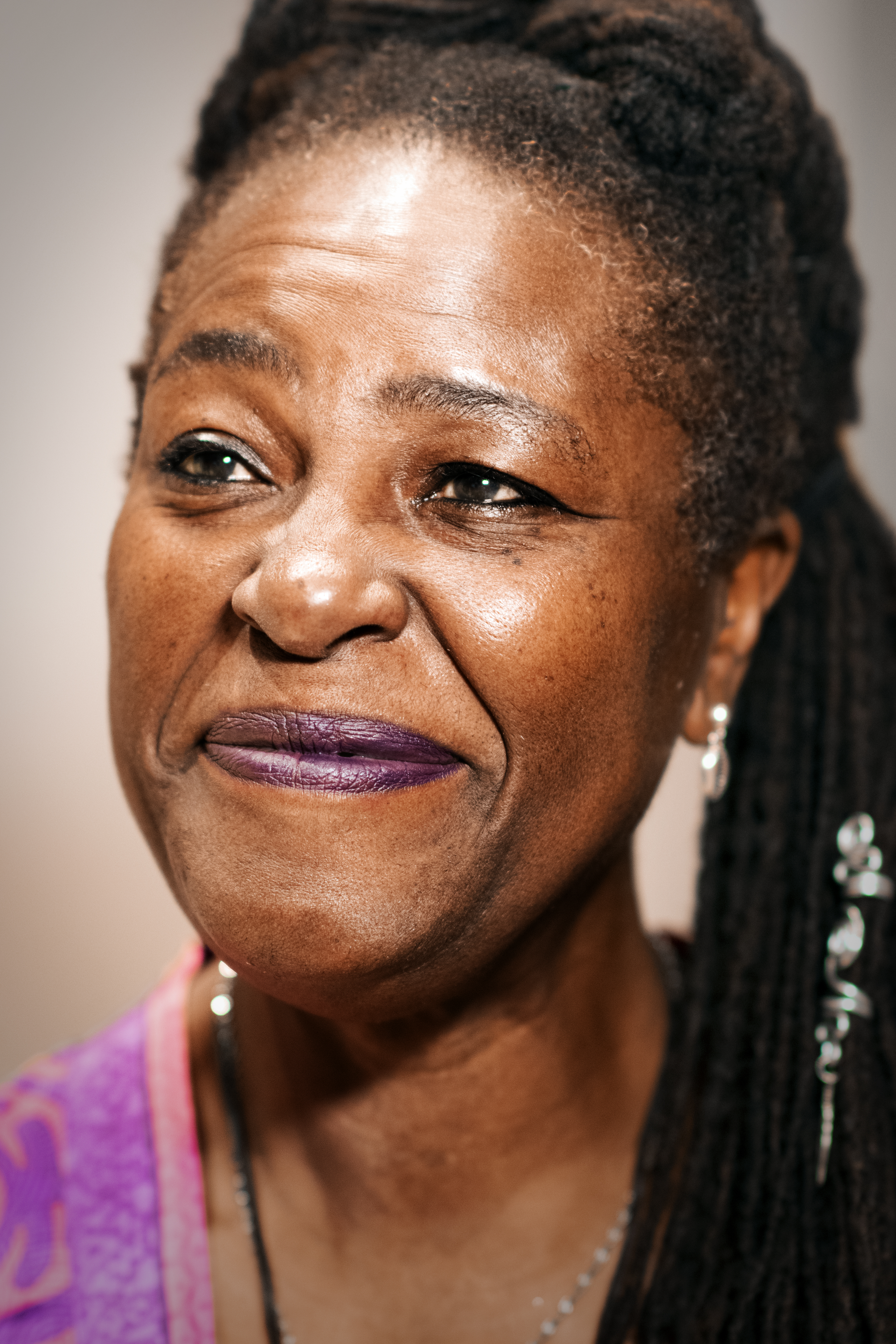
Sharon D. Clarke won for Death of a Salesman (2020)

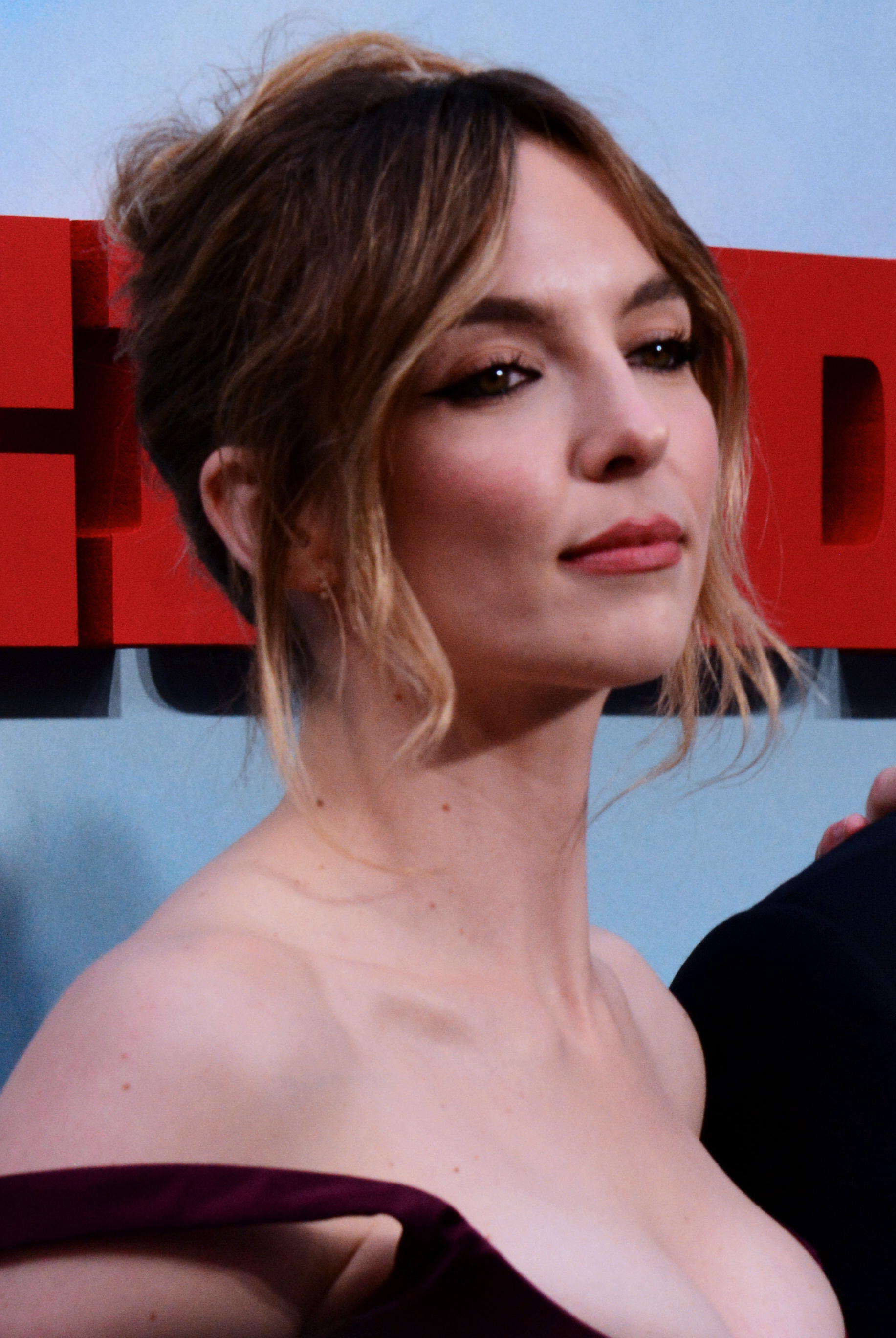
Jodie Comer won for Prima Facie (2023)

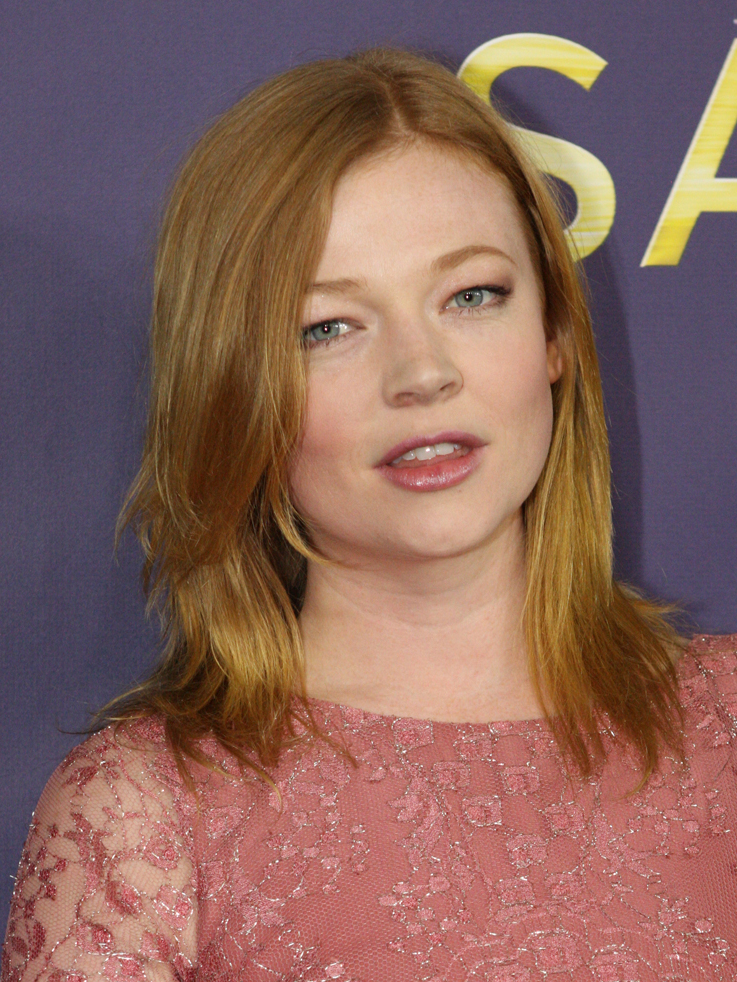
Sarah Snook won for The Portrait of Dorian Gray (2024)

=== 1980s ===
Year	Actor	Play	Character
1985
1985	Yvonne Bryceland	The Road to Mecca	Miss Helen
1985	Wendy Morgan	Martine	Martine
1985	Harriet Walter	The Castle	Skinner
1985	Joanne Whalley	Saved	Pam
1986
1986	Lindsay Duncan	Les Liaisons Dangereuses	Marquise de Merteuil
1986	Julia McKenzie	Woman in Mind	Susan
1986	Juliet Stevenson	As You Like It, Les Liaisons Dangereuses and Troilus and Cressida	Rosalind / Madame de Tourvel / Cressida
1986	Irene Worth	The Bay at Nice	Valentina Nrovka
1987
1987	Judi Dench	Antony and Cleopatra	Cleopatra
1987	Miranda Richardson	A Lie of the Mind	Beth
1987	Maggie Smith	Lettice and Lovage and Coming in to Land	Lettice Douffet / Halina
1987	Juliet Stevenson	Yerma	Yerma
1989/90
1989/90	Fiona Shaw	Electra, As You Like It and The Good Person of Szechwan	Electra / Celia / Shen Te
1989/90	Sheila Hancock	Prin	Prin
1989/90	Jane Lapotaire	Shadowlands	Joy
1989/90	Prunella Scales	Single Spies	Elizabeth II

=== 1990s ===
Year	Actor	Play	Character
1991
1991	Kathryn Hunter	The Visit	Claire Zachanassian
1991	Penny Downie	Scenes from a Marriage	Marianne
1991	Barbara Jefford	Coriolanus	Volumnia
1991	Josette Simon	After the Fall	Maggie
1992
1992	Juliet Stevenson	Death and the Maiden	Paulina
1992	Janet McTeer	Uncle Vanya	Yelena
1992	Patricia Routledge	Talking Heads	Miss Schofield
1992	Fiona Shaw	Hedda Gabler	Hedda Gabler Tesman
1993
1993	Alison Steadman	The Rise and Fall of Little Voice	Mari
1993	Stockard Channing	Six Degrees of Separation	Ouisa Kittredge
1993	Judi Dench	The Gift of the Gorgon	Helen
1993	Jane Horrocks	The Rise and Fall of Little Voice	Little Voice
1994
1994	Fiona Shaw	Machinal	Young Woman
1994	Kathryn Hunter	The Skriker	Skriker
1994	Diana Rigg	Medea	Medea
1994	Penelope Wilton	The Deep Blue Sea	Hester Collyer
1995
1995	Clare Higgins	Sweet Bird of Youth	Alexandra Del Lago
1995	Frances de la Tour	Les Parents terribles	Leo
1995	Sheila Gish	Les Parents terribles	Yvonne
1995	Margot Leicester	Broken Glass	Sylvia Gellburg
1996
1996	Judi Dench	Absolute Hell	Christine Foskett
1996	Diana Rigg	Mother Courage	Mother Courage
1996	Zoë Wanamaker	The Glass Menagerie	Amanda Wingfield
1996	Lia Williams	Skylight	Kyra Hollis
1997
1997	Janet McTeer	A Doll's House	Nora Helmer
1997	Eileen Atkins	John Gabriel Borkman	Mrs. Gunhild Borkman
1997	Vanessa Redgrave	John Gabriel Borkman	Ella Rentheim
1997	Diana Rigg	Who's Afraid of Virginia Woolf?	Martha
1998
1998	Zoë Wanamaker	Electra	Electra
1998	Judi Dench	Amy's View	Esme Allen
1998	Sally Dexter	Closer	Anna
1998	Maggie Smith	A Delicate Balance	Claire
1999
1999	Eileen Atkins	The Unexpected Man	Woman
1999	Sinéad Cusack	Our Lady of Sligo	Mai O'Hara
1999	Judi Dench	Filumena Marturano	Filumena
1999	Nicole Kidman	The Blue Room	Various Characters
1999	Diana Rigg	Britannicus and Phèdre	Agrippina / Phaedra

=== 2000s ===
Year	Actor	Play	Character
2000
2000	Janie Dee	Comic Potential	Jacie Triplethree
2000	Jennifer Ehle	The Real Thing	Annie
2000	Maggie Smith	The Lady in the Van	Miss Shepherd
2000	Alison Steadman	The Memory of Water	Teresa
2001
2001	Julie Walters	All My Sons	Kate Keller
2001	Jessica Lange	Long Day's Journey Into Night	Mary Tyrone
2001	Helen Mirren	Orpheus Descending	Lady Torrance
2001	Julia Ormond	My Zinc Bed	Elsa
2001	Harriet Walter	Life x 3	Sonia
2002
2002	Lindsay Duncan	Private Lives	Amanda Prynne
2002	Lindsay Duncan	Mouth to Mouth	Laura
2002	Victoria Hamilton	A Day in the Death of Joe Egg	Sheila
2002	Zoë Wanamaker	Boston Marriage	Anna
2003
2003	Clare Higgins	Vincent in Brixton	Ursula Loyer
2003	Anita Dobson	Frozen	Nancy
2003	Gwyneth Paltrow	Proof	Catherine
2003	Emily Watson	Uncle Vanya	Sonya
2004
2004	Eileen Atkins	Honour	Honor
2004	Helen Mirren	Mourning Becomes Electra	Christine Mannon
2004	Ann Mitchell	Through the Leaves	Martha
2004	Kelly Reilly	After Miss Julie	Miss Julie
2004	Kristin Scott Thomas	Three Sisters	Masha
2005
2005	Clare Higgins	Hecuba	Hecuba
2005	Victoria Hamilton	Suddenly, Last Summer	Catharine
2005	Anna Maxwell Martin	His Dark Materials	Lyra
2005	Caroline O'Connor	Bombshells	Performer
2006
2006	Eve Best	Hedda Gabler	Hedda Gabler Tesman
2006	Clare Higgins	Death of a Salesman	Linda Loman
2006	Helen McCrory	As You Like It	Rosalind
2006	Janet McTeer	Mary Stuart	Mary, Queen of Scots
2006	Harriet Walter	Mary Stuart	Elizabeth I of England
2007
2007	Tamsin Greig	Much Ado About Nothing	Beatrice
2007	Eve Best	A Moon for the Misbegotten	Josie
2007	Sinéad Cusack	Rock 'n' Roll	Eleanor / Esme
2007	Kathleen Turner	Who's Afraid of Virginia Woolf?	Martha
2008
2008	Kristin Scott Thomas	The Seagull	Arkadina
2008	Anne-Marie Duff	Saint Joan	Joan of Arc
2008	Kelly Reilly	Othello	Desdemona
2008	Fiona Shaw	Happy Days	Winnie
2008	Penelope Wilton	John Gabriel Borkman	Ella Rentheim
2009
2009	Margaret Tyzack	The Chalk Garden	Mrs St. Maugham
2009	Deanna Dunagan	August: Osage County	Violet Weston
2009	Lindsay Duncan	That Face	Martha
2009	Penelope Wilton	The Chalk Garden	Miss Madrigal

=== 2010s ===
Year	Actor	Play	Character
2010
2010	Rachel Weisz	A Streetcar Named Desire	Blanche DuBois
2010	Gillian Anderson	A Doll's House	Nora Helmer
2010	Lorraine Burroughs	The Mountaintop	Camae
2010	Imelda Staunton	Entertaining Mr Sloane	Kath
2010	Juliet Stevenson	Duet for One	Stephanie Anderson
2011
2011	Nancy Carroll	After the Dance	Joan
2011	Tracie Bennett	End of the Rainbow	Judy Garland
2011	Tamsin Greig	The Little Dog Laughed	Diane
2011	Sophie Thompson	Clybourne Park	Bev
2012
2012	Ruth Wilson	Anna Christie	Anna Christie
2012	Celia Imrie	Noises Off	Dotty Otley
2012	Lesley Manville	Grief	Dorothy
2012	Kristin Scott Thomas	Betrayal	Emma
2012	Marcia Warren	The Ladykillers	Mrs Wilberforce
2013
2013	Helen Mirren	The Audience	Queen Elizabeth II
2013	Hattie Morahan	A Doll's House	Nora Helmer
2013	Billie Piper	The Effect	Connie
2013	Kristin Scott Thomas	Old Times	Kate / Anna
2014
2014	Lesley Manville	Ghosts	Mrs. Helene Alving
2014	Hayley Atwell	The Pride	Sylvia
2014	Anna Chancellor	Private Lives	Amanda Prynne
2014	Judi Dench	Peter and Alice	Alice Liddell
2015
2015	Penelope Wilton	Taken at Midnight	Irmgard Litten
2015	Gillian Anderson	A Streetcar Named Desire	Blanche DuBois
2015	Kristin Scott Thomas	Electra	Electra
2015	Imelda Staunton	Good People	Margie Walsh
2016
2016	Denise Gough	People, Places and Things	Emma
2016	Gemma Arterton	Nell Gwynn	Nell Gwynn
2016	Nicole Kidman	Photograph 51	Rosalind Franklin
2016	Janet McTeer	Les Liaisons dangereuses	Marquise de Merteuil
2016	Lia Williams	Oresteia	Clytemnestra
2017
2017	Billie Piper	Yerma	Yerma
2017	Glenda Jackson	King Lear	King Lear
2017	Cherry Jones	The Glass Menagerie	Amanda Wingfield
2017	Ruth Wilson	Hedda Gabler	Hedda Gabler Tesman
2018
2018	Laura Donnelly	The Ferryman	Caitlin Carney
2018	Lesley Manville	Long Day's Journey into Night	Mary Tyrone
2018	Audra McDonald	Lady Day at Emerson's Bar and Grill	Billie Holiday
2018	Imelda Staunton	Who's Afraid of Virginia Woolf?	Martha
2019
2019	Patsy Ferran	Summer and Smoke	Alma Winemiller
2019	Gillian Anderson	All About Eve	Margo Channing
2019	Eileen Atkins	The Height of the Storm	Madeleine
2019	Sophie Okonedo	Antony and Cleopatra	Cleopatra
2019	Katherine Parkinson	Home, I'm Darling	Judy

=== 2020s ===
Year	Actor	Play	Character
2020
2020	Sharon D. Clarke	Death of a Salesman	Linda Loman
2020	Hayley Atwell	Rosmersholm	Rebecca West
2020	Juliet Stevenson	The Doctor	The Doctor
2020	Phoebe Waller-Bridge	Fleabag	Fleabag
2021	Not presented due to extended closing of theatre productions during COVID-19 pandemic (Note: Due to late March 2020 to late July 2021 closing of London theatre productions during the COVID-19 pandemic in England, the 2022 awards recognise productions that launched anytime from February 2020 to February 2022)		
2022
2022	Sheila Atim	Constellations	Marianne
2022	Lily Allen	2:22 A Ghost Story	Jenny
2022	Emma Corrin	Anna X	Anna
2022	Cush Jumbo	Hamlet	Hamlet
2023
2023	Jodie Comer	Prima Facie	Tessa
2023	Patsy Ferran	A Streetcar Named Desire	Blanche DuBois
2023	Mei Mac	My Neighbour Totoro	Mei
2023	Janet McTeer	Phaedra (new version by Simon Stone)	Helen
2023	Nicola Walker	The Corn Is Green	Miss Moffat
2024
2024	Sarah Snook	The Picture of Dorian Gray	Performer / Various
2024	Laura Donnelly	The Hills of California	Veronica / Joan
2024	Sophie Okonedo	Medea	Medea
2024	Sarah Jessica Parker	Plaza Suite	Karen Nash / Muriel Tate / Norma Hubley
2024	Sheridan Smith	Shirley Valentine	Shirley Valentine
2025
2025	Lesley Manville	Oedipus	Jocasta
2025	Heather Agyepong	Shifters	Des
2025	Rosie Sheehy	Machinal	Young Woman
2025	Meera Syal	A Tupperware of Ashes	Queenie
2025	Indira Varma	Oedipus	Jocasta
2026
2026	Rosamund Pike	Inter Alia	Jessica Parks
2026	Cate Blanchett	The Seagull	Irina Arkádina
2026	Marianne Jean-Baptiste	All My Sons	Kate Keller
2026	Julia McDermott	Weather Girl	Stacey
2026	Rosie Sheehy	Guess How Much I Love You?	Her

== Multiple awards and nominations for Best Actress ==
=== Awards ===
Three Awards

- Claire Higgins

Two Awards

- Judi Dench
- Fiona Shaw
- Eileen Atkins
- Lesley Manville

=== Nominations ===
Six Nominations

- Judi Dench

Five Nominations

- Kristin Scott Thomas
- Juliet Stevenson
- Janet McTeer

Four Nominations

- Fiona Shaw
- Eileen Atkins
- Lesley Manville
- Penelope Wilton
- Diana Rigg

Three Nominations

- Zoë Wanamaker
- Helen Mirren
- Maggie Smith
- Harriet Walter
- Imelda Staunton
- Gillian Anderson

Two Nominations

- Kathryn Hunter
- Alison Steadman
- Lindsay Duncan
- Eve Best
- Tamsin Greig
- Billie Piper
- Patsy Ferran
- Laura Donnelly
- Sophie Okonedo
- Victoria Hamilton
- Sinéad Cusack
- Kelly Reilly
- Nicole Kidman
- Lia Williams
- Hayley Atwell
- Rosie Sheehy

== See also ==
- Best Actress
- Critics' Circle Theatre Award for Best Actress
- Drama Desk Award for Outstanding Actress in a Play
- Evening Standard Theatre Award for Best Actress
- Lists of acting awards
- Tony Award for Best Actress in a Play
