= Laurence Olivier Award for Outstanding Achievement in a Musical =

Retired award for London theatre

- Awarded for: Outstanding Achievement in a Musical
- Location: England
- Presented by: Society of London Theatre
- First award: 1981
- Final award: 1984
- Website: officiallondontheatre.com/olivier-awards/

The Laurence Olivier Award for Outstanding Achievement in a Musical was an annual award presented by the Society of London Theatre in recognition of the "world-class status of London theatre." The awards were established as the Society of West End Theatre Awards in 1976, and renamed in 1984 in honour of English actor and director Laurence Olivier.

This award was introduced in 1981, was also presented in 1982 and 1984, then was retired.

== Winners and nominees ==
=== 1980s ===
Year	Recipient	Production	Contribution
1981
1981	Gillian Lynne	Cats	Choreography
1981	Vernel Bagneris	One Mo' Time	Writing and Direction
1981	Joe Layton	Barnum	The Staging
1981	—N/a	The Mitford Girls	The Style and Design
1982
1982	—N/a	Guys and Dolls	—N/a
1982	—N/a	The Pirates of Penzance	—N/a
1982	—N/a	Song and Dance	—N/a
1982	—N/a	The Beggar's Opera	—N/a
1984
1984	Ned Sherrin	The Ratepayers' Iolanthe	Show Conception
1984	Howard Goodall	The Hired Man	The Music
1984	John Napier	Starlight Express	Show Design
1984	Trevor Nunn	Starlight Express	Overall Impact of the Production

== See also ==
- Drama Desk Award for Unique Theatrical Experience
- Tony Honors for Excellence in Theatre
