= 1981 Laurence Olivier Awards =

Edition of London theatre awards

1981 Society of West End Theatre Awards

The 1981 Society of West End Theatre Awards were held in 1981 in London celebrating excellence in West End theatre by the Society of West End Theatre. The awards would not become the Laurence Olivier Awards, as they are known today, until the 1984 ceremony.

== Winners and nominees ==
Details of winners (in bold) and nominees, in each award category, per the Society of London Theatre.

Play of the Year	Musical of the Year
**Children of a Lesser God by Mark Medoff – Albery**; Passion Play by Peter Nichols – RSC at the Aldwych; Translations by Brian Friel – National Theatre Lyttelton; Quartermaine's Terms by Simon Gray – Queen's	**Cats – New London**; Barnum – London Palladium; One Mo' Time – Cambridge; The Best Little Whorehouse in Texas – Theatre Royal Drury Lane
Comedy of the Year
**Steaming by Nell Dunn – Comedy**; Anyone for Denis by John Wells – Whitehall; Can't Pay? Won't Pay! by Dario Fo – Criterion; On the Razzle by Tom Stoppard – National Theatre Lyttelton
Actor of the Year in a New Play	Actress of the Year in a New Play
**Trevor Eve as James Leeds in Children of a Lesser God – Albery**; Edward Fox as St. John Quartermaine in Quartermaine's Terms – Queen's; James Grout as Henry Windscape in Quartermaine's Terms – Queen's; Karl Johnson in Television Times – RSC at the Warehouse	**Elizabeth Quinn as Sarah Norman in Children of a Lesser God – Albery**; Eileen Atkins as Nell in Passion Play – RSC at the Aldwych; Janet Dale as May in The Accrington Pals – RSC at the Warehouse; Maggie Smith as Virginia Woolf in Virginia – Theatre Royal Haymarket
Actor of the Year in a Revival	Actress of the Year in a Revival
**Daniel Massey as Jack Tanner in Man and Superman – National Theatre Olivier**; Warren Mitchell as Davies in The Caretaker – National Theatre Lyttelton; David Suchet as Shylock in The Merchant of Venice – RSC at the Aldwych; John Wood as Sir John Brute in The Provoked Wife – National Theatre Lyttelton	**Margaret Tyzack as Martha in Who's Afraid of Virginia Woolf – National Theatre Lyttelton**; Sinéad Cusack as Evadne in The Maid's Tragedy – RSC at the Warehouse; Rosemary Harris as Kate Keller in All My Sons – Wyndham's; Penelope Wilton as Ann Whitefield in Man and Superman – National Theatre Olivier
Actor of the Year in a Musical	Actress of the Year in a Musical
**Michael Crawford as P. T. Barnum in Barnum – London Palladium**; Brian Blessed as Old Deuteronomy in Cats – New London; Henderson Forsythe as Sheriff Ed Earl Dodd in The Best Little Whorehouse in Texas – Theatre Royal Drury Lane; Wayne Sleep as Mr. Mistoffolees in Cats – New London	**Carlin Glynn as Mona Stangley in The Best Little Whorehouse in Texas – Theatre Royal Drury Lane**; Petula Clark as Maria von Trapp in The Sound of Music – Apollo Victoria; Patricia Hodge as Nancy Mitford in The Mitford Girls – Globe; Sylvia Kumba Williams as Big Bertha Williams in One Mo' Time – Cambridge
Comedy Performance of the Year
**Rowan Atkinson as Himself in Rowan Atkinson in Revue – Globe**; Georgina Hale as Josie in Steaming – Comedy; Donald Sinden as Garry Essendine in Present Laughter – Vaudeville; Angela Thorne as Margaret Thatcher in Anyone for Denis – Whitehall
Actor of the Year in a Supporting Role	Actress of the Year in a Supporting Role
**Joe Melia as Maurice in Good – RSC at the Warehouse**; Tony Church as Polonius in Hamlet – RSC at the Aldwych; Norman Rodway as Seuman Shields in The Shadow of a Gunman – RSC at the Warehouse; Tom Wilkinson as Horatio in Hamlet – RSC at the Aldwych	**Gwen Watford as Monica Reed in Present Laughter – Vaudeville**; Brenda Bruce as Nurse in Romeo and Juliet – RSC at the Aldwych; Sinéad Cusack as Celia in As You Like It – RSC at the Aldwych; Gwen Taylor as Queen Gertrude in Hamlet – Ambassadors
Most Promising Newcomer of the Year in Theatre
**Alice Krige as Raina Petkoff in Arms and the Man – Lyric**; Catherine Hall as Gemma in Naked Robots – RSC at the Warehouse; Jeremy Nicholas for writing and performing as Various in Three Men in a Boat – Mayfair; Eric Peterson as Billy Bishop in Billy Bishop Goes to War – Comedy
Director of the Year
**Peter Wood for On the Razzle – National Theatre Lyttelton**; Donald McWhinnie for Translations – National Theatre Lyttelton; Trevor Nunn for Cats – New London; Harold Pinter for Quartermaine's Terms – Queen's
Designer of the Year
**Carl Toms for The Provoked Wife – National Theatre Lyttelton**; Eileen Diss for Measure for Measure – National Theatre Lyttelton; John Napier for Cats – New London; Saul Radomsky for Tonight at 8.30 – Lyric
Outstanding Achievement of the Year in a Musical
**Gillian Lynne for choreographing Cats – New London**; Vernel Bagneris for directing and writing One Mo' Time – Cambridge; The staging of Barnum – London Palladium; The style and design of The Mitford Girls – Globe
Outstanding Achievement of the Year in Ballet	Outstanding First Achievement of the Year in Ballet
**Forgotten Land, Stuttgart Ballet – London Coliseum**; Dances of Albion, The Royal Ballet – Royal Opera House; Death and the Maiden, London Contemporary Dance Theatre – Sadler's Wells; Night Moves, The Royal Ballet – Sadler's Wells	**Bryony Brind in Dances of Albion, The Royal Ballet – Royal Opera House**; Stephen Beagley for work in new productions, The Royal Ballet – Royal Opera House; Michael Clark for work in new productions, Ballet Rambert – Sadler's Wells; Ashley Page in Isadora, The Royal Ballet – Royal Opera House
Outstanding Achievement in Opera	Outstanding First Achievement of the Year in Opera
**Les contes d'Hoffmann, The Royal Opera – Royal Opera House**; Die Frau ohne Schatten, Welsh National Opera – Dominion; Lulu, The Royal Opera – Royal Opera House; Samson et Delilah, The Royal Opera – Royal Opera House	**Ann Mackay in The Gypsy Princess – Sadler's Wells**; Helen Field in The Cunning Little Vixen – Dominion; Claire Powell in Les contes d'Hoffmann, The Royal Opera – Royal Opera House; David Wilson-Johnson in The Lighthouse – Sadler's Wells

== Productions with multiple nominations and awards ==
The following 18 productions, including one ballet and one opera, received multiple nominations:

- 6: Cats
- 3: Barnum, Children of a Lesser God, Hamlet, One Mo' Time and The Best Little Whorehouse in Texas
- 2: Anyone for Denis, Dances of Albion, Les contes d'Hoffmann, Man and Superman, On the Razzle, Passion Play, Present Laughter, Quartermaine's Terms, Steaming, The Mitford Girls, The Provoked Wife and Translations

The following two productions received multiple awards:

- 3: Children of a Lesser God
- 2: Cats

== See also ==
- 35th Tony Awards
