= Laurence Olivier Award for Actress of the Year in a New Play =

Retired award for London theatre

- Awarded for: Actress of the Year in a New Play
- Location: England
- Presented by: Society of London Theatre
- First award: 1976
- Final award: 1988
- Website: officiallondontheatre.com/olivier-awards/

The Laurence Olivier Award for Actress of the Year in a New Play was an annual award presented by the Society of London Theatre in recognition of the "world-class status of London theatre." The awards were established as the Society of West End Theatre Awards in 1976, and renamed in 1984 in honour of English actor and director Laurence Olivier.

This award was presented from 1976 to 1984, then in 1985 the award was combined with the Actress of the Year in a Revival award to create the Best Actress award. The original Actress of the Year in a New Play award returned one last time, for the 1988 ceremony.

== Winners and nominees ==
=== 1970s ===
Year	Actor	Play	Character
1976
1976	Peggy Ashcroft	Old World	Lidya Vasilyevna
1976	Pauline Collins	Engaged	Belinda Trehern
1976	Penelope Keith	Donkeys' Years	Lady Driver
1976	Joan Plowright	The Bed Before Yesterday	Alma
1977
1977	Alison Fiske	Dusa, Fish, Stats and Vi	Fish
1977	Glenda Jackson	Stevie	Stevie Smith
1977	Glynis Johns	Cause Célèbre	Alma
1977	Rosemary Leach	Just Between Ourselves	Vera
1978
1978	Joan Plowright	Filumena	Filumena Marturano
1978	Yvonne Bryceland	The Woman	Hecuba
1978	Sylvia Miles	Vieux Carré	Mrs. Wire
1978	Kate Nelligan	Plenty	Susan
1979
1979	Jane Lapotaire	Piaf	Édith Piaf
1979	Constance Cummings	Wings	Emily Stilson
1979	Gemma Jones	And a Nightingale Sang	Helen
1979	Jessica Tandy	The Gin Game	Fonsia Dorsey

=== 1980s ===
Year	Actor	Play	Character
1980
1980	Frances de la Tour	Duet for One	Stephanie
1980	Shelagh Holliday	A Lesson from Aloes	Gladys
1980	Glenda Jackson	Rose	Rose
1980	Joan Plowright	Enjoy	Connie Craven
1981
1981	Elizabeth Quinn	Children of a Lesser God	Sarah
1981	Eileen Atkins	Passion Play	Nell
1981	Janet Dale	The Accrington Pals	May
1981	Maggie Smith	Virginia	Virginia Woolf
1982
1982	Rosemary Leach	84, Charing Cross Road	Narrator
1982	Judy Davis	Insignificance	The Actress
1982	Judi Dench	Other Places	Deborah
1982	Anna Massey	Summer	Xenia
1983
1983	Judi Dench	Pack of Lies	Barbara Jackson
1983	Sara Kestelman	The Custom of the Country	Zenocia
1983	Maureen Lipman	Messiah	Rachel
1983	Janet Suzman	Cowardice	Nina
1984
1984	Thuli Dumakude	Poppie Nongena	Poppie
1984	Brenda Blethyn	Benefactors	Sheila
1984	Julie Covington	Tom & Viv	Vivienne Haigh-Wood Eliot
1984	Julie Walters	Fool for Love	May
1988
1988	Pauline Collins	Shirley Valentine	Shirley Valentine-Bradshaw
1988	Gillian Barge	Mrs. Klein	Melanie Klein
1988	Saskia Reeves	Separation	Sarah
1988	Penelope Wilton	The Secret Rapture	Marion French

== See also ==
- Best Actress
- Drama Desk Award for Outstanding Actress in a Play
- Lists of acting awards
- Tony Award for Best Actress in a Play
