= Rosie Sheehy =

Stage actress

Rosie Sheehy is a Welsh stage and screen actor, known for her work with the Royal Shakespeare Company, the Royal National Theatre, The Old Vic and for her critically acclaimed performances in London theatre. She performed in both classical and contemporary roles. Sheehy received a Laurence Olivier Award nomination for Best Actress twise for her performance as the Young Woman in Machinal at the Old Vic in 2024 and in Guess How Much I Love You? in 2025.

Sheehy was named a 2026 Screen International Star of Tomorrow.

== Early life and education ==
Sheehy was born and raised in Port Talbot, Wales, a community noted for its vibrant theatrical lineage and for nurturing several prominent performers. She has acknowledged the town's artistic identity as formative in her development as an actor. She later trained at the Royal Academy of Dramatic Art (RADA) in London.

== Career ==
=== Stage ===
Sheehy has performed extensively on stage with the Royal Shakespeare Company, the Royal National Theatre, and leading London theatres.

She made her London stage debut in The Hairy Ape (Old Vic), playing Mildred, directed by Richard Jones. She went on to appear in Uncle Vanya at Theatr Clwyd and Sheffield Theatre as Sonya, a performance that won the Best Female Performance in the English Language Award at the Wales Theatre Awards.

Other notable stage performances include:

- The Wolves (Theatre Royal Stratford East) — 13, directed by Ellen McDougall
- Bird (Manchester Royal Exchange) — Tash, directed by Rachel O’Riordan
- Anna X (The Vaults) — Anna, directed by Daniel Raggett
- Oleanna (Arts Theatre West End & Theatre Royal Bath) — Carol, directed by Lucy Bailey
- King John (Royal Shakespeare Company) — King John, directed by Eleanor Rhode
- All's Well That Ends Well (Royal Shakespeare Company) — Helena, directed by Blanche McIntyre, nominated for the Ian Charleson Awards 2023
- Richard III (Royal Shakespeare Company) — Lady Anne, directed by Greg Doran, nominated for the Ian Charleson Awards 2023
- A Midsummer Night's Dream (Royal Shakespeare Company) — Puck, directed by Eleanor Rhode
- Romeo and Julie (Royal National Theatre) — Julie, directed by Rachel O’Riordan, nominated for Breakthrough Artist, South Bank Sky Arts Awards 2023
- Machinal (Old Vic & Theatre Royal Bath) — Young Woman, directed by Richard Jones, nominated for Best Actress at the 2025 Olivier Awards
- An Interrogation (Hampstead Theatre / Celia Atkin) — Ruth Palmer, directed by Jamie Armitage
- The Brightening Air (Old Vic Theatre) — Billie, directed by Conor McPherson
- Guess How Much I Love You (Royal Court Theatre) - Woman, directed by Jeremy Herrin
- The Oresteia (Bridge Theatre) - Alice, directed by Simon Stone

== Reception ==
Critics have widely praised Sheehy's performance in Machinal. Time Out described her work as "astonishing," noting how she "nails a different aspect of alienation … her feral screams … become increasingly incapable of suppressing her disgust."

The Reviews Hub wrote: “Rosie Sheehy gives a towering central performance that will be talked about for decades.”

In The Guardian, Arifa Akbar wrote that she "cements her reputation as an astounding stage talent."

Reviewing the transfer to London, The Standard called her "gobsmacking," adding that "once in a while a … lead performance comes along which makes theatre history."

For The Brightening Air, critics again singled her out. Time Out described the play as "a bittersweet drama … Sheehy’s tough but intensely vulnerable Billie … it will be decades before the world is ready for her."

The Financial Times praised her as "outstanding as Billie, whose frankness makes her both vulnerable and insightful, and who is … the anchor of the play." The Standard noted: “Rosie Sheehy … adds to her unbroken run of transfixingly vivid roles … She gives the character … a twitchily unpredictable conviction.”

=== Awards and nominations ===
Year	Award	Category	Work	Result	Refs.
2025	Laurence Olivier Awards	Best Actress	Machinal	Nominated	
2026	Laurence Olivier Awards	Best Actress	Guess How Much I Love You?	Nominated	
