= Roza (musical) =

- Music: Gilbert Bécaud
- Lyrics: Julian More
- Book: Julian More
- Basis: The Life Before Us by Romain Gary
- Productions: 1987 Broadway

Roza is a 1987 musical based on the novel The Life Before Us by Romain Gary with music by Gilbert Bécaud and lyrics and book by Julian More.

== Background ==
Bécaud had seen Sweeney Todd: The Demon Barber of Fleet Street and was inspired to work with Harold Prince, who directed the 1979 Stephen Sondheim musical. He wanted to adapt the novel The Life Before Us by Romain Gary into a musical, which was also made into a movie Madame Rosa starring Simone Signoret (1977), but Prince declined. Prince stated that he hated the movie and thought it was "sentimental and negative". Becaud was determined to convince Prince, and Prince eventually agreed on one condition: that he be able to choose the librettist who would also write the lyrics. Prince ended up choosing Julian More.

Prince suggested to More that the setting of the show jump between past and present, but it was "...clear that it was pretentious." They decided to tell the story in the present.

Before going to Broadway, the show was workshopped at both the Centerstage in Baltimore, Maryland, and the Mark Taper Forum in Los Angeles. Even though Prince felt it was not strong enough to go to Broadway, he decided to mount a Broadway production. The people in the previous cities had liked the show, but Broadway did not, and the show closed in less than two weeks. Prince later stated that show might have lived on in regional theaters had it not gone to Broadway.

== Plot summary ==
The story follows Roza, a former prostitute, who now operates a temporary home for children of prostitutes until they can be adopted or reclaimed by their mothers.

== Songs ==
- Act I
  - Happiness—Madame Roza
  - Max's Visit—Max and Madame Roza
  - Different—Lola, Madame Roza, Madame Katz, Madame Bouaffa and Jasmine
  - Is Me—Young Momo, Young Moise, Salima, Michel, Banania, Madame Bouaffa and Jasmine
  - Get The Lady Dressed—Madame Roza, Lola, Young Momo, Young Moise, Salima, Michel and Banania
  - Hamil's Birthday—Company
  - Bravo Bravo—Madame Roza
  - Moon Like a Silver Window—Young Momo, Momo and Company
- Act II
  - Merci—Momo and Moise
  - House in Algiers—Madame Roza
  - Yussef's Visit—Yussef Kadir, Madame Roza, Momo, Moise and Lola
  - Life is Ahead of Me—Momo
  - Sweet Seventeen—Madame Bouaffa, Jasmine, Momo and Moise
  - Lola's Ceremony—Lola and Company
  - Don't Make Me Laugh—Madame Roza and Lola
  - Live a Little—Madame Roza
  - Finale—Company

== Productions ==
The 1987 Broadway production opened at the Royale Theatre and was directed by Harold Prince, with musical staging by Patricia Birch (Grease), scenic design by Alexander Okun, costume design by Florence Klotz (A Little Night Music), lighting design by Ken Billington, sound design by Otts Munderloh, hair by Phyllis Della Illien, musical direction and dance and vocal arrangements by Louis St. Louis, and music orchestration by Michael Gibson (Hair, film version "Grease"). The band consisted of Ted Sperling (Synthesizers), Luther Rix (Drums/Electronic Percussion), Stu Woods (Bass), Chuck D'Aloia (Guitars/Banjo), Jamey Haddad (Percussion/Hadgini Drums/Drum Machine/Sequencing), Joe Pisaro(Mallets/Percussion), Bill Drewes (Reeds), Ted Nash (Reeds), and Earl McIntyre (Trombone).

The production, which closed after just ten days, starred Georgia Brown as Roza, Bob Gunton as Lola, Max Loving as Young Momo, Alex Paez as Momo, Joey McKneely as Moise, and also featured Al De Cristo, Ira Hawkins, Jerry Matz, Marcia Lewis, Stephen Rosenberg, Richard Frisch, Michele Mais, Mandla Msomi, Thuli Dumakude, Monique Cintron, David Shoichi Chan, Yamil Borges, and Neal Ben-Ari. The standbys were Bob Frisch (Lola) and Chevi Colton (Madame Roza). Understudies were Ramon Del Barrio, Anny De Gange, Dennis Courtney and Francisco Paler-Large.
