= Harlequinade (Australian TV play) =

- Ad in The Age 20 Dec 1961
- Genre: comedy
- Based on: Harlequinade by Terence Rattigan
- Directed by: Bill Bain
- Country of origin: Australia
- Original language: English

Production
- Producer: Les Weldon
- Running time: 60 mins
- Production company: ABC

Original release
- Network: ABC
- Release: 20 December 1961

Harlequinade is a 1961 Australian TV play based on the Terence Rattigan play Harlequinade. It was directed by Bill Bain and aired on 20 December 1961 in Sydney, 7 February 1962 in Melbourne, and 29 May 1962 in Brisbane.

It was the first adaptation of Terence Rattigan on Australian television.

== Plot ==
A middle aged couple, Arthur and Edna are appearing in a stage production of Romeo and Juliet in a small town. They meet a woman who claims to be Arthur's daughter from his first marriage.

They realise they are too young to play star crossed lovers.

== Cast ==
- John Alden as Arthur Gosport
- Neva Carr Glyn as Edna Selby
- Owen Weingott as Fred Ingram
- Don Pascoe as Fred Wakefield
- Enid Lorimer as Dame Maud
- Cherrie Butlin as Joyce
- Lou Vernon
- Marcia Hathaway
- Martin Redpath
- Peter Stewart
- Frank Taylor
- Alan Tobin
- Hilary Linstead

== Production ==
It starred Cherrie Butlin who was the daughter of Billy Butlin; she had lived in Australia for three years. The set was designed by Philip Hickie.

== Reception ==
The Sydney Morning Herald called it "skittish and affectionate".
