= The Mitford Girls =

1981 British musical

The Mitford Girls is a musical by Caryl Brahms and Ned Sherrin with music by Peter Greenwell and others.

Devised for 'six beautiful actress singers, a leading man and four young male dancers', the musical is based on material from the Mitford sisters' lives and writings.

After a season at the Chichester Festival Theatre, it transferred to London at the West End's Globe Theatre from 8 October, 1981 to 9 January, 1982.

The original production was nominated for two 1981 Society of West End Theatre Awards, for Patricia Hodge as Actress of the Year in a Musical and Outstanding Achievement of the Year in a Musical for the style and design.

A London cast recording comprising 23 numbers was recorded in September 1981 and issued by Philips on one LP. The principals were Patricia Hodge (Nancy and Muv), Lucy Fenwick (Jessica), Julia Sutton (Pamela and nanny), Patricia Michael (Diana), Colette Gleeson (Unity), Gay Soper (Deborah) and Oz Clarke (Tom, Farve, Hamish, Peter Rodd, Esmond and the band singer); the musical director was John Owen Edwards who also played piano, and Hodge was credited with playing ukelele.
