= Dennis Courtney =

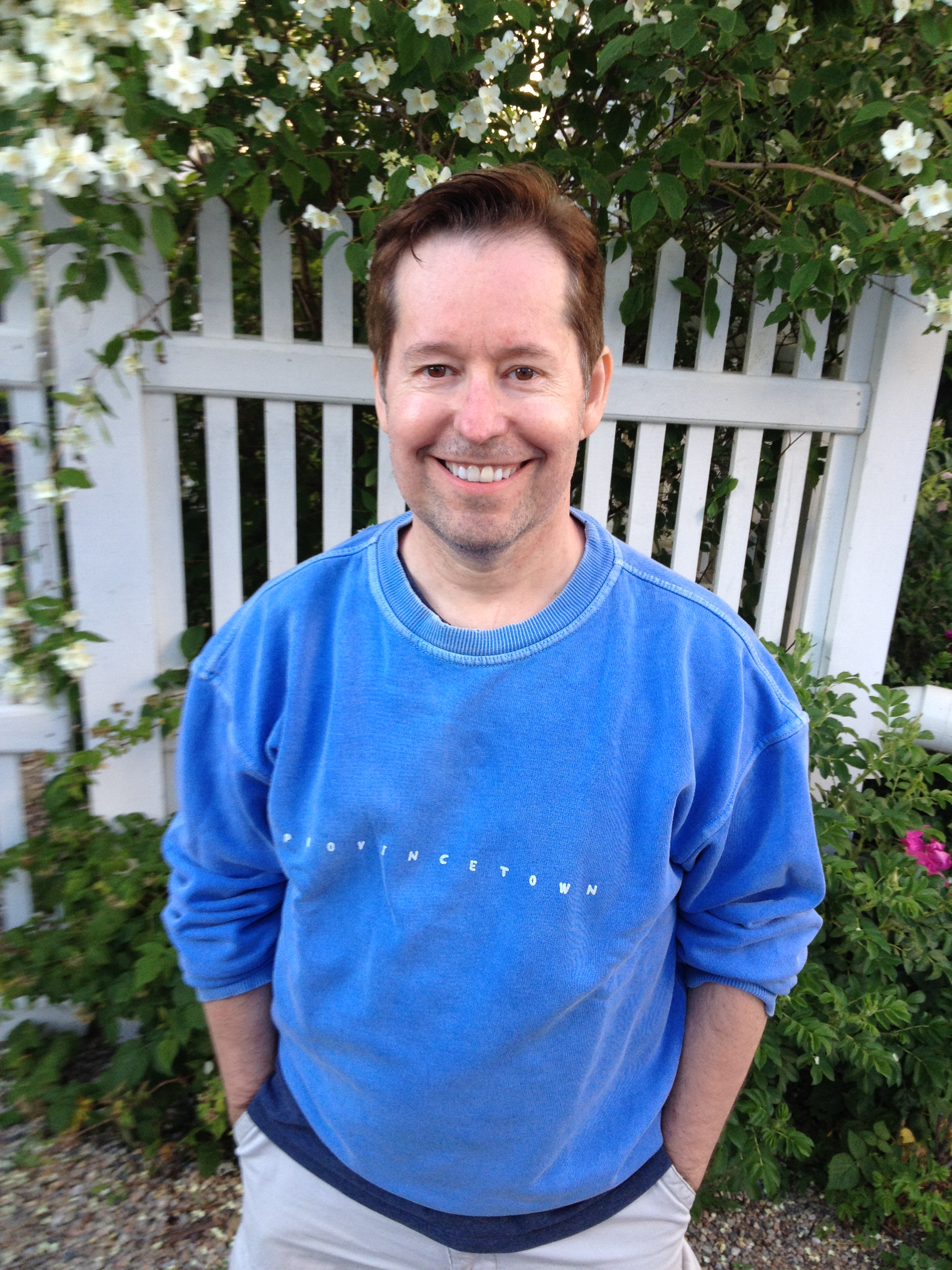
- Dennis Courtney in Provincetown in 2016
- Born: April 30, 1958 (age 68); Detroit, Michigan
- Occupations: Director, Choreographer, Actor, Audition Coach
- Years active: 1977-present
- Spouse: Grant Wheaton

Dennis H. Beaulne (born April 30, 1958), better known by his stage name Dennis Courtney, is an American stage director, choreographer, actor and teacher of master classes in auditioning for the theatre. As a director, he is notable for winning the 2008 Israeli National Theatre Prize for his work in the Cameri Theatre production of Fiddler On The Roof, in Tel Aviv. The production closed on January 27, 2016 after a near 8-year run. As an actor, he made his Broadway debut in the 1979 production of Peter Pan with Sandy Duncan and George Rose. Subsequent Broadway/National Tour/Production credits include Shenandoah with John Raitt (1984), Joseph And The Amazing Technicolor Dreamcoat (1984), Roza (1987) and Starlight Express (1989-1990). He directed and choreographed a production of My Way, for the Riverside Center Theatre in Virginia and It Shoulda Been You starring Kim Zimmer and 8 Track: The Sounds of the 70's for Gretna Theatre in July and August 2016. In early 2017.In March 2017 he directed the pre-Broadway workshop production of The Last Adam, a new musical by George Alex Livings and Jonathan Hickey. He has collaborated with playwright David Brian Colbert on a new play with music about the life of legendary performer, Ethel Waters, entitled Still Waters: The Life of the Legendary Ethel Waters.

== Personal life ==
Born Denis Beaulne in Detroit, Michigan to French Canadian parents, Albert Beaulne and Claudette Perron. He took the stage name Dennis Courtney with his first union acting job in 1978.

He graduated from Anderson High School in Cincinnati, Ohio and studied theatre at the University of Cincinnati. He currently resides in New York City and has homes in Sarasota, Florida and Palm Desert, California.
