= Best Actress =

Award presented by various organisations to leading actresses

Best Actress is the name of an award which is presented by various film, television and theatre organisations, festivals, and people's awards to leading actresses in a film, television series, television film or play. The first Best Actress award was awarded for acting in a film, on May 16, 1929 by the Academy of Motion Picture Arts and Sciences (AMPAS) at the Academy Awards to Janet Gaynor for her role of Diane in 7th Heaven, Angela in Street Angel and The Wife - Indre in Sunrise: A Song of Two Humans. In theatre, it was first awarded on April 6, 1947 by the American Theatre Wing and The Broadway League at the Tony Awards to Ingrid Bergman for her role of Mary Grey / Joan of Arc in Joan of Lorraine and to Helen Hayes for her role of Addie in Happy Birthday. In television, it was first awarded on January 23, 1951 by Academy of Television Arts & Sciences at the Primetime Emmy Awards to Gertrude Berg for her role of Molly in The Goldbergs. In a film festival, presented as the Volpi Cup, it was first awarded between August 1–20, 1934 by the Venice Film Festival to Katharine Hepburn for her role of Josephine 'Jo' March in Little Women.

== Film awards ==
- AACTA Award for Best Actress in a Leading Role
- AACTA International Award for Best Actress
- Academy Award for Best Actress
- Angel Film Awards - Monaco International Film Festival
- Annecy Italian Film Festival Best Actress Award
- Ariel Award for Best Actress
- Asian Film Award for Best Actress
- Asianet Film Award for Best Actress
- BAFTA Award for Best Actress in a Leading Role
- Babisas Award for Best Actress
- Bachsas Award for Best Actress
- Bangladesh National Film Award for Best Actress
- Bavarian Film Awards (Best Acting)
- Bengal Film Journalists' Association – Best Actress Award
- BET Award for Best Actor & Actress
- BIFA for Best Performance by an Actress in a British Independent Film
- Black Reel Award for Best Actress
- Bodil Award for Best Actress in a Leading Role
- Bollywood Movie Award – Best Actress
- Boston Society of Film Critics Award for Best Actress
- Canadian Screen Award for Best Actress
- Cannes Film Festival Best Actress Award
- César Award for Best Actress
- Chicago Film Critics Association Award for Best Actress
- CineMAA Award for Best Actress
- Citra Award for Best Actress
- CJFB Performance Award for Best Actress
- Critics' Choice Movie Award for Best Actress
- Critics' Choice Movie Award for Best Actress in an Action Movie
- Critics' Choice Movie Award for Best Actress in a Comedy
- Crystal Simorgh for Best Actress
- Dallas–Fort Worth Film Critics Association Award for Best Actress
- David di Donatello for Best Actress
- Edda Award for Best Actor or Actress
- Empire Award for Best Actress
- Empire Award for Best British Actress
- European Film Award for Best Actress
- FAMAS Award for Best Actress
- Filmfare Award for Best Actress - Hindi
- Filmfare Award for Best Actress – Kannada
- Filmfare Award for Best Actress – Malayalam
- Filmfare Award for Best Actress – Tamil
- Filmfare Award for Best Actress – Telugu
- Florida Film Critics Circle Award for Best Actress
- Genie Award for Best Performance by a Foreign Actress
- GIFA Best Actress Award
- GIFA Critics Best Actress Award
- Golden Arena for Best Actress (Pula Film Festival)
- Golden Calf for Best Actress (Netherlands Film Festival)
- Golden Eagle Award for Best Actress (China)
- Golden Eagle Award for Best Actress (Russia)
- Golden Globe Award for Best Actress in a Motion Picture – Drama
- Golden Globe Award for Best Actress in a Motion Picture – Comedy or Musical
- Golden Goblet Award for Best Actress (Shanghai International Film Festival)
- Golden Horse Award for Best Leading Actress
- Golden Rooster Award for Best Actress
- Goya Award for Best Actress
- Goya Award for Best New Actress
- Guldbagge Award for Best Actress in a Leading Role
- Hong Kong Film Award for Best Actress
- Hundred Flowers Award for Best Actress
- IIFA Award for Best Actress
- Independent Spirit Award for Best Female Lead
- ITFA Best Actress Award
- ITFA Best New Actress Award
- Japan Academy Prize for Outstanding Performance by an Actress in a Leading Role
- Kerala State Film Award for Best Actress
- London Film Critics' Circle Award for Actress of the Year
- Los Angeles Film Critics Association Award for Best Actress
- Lumière Award for Best Actress
- Lux Style Award for Best Film Actress
- Meril Prothom Alo Award for Best Actress
- Nandi Award for Best Actress
- Nastro d'Argento for Best Actress
- National Board of Review Award for Best Actress
- National Film Award for Best Actress
- National Society of Film Critics Award for Best Actress
- NAACP Image Award for Outstanding Actress in a Motion Picture
- New York Film Critics Circle Award for Best Actress
- Online Film Critics Society Award for Best Actress
- Polish Academy Award for Best Actress
- Robert Award for Best Actress in a Leading Role
- San Diego Film Critics Society Award for Best Actress
- San Francisco Film Critics Circle Award for Best Actress
- Santosham Best Actress Award
- Sarasaviya Best Actress Award
- Satellite Award for Best Actress – Motion Picture
- Saturn Award for Best Actress
- Screen Actors Guild Award for Outstanding Performance by a Female Actor in a Leading Role
- Screen Award for Best Actress
- Screen Award for Best Actress (Critics)
- Screen Award for Best Actress (Popular Choice)
- Shanghai Film Critics Award for Best Actress
- SIIMA Award for Best Actress (Telugu)
- Silver Bear for Best Actress (Berlin International Film Festival)
- Silver Hugo Award for Best Actress (Chicago International Film Festival)
- Silver Shell for Best Actress (San Sebastián International Film Festival)
- St. Louis Gateway Film Critics Association Award for Best Actress
- Stardust Award for Best Actress
- Stardust Award for Best Actress in a Comedy or Romance
- Stardust Award for Best Actress in a Drama
- Stardust Award for Best Actress in a Thriller or Action
- Tamil Nadu State Film Award for Best Actress
- Tokyo International Film Festival Best Actress Award
- Toronto Film Critics Association Award for Best Actress
- Vancouver Film Critics Circle Award for Best Actress
- Vancouver Film Critics Circle Award for Best Actress in a Canadian Film
- Vietnam Film Festival Best Actress Award
- Vijay Award for Best Actress
- Volpi Cup (Venice Film Festival)
- Washington D.C. Area Film Critics Association Award for Best Actress
- Zee Cine Award for Best Actor – Female
- Zee Cine Critics Award for Best Actor – Female

== Television awards ==
- AACTA Award for Best Lead Actress in a Television Drama
- Golden Bell Award for Best Actress in a Miniseries or Television Film
- Golden Bell Award for Best Actress
- Black Reel Award for Best Actress: T.V. Movie/Cable
- British Academy Television Award for Best Actress
- British Soap Award for Best Actress
- Critics' Choice Television Award for Best Actress in a Comedy Series
- Critics' Choice Television Award for Best Actress in a Drama Series
- Critics' Choice Television Award for Best Actress in a Movie/Miniseries
- Daytime Emmy Award for Outstanding Lead Actress in a Drama Series
- Gemini Award for Best Performance by an Actress in a Continuing Leading Dramatic Role
- Golden Calf for Best Acting in a Television Drama (Pula Film Festival)
- Golden Globe Award for Best Actress – Miniseries or Television Film
- Golden Globe Award for Best Actress – Television Series Drama
- Golden Globe Award for Best Actress – Television Series Musical or Comedy
- Hum Award for Best Actress
- Hum Award for Best Actress Popular
- Lux Style Award for Best TV Actress
- NAACP Image Award for Outstanding Actress in a Daytime Drama Series
- NAACP Image Award for Outstanding Actress in a Drama Series
- NAACP Image Award for Outstanding Actress in a Television Movie, Mini-Series or Dramatic Special
- Primetime Emmy Award for Outstanding Lead Actress in a Comedy Series
- Primetime Emmy Award for Outstanding Lead Actress in a Drama Series
- Primetime Emmy Award for Outstanding Lead Actress in a Miniseries or a Movie
- Satellite Award for Best Actress – Miniseries or Television Film
- Satellite Award for Best Actress – Television Series Drama
- Satellite Award for Best Actress – Television Series Musical or Comedy
- Saturn Award for Best Actress on Television
- Screen Actors Guild Award for Outstanding Performance by a Female Actor in a Comedy Series
- Screen Actors Guild Award for Outstanding Performance by a Female Actor in a Drama Series
- Screen Actors Guild Award for Outstanding Performance by a Female Actor in a Miniseries or Television Movie
- Sun Kudumbam Best Actress Award
- TVB Anniversary Award for Best Actress

== Theatre awards ==
- Evening Standard Theatre Award for Best Actress
- Helpmann Award for Best Female Actor in a Musical
- Helpmann Award for Best Female Actor in a Play
- Helpmann Award for Best Female Performer in an Opera
- Laurence Olivier Award for Actress of the Year in a New Play
- Laurence Olivier Award for Actress of the Year in a Revival
- Laurence Olivier Award for Best Actress
- Laurence Olivier Award for Best Actress in a Musical
- Molière Award for Best Actress
- NAACP Theatre Award for Best Lead Female – Equity
- NAACP Theatre Award for Best Lead Female – Local
- Tony Award for Best Actress in a Play
- Tony Award for Best Actress in a Musical
