= Philip Hickie =

Australian set designer

Philip Hickie (1927–2012) was an Australian set designer who worked extensively on Australian theatre and television. He also worked in England.

He was one of the first two designers for ABC TV and head of division of design at The National Art School.

== Select credits ==
- Harlequinade (1961)
