= Ann Mackay =

English soprano

- Born: 21 March 1956 (age 69); London, England
- Occupation: Classical soprano

Ann Mackay (born 21 March 1956) is an English soprano.

== Biography ==
Ann Mackay was born in London, England. She studied at the Guildhall School of Music and Drama and with Elisabeth Schwarzkopf with whom she appeared at London's Wigmore Hall and elsewhere in Britain and Germany

Mackay was the recipient of numerous awards before and after attending the Guildhall School of Music and Drama, including Greater London Council's "Outstanding Musician 1979", the Haydn Memorial Award, and the National Federation of Music Societies Award for Young Concert Artists.

In 1981, Mackay won the Society of West End Theatre Award for Outstanding First Achievement in Opera (1981 Laurence Olivier Awards), presented to her by Joan Sutherland, for her portrayal of Stasi in The Gypsy Princess. In a similar year, she won the Concert Artists Guild of America Amcon Award, following which she gave her New York debut at Carnegie Hall and toured the United States.

Mackay is a frequent performer at venues and festivals across Europe (including the Aldeburgh Festival, Cheltenham Music Festival, Three Choirs Festival), America, and Australia (including performances at the Sydney Opera House). She has also performed with numerous orchestras including the Royal Philharmonic Orchestra, London Symphony Orchestra, Bournemouth Symphony Orchestra, BBC Symphony Orchestra, BBC Scottish Symphony Orchestra, English Chamber Orchestra, London Mozart Players, City of London Sinfonia, Royal Liverpool Philharmonic Orchestra and others. Moreover, she has performed regularly on BBC radio and television.

In 1983, Mackay played Rose Trelawny in BBC Radio 4's 1983 production of Julian Slade's musical play Trelawny. In 1988, Mackay starred in Sadler's Wells Opera Company's four-month West End run and UK tour of Noël Coward's Bitter Sweet (the first professional revival since its 1929 premiere). The following year, she sang in John Rutter's Requiem under the direction of the composer at the Three Choirs Festival in Hereford. In 1990, Mackay toured France, Italy, Spain, and the UK with the European Community Chamber Orchestra as their Guest Singer of the Year In 1992, the Worshipful Company of Musicians elected Mackay a John Clementi Fellow, one of their most prestigious awards for a "professional musician of outstanding ability" for her study of the music of George Frideric Handel. Her subsequent Handel performances in the roles of Bernedice, Parthenope and Alcina with the Cambridge Handel Opera Group in the 1990s won her critical acclaim.

In addition to her Handel performances, she is highly regarded for her singing of French repertoire and of Richard Strauss (The Daily Telegraph writing of her "naturally beautiful voice with an effortless top that made her an ideal interpreter of Strauss".) Mackay has worked with numerous artists in the field of classical music, including Willard White, Simon Rattle, Stephen Cleobury, Nicholas McGegan and Marisa Robles (who described Mackay's voice as "one of the purest, musical and lovely voices I ever heard".)

Many composers have written music specifically for Mackay including the English composer and pianist Jack Gibbons, whose songs have been premiered by Mackay.)

== Family ==
Ann Mackay has three daughters. Her eldest daughter is Hannah Mackay, the British television comedy producer of the BAFTA nominated series Peep Show, script editor of the Rose D'Or winning and BAFTA nominated series Toast of London, writer on BAFTA nominated CBBC sitcom Sadie J. and other shows.

== Recordings ==
Mackay has recorded for the RPO, Decca, Erato, ASV, Meridian, and other companies, including, for Decca, Dixit Dominus (Handel) with the English Chamber Orchestra and the Choir of King's College, Cambridge conducted by Stephen Cleobury, for RPO Records Paul Patterson's Mass of the Sea with the Royal Philharmonic Orchestra conducted by Geoffrey Simon, for Erato Jean-Philippe Rameau's opera Naïs with the English Bach Festival Singers and English Bach Festival Baroque Orchestra conducted by Nicholas McGegan and, for ASV, an album of Handel with the European Community Chamber Orchestra conducted by Eivind Aadland. Other recordings include a series, for Meridian, with the English Piano Trio of Scottish folk song arrangements by Haydn and Beethoven. Mackay's 1984 album My Minstrel Love was chosen as Record of the Month by Hi-Fi News & Record Review.
