= Thuli Dumakude =

- Born: Thuli Daisy Dumakude
- Origin: Lamontville, South Africa
- Occupations: Actress, singer, composer, vocal coach
- Instrument: Vocals

Thuli Daisy Dumakude is a South-African-born singer-songwriter and Broadway actress. She is best known for having originated the title role in 1983's Poppie Nongena, for which she received the Laurence Olivier Award for Actress of the Year in a New Play in 1984.

== Theater life ==
Dumakude was born in Lamontville. Before moving to Broadway, she was an actress in South Africa. She performed as KaMadonsela (Lady Macbeth) in a Zulu adaptation of William Shakespeare's Macbeth, a show that also took her to Chicago. She moved to Broadway in the early 1980s, when she was cast as the title character in Elsa Joubert's Poppie Nongena, an English translation of her book Die swerfjare van Poppie Nongena. As Poppie, Dumakude traveled to London, Toronto, Australia and Chicago. She moved to America in 1979 with her husband, Welcome Msomi, where they formed the Izulu Dance Theater.

In 1988, Dumakude was part of the cast of Julie Taymor's Juan Darién: A Carnival Mass.

In 1992, she took part in the creation of the one woman show Buya Africa, for which she was the winner of three AUDELCO Awards in New York for writing, directing and performing. She also worked as a vocal coach for the original Broadway production of Sarafina!.

In 1993, Dumakude took part in the world premiere of Gary and Bécaud's Roza. She performed as Woman and as a stand-by for Madame Bouaffa.

In 1998, she was cast as a replacement for Tsidii Le Loka's Rafiki in The Lion King, being once more directed by Julie Taymor. She stayed in the show for three years, leaving in 2001 and being replaced by Sheila Gibbs. It was actually after her suggestion that Taymor decided to make of Rafiki a female character and hire South African artists to perform in the show.

In 2009 she took part in the revival production of the Duma Ndlovu 1989 hit Sheila's Day, where she performed as Qeduszi. In this production she starred with some other cast members of The Lion King, such as Selloane Nkhela and Futhi Mhlongo.

In 2014 she took part in debbie tucker green's generations.

== Other work ==
A singer herself, Dumakude has released two studio albums: 1992's Senzeni na? and 2005's Thina Sobabili, performed with Mthakathi Ema.

In 1987, she helped compose the soundtrack of the drama movie Cry Freedom. She was also part of the soundtrack of the 1992 movie The Power of One.

During the apartheid years, Dumakude traveled the world performing musical concerts to raise awareness about the plight of her fellow South Africans. She worked with the late South African singer Miriam Makeba and sang before President Nelson Mandela at his 80th birthday celebration.

She is often invited to tour schools teaching young people about the role of Africa in the world through music and dance.

Her charitable work includes Broadway Cares/Equity Fights AIDS and the Lion King Companies in America, providing them with beaded merchandise to raise funds for HIV/AIDS. She has organized a group of 20 South African rural women to create beadwork, which is sold to theatre goers in New York to support South African AIDS organizations.

== Awards ==
Year	Award	Category	Nominated Work	Result
1983	Drama Desk Award	Outstanding Actress in a Play	Poppie Nongena	Nominated
1984	Laurence Olivier Award	Actress of the Year in a New Play	Poppie Nongena	Won
1985	Dora Mavor Moore Award	Outstanding Performance by a Female in a Principal Role	Poppie Nongena	Nominated
—N/a	Obie Award	—N/a	Poppie Nongena	Won
