= Born in the Gardens =

Born In The Gardens is a comedy play by Bristol-born playwright Peter Nichols.

Nichols wrote the play in 1979, after his now famous drama Privates On Parade was rejected by the Bristol Old Vic for being too controversial. Born In The Gardens was staged in the Theatre Royal (now the Bristol Old Vic) to celebrate its 200th anniversary. The cast for the premiere included Beryl Reid, Peter Bowles, Barry Foster and Jennie Linden and the production transferred to the Globe Theatre in London where it played for nine months. Reid won the Society of West End Theatre Award for Best Comedy Performance. A television version with Constance Chapman replacing Reid was shown in 1986.

The play centres on an elderly Bristolian mother and son living in a crumbling Victorian manor house.

The title comes from a sign in the Polar Bear enclosure in Bristol Zoological gardens and referred to a polar bear called Misha.

A touring version starring Colin Baker, Sandra Dickinson, Brian Cant and Margery Mason played Swansea Grand Theatre in the late 80s.

It was revived by the Peter Hall Company in 2008, beginning a run at the Theatre Royal, Bath, before embarking on a national tour. Stephanie Cole starred as Maud, and the cast also included Simon Shepherd, Allan Corduner, and Miranda Foster.
