= Estelle Kohler =

British theatre and television actress (born 1940)

Estelle Kohler (born 28 March 1940) is a British theatre and television actress. Born in South Africa, Kohler made a name for herself as a Shakespearean actor in England. She is a graduate of Royal Academy of Dramatic Art, of which she is an Associate Member, and was nominated a Laurence Olivier Award in 2000 for her performance as Paulina in the Barbican Centre's production of The Winter's Tale (1999 season). She is also remembered for her performance as Hilary Nash (later Main) in the TV series The Main Chance, opposite John Stride. Her voice is featured in several audio books by Naxos Audiobooks.
