= One Mo' Time (musical) =

Musical revue

- Playbill cover of 2002 Broadway production
- Music: Lars Edengran; Orange Kellin
- Book: Vernel Bagneris
- Setting: 1926. The Lyric Theatre, New Orleans.
- Productions: Off-Broadway (1979); West End (1981); Broadway (2002)

One Mo' Time is a musical revue conceived by Vernel Bagneris. It is an evening of 1920s African-American vaudeville, set in the Lyric Theatre of New Orleans in 1926. The show first opened off-Broadway in 1979. It opened on the West End in 1981, and was revived on Broadway in 2002.

== Synopsis ==
One Mo' Time follows an evening of African-American vaudeville at the Lyric Theatre in New Orleans on one night in 1926. The Lyric Theatre was on the black vaudeville circuit known as the Theatre Owners Booking Association (T.O.B.A.). The show follows Big Bertha's touring vaudeville show, with dialogue from offstage characters moving the plot.

== Production history ==
=== Original off-Broadway production ===
The Off-Broadway production opened in New York at the Village Gate Theatre in October 1979. At the 23rd Annual Grammy Awards in 1980, the show's recording was nominated for Best Original Cast Show Album. One of the members in the orchestra was the legendary trumpeter Jabbo Smith, who was a rival of Louis Armstrong in the late 1920s.

=== West End ===
On July 14, 1981, the West End production of One Mo' Time opened at the Cambridge Theatre. It was nominated for several Olivier awards, including the Olivier Award for Best New Musical. In addition, Sylbia Kumba Williams was nominated for Actress of the Year in a Musical, and Vernel Bagneris as nominated for Outstanding Achievement of the Year in a Musical.

=== Broadway ===
The musical was revived on Broadway at the Longacre Theatre following a successful run as the 2001 Williamstown Theatre Festival's mainstage opener. It has its first preview on February 21, 2002 and had 16 total preview performances. Opening night was on March 6, 2002 and, after 21 regular performances, closing night was March 24, 2002. The total gross amount was $514,302.

The cast included book-writer Vernel Bagneris as Papa Du, B.J. Crosby as Ma Reed, Rosalind Brown as Thelma, Wally Dunn as the Theatre Owner, and Roz Ryan as Bertha. Campbell Baird was the set designer, Toni-Leslie James was the costume designer, John McKernon was the lighting designer, and Kurt Kullenberger was the sound designer. The production had mixed reviews, with positive remarks from the New York Daily News, USA Today, the Hollywood Reporter and Entertainment Weekly, and negative reviews from The New York Times and Variety. The Williamstown Theatre Festival produced the Broadway run.
