= The Secret Rapture (play) =

Play written by David Hare

- Poster of original production
- Original language: English
- Written by: David Hare
- Setting: 1980s Britain

Premiere
- Date: Lyttelton, Royal National Theatre, 1988

The Secret Rapture is a 1988 British play by David Hare. Its premiere in the Lyttelton auditorium of the Royal National Theatre was directed by Howard Davies. British revivals of the play have included one at the Salisbury Playhouse in 2001 and at the Lyric Theatre, London in 2003. Hare later adapted it as 1993 film of the same title, also directed by Davies.

It is set in 1980s Britain and examines the impact of Thatcherism on personal relationships within the family of a junior government minister after her father's death. Hare states that its title refers to a nun's feeling of ecstasy on being received by God at the moment of her death, rather than the Protestant concept of the Rapture.

== Synopsis ==
Estranged sisters Isobel and Marion are forced to reunite when their father dies and they must decide how to handle Katherine, their young, alcoholic, mentally unstable stepmother who has been left nothing but the rural home in which they were raised. Isobel and her lover Irwin own a small graphic design company that is struggling to stay afloat. Her sister suggests she and her born-again Christian husband Tom help them expand the business by finding investors and making Katherine a partner responsible for finding new business. Isobel has grave misgivings about the plan, but finally agrees to it when Marion convinces Irwin of its potential success. Before long, the strain of running the expanded business causes a deterioration in Isobel's relationship with Irwin, who is becoming increasingly dependent upon her, while at the same time Katherine's tenuous hold on sanity begins to unravel.

== Plot ==
=== Act 1 ===
==== Scene 1 ====
Isobel is sitting with the body of her father Robert, who has just died. Her elder sister Marion arrives to claim a ring she had given him and the two sisters begin to argue. Marion's husband Tom arrives and Marion leaves, angry with Isobel, then Tom and Isobel talk before leaving.

==== Scene 2 ====
Isobel and her father's second wife, the alcoholic Katherine, sit in the garden of Robert's house just after his funeral. Marion and Tom arrive and an argument begins when Katherine suddenly introduces her idea that she would like to join Isobel's small design firm. Katherine storms out and finds a hidden bottle of drink before returning, whereupon the previously doubtful Isobel agrees that Katherine can join the firm.

==== Scene 3 ====
In the office of Isobel's firm she and her lover Irwin attempt to enjoy a rare evening without Katherine, until Katherine arrives to tell them how she has taken Isobel's friend Max out to dinner. Katherine criticises Irwin's design work before leaving and Irwin tries to convince Isobel to get rid of her. Katherine returns and, when Isobel proves unable or unwilling to eject Katherine, Irwin intervenes and asks Katherine to leave in the morning. Katherine leaves temporarily and Isobel refuses to agree to her ejection from the firm.

==== Scene 4 ====
Back at Robert's house, Marion and Tom try to convince Isobel to let them invest in her firm to help it expand, with Irwin betraying Isobel by supporting them rather than her.

=== Act 2 ===
==== Scene 1 ====
Marion's secretary Rhonda comes round to Isobel's firm's new offices for a shower, and she and Irwin flirt over a bottle of champagne until Isobel arrives back unexpectedly. Rhonda leaves for the shower and Isobel reveals that Katherine has stabbed one of the firm's clients and so has had to be put into a rehab clinic. Isobel and Irwin argue and Rhonda returns to the office before leaving to go to the cinema. Isobel surprises her and Irwin by suggesting that they come too and the three leave together.

==== Scene 2 ====
The expansion of Isobel's firm having failed, Marion and Tom wait in Tom's office, to which Irwin comes for a business meeting. He tells them how Isobel left the cinema halfway through the film and took a spur-of-the-moment holiday to Lanzarote, before returning to care for Katherine. He also admits how he is still in love with Isobel despite the friction that now exists between them and Marion criticises her sister's handling of the situation. Isobel arrives and refuses to come into the office until Irwin leaves. Irwin leaves, Isobel enters and she and Marion argue until Isobel finally leaves. A born-again evangelical Christian, Tom then criticises Marion and leaves to pray for Isobel and Irwin.

==== Scene 3 ====
In the lounge of Katherine's flat, Isobel attempts to make her dinner and the two talk before preparing a sofa-bed for Isobel to stay the night. Katherine leaves for her bedroom and Isobel settles down to read, before Irwin arrives, thanks to Katherine who has secretly disobeyed Isobel and unbolted the door so he can get in. Irwin has brought a gun with him and begs Isobel to sleep with him - she refuses and the pair argue. Katherine returns and Isobel fails to convince her to go out to get the police to eject Irwin. Isobel then prepares to go out and Irwin shoots her just as she leaves.

==== Scene 4 ====
Back at Robert's house, Marion, Tom and Katherine reinstate its furniture and prepare for Isobel's funeral. Katherine leaves and Tom and Marion discuss her emotional difficulties. They then kiss and Tom leaves, before Marion ends the play with an emotional appeal to her dead sister.

== Cast (premiere) ==
- Marion - Penelope Wilton
- Tom - Paul Shelley
- Katherine - Clare Higgins
- Isobel - Jill Baker
- Irwin - Mick Ford
- Rhonda Milne - Arkie Whiteley
