= Harlequinade (Rattigan) =

1948 comic play by Terence Rattigan

1948 theatre programme for original production Playbill, comprising The Browning Version & Harlequinade

Harlequinade is a comic play by Terence Rattigan.

The play was first performed on 8 September 1948 at the Phoenix Theatre, London, along with The Browning Version.

== Synopsis ==
This is a one act play about a professional theatre company presenting Romeo and Juliet. The opening night is in the town of Brackley in the English Midlands. The principal characters are Arthur and his wife Edna (who play Romeo and Juliet) and the stage manager Jack. Arthur is horrified to be confronted by his grown up daughter (Muriel) and grandchild, neither of whose existences he had been aware of. To discover that he's a grandfather just before playing Romeo is too much for him. They later learn that he's still married to Muriel's mother (Flossie) and that he is bigamously married to Edna. There are a number of other threads running through this play, such as Jack's attempts to leave the theatre and do a 'real job' and the humdrum world of bit players and the attempts in post-war Britain to bring culture to the masses. It is a funny farce which has a strong satirical element.

== Productions ==
Original West End production

The play opened on a double bill (Playbill) with The Browning Version, at the Phoenix Theatre, directed by Peter Glenville, with the following cast:

- Arthur Gosport - Eric Portman
- Edna Selby - Mary Ellis
- Dame Maud Gosport - Marie Lohr
- Jack Wakefield - Hector Ross
- George Chudleigh - Kenneth Edwards
- First Halberdier - Peter Scott
- Second Halberdier - Basil Howes
- Miss Fishlock - Noël Dyson
- Fred Ingram - Anthony Oliver
- Assistant Stage Manager - Henry Bryce
- Muriel Palmer - Thelma Ruby
- Tom Palmer - Patrick Jordan
- Mr. Burton - Campbell Cotts
- Joyce Langland - Henryetta Edwards
- Policeman - Manville Tarrant

Original Broadway production

The play opened on Broadway with The Browning Version, on 12 October at the Coronet Theater, with Maurice Evans playing Arthur and Edna Best playing Edna.

West End 2015-2016

Harlequinade was played from 17 October 2015 until 16 January 2016 at the Garrick Theatre together with one-woman play All On Her Own. The show was played by the Kenneth Branagh Theatre Company with Kenneth Branagh playing Arthur and Miranda Raison playing Edna.

== Adaptations ==
It was adapted for Australian television in 1961.
