= The Browning Version (play) =

Terence Rattigan play from 1948

- Programme for original Broadway production with Maurice Evans & Edna Best
- Original language: English
- Written by: Terence Rattigan
- Characters: Taplow, Andrew Crocker-Harris, Frank, Mrs Crocker-Harris
- Setting: A British public school

Premiere
- Date: 8 September 1948
- Place: Phoenix Theatre, London

The Browning Version is a play by Terence Rattigan, seen by many as his best work, and first performed on 8 September 1948 at the Phoenix Theatre, London. It was originally one of two short plays, jointly titled "Playbill"; the companion piece being Harlequinade, which forms the second half of the evening. The Browning Version is set in a boys' public school and the Classics teacher in the play, Crocker-Harris, is believed to have been based on Rattigan's Classics tutor at Harrow School, J. W. Coke Norris (1874–1961).

== Plot ==
Andrew Crocker-Harris is a classics teacher at an English boys' school. After eighteen years of teaching there, today is his last day before moving on to a position at another school. The students speculate on why he is leaving, but do not much care since despite being academically brilliant, he is generally despised as being strict, stern and humourless. They have nicknamed him "The Crock". Even the school administrators treat him poorly regardless of his long tenure. Millie Crocker-Harris, his wife, is younger and vivacious and quite different from her husband. She no longer loves him but instead loves Frank Hunter, another teacher, yet despite having an affair with him she knows that he is not in love with her. On this last day, one student named Taplow, who does not hate Crocker-Harris but feels sorry for him, gives him a small going-away gift – a copy of the translation by Robert Browning of Aeschylus's ancient play Agamemnon. The gift brings about a series of actions which make Crocker-Harris reflect on his past, contemplate his future, and evaluate how he is going to finish his tenure at the school.

== Original production ==
In the original production, Crocker-Harris was played by Eric Portman, and his wife by Mary Ellis. Barry Jones took over the role of Crocker-Harris, with the run ending on 9 April 1949. Reviews were enthusiastic, with the play being hailed as "a 70 minute masterpiece."

- John Taplow – Peter Scott
- Frank Hunter – Hector Ross
- Millie Crocker-Harris – Mary Ellis
- Andrew Crocker-Harris – Eric Portman
- Dr. Frobisher – Campbell Cotts
- Peter Gilbert – Anthony Oliver
- Mrs. Gilbert – Henryetta Edwards

Decor by Paul Sheriff.

== Original Broadway production ==
In 1949, the play was performed on Broadway, opening on 12 October at the Coronet Theater on 49th street with Maurice Evans and Edna Best. The play and its companion-piece Harlequinade failed to find favour with New York critics (with Time calling it "bilge"), and it closed after 62 performances. Peter Scott-Smith as John Taplow was the sole member of the West End cast to reprise his role on Broadway.

- Millie Crocker-Harris – Edna Best
- Andrew Crocker-Harris – Maurice Evans
- Peter Gilbert – Frederick Bradlee
- Dr. Frobisher – Louis Hector
- Frank Hunter – Ron Randell
- John Taplow – Peter Scott-Smith
- Mrs. Gilbert – Patricia Wheel

Scenic design by Frederick Stover.

== Revivals ==
A 1982 production by New York's Roundabout Theatre Company, starring Lee Richardson and Sheila Allen, was part of a double-bill with J. M. Barrie's The Twelve-Pound Look.

The Royalty Theatre produced the play in the West End of London with its counterpart Harlequinade in 1988, starring Paul Eddington and Dorothy Tutin as Andrew and Millie Crocker Harris, with a stellar supporting cast including Jean Anderson, John Duttine, Daniel Beales, Jack Watling and Simon Shepherd. It was directed by Tim Luscombe.

The Theatre Royal Bath put the play on in 2009 in a double bill with Chekhov's one-act play Swansong, both starring Peter Bowles. A production at the Chichester Festival Theatre (alongside South Downs, a new play written in response to it by David Hare) marked Rattigan's centenary in 2011. The same double production of The Browning Version and South Downs ran at London's Harold Pinter Theatre from April through July 2012 and starred Nicholas Farrell as Crocker-Harris and Anna Chancellor as Millie.

== Adaptations ==
The play has been adapted twice for the cinema, and at least four television versions. The 1951 film version, starring Michael Redgrave as Crocker-Harris, won two awards at the Cannes Film Festival, one for Rattigan's screenplay (with which he lengthened the original stage version for the final speech), the other for Redgrave's performance. It was remade in 1994, starring Albert Finney, Michael Gambon, Greta Scacchi, Matthew Modine, Julian Sands and young Ben Silverstone. A British television production was broadcast in 1955, starring Peter Cushing as Crocker-Harris. John Frankenheimer directed John Gielgud in a 1959 television version for CBS. In 1960, Maurice Evans repeated his Broadway role for CBC Television under the sponsorship of Ford of Canada in their Startime series. Another made-for-TV version in 1985 starred Ian Holm as the main character for the BBC.

Lux Radio Theatre produced a radio adaptation with Ronald Colman, Benita Hume and Robert Douglas which was aired on November 23, 1953. Another version was broadcast on the BBC Home Service in September 1957. It was directed by Norman Wright and adapted by Cynthia Pughe with John Gielgud, Angela Baddeley, Brewster Mason and Anthony Adams. In June 2011 a third adaptation was broadcast on BBC Radio 4. It was directed by Martin Jarvis, and featured Michael York, Joanne Whalley, Ioan Gruffudd and Ian Ogilvy. Jarvis can be heard playing the main role in an L.A. Theatre Works production that again features Ogilvy, this time with Kate Steele, Steven Brand and Daniel David Stewart.

A staged reading was performed on 3 April 2012 at The Players Club in New York City, presented by TAPT (The Artists' Playground Theater), directed by Alex Kelly and starring Matthew Dure', Robert Lyons, Nichole Donje' Jeffrey Hardy, Steven Hauck, Max Rhyser, Jessica Beaudry and Kate Downey.
