= List of awards and nominations received by Maggie Smith =

Maggie Smith awards and nominations
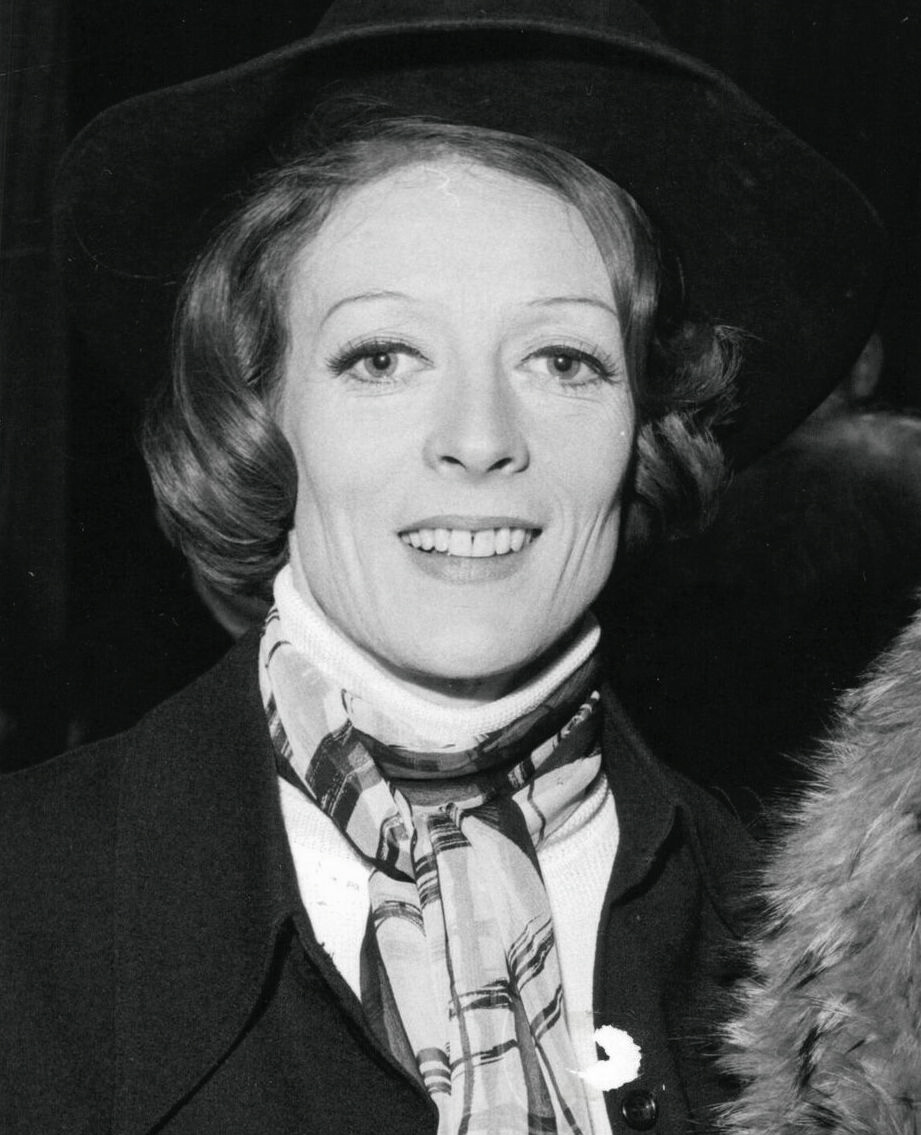
- Smith in 1973
Awards and nominations
Award	Wins	Nominations
Academy Awards	2	6
Actor Awards	5	13
BAFTA Awards	5	18
Emmy Awards	4	9
Golden Globe Awards	3	12
Laurence Olivier Awards	0	6
Tony Awards	1	3

Totals (Note: Certain award groups do not simply award one winner. They acknowledge several different recipients, have runners-up, and have third place. Since this is a specific recognition and is different from losing an award, runner-up mentions are considered wins in this award tally. For simplification and to avoid errors, each award in this list has been presumed to have had a prior nomination.)
- Wins: 49
- Nominations: 139

Maggie Smith was a British actress. She is the recipient of numerous accolades including two Academy Awards, five British Academy Film Awards, a Tony Award, four Primetime Emmy Awards, five Actor Awards and three Golden Globe Awards. She is one of few performers who have been awarded a Triple Crown of Acting (Oscar, Tony and Emmy).

Smith began her stage career as a student, performing at the Oxford Playhouse in 1952, and made her Broadway theatre debut in 1956. For her work at the West End theatre, she received six nominations for Laurence Olivier Awards and won six Evening Standard Theatre Awards. For her work at Broadway, she received three Tony Awards nominations, winning the Tony Award for Best Actress in a Play for Lettice and Lovage (1990). She made her film debut in Child in the House (1956). She was nominated for the BAFTA Award for Most Promising Newcomer to Film for Nowhere to Go (1958), for the Golden Globe Award for New Star of the Year – Actress for The V.I.P.s (1963) and for the Academy Award for Best Supporting Actress for Othello (1965). The role which brought her international fame was in The Prime of Miss Jean Brodie (1969), for which she won the Academy Award for Best Actress and the BAFTA Award for Best Actress in a Leading Role. She received her second Academy Award, for Best Supporting Actress, for California Suite (1978), as well as nominations for Travels with My Aunt (1972), A Room with a View (1985) and Gosford Park (2001). She won four subsequent BAFTA Awards: as the Best Actress in a Leading Role for A Private Function (1984), A Room with a View (1985) and The Lonely Passion of Judith Hearne (1987), and as the Best Actress in a Supporting Role for Tea with Mussolini (1999). She also received the Golden Globe Award for Best Actress in a Motion Picture – Musical or Comedy for California Suite (1978) and the Golden Globe Award for Best Supporting Actress – Motion Picture for A Room with a View (1985).

She appeared in multiple television series and television films, receiving five nominations for the British Academy Television Awards. She won the Primetime Emmy Award for Outstanding Lead Actress in a Limited or Anthology Series or Movie for the HBO television film My House in Umbria (2003). She gained worldwide attention and acclaim for her performance in the ITV television series Downton Abbey, earning three Primetime Emmy Awards (one for Outstanding Supporting Actress in a Limited or Anthology Series or Movie and two for Outstanding Supporting Actress in a Drama Series), the Golden Globe Award for Best Supporting Actress – Series, Miniseries or Television Film and four Screen Actors Guild Awards (one for Outstanding Performance by a Female Actor in a Drama Series and three shared for Outstanding Performance by an Ensemble in a Drama Series).

She has received multiple numerous honorary accolades including the BAFTA Special Award (1993), the BAFTA Fellowship (1996), the Society of London Theatre Special Award (2010), the Evening Standard Theatre Award for the Theatre Icon (2013) and the Critics' Circle Award for Distinguished Service to the Arts (2016). She received several state honours and honorary degrees. In 1990, she was made a Dame by Queen Elizabeth II.

Key
†	Indicates non-competitive categories

== Major associations ==
=== Academy Awards ===
Year	Category	Work	Result	Ref.
1966	Best Supporting Actress	Othello	Nominated	
1970	Best Actress	The Prime of Miss Jean Brodie	Won	
1973	Best Actress	Travels with My Aunt	Nominated	
1979	Best Supporting Actress	California Suite	Won	
1987	Best Supporting Actress	A Room with a View	Nominated	
2002	Best Supporting Actress	Gosford Park	Nominated	

=== Actor Awards ===
Year	Category	Work	Result	Ref.
2002	Outstanding Cast in a Motion Picture	Gosford Park	Won (Note: Shared with the cast.)	
2012	Outstanding Female Actor in a Miniseries or Television Movie	Downton Abbey	Nominated	
2013	Outstanding Female Actor in a Supporting Role	The Best Exotic Marigold Hotel	Nominated	
2013	Outstanding Cast in a Motion Picture	The Best Exotic Marigold Hotel	Nominated	
2013	Outstanding Female Actor in a Drama Series	Downton Abbey	Nominated	
2013	Outstanding Ensemble in a Drama Series	Downton Abbey	Won	
2014	Outstanding Female Actor in a Drama Series	Downton Abbey	Won	
2014	Outstanding Ensemble in a Drama Series	Downton Abbey	Nominated	
2015	Outstanding Female Actor in a Drama Series	Downton Abbey	Nominated	
2015	Outstanding Ensemble in a Drama Series	Downton Abbey	Won	
2016	Outstanding Female Actor in a Drama Series	Downton Abbey	Nominated	
2016	Outstanding Ensemble in a Drama Series	Downton Abbey	Won	
2017	Outstanding Ensemble in a Drama Series	Downton Abbey	Nominated	

=== BAFTA Awards ===
Year	Category	Work	Result	Ref.
British Academy Film Awards
1959	Most Promising Newcomer to Film	Nowhere to Go	Nominated	
1966	Best British Actress	Young Cassidy	Nominated	
1970	Best Actress in a Leading Role	The Prime of Miss Jean Brodie	Won	
1979	Best Actress in a Supporting Role	Death on the Nile	Nominated	
1980	Best Actress in a Leading Role	California Suite	Nominated	
1982	Best Actress in a Leading Role	Quartet	Nominated	
1985	Best Actress in a Leading Role	A Private Function	Won	
1987	Best Actress in a Leading Role	Room with a View	Won	
1989	Best Actress in a Leading Role	The Lonely Passion of Judith Hearne	Won	
1994	Best Actress in a Supporting Role	The Secret Garden	Nominated	
2000	Best Actress in a Supporting Role	Tea with Mussolini	Won	
2002	Best Actress in a Supporting Role	Gosford Park	Nominated	
2016	Best Actress in a Leading Role	The Lady in the Van	Nominated	
British Academy Television Awards
1984	Best Actress	All for Love (episode: "Mrs. Silly")	Nominated	
1989	Best Actress	Talking Heads (episode: "Bed Among the Lentils")	Nominated	
1993	Best Actress	Screen Two (episode: "Memento Mori")	Nominated	
2000	Best Actress	David Copperfield	Nominated	
2012	Best Supporting Actress	Downton Abbey	Nominated	
Honorary awards
1993	Special Award †	—N/a	Won	
1996	BAFTA Fellowship †	—N/a	Won	

=== Emmy Awards ===
Year	Category	Work	Result	Ref.
Primetime Emmy Awards
1993	Outstanding Lead Actress in a Miniseries or a Special	Great Performances (episode: "Suddenly Last Summer")	Nominated	
2000	Outstanding Supporting Actress in a Miniseries or Movie	David Copperfield	Nominated	
2003	Outstanding Lead Actress in a Miniseries or a Movie	My House in Umbria	Won	
2010	Outstanding Lead Actress in a Miniseries or a Movie	Capturing Mary	Nominated	
2011	Outstanding Supporting Actress in a Miniseries or Movie	Downton Abbey	Won	
2012	Outstanding Supporting Actress in a Drama Series	Downton Abbey	Won	
2013	Outstanding Supporting Actress in a Drama Series	Downton Abbey	Nominated	
2014	Outstanding Supporting Actress in a Drama Series	Downton Abbey	Nominated	
2016	Outstanding Supporting Actress in a Drama Series	Downton Abbey	Won	

=== Golden Globe Awards ===
Year	Category	Work	Result	Ref.
1964	New Star of the Year – Actress	The V.I.P.s	Nominated	
1966	Best Actress in a Motion Picture – Drama	Othello	Nominated	
1970	Best Actress in a Motion Picture – Drama	The Prime of Miss Jean Brodie	Nominated	
1973	Best Actress in a Motion Picture – Musical or Comedy	Travels with My Aunt	Nominated	
1979	Best Actress in a Motion Picture – Musical or Comedy	California Suite	Won (Note: Tied with Ellen Burstyn for Same Time, Next Year.)	
1987	Best Supporting Actress – Motion Picture	Room with a View	Won	
2002	Best Supporting Actress – Motion Picture	Gosford Park	Nominated	
2004	Best Actress – Miniseries or Television Film	My House in Umbria	Nominated	
2012	Best Supporting Actress – Series, Miniseries or Television Film	Downton Abbey	Nominated	
2013	Best Supporting Actress – Series, Miniseries or Television Film	Downton Abbey	Won	
2013	Best Actress in a Motion Picture – Musical or Comedy	Quartet	Nominated	
2016	Best Actress in a Motion Picture – Musical or Comedy	The Lady in the Van	Nominated	

=== Laurence Olivier Awards ===
Year	Category	Work	Result	Ref.
1981	Actress of the Year in a New Play	Virginia	Nominated	
1985	Comedy Performance of the Year	The Way of the World	Nominated	
1987	Actress of the Year	Lettice and Lovage and Coming into Land	Nominated	
1994	Best Comedy Performance	The Importance of Being Earnest	Nominated	
1998	Best Actress	A Delicate Balance	Nominated	
2000	Best Actress	The Lady in the Van	Nominated	
2010	Special Award †	—N/a	Won	

=== Tony Awards ===
Year	Category	Work	Result	Ref.
1975	Best Actress in a Play	Private Lives	Nominated	
1980	Best Actress in a Play	Night and Day	Nominated	
1990	Best Actress in a Play	Lettice and Lovage	Won	

== Miscellaneous awards ==
Awards and nominations received by Jessica Lange
Award	Year (Note: The listed year refers to the date of the ceremony.)	Category	Work	Result	Ref.
AARP Movies for Grownups Awards	2002	Best Actress	Gosford Park	Nominated	
AARP Movies for Grownups Awards	2003	Breakaway Performance	Divine Secrets of the Ya-Ya Sisterhood	Nominated	
AARP Movies for Grownups Awards	2007	Best Actress	Keeping Mum	Nominated	
AARP Movies for Grownups Awards	2015	Best Actress	My Old Lady	Nominated	
AARP Movies for Grownups Awards	2016	Best Actress	The Lady in the Van	Nominated	
AARP Movies for Grownups Awards	2020	Best Supporting Actress	Downton Abbey	Nominated	
Alliance of Women Film Journalists	2018	Actress Defying Age and Ageism	Nothing Like a Dame (Note: Known as Tea With the Dames in the United States.)	Nominated (Note: Shared with Eileen Atkins, Judi Dench and Joan Plowright.)	
Alliance of Women Film Journalists	2019	Actress Defying Age and Ageism	Downton Abbey	Nominated	
British Independent Film Awards	2012	Best Supporting Actress	The Best Exotic Marigold Hotel	Nominated	
Broadcasting Press Guild Awards	2008	Best Actress	Capturing Mary	Nominated	
Broadcasting Press Guild Awards	2011	Best Actress	Downton Abbey	Nominated	
Chicago Film Critics Association	2002	Best Supporting Actress	Gosford Park	Nominated	
Chlotrudis Society for Independent Films	1998	Best Supporting Actress	Washington Square	Nominated	
The Critics' Circle	2016	Distinguished Service to the Arts †	—N/a	Won	
Dallas–Fort Worth Film Critics Association	2002	Best Supporting Actress	Gosford Park	Nominated	
Drama Desk Awards	1975	Outstanding Actress in a Play	Private Lives	Nominated	
European Film Awards	2002	People's Choice Award – Best European Actress	Gosford Park	Nominated	
European Film Awards	2005	Best Actress	Ladies in Lavender	Nominated (Note: Shared with Judi Dench.)	
Evening Standard British Film Awards	1980	Best Actress	California Suite	Won	
Evening Standard British Film Awards	1982	Best Actress	Quartet	Won	
Evening Standard British Film Awards	1989	Best Actress	The Lonely Passion of Judith Hearne	Won (Note: Tied with Billie Whitelaw for The Dressmaker.)	
Evening Standard British Film Awards	2016	Best Actress	The Lady in the Van	Won	
Evening Standard Theatre Awards	1962	Best Actress	The Private Ear / The Public Eye	Won	
Evening Standard Theatre Awards	1970	Best Actress	Hedda Gabler	Won	
Evening Standard Theatre Awards	1981	Best Actress	Virginia	Won	
Evening Standard Theatre Awards	1984	Best Actress	The Way of the World	Won	
Evening Standard Theatre Awards	1994	Best Actress	Three Tall Women	Won	
Evening Standard Theatre Awards	2013	Theatre Icon Award †	—N/a	Won	
Evening Standard Theatre Awards	2019	Best Actress	A German Life	Won	
Golden Nymph Awards	2011	Outstanding Actress – Drama Series	Downton Abbey	Nominated	
Golden Nymph Awards	2013	Outstanding Actress – Drama Series	Downton Abbey	Nominated	
Golden Nymph Awards	2014	Outstanding Actress – Drama Series	Downton Abbey	Nominated	
Helpmann Awards	2004	Best Female Actor in a Play	Talking Heads	Won	
Kansas City Film Critics Circle	1978	Best Supporting Actress	California Suite	Won	
Kansas City Film Critics Circle	1986	Best Supporting Actress	A Room with a View	Won	
Kansas City Film Critics Circle	2001	Best Supporting Actress	Gosford Park	Won (Note: Tied with Jennifer Connelly for A Beautiful Mind.)	
Los Angeles Drama Critics Circle Awards	1970	Best Performance	Three Sisters	Won (Note: Tied with Brian Bedford for Private Lives, Roscoe Lee Browne for Dream on Monkey Mountain and Louis Gossett Jr. for Murderous Angels.)	
National Film Awards	2016	Best Breakthrough Performance	The Lady in the Van	Nominated	
National Society of Film Critics	1979	Best Actress	California Suite	4th place	
National Society of Film Critics	1979	Best Supporting Actress	California Suite	3rd place	
National Society of Film Critics	2002	Best Supporting Actress	Gosford Park	2th place	
National Television Awards	2014	Most Popular Drama Performance	Downton Abbey	Nominated	
National Television Awards	2015	Most Popular Drama Performance	Downton Abbey	Nominated	
New York Film Critics Circle	1969	Best Actress	Oh! What a Lovely War	3th place	
New York Film Critics Circle	1969	Best Supporting Actress	Oh! What a Lovely War	5th place	
New York Film Critics Circle	1978	Best Supporting Actress	California Suite	2nd place	
New York Film Critics Circle	2001	Best Supporting Actress	Gosford Park	2nd place	
New York Film Critics Online	2001	Best Supporting Actress	Gosford Park	Won	
Online Film Critics Society	2001	Best Supporting Actress	Gosford Park	Nominated	
Outer Critics Circle Awards	1975	Best Performance	Private Lives	Nominated	
Outer Critics Circle Awards	1990	Outstanding Actress in a Play	Lettice and Lovage	Nominated	
People's Choice Awards	2013	Favorite Movie Icon	—N/a	Nominated	
People's Choice Awards	2014	Favorite Cable TV Actress	—N/a	Nominated	
Phoenix Film Critics Society	2002	Best Supporting Actress	Gosford Park	Nominated	
Royal Television Society Programme Awards	1989	Best Performance: Female	Talking Heads	Won	
San Diego Film Critics Society	2001	Best Supporting Actress	Gosford Park	Runner-up	
Satellite Awards	2002	Best Supporting Actress – Comedy or Musical	Gosford Park	Won	
Satellite Awards	2004	Best Actress – Miniseries or Television Film	My House in Umbria	Nominated	
Satellite Awards	2011	Best Supporting Actress – Series, Miniseries or Television Film	Downton Abbey	Nominated	
Satellite Awards	2012	Best Supporting Actress – Series, Miniseries or Television Film	Downton Abbey	Won	
Saturn Awards	1982	Best Supporting Actress	Clash of the Titans	Nominated	
Saturn Awards	2002	Best Supporting Actress	Harry Potter and the Philosopher's Stone (Note: Known as Harry Potter and the Sorcerer's Stone in the United States.)	Nominated	
Shakespeare Theatre Company	1999	Will Award †	—N/a	Won	
Southeastern Film Critics Association	2001	Best Supporting Actress	Gosford Park	Won (Note: Tied with Jennifer Connelly for A Beautiful Mind and Marisa Tomei for In the Bedroom.)	
Stinkers Bad Movie Awards	2003	Worst Fake Accent – Female	Divine Secrets of the Ya-Ya Sisterhood	4th place	
Stratford Festival	2012	Legacy Award †	—N/a	Won	
Women Film Critics Circle	2012	Best Comedic Actress	The Best Exotic Marigold Hotel	Won	
Women Film Critics Circle	2012	Women's Work: Best Ensemble	The Best Exotic Marigold Hotel	Won (Note: Shared with Judi Dench, Penelope Wilton and Celia Imrie.)	
Women's Image Network Awards	2010	Actress Mini-Series / Made for Television Movie	Capturing Mary	Nominated	

== Honours ==
=== State honours ===
Country	Honor	Year	Ref.
United Kingdom	Commander of the Order of the British Empire	1970	
United Kingdom	Damehood	1990	
United Kingdom	Order of the Companions of Honour	2014	

=== Miscellaneous honours ===
Organization	Honor	Year	Ref.
Bodleian Library	Bodley Medal	2016	
British Film Institute	British Film Institute Fellowship	1992	
Mansfield College, Oxford	Honorary Fellowship	2017	
University of Bath	Doctor of Letters	1986	
University of Cambridge	Doctor of Letters	1994	
University of St Andrews	Honorary degree	1971	

== See also ==
- List of Maggie Smith performances
- Triple Crown of Acting
- EGOT
- List of Academy Award winners and nominees from Great Britain
- List of actors with two or more Academy Awards in acting categories
- List of actors with Academy Award nominations
- List of actors with more than one Academy Award nomination in the acting categories
