= List of Maggie Smith performances =

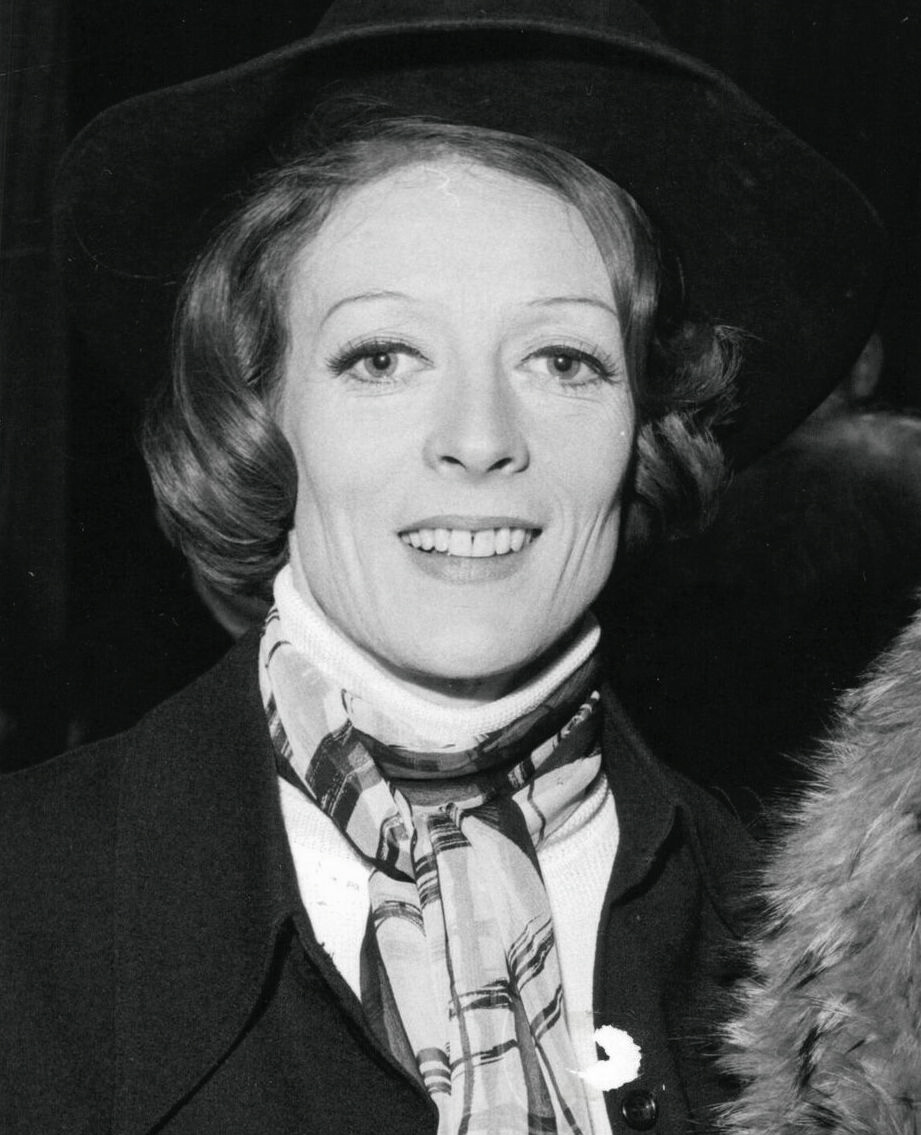
Smith in 1973

Dame Maggie Smith was a British actress who worked in theatre, television and film. She made her professional theatre debut in 1956 playing Viola in William Shakespeare's Twelfth Night at the Oxford Playhouse. She made her Broadway debut in musical revue New Faces of 1956 (1956). Smith excelled in both comedy and drama performing in various works of Shakespeare, Anton Chekhov, Noël Coward, Edward Albee and Tom Stoppard. She received three Tony Award nominations for Private Lives (1975) and Night and Day (1980) before winning in 1990 for Lettice and Lovage.

Smith was also known for her film roles and started acting in films in the late 1950s before gaining her breakthrough film role in Othello (1965) in which she acted alongside Laurence Olivier and Michael Gambon. She won her first Academy Award for her performance in The Prime of Miss Jean Brodie (1969). She received her second win for her role as an Oscar loser in Neil Simon's California Suite (1978). Other notable roles include Travels with My Aunt (1972), Death on the Nile (1978), A Room with a View (1986), Richard III (1995), Gosford Park (2001) and Quartet (2012). Smith also starred in the commercially successful films Hook (1991), Sister Act (1992), The Secret Garden (1993) and The Best Exotic Marigold Hotel (2011) and its sequel. Additionally, she gained worldwide attention and acclaim for her role as Minerva McGonagall in the Harry Potter film series (2001–2011).

Smith was also known for her roles on television appearing in various programmes including, BBC Sunday Night Theatre, Theatre Royal, Play of the Week, Armchair Theatre, Play of the Month and Screen Two. She also guest starred in The Carol Burnett Show. Smith received Primetime Emmy Award nominations for her work in Suddenly, Last Summer (1992), David Copperfield (1999) and Capturing Mary (2010). Smith won for My House in Umbria (2003). Smith gained international acclaim for her performance in Downton Abbey (2010–2015) as the Violet Crawley, Dowager Countess of Grantham. She received five Primetime Emmy Award nominations winning three times.

== Acting credits ==
=== Film ===
| Year | Title | Role | Notes |
|---|---|---|---|
| 1956 | Child in the House | Party Guest | |
| 1958 | Nowhere to Go | Bridget Howard | |
| 1962 | Go to Blazes | Chantal | |
| 1963 | The V.I.P.s | Miss Mead | |
| 1964 | The Pumpkin Eater | Philpot | |
| 1965 | Young Cassidy | Nora | |
| 1965 | Othello | Desdemona | |
| 1967 | The Honey Pot | Sarah Watkins | |
| 1968 | Hot Millions | Patty Terwilliger Smith | |
| 1969 | The Prime of Miss Jean Brodie | Jean Brodie | |
| 1969 | Oh! What a Lovely War | Music Hall Star | |
| 1972 | Travels with My Aunt | Aunt Augusta Bertram | |
| 1973 | Love and Pain and the Whole Damn Thing | Lila Fisher | |
| 1976 | Murder by Death | Dora Charleston | |
| 1978 | Death on the Nile | Miss Bowers | |
| 1978 | California Suite | Diana Barrie | |
| 1981 | Quartet | Lois Heidler | |
| 1981 | Clash of the Titans | Thetis | |
| 1982 | Evil Under the Sun | Daphne Castle | |
| 1982 | The Missionary | Lady Isabel Ames | |
| 1983 | Better Late Than Never | Miss Anderson | |
| 1984 | Lily in Love | Lily Wynn | |
| 1984 | A Private Function | Joyce Chilvers | |
| 1985 | A Room with a View | Charlotte Bartlett | |
| 1987 | The Lonely Passion of Judith Hearne | Judith Hearne | |
| 1990 | Romeo.Juliet | Rosaline | Voice |
| 1991 | Hook | Wendy Darling | |
| 1992 | Sister Act | Mother Superior | |
| 1993 | The Secret Garden | Mrs Medlock | |
| 1993 | Sister Act 2: Back in the Habit | Mother Superior | |
| 1995 | Richard III | Cecily Neville | |
| 1996 | The First Wives Club | Gunilla Garson Goldberg | |
| 1997 | Washington Square | Aunt Lavinia Penniman | |
| 1999 | Curtain Call | Lily Marlowe | Re-released as It All Came True |
| 1999 | Tea with Mussolini | Lady Hester Random | |
| 1999 | The Last September | Lady Myra Naylor | |
| 2001 | Harry Potter and the Philosopher's Stone | Minerva McGonagall | |
| 2001 | Gosford Park | Constance Trentham | |
| 2002 | Divine Secrets of the Ya-Ya Sisterhood | Caro Eliza Bennett | |
| 2002 | Harry Potter and the Chamber of Secrets | Minerva McGonagall | |
| 2004 | Harry Potter and the Prisoner of Azkaban | Minerva McGonagall | |
| 2004 | Ladies in Lavender | Janet Widdington | |
| 2005 | Harry Potter and the Goblet of Fire | Minerva McGonagall | |
| 2005 | Keeping Mum | Grace Hawkins | |
| 2007 | Becoming Jane | Lady Gresham | |
| 2007 | Harry Potter and the Order of the Phoenix | Minerva McGonagall | |
| 2009 | Harry Potter and the Half-Blood Prince | Minerva McGonagall | |
| 2009 | From Time to Time | Linnet Oldknow | |
| 2010 | Nanny McPhee and the Big Bang | Agatha Docherty | Also known as Nanny McPhee Returns |
| 2011 | Gnomeo & Juliet | Lady Bluebury | Voice |
| 2011 | Harry Potter and the Deathly Hallows – Part 2 | Minerva McGonagall | |
| 2012 | The Best Exotic Marigold Hotel | Muriel Donnelly | |
| 2012 | Quartet | Jean Horton | |
| 2014 | My Old Lady | Mathilde Girard | |
| 2015 | The Second Best Exotic Marigold Hotel | Muriel Donnelly | |
| 2015 | The Lady in the Van | Miss Shepherd | |
| 2018 | Sherlock Gnomes | Lady Bluebury | Voice |
| 2018 | Nothing Like a Dame | Herself | Documentary |
| 2019 | Downton Abbey | Violet Crawley, Dowager Countess of Grantham | |
| 2021 | A Boy Called Christmas | Aunt Ruth | |
| 2022 | Downton Abbey: A New Era | Violet Crawley, Dowager Countess of Grantham | |
| 2023 | The Miracle Club | Lily Fox | |

Source: Turner Classic Movies

=== Television ===
| Year | Title | Role | Notes |
|---|---|---|---|
| 1955 | BBC Sunday-Night Theatre | Performer | Episode: "The Makepeace Story #3: Family Business" |
| 1956 | Theatre Royal | Paula Benson | Episode: "Death Under the City" |
| 1956 | The Adventures of Aggie | Fiona Frobisher-Smith | Episode: "Cobalt Blue" |
| 1957 | Sing for Your Supper | Ann Carter | Television film |
| 1957 | Kraft Television Theatre | Performer | Episode: "Night of the Plague" |
| 1957 | ITV Play of the Week | Various roles | 6 episodes: 1957–1960 |
| 1957 | On Stage – London | Performer | Episode: "Episode #1.3" |
| 1958 | Armchair Theatre | Julie, The Girl, Anna Carnot | 3 episodes: 1958–1960 |
| 1959 | ITV Television Playhouse | Doto, Elaine | 2 episodes |
| 1966 | ITV Play of the Week | Victoria | Episode: "Home and Beauty" |
| 1967 | Much Ado About Nothing | Beatrice | Television film |
| 1968 | Play of the Month | Ann Whitefield | Episode: "Man and Superman" |
| 1968 | ITV Playhouse | Mrs Wislack | Episode: "On Approval" |
| 1972 | Play of the Month | Portia | Episode: "The Merchant of Venice" |
| 1972 | Play of the Month | Epifania | Episode: "The Millionairess" |
| 1974–75 | The Carol Burnett Show | Various roles | American TV debut; 3 episodes |
| 1983 | All for Love | Mrs Silly | Episode: "Mrs Silly" |
| 1988 | Talking Heads | Susan | Episode: "A Bed Among the Lentils" |
| 1992 | Screen Two | Mrs Mabel Pettigrew | Episode: "Memento Mori" |
| 1993 | Great Performances | Violet Venable | Episode: "Suddenly, Last Summer" |
| 1999 | All the King's Men | Queen Alexandra | Television film, BBC |
| 1999 | David Copperfield | Betsey Trotwood | Miniseries – 2 episodes |
| 2003 | My House in Umbria | Emily Delahunty | Television film, HBO |
| 2007 | Capturing Mary | Mary Gilbert | Television film, HBO |
| 2010–15 | Downton Abbey | Violet Crawley, Dowager Countess of Grantham | Series – 52 episodes |
| 2014 | National Theatre Live: 50 Years On Stage | Mrs Sullen | Television special, PBS |

=== Theatre ===
| Year | Title | Role | Venue |
|---|---|---|---|
| 1952 | Twelfth Night | Viola | Oxford Playhouse |
| 1952 | He Who Gets Slapped | Performer | Clarendon Press |
| 1952 | Cinderella | Performer | Oxford Playhouse |
| 1953 | Rookery Nook | Performer | Oxford Playhouse |
| 1953 | Housemaster | Performer | Oxford Playhouse |
| 1953 | Cakes and Ale | Performer | revue, Edinburgh Festival |
| 1953 | The Love of Four Colonels | Performer | Oxford Playhouse |
| 1954 | The Ortolan | Performer | Maxton Hall |
| 1954 | Don't Listen Ladies | Performer | Oxford Playhouse |
| 1954 | The Government Inspector | Performer | Oxford Playhouse |
| 1954 | The Letter | Performer | Oxford Playhouse |
| 1954 | A Man About The House | Performer | Oxford Playhouse |
| 1954 | On the Mile | Performer | revue, Edinburgh Festival |
| 1954 | Oxford Accents | Performer | Watergate Theatre, London |
| 1954 | Theatre 1900 | Performer | Oxford Playhouse |
| 1954 | Listen to the Wind | Performer | Oxford Playhouse |
| 1955 | The Magistrate | Performer | Oxford Playhouse |
| 1955 | The School for Scandal | Performer | Oxford Playhouse |
| 1956 | New Faces of '56 | Various roles | Ethel Barrymore Theatre, Broadway |
| 1957 | Share My Lettuce | Performer | Lyric Theatre; Comedy Theatre; Garrick Theatre |
| 1958 | The Stepmother | Vera Dane | St. Martin's Theatre |
| 1959 | The Double Dealer | Lady Plyant | The Old Vic |
| 1959 | As You Like It | Celia | The Old Vic |
| 1959 | Richard II | The Queen | The Old Vic |
| 1959 | The Merry Wives of Windsor | Mistress Ford | The Old Vic |
| 1960 | What Every Woman Knows | Maggie Wylie | The Old Vic |
| 1960 | Rhinoceros | Daisy | Strand Theatre |
| 1960 | Strip the Willow | Performer | UK tour |
| 1961 | The Rehearsal | Lucile | Bristol Old Vic; Globe Theatre; Queen's Theatre |
| 1962 | The Private Ear & The Public Eye | Belinda/Doreen | Globe Theatre |
| 1963 | Mary, Mary | Mary | Queen's Theatre |
| 1963 | The Recruiting Officer | Silvia | National Theatre |
| 1964 | Othello | Desdemona | National Theatre |
| 1964 | The Master Builder | Hilda Wangel | National Theatre |
| 1964 | Hay Fever | Myra Arundel | National Theatre |
| 1965 | Much Ado About Nothing | Beatrice | National Theatre |
| 1965 | Trelawny of the "Wells" | Avonia Bunn | National Theatre |
| 1966 | Miss Julie | Miss Julie | National Theatre |
| 1966 | Black Comedy | Clea | National Theatre |
| 1966 | A Bond Honoured | Marcela | National Theatre |
| 1969 | The Country Wife | Margery Pinchwife | Chichester Festival Theatre |
| 1970 | The Beaux' Stratagem | Mrs Sullen | National Theatre; Ahmanson Theatre; The Old Vic |
| 1970 | Hedda Gabler | Hedda Tesman | National Theatre; Cambridge Theatre; The Old Vic |
| 1970 | Three Sisters | Masha | Ahmanson Theatre |
| 1971 | Design for Living | Gilda | Ahmanson Theatre |
| 1972 | Private Lives | Amanda Prynne | Queen's Theatre |
| 1973 | Peter Pan | Peter Pan | London Coliseum |
| 1974 | Snap | Connie Hudson | Vaudeville Theatre |
| 1975 | Private Lives | Amanda Prynne | US tour and 46th Street Theatre |
| 1976 | The Way of the World | Millamant | Stratford Shakespeare Festival |
| 1976 | Antony and Cleopatra | Cleopatra | Stratford Shakespeare Festival |
| 1976 | Three Sisters | Masha | Stratford Shakespeare Festival |
| 1976 | Measure for Measure | Mistress Overdone | Stratford Shakespeare Festival |
| 1976 | The Guardsman | The Actress | Stratford Shakespeare Festival/Ahmanson |
| 1977 | A Midsummer Night's Dream | Titania/Hippolyta | Stratford Shakespeare Festival/Ahmanson |
| 1977 | Richard III | Queen Elizabeth | Stratford Shakespeare Festival |
| 1977 | As You Like It | Rosalind | Stratford Shakespeare Festival |
| 1977 | Hay Fever | Judith Bliss | Stratford Shakespeare Festival |
| 1978 | Macbeth | Lady Macbeth | Stratford Shakespeare Festival |
| 1978 | Private Lives | Amanda Prynne | Stratford Shakespeare Festival |
| 1979 | Night and Day | Ruth Carson | Phoenix Theatre; ANTA Playhouse, Broadway |
| 1980 | Much Ado About Nothing | Beatrice | Stratford Shakespeare Festival |
| 1980 | The Seagull | Arkadina | Stratford Shakespeare Festival |
| 1980 | Virginia | Virginia Woolf | SSF/Haymarket Theatre |
| 1984 | The Way of the World | Millamant | Chichester/Haymarket Theatre |
| 1985 | Interpreters | Nadia Ogilvy-Smith | Queen's Theatre |
| 1986 | The Infernal Machine | Jocasta | Lyric Theatre |
| 1987 | Coming into Land | Halina Rodziewiczowna | Royal National Theatre; Lyttelton Theatre |
| 1987 | Lettice and Lovage | Lettice Doucett | Globe Theatre |
| 1990 | Lettice and Lovage | Lettice Doucett | Ethel Barrymore Theatre, Broadway |
| 1993 | The Importance of Being Earnest | Lady Bracknell | Aldwych Theatre |
| 1994 | Three Tall Women | A | Wyndham's Theatre |
| 1996 | Talking Heads | Susan | Chichester/Comedy Theatre |
| 1997 | A Delicate Balance | Claire | Haymarket Theatre |
| 1999 | The Lady in the Van | Miss Mary Shepherd | Queen's Theatre |
| 2002 | The Breath of Life | Madeleiane Palmer | Haymarket Theatre |
| 2004 | Talking Heads | Susan | Australia/New Zealand tour |
| 2007 | The Lady from Dubuque | Elizabeth | Haymarket Theatre |
| 2019 | A German Life | Brunhilde Pomsel | Bridge Theatre |

=== Audio recording ===
| Year | Title | Role | Notes |
|---|---|---|---|
| 1957 | Share my Lettuce | Orange | Original London cast recording, Nixa 18011 plum label LP, 1957. |
| 1968 | Mary Poppins | Mary Poppins | Dramatised reading with cast from Travers' books. Fontana Special, SFL 14098 LP. |

=== Video games ===
| Year | Title | Role | Notes |
|---|---|---|---|
| 2018 | Harry Potter: Hogwarts Mystery | Minerva McGonagall | Voice |

== See also ==
- List of awards and nominations received by Maggie Smith
