= Anthony Powell (designer) =

English costume designer (1935–2021)

- Born: 2 June 1935; Chorlton-cum-Hardy, Manchester, England
- Died: 16 April 2021 (aged 85); London, England
- Occupation: Costume designer
- Awards: Academy Award, BAFTA Award, Tony Award, César Award

Anthony Powell (2 June 1935 – 16 April 2021) was an English costume designer for film and stage. He won three Academy Awards, for Travels with My Aunt (1972), Death on the Nile (1978) and Tess (1979).

== Biography ==
Powell was born in Chorlton-cum-Hardy in June 1935, and is not related to fellow costume designer Sandy Powell as Sandy Powell herself told fashion journalist Suzy Menkes on an episode of Menkes' podcast "Creative Conversations" (5 April 2023). Raised in Yorkshire and Dublin, Powell began his professional career as a teenager touring with his handmade marionettes. While serving as a wireless operator in the military, he mistakenly led the British Army of the Occupation in Germany into the Russian zone. After graduating from the Central School of Art and Design in London, he was apprenticed as an assistant to designers including Oliver Messel and Cecil Beaton.

Simultaneously, Powell served as a lecturer at his alma mater. His costume designs for John Gielgud's production of The School for Scandal (1963) earned him a Tony Award, and he received a second nomination for his scenic design. He was consulted as a designer for men's sportswear as well as worked as a design consultant for hotels and restaurants. He assisted in the restoration and renovation of Sutton Place, Guildford during the 1960s and 1970s.

Powell made his first Hollywood connection with director Irving Lerner who chose him to design the costumes for The Royal Hunt of the Sun (1969), which required styling both the Spanish conquistadors as well as the Native Americans. His first Oscar came for his outlandish designs for Maggie Smith's Augusta in George Cukor's Travels with My Aunt (1972). Powell returned to Broadway as set designer for a revival of Noël Coward's Private Lives and Peter Shaffer's Lettice and Lovage, both starring Maggie Smith.

The academy honored him with Oscars for his glamorous 1930s designs for Death on the Nile (1978), and his 19th-century attire for Tess (1979). The latter began a long-term collaboration with director Roman Polanski that included the lavish Pirates (1986), and the contemporary Frantic (1988). Additionally, Powell created the costumes and sets for the French stage production of Amadeus, in which Polanski starred as well as directed.

Powell also forged a collaboration with director Steven Spielberg, creating the period-appropriate costumes for both Indiana Jones and the Temple of Doom (1984) and Indiana Jones and the Last Crusade (1989). Powell had spent the better part of two years working closely with David Lean on the director's film project of Nostromo; however the project was halted due to Lean's death. In 1991, he designed the fantastic clothing for Hook, some of which recalled his earlier work for Pirates.

Returning to the stage, his lavish and luxuriant costumes for Norma Desmond in Andrew Lloyd Webber's musical Sunset Boulevard (1993 in London; 1994 in the USA), based on the movie, earned him another Tony Award. Glenn Close headed the American production so Powell created the over-the-top costumes for her Cruella de Vil in the live action remake of 101 Dalmatians (1996) and its sequel 102 Dalmatians (2000), for which he received another Best Costume Design Academy Award nomination. He also reinterpreted 1960s mod fashions for the film version of The Avengers (1998).

In 2004, Anthony Powell designed the costumes for Richard Strauss's opera Capriccio for the Paris Opera at the Palais Garnier, starring Renée Fleming, and directed by Robert Carsen. He collaborated again with Robert Carsen in 2010 for the costumes of My Fair Lady at the Théâtre du Châtelet in Paris. This production also travelled to the Mariinsky Theatre in St Petersburg where it was the first musical comedy to be presented on this stage. This production was revived again in Paris in 2012.

Powell died at a care facility in London on 16 April 2021, aged 85.

== Credits ==
=== Film ===
Year	Film	Notes
1964	Festival (TV series) – "The Comedy of Errors"	
1969	The Royal Hunt of the Sun	
1972	Travels with My Aunt	Won the Academy Award for Best Costume Design
1973	Papillon	
1975	That Lucky Touch	
1976	Buffalo Bill and the Indians, or Sitting Bull's History Lesson	
1977	Sorcerer	
1978	Death on the Nile (costumes designed by)	Won the Academy Award for Best Costume Design; Won the BAFTA for Best Costume Design
1979	Tess	Won the Academy Award for Best Costume Design; Nominated for the BAFTA for Best Costume Design
1981	Priest of Love	
1982	Evil Under the Sun	
1984	Indiana Jones and the Temple of Doom	Nominated Saturn Award for Best Costume Design
1986	Pirates	Won César Award for Best Costume Design; Nominated for the Academy Award for Best Costume Design
1987	Ishtar	
1988	Frantic	
1989	Indiana Jones and the Last Crusade	Nominated Saturn Award for Best Costume Design
1991	Hook	Nominated Academy Award for Best Costume Design
1996	101 Dalmatians	
1998	The Avengers	
1999	The Ninth Gate	
2000	102 Dalmatians	Nominated Academy Award for Best Costume Design
2006	Miss Potter	

=== Theatre ===
Year	Production	Notes
1962	Women Beware Women	
1962	The Comedy of Errors	
1963	The School for Scandal	Won Tony Award for Best Costume Design Nominated Tony Award for Best Scenic Design
1975	Private Lives	
1981	Amadeus	
1990	Lettice and Lovage	
1992	Hay Fever	Nominated Olivier Award for Best Costume Design
1993	Trelawny of the 'Wells'	Nominated Olivier Award for Best Costume Design
1993	Sunset Boulevard	
1994	Sunset Boulevard	Nominated Tony Award for Best Costume Design
2001	The Adventures of Tom Sawyer	Nominated Drama Desk Award for Outstanding Costume Design
2002	Anything Goes	
2004	Capriccio	
2010	My Fair Lady	This production was revived again in Paris in 2012
2015	Singin' in the Rain	

== Awards ==
- Academy Award for Best Costume Design – 1973, 1979, 1981
- BAFTA Award for Best Costume Design – 1979
- César Award for Best Costume Design (Meilleurs costumes=Best costumes) – 1987
- Costume Designers Guild Career Achievement Award – 2000
- Tony Award for Best Costume Design – 1963
