= The Critics' Circle =

The Critics' Circle logo

The Critics' Circle is the national professional body of British critics for literature, theatre, drama, film, music, dance, visual arts and architecture. It was established in 1913 as a successor to the defunct Society of Dramatic Critics, formed in 1906. The association is analogous to the 1974 American Theatre Critics Association, but broader in scope.

== Awards ==
The Critics’ Circle Awards are claimed to be unique, decided by the country’s most experienced professional arts journalists and critics on the basis of hearing the widest range of performances across the UK and Ireland.

=== Theatre and film ===
For many years the Circle gave no awards. In 1980 the members of the Film Section, known also as the London Film Critics' Circle, established the Critics' Circle Film Awards to acknowledge special achievements in the cinema. In 1989 the Drama section organized the first of its Critics' Circle Theatre Awards ceremonies.

=== Dance, Visual Arts, Architecture ===
Presentation of Dance awards commenced in 2002, followed from 2011 with annual awards by the Music and the Visual Arts and Architecture sections.

=== Music ===
The Music Section of The Critics’ Circle comprises 90 of the country’s most respected critics and music journalists. Membership of the Circle is by invitation.

- Annual Young Talent Awards recognise emerging talent across the country
- The Outstanding Achievement in Opera Award celebrates the achievement of British opera companies.

=== Service to the arts ===
Since 1988 the Circle has presented the Critics' Circle Award for Distinguished Service to the Arts, voted for by all members of the Circle. The award takes the form of an engraved crystal rose bowl presented at a celebratory luncheon which, in recent years, has been held at the Royal National Theatre.
