= Travels with My Aunt (film) =

1972 film based on the 1969 novel

- Theatrical release poster
- Directed by: George Cukor
- Written by: Jay Presson Allen; Hugh Wheeler
- Based on: Travels with My Aunt; 1969 novel by Graham Greene
- Produced by: James Cresson; Robert Fryer
- Starring: Maggie Smith; Alec McCowen; Louis Gossett Jr.; Robert Stephens; Cindy Williams; Robert Flemyng; José Luis López Vázquez
- Cinematography: Douglas Slocombe
- Edited by: John Bloom
- Music by: Tony Hatch
- Distributed by: Metro-Goldwyn-Mayer
- Release date: December 17, 1972
- Running time: 109 minutes
- Country: United States
- Language: English
- Budget: $3.2 million
- Box office: $1,075,000 (US/Canada theatrical rentals)

Travels with My Aunt is a 1972 American comedy film directed by George Cukor, written by Jay Presson Allen and Hugh Wheeler, and starring Maggie Smith. The film is loosely based on the 1969 novel of the same name by Graham Greene. The film's plot retains the book's central theme of the adventurous, amoral aunt and her respectable middle class nephew drawn in to share her life, and also features her various past and present lovers who were introduced in the book, while providing this cast of characters with different adventures to the ones thought up by Greene, in different locales (North Africa rather than the book's South America). It was released on December 17, 1972.

== Plot ==
After his mother's funeral at Islington Cemetery, while waiting for her ashes, London bank manager Henry Pulling meets eccentric Augusta Bertram, a woman who claims to be his aunt and announces that the woman who raised him was not his biological mother. She invites him back to her apartment, where her lover, an African fortune teller named Zachary Wordsworth, is waiting for her. Shortly after, she receives a package allegedly containing the severed finger of her true love, Ercole Visconti, with a note promising the two will be reunited upon payment of $100,000.

Augusta asks Henry to accompany her to Paris, and he agrees, unaware she actually is smuggling £50,000 out of England and transporting it to Turkey for a gangster named Crowder in exchange for a £10,000 fee she can put toward the ransom. The two board the Orient Express, where Henry meets Tooley, a young American hippie who takes a liking to him and gets him to smoke marijuana with her in her compartment. When the train reaches Milan, Augusta is greeted at the station by Visconti's son Mario, who presents her with a bouquet of flowers and an ear that supposedly belongs to Visconti.

When they arrive at the Turkish border, officials confiscate the money Augusta is carrying and send her and Henry back to Paris. Augusta attempts to secure the money she needs from her former lover Achille Dambreuse, but the wealthy Frenchman dies of a heart attack in her hotel suite. Efforts to extort 1 million francs from Dambreuse's widow in return for their silence about the circumstances of his death fail. Augusta takes a portrait of herself she claims was painted by Amedeo Modigliani from Dambreuse's home, which she plans to sell to raise the money.

After a furious argument with Henry, Augusta lets slip that he is Visconti's "other son". Once the painting is sold to Crowder, they join Wordsworth on a fishing boat to North Africa, where they pay the ransom and are reunited with Visconti. He removes his bandages, revealing ear and finger intact, indicating he has been the mastermind of a plot to separate Augusta from her money. After Visconti and his collaborators take the boat and leave, Henry reveals that he deduced Augusta is his biological mother and that, suspicious of Visconti from the start, he and Wordsworth exchanged "neatly cut pages of the Barcelona telephone directory" for the money in the package they delivered. He wants to use the cash he kept to purchase back the portrait of Augusta, but she tells him she would prefer to use it to finance more travels. Henry decides the matter should be decided with the toss of a coin and chooses 'heads'. Wordsworth tosses the coin, and the film ends on a freeze frame shot of Augusta, Henry and Wordsworth as they await the fall of the coin.

== Cast ==
- Maggie Smith as Augusta Bertram
- Alec McCowen as Henry Pulling
- Louis Gossett Jr. as Zachary Wordsworth
- Robert Stephens as Ercole Visconti
- Cindy Williams as Tooley
- Robert Flemyng as Crowder
- José Luis López Vázquez as Achille Dambreuse
- Corinne Marchand as Louise
- Valerie White as Mme. Dambreuse

== Production ==
George Cukor initially gave Katharine Hepburn a copy of the Graham Greene novel and told her he wanted to cast her as Augusta. Upon first reading the book, basically a collection of anecdotes, she felt it could not be adapted into a viable screenplay, but after reading it several more times she agreed to make the film. She was ultimately unhappy with the completed script, and Jay Presson Allen finally suggested she rewrite the screenplay herself.

After working on it for months, Hepburn submitted it to Metro-Goldwyn-Mayer, but studio head James T. Aubrey Jr. felt it was missing the charm of the book. Additionally, he wanted Augusta to be seen as a younger woman in flashbacks, and he felt Hepburn was too old to do so convincingly. In a phone call to the actress, he told her the project was being postponed, but the next day, her agent was advised she was being given notice for refusing to report to work. Hepburn was outraged and considered suing MGM for payment for her contributions to the screenplay, but finally decided against taking legal action. Allen later said only one speech of hers remained in the completed film, but Hepburn was denied screen credit because she was not a member of the Writers Guild of America.

The film was shot on location in England, France, Italy, Morocco, Spain, Turkey and Yugoslavia, with the final scenes shot at Cabo de Gata natural park and Los Genoveses Beach. "Serenade of Love," the film's theme song, was written by Jackie Trent and Tony Hatch and recorded by Petula Clark. Costume designer Anthony Powell became a close friend of Maggie Smith and dressed her for her later films Death on the Nile, Evil Under the Sun, and Hook as well as the plays Private Lives and Lettice and Lovage.

== Critical reception ==
Roger Greenspun of The New York Times said the film's "great charm" lies in

the surprising emotional complexity it manages in terms of its light tone and its nutty, endlessly involved plotting. Such emotional complexity depends a good deal on richness of characterization and delicacy of human contact, and in this the film sometimes succeeds and sometimes doesn't. Alec McCowen does marvelous things as Henry ... Maggie Smith, playing a woman twice her age, seems to have surrounded her character rather than to have inhabited it ... and she is energetic enough for any five ordinary performers. But it is the energy of caricature rather than personality, and Aunt Augusta is sufficiently an original not to need any eccentricities added on. But the film is full of privileged moments, lucid, controlled and graceful, and any of them might serve to epitomize the style and the meaning of the valuable cinema of George Cukor.

Roger Ebert of the Chicago Sun-Times called the film "a whimsical romantic fantasy that works; which is to say, if you are not a fan of whimsical romantic fantasy, it's going to be too much for you." He added "It was nearly too much for me – I found myself wincing from time to time when one of the movie's ornate props seemed about to bean me – but in the end I was won over, I guess."

TV Guide rated it three out of four stars and wrote:

Condensing Greene's novel into a workable screenplay was not entirely successful. Some moments are glossed over; others fly by all too rapidly in a valiant attempt to cram in as much of the book as possible within the 109-minute running time. Though it doesn't always succeed, the spirit is there often enough to cover the rapid-fire plot development. Cukor gives this a sort of tongue-in-cheek direction; at this point in his career his heyday was long past, and the film is no match for some of his earlier successes. Like its central character, it is unusual, unexpected, and not entirely what it projects itself to be, yet it is entertaining.

== Home media ==
The VHS of Travels with My Aunt was released March 26, 1996. An official DVD release came on October 4, 2011, when the film was added to the Warner Archive Collection.

== Awards and nominations ==
- Academy Award for Best Actress (Maggie Smith, nominee)
- Academy Award for Best Art Direction-Set Decoration (John Box, Gil Parrondo, and Robert W. Laing, nominees)
- Academy Award for Best Cinematography (Douglas Slocombe, nominee)
- Academy Award for Best Costume Design (Anthony Powell, winner)
- BAFTA Award for Best Cinematography (Slocombe, nominee)
- Edgar Allan Poe Award for Best Motion Picture Screenplay (Jay Presson Allen and Hugh Wheeler, nominees)
- Golden Globe Award for Best Motion Picture – Musical or Comedy (nominee)
- Golden Globe Award for Best Actress – Motion Picture Musical or Comedy (Smith, nominee)
- Golden Globe Award for Best Supporting Actor – Motion Picture (Alec McCowan, nominee)
- Writers Guild of America Award for Best Adapted Screenplay (Allen and Wheeler, nominees)
