= Lily in Love =

- DVD cover
- Directed by: Károly Makk
- Written by: Frank Cucci; Ferenc Molnár (play)
- Produced by: Robert Halmi
- Starring: Christopher Plummer; Maggie Smith; Elke Sommer
- Cinematography: John Lindley
- Distributed by: New Line Cinema
- Release date: 1984
- Running time: 90 minutes
- Countries: Hungary; United States
- Languages: Hungarian; English

Lily in Love (alternative English title: Playing for Keeps, Hungarian title: Játszani kell) is a 1984 film starring Christopher Plummer, Maggie Smith and Elke Sommer and directed by Károly Makk. An English-language co-production between the United States and Hungary, the film is a cinematic adaptation of Ferenc Molnár's play about comedic deception and romance, Testőr.

== Plot ==
Fitz Wynn, a talented but overly satisfied stage actor, wants to star in a new movie that is written by his wife, Lily.

She does not feel her Fitz is right for the part, and explains to him why and what she is looking for in the role. Fitz proceeds to orchestrate his own transformation into Roberto Terranova, a blonde Italian who seems to be exactly what Lily wants.

== Cast ==
- Christopher Plummer as Fitzroy Wynn / Roberto Terranova
- Maggie Smith as Lily Wynn
- Elke Sommer as Alicia
- Adolph Green as Jerry Silber
- Rosetta LeNoire as Rosanna

== See also ==
- The Guardsman (1931)
- The Chocolate Soldier (1941)
