= Critics' Circle Award for Distinguished Service to the Arts =

- Awarded for: Distinguished Service to the Arts
- Country: United Kingdom
- Reward: An engraved crystal rose bowl
- Established: The Critics' Circle
- First award: 1988
- Currently held by: Tilda Swinton (2024)
- Website: criticscircle.org.uk/awards/

Each year since 1988 The Critics' Circle has presented an award for Distinguished Service to the Arts, voted for by all members of the Circle, embracing Dance, Drama, Film, Music, Visual Arts and Architecture. This performing arts Award takes the form of an engraved crystal rose bowl, presented at a celebratory luncheon. Thus the award is also known colloquially as The Rose Bowl Award.

Sir Peter Hall was the first recipient of the award in 1988. Traditionally, only one award to one individual is given out each year. However, in 2014, to mark the Critics' Circle's centenary, five awards were given out to five individuals, Sir Nicholas Serota, Sir Peter Wright, Sir Colin Davis, Max Stafford-Clark and Danny Boyle.

== Recipients ==
- 1988 Sir Peter Hall
- 1989 Dame Ninette de Valois
- 1990 Sir Michael Tippett
- 1991 Sir David Lean
- 1992 Sir John Mills
- 1993 Sir Peter Ustinov
- 1994 Sir John Drummond
- 1995 Sir Peter Wright
- 1996 Sir Richard Eyre
- 1997 Dame Judi Dench
- 1998 Sir Edward Downes
- 1999 Harold Pinter
- 2000 Dame Alicia Markova
- 2001 Paul Scofield
- 2002 Alfred Brendel
- 2003 Sir Ian McKellen
- 2004 Mike Leigh
- 2005 Alan Bennett
- 2006 Dame Helen Mirren
- 2007 Sir Tom Stoppard
- 2008 Peter Brook
- 2009 Sir Alan Ayckbourn
- 2010 Ken Loach
- 2011 Stephen Sondheim
- 2012 Sir Nicholas Serota, Sir Peter Wright, Sir Colin Davis, Max Stafford-Clark and Danny Boyle
- 2013 Sir Grayson Perry
- 2014 Sir Nicholas Hytner
- 2015 Dame Maggie Smith
- 2016 Sir Matthew Bourne
- 2017 David Hockney
- 2018 Carlos Acosta
- 2019 Dame Janet Baker
- 2020 Michael Frayn
- 2021 Dame Emma Thompson
- 2022 Daniel Barenboim
- 2023 Sir Derek Jacobi
- 2024 Tilda Swinton
