= Child in the House =

1956 British film by Cy Endfield

- Theatrical release poster
- Directed by: Cy Endfield
- Screenplay by: Cy Endfield
- Based on: A Child in the House by Janet McNeill
- Produced by: Benjamin Fisz
- Starring: Phyllis Calvert; Eric Portman; Stanley Baker
- Cinematography: Otto Heller
- Edited by: Charles Hasse
- Music by: Mario Nascimbene
- Production companies: Laureate; Golden Era Film Distributors
- Distributed by: Eros Films (UK)
- Release dates: 14 August 1956 (London, UK)
- Running time: 90 minutes
- Country: United Kingdom
- Language: English

Child in the House is a 1956 British drama film directed and written by Cy Endfield and starring Phyllis Calvert, Eric Portman and Stanley Baker. It is based on the 1955 novel A Child in the House by Janet McNeill. A girl struggles to cope with her uncaring relatives.

== Plot ==
Elizabeth Lorimer is an 11-year-old girl being temporarily looked after by her wealthy aunt and uncle. Her mother is in hospital and her criminal father Stephen is allegedly out of the country, but is in fact hiding in London on the run from the police. Stephen secretly meets with Elizabeth, making her promise not to tell anyone where he is. Elizabeth is tricked by her aunt into revealing Stephen's location, and he gives himself up.

== Cast ==
- Phyllis Calvert as Evelyn Acheson
- Eric Portman as Henry Acheson
- Stanley Baker as Stephen Lorimer
- Mandy Miller as Elizabeth Lorimer
- Dora Bryan as Cassie
- Joan Hickson as Cook
- Victor Maddern as Bert
- Percy Herbert as Detective Sergeant Taylor
- Joan Benham as Vera McNally
- Martin Miller as Professor Topolski
- Christopher Toyne as Peter McNally
- Molly Urquhart as Mrs Parsons
- Bruce Beeby as Constable Jennings
- Peter Burton as Howard Forbes
- Maggie Smith as party guest (screen debut, uncredited)
- Alfie Bass as ticket collector

== Production ==
It was the first of several collaborations between Stanley Baker and Cy Endfield.

== Critical reception ==
Kine Weekly said "Polished an appealing domestric melodrama, set in Belgravia. The distinguished adult players admirably support the young star, the dialogue is crisp and the staging impressive. ... The picture contains much more than that which meets the eye, but neither its child nor its feminine psychology is permitted to soar above the masses' heads."

Variety said "With a minium of dialog, Mandy [Miller] arouses sympathy for the forlorn defiant child. Phyllis Calvert subtly conveys the underlying malice behind the aunt's apparent solitide. Eric Portman is wasted as her husband, with little to do but offer frigid politeness to his wife, and mute alliance with the youngster. Stanley Baker makes a mixed personality of the crooked father, his characterization being more realistic in the later reels when he is on the run. Dora Bryan brings a breath of cockney joyousness to the role of the sympathetic housemaid, livening the otherwise stilted atmosphere."

In British Sound Films: The Studio Years 1928–1959 David Quinlan rated the film as "average", writing: "Standard weepie with stars uneasily cast."

Leslie Halliwell said: "Modest family drama of the novelette type in which adult problems are put right by the wisdom of a child."

TV Guide called the film a "calculated tearjerker".

The Radio Times wrote "good for a tear or two, though Portman and Calvert are rather oddly cast."
