= All for Love (British TV series) =

- Genre: Drama
- Country of origin: United Kingdom
- Original language: English
- No. of series: 2
- No. of episodes: 12

Production
- Production company: Granada Television

Original release
- Release: 25 July 1982 – 9 October 1983

All For Love is a Granada television production consisting of adaptations of short stories by authors such as Rumer Godden, Elizabeth Taylor, and William Trevor. The series presents 12 unrelated episodes all concerning various types of human love.

Four episodes from the series were broadcast in the US on PBS as part of their Masterpiece Theatre series. They were Mona, L'Elegance, A Bit of Singing and Dancing, and Letting the Birds Go Free.

== Episodes ==
No.	Title	Directed by	Story/Screenplay	Original release date
1	"A Dedicated Man"	Robert Knights	Elizabeth Taylor (short story)/Hugh Whitemore (screenplay)	25 July 1982
A waitress agrees to pose as the wife of a fellow waiter in order for him to obtain a better position. As his past emerges, things go downhill. Starring Joan Plowright, Alec McCowen, Peter Martin, Aimée Delamain and Graham Rigby.
2	"Mona"	Robert Knights	Francis King (short story)/Thomas Ellice (screenplay)	1 August 1982
Set after the First World War, a young girl takes care of an ex-soldier suffering from the effects of being gassed. No one around her approves of her involvement. Starring Frank Finlay and Deborah Stokes.
3	"L’Elegance"	Jack Gold	Rumer Godden (short story)/Lee Langley (screenplay)	8 August 1982
Using her favorite fashion magazine as a guide, a lonely shop woman takes luxury vacations in France in her attempt to pass as a wealthy woman. Starring Geraldine McEwan, Brigitte Kahn, Thomasine Heiner, Lawrence Davidson, André Maranne, Claude Le Saché and Neville Barber.
4	"Combat"	Brian Mills	Thomas Ellice (screenplay)	15 August 1982
A persistent and opinionated mother attempts to find a wife for her son whom she fails to recognize is a homosexual. Starring Joyce Redman, Rupert Frazer and Nigel Havers. Released as TV Movie A Different Kind of Love on 28 February 1985 in the USA.
5	"A Bit of Singing and Dancing"	Robert Knights	Susan Hill (short story)/Hugh Whitemore (screenplay)	22 August 1982
When her mother dies, spinster Esme Fanshow takes in the seemingly proper Mr. Curry as a boarder. Her mother's ghost warns her to mistrust the rather mysterious gentleman.
6	"Lovers of Their Time"	Unknown	William Trevor (short story)/Hugh Whitemore (screenplay)	29 August 1982
An unhappily married man begins an affair with a young shopgirl. The realities of the situation finally come to bear. Starring Edward Petherbridge, Cheryl Prime, Lynn Farleigh and Rhoda Lewis.
7	"Down at the Hydro"	John Irvin	William Samsom (short story)/Hugh Whitemore (screenplay)	4 September 1983
Looking for rest and exercise, Colonel Hunt enters a health spa. There he meets Mrs. Mackay. Starring Jean Simmons and Ian Carmichael.
8	"Miss A. and Miss M."	Robert Knights	Elizabeth Taylor (short story)/Stephen Wakelam (screenplay)	11 September 1983
While staying in a guesthouse with her mother, a young girl becomes taken with Miss Alliott who shares a nearby cottage with Miss Martin.
9	"Mrs. Silly"	James Cellan Jones	William Trevor (short story)/Bob Larbey (screenplay)	18 September 1983
A young boy sees his divorced mother as embarrassing while she seeks his affections. At the same time he sees his father in a stable relationship. Starring Maggie Smith, Michael Culver, James Villiers, Jo Kendall and Cyril Luckham.
10	"Letting the Birds Go Free"	Moira Armstrong	Philip Oakes (short story)/Stephen Wakelam (screenplay)	25 September 1983
A homeless young man is caught stealing eggs at a local farm. The father puts him to work where he meets his daughter.
11	"Fireworks for Elspeth"	Alvin Rakoff	Rumer Godden (short story)/Lee Langley (screenplay)	2 October 1983
A young woman prepares to enter a convent while contending with her merciless mother.
12	"To the Camp and Back"	John Glenister, Moira Armstrong (uncredited)	Francis King (short story)/Stephen Wakelam (screenplay)	9 October 1983
A young widow meets a German soldier from a nearby prisoner of war camp. She is conflicted as her late husband was killed in the war. Starring Phoebe Nicholls.

== Reception ==
John O'Connor of The New York Times reviewed the first episode, “A Dedicated Man” called the production "exquisite” and “turns out to be a quietly unsettling slice of British life. It provides a very impressive debut for the series.”.
