= Nothing Like a Dame (film) =

- Directed by: Roger Michell
- Produced by: Sally Angel; Karen Steyn
- Starring: Eileen Atkins; Judi Dench; Joan Plowright; Maggie Smith
- Cinematography: Eben Bolter
- Edited by: Joanna Crickmay
- Production companies: Field Day Films; BBC Arena; Kew Media Group
- Distributed by: Picturehouse Entertainment
- Release date: 2 May 2018 (United Kingdom)
- Running time: 84 minutes
- Country: United Kingdom
- Language: English
- Box office: $3,188,434

Nothing Like a Dame (released in the United States, Australia and New Zealand as Tea With the Dames) is a 2018 British documentary film directed by Roger Michell, with Sally Angel serving as executive producer. It was produced by Sally Angel and Karen Steyn with Maddy Allen as head of production. The film documents conversations between actresses Eileen Atkins, Judi Dench, Joan Plowright (in her last film appearance), and Maggie Smith (all of whom are Dames Commander of the Order of the British Empire) interspersed with scenes from their careers on film and stage.

== Production ==
Nothing Like a Dame was commissioned in 2016 in the United Kingdom by BBC Television for its long-running arts strand Arena, and made by Field Day Productions. It emerged from an existing relationship between Sally Angel and Joan Plowright, for whom she had previously filmed her one-woman show. Angel approached BBC Arts commissioning editor Mark Bell who suggested it to Anthony Wall at Arena. Wall explained that when writing to the other three Dames, "We proposed a film that would not be just talking heads and clips, but one with an 'informal structure, offering a relaxed and friendly atmosphere where memories, thoughts and insights could flow spontaneously among friends'." Roger Michell was then invited to direct.

== Release ==
International distribution was by Kew Media Group. It opened in eighteen territories between May 2018 and November 2019, including Australia, the United States, and at film festivals in Norway and Iceland.

Nothing Like a Dame received theatrical distribution in the United Kingdom from 2 May 2018 ahead of its television premiere on BBC Two on 2 June 2018. Its pre-watershed version was screened on 29 December 2018. It was also repeated by way of tribute to Roger Michell on 12 October 2021 and to Maggie Smith on 16 October 2024.

== Reception ==
Nothing Like a Dame received critical acclaim. On the review aggregator website Rotten Tomatoes, the film has a 98% approval rating, based on 88 reviews, with an average rating of 7.9/10. The website's consensus reads, "Tea with the Dames proves there's plenty of entertainment value to be found in rounding up a quartet of screen legends for a chat -- and is likely to leave audiences wishing these stars would keep brewing up pots for an ongoing series." On Metacritic, it received a score of 85 out of 100, based on 19 reviews.

Peter Bradshaw of The Guardian gave the film a five out of five star rating, declaring it an "outrageously funny film". Guy Lodge of Variety called the film a "richly enjoyable gabfest" but that the film was "hardly vital cinema".

Both Bradshaw and Lodge noted that they wished the film had covered a wider range of topics, such as Time's Up and the MeToo movements.

Writing for the New Statesman, Rachel Cooke said, "It was, perhaps, on the long side. Then again, its slow unfurling allowed us to imagine we were eavesdropping. Here was fame, but here, too, was intimacy. Subjects that were discussed: Shakespeare, then and now; husbands, the difficulty of working with; critics, the ghastliness of. Also, the vexed question of beauty. 'We are not in the first rank of beauties,' Plowright said to Atkins, sounding not unlike (a dead dame) Edith Evans – though whenever images of their younger selves flashed up, you begged to differ. Four such extraordinary faces, so sexy and animated."
