= Brunhilde Pomsel =

German broadcaster (1911–2017), personal secretary to Joseph Goebbels

- Pomsel, during World War II.
- Born: 11 January 1911; Berlin, German Empire
- Died: 27 January 2017 (aged 106); Munich, Germany
- Occupations: Stenographer, typist, secretary, broadcaster

Brunhilde Pomsel (11 January 1911 – 27 January 2017) was a personal secretary to Joseph Goebbels, the Reich Minister of Propaganda of Nazi Germany. She started work at the ministry's offices in the Ordenspalais opposite the Reich Chancellery in Berlin in 1942. In 2014, aged 103, she gave a series of interviews for a film documentary entitled A German Life. She told the interviewer, "It is absolutely not about clearing my conscience" and that "No one believes me now, but I knew nothing". The film was released in 2016 when she was 105 years old.

== Career ==
Pomsel was born in Berlin on 11 January 1911 and had three siblings. Her first two employers were Jews: first, a Jewish-owned clothing store where she worked as an assistant, then Dr. Hugo Goldberg, a lawyer and insurance agent. "I obviously didn't tell him that on January 30, 1933, I cheered Hitler at the Brandenburg Gate... You can’t do something like that to a poor Jew."

She claimed to have been "a stupid and politically disinterested nobody from a simple background" but in 1933, she voted for Hitler and joined the Nazi Party. She got a job in the news department of the government radio station. On the recommendation of a Nazi friend, she was transferred to the Reich Ministry of Public Enlightenment and Propaganda in 1942, where she worked under Joseph Goebbels as a stenographer until the end of the war. Goebbels's office at the Ordenspalais was opposite Hitler's Reich Chancellery.

According to Kate Connolly in the Guardian, she was more than just a secretary/stenographer; her tasks included "massaging downwards statistics about fallen soldiers, as well as exaggerating the number of rapes of German women by the Red Army". Pomsel herself explained that "the news that we received in the offices of Red Army atrocities was always multiplied. If three women were raped we would make it ten. Everything was exaggerated - in order to strengthen deterrent effect and the German peoples will to hold out".

== Imprisonment ==
At the end of the war in 1945, Pomsel hid in the Vorbunker, part of the subterranean bunker complex that housed Hitler and Eva Braun in the final days of the Nazi Germany. She was captured and imprisoned by the Soviet NKVD until 1950 in three different concentration camps: Buchenwald, Hohenschönhausen and Sachsenhausen. She was released from the NKVD camp in 1950, and escaped from the Soviet-occupied zone to West Germany, where she worked as a secretary with the state broadcaster Südwestfunk in Baden-Baden and then at ARD in Munich until her retirement in 1971.

== Later life ==
In 2005, Pomsel visited the Memorial to the Murdered Jews of Europe in Berlin and discovered that her Jewish school friend, Eva Löwenthal, had been sent to Auschwitz in November 1943, where she died. After shunning requests for interviews and requests to write her memoirs for over 60 years, she publicly spoke out against Goebbels on her 100th birthday in 2011. A 113-minute documentary called A German Life was drawn from a 30-hour interview with Pomsel, and it was shown at Filmfest München in 2016. An award-winning theatre play (monologue with Dame Maggie Smith) of the same name was performed at the Bridge Theatre in London in 2019.

Shortly before her death, Pomsel claimed she had been in love with a man named Gottfried Kirchbach, who had a Jewish mother. They planned to leave Germany together. In 1936, Kirchbach fled to Amsterdam. She visited him regularly until he told her she was endangering her life by doing so. She aborted their child after a doctor advised her the pregnancy might kill her because she had a serious lung complaint. She never married and had no children.

Pomsel maintained until her death that she knew nothing about Hitler's Final Solution. She also denied feeling guilty, as: "Nothing's black and white. There's always a bit of grey in everything. I wouldn't see myself as guilty, unless you end up blaming the entire German population for ultimately enabling that government to take control. That was all of us, including me."

Towards the end of her life, Pomsel lived in Munich-Schwabing, Germany. She died in her sleep on 27 January 2017, Holocaust Memorial Day, at the age of 106.

== See also ==
- List of centenarians (miscellaneous)
