= Night and Day (play) =

1978 drama play by Tom Stoppard

- Cover of the Grove Press edition
- Original language: English
- Written by: Tom Stoppard
- Characters: George Guthrie; Jacob Milne; Mageeba; Francis; Ruth; Dick Wagner; Alastair
- Subject: Colonialism, the media
- Genre: Drama
- Setting: The living room of a large colonial house in an African nation

Premiere
- Date: November 8, 1978
- Place: Phoenix Theatre, London

Night and Day is a 1978 play by Tom Stoppard. The sets and costumes were designed by Carl Toms and it ran for two years at the Phoenix Theatre in central London, UK. The lead roles of Richard Wagner and Ruth Carson were created by John Thaw and Diana Rigg, respectively. Stoppard was a friend of journalist and popular historian Paul Johnson, and dedicated the play to him.

== Overview ==
The play is post-colonial in nature, a satire on the British news media, and an exploration of its discourse. Stoppard employs yet another sub-text in Night and Day by commenting on the very form of language through his remarks on journalism (Stoppard was a former journalist himself). There is a consistent use of pun and innuendo sprinkled in the dialogues of each character. This kind of linguistic play with words and meaning has marked the playwright for his interest and most keen observations on the aesthetics of language.

Night and Day throws up themes of colonization, journalism, language, and alternate or multiple realities. The plot narrative unfolds through the silent or subconscious thoughts of Ruth Carson, who is a bystander to the main events taking place around her. She is regularly shown to express conflicting ideas between what she is saying, and what she is actually thinking.

The narrative technique merges the forms of fiction and non-fiction, where Stoppard has created an imaginary country called Kambawi, located in Africa, and situated in a post-colonial time-space. The story of the play unveils the politics under which the British media approach the coverage of the impending internal war in this country, through the paradigms of objectivity, factual reportage and the inevitable realities of linguistic manipulation and double meaning.

== Reception ==
Night and Day won the Evening Standard Award for Best Play. In a positive review, Michael Billington wrote:

“Stoppard himself once said, ‘What's wrong with bad art is that the artist knows exactly what he is doing.’ Night and Day is an exhilarating refutation of that thesis: It's good art (wittiy [sic], stimulating, alive with ideas) but the result of a perfectly conscious intention. A Doll's House, Saint Joan and Mother Courage are three examples of masterpieces written out of a sense of burning conviction. And while Night and Day may not reach that level, it does at least prove that Stoppard can write about what is closest to his heart without sacrificing his natural dexterity. Passion and wit don't often go together, when they do we should applaud.”

Reviewing a 1982 Boston University production, Carolyn Clay of The Boston Phoenix was less enthusiastic:

"As it turns out, Stoppard does not do a bad impersonation of Shaw, providing two and a half hours of witty, stimulating conversation aimed at telling us what he thinks. He also emulates GBS by reserving his passion for his ideas, reducing most of his characters to mouthpieces with a few interesting quirks — no more than intellectual lip gloss. With one notable exception — a woman who is Candida steeped in Cole Porter, old movies, and Scotch — they talk a better game than they feel. Through them, Stoppard, too, verbalizes eloquently — while his play stands still and looks nice."
