= Lettice and Lovage =

Play by Peter Shaffer

- Written by: Peter Shaffer
- Original language: English

Premiere
- Date premiered: 6 October 1987
- Place premiered: Theatre Royal, Bath

Lettice and Lovage is a comical and satirical play by Peter Shaffer. It is centered on a flamboyant tour guide who loves to embellish the history behind an English country house and who butts heads with a fact-conscious official at the house. The play was written specifically for Dame Maggie Smith, who originated the title role of Lettice Douffet in both the English and American runs of the production. The role of Lotte Schoen was played by Margaret Tyzack.

Following a tour of provincial theatres, the play was produced in London in 1987. Its two-year run of 768 performances at the Globe Theatre counts as one of the longer runs in London theatrical history. After a year in the West End play, Smith and Tyzack were replaced by Geraldine McEwan and Sara Kestelman.

The play was revised by Shaffer in 1988. The first American production opened on 13 March 1990, with a preview performance of the revised play at the Ethel Barrymore Theatre in New York City. The Broadway version ran from 25 March 1990, to 23 December 1990, with a total of 286 performances. Lighting design by Ken Billington.

== Awards ==
- 1990 Tony Award Best Play (nominated)
- 1990 Tony Award Best Actress in a Play: Dame Maggie Smith - winner
- 1990 Tony Award Best Featured Actress in a Play: Margaret Tyzack - winner
- 1990 Tony Award Best Direction of a Play (nominated)

== Production history ==
Peter Shaffer describes Lettice and Lovage as a "very English piece" as far as its humor and references. He altered the ending for the American production, but not for the reason of "Americanizing" it:

This version contains a significant rewrite. In the original... the two ladies were left at the end preparing to blow up a select list of modern architectural monstrosities with a petard - a medieval explosive device. This fantastic conclusion produced much laughter, but I was always aware of how assiduously it had been tacked onto the play in order to do just that. It was a forced climax, dismissing the piece into improbability... Finally the present one was born, and seemed to me both correct and pleasing... with this rewrite, Lettice prospers, and Lotte prospers with her, and their progenitor is happy.

The New York Times review on 26 March 1990, said that "Miss Smith's personality so saturates everything around her that, like the character she plays, she instantly floods a world of gray with color". Once Smith had left, reviews were more mixed. In the 28 June 1992, review, the Times observed, "It is bizarre to observe how a play that singlemindedly renounces dullness – this is what Lettice calls 'the mere' – exudes such unshakable tedium." and "It is disillusioning to confront the defectiveness of Mr. Shaffer's construction without a star of transcendent artistry – or is it alchemy? – to hold it up." The review also called into question Shaffer's re-write, stating, "the third act... is a set-up for a last-minute upbeat switch, a solution for coping with the present that is inane and fake."

== Characters ==
- Lettice Douffet
- Lotte Schoen
- Miss Framer
- Mr. Bardolph
- A Surly Man
- Visitors to Fustian House

== Synopsis ==
Lettice and Lovage is set in England. The action takes place in three primary locations: the Grand Hall of Fustian House, Wiltshire, England; Miss Schoen's office at the Preservation Trust, Architrave Place, London; and Miss Douffet's basement apartment, Earls Court, London. This synopsis delineates the action of the production seen by American audiences in 1990.

=== Act one ===
Lettice Douffet is showing a group of tourists around Fustian House, an old, dreary, and (as the name suggests) fusty sixteenth-century hall. The rain-drenched tourists are clearly bored and miserable. Lettice is reciting a rehearsed monologue pointing out the not-very-interesting history of the hall. As the tourists leave in a kind of stupor, Lettice feels dejected. The scene shifts to several days later at the same spot. Lettice is again reciting her boring monologue, but suddenly she is filled with inspiration and begins improvising a wildly untrue (yet entertaining) story about the staircase in the hall. The tourists are jolted from their reveries and thoroughly enraptured by her tale.

Some days later, Lettice is once again telling the "history" of the hall, only her tale has become even more fanciful and grandiose. She is filled with confidence and the (larger) audience of excited tourists hangs on her every word. Lettice is challenged by a disagreeable fellow who demands to see her references for the story. She successfully averts his questions, much to the enjoyment of the rest of the crowd.

The next scene reveals Lettice telling an even larger version of the now completely ridiculous yet salacious story to salivating tourists. She is this time interrupted by Lotte Schoen, who dismisses the rest of the crowd, insisting she must speak to Lettice alone. Lotte reveals she works for Preservation Trust, which owns Fustian House. She tells Lettice she must report to the Trust the next day to have her position reviewed.

The next afternoon Lettice is shown in to Lotte's office. She defends her embellishment of the facts by stating that the House's architecture and history is too dull. Lettice says she lives her life by a code her mother taught her: "Enlarge! Enliven! Enlighten!". Lotte chafes at the discovery that Lettice's mother was an actress and sits dumbfounded at Lettice's assertions of her mother's colorful past and its influence on her. Lotte tells Lettice that she has twenty-two letters of complaint about her false recitations at Fustian House. She fires Lettice, who despairs and wonders what a woman of her age can do. She leaves the Trust, but not before telling Lotte a story about Mary, Queen of Scots. Mary had dressed herself in a red dress the day of her execution to defy her accusers. As she tells the story, Lettice drops her cloak to reveal a red nightdress.

=== Act two ===
It is ten weeks later. Lettice is in her basement flat with her cat, Felina. The apartment is adorned with theatrical posters, furniture, props, and relics. Lotte Schoen unexpectedly arrives at the flat and is dismayed by the sight of the cat, saying she has an aversion to them. Lotte then produces a letter of reference she has written for Lettice to obtain a new position giving tours on boats on the Thames. Lettice is very moved by her gesture and apologizes for behaving rudely. She insists they have a celebratory drink together. They spend a long scene drinking and talking, where they begin to find similarities in their very different personalities—notably, a disgust with modern English architecture and all things "mere". Inebriated, Lotte begins telling of a man with whom she was once in love, who aspired to be a terrorist by blowing up modern buildings in London to oppose the destruction of historical architecture. Lotte divulges he and she had a secret alliance called E.N.D.—Eyesore Negation Detachment. She says she ran out on her end of the bargain and did not plant a bomb intended to blow up a wing of the Shell Building. Her betrayal of the agreement ruined the relationship and, consequently, her life. Lettice listens with much sympathy. Lotte invites her to dinner and tells her it is her Mary, Queen of Scots story that really prompted her to come. Lettice tells her the rest of the story—how Queen Mary also wore a wig to her execution, prompting the executioner to grab her wig and not her head after it was detached. Lotte reveals that she is wearing a wig and requests Lettice to take it off, in an act of solidarity.

=== Act Three ===
Six months later, Lettice is being interviewed in her home by a lawyer, who says she is accused of a "peculiarly unpleasant crime". We learn through a series of questions and answers that Lotte and Lettice had become fast friends and taken to enacting famous historical trials and executions in Lettice's flat. It becomes clear that, during one of these theatrical displays, Lotte was inadvertently injured and that the lawyer is at Lettice's home to inform her of an indictment against her. Lotte again shows up unexpectedly. The lawyer insists on hearing the whole story, claiming Lettice's defense relies upon it. Lotte insists it cannot be spoken at a trial. As Lettice continues her story (acting it out along the way and embellishing it with stories of Lotte's now rather theatrical behavior), Lotte becomes more and more agitated. We learn Lettice's cat startled Lotte in the midst of their performance, causing her to become injured. The lawyer tells them both that they must testify to this to get the case against Lettice thrown out. Lotte says, if the information gets out, it will ruin her life and career. Lotte claims Lettice tricked her into the acting games and suggests her theatricality is one big act. She cruelly insults Lettice and walks out. Lettice stops her with a heartfelt speech about how the technological modern age is leaving her behind. Lotte storms back in, outraged that Lettice is "giving up". They make up and decide to re-invent E.N.D., only without bombs. They plan to give tours at the "fifty ugliest new buildings in London", using Lotte's architectural knowledge and Lettice's flair for the dramatic (and propensity for lying). The play ends with the two women toasting the audience.

== Bibliography ==
- Disch, Thomas M. Nation; 5/7/1990, Vol. 250 Issue 18, p643, 2p;(AN 10417667)
- Gianakaris, C.J. Theatre Journal, Vol. 40, No. 4. (Dec., 1988), pp. 548–550.
- Shaffer, Peter. Lettice and Lovage. New York: Harper and Row, 1990.
