= Vincent D'Onofrio =

American actor and filmmaker (born 1959)

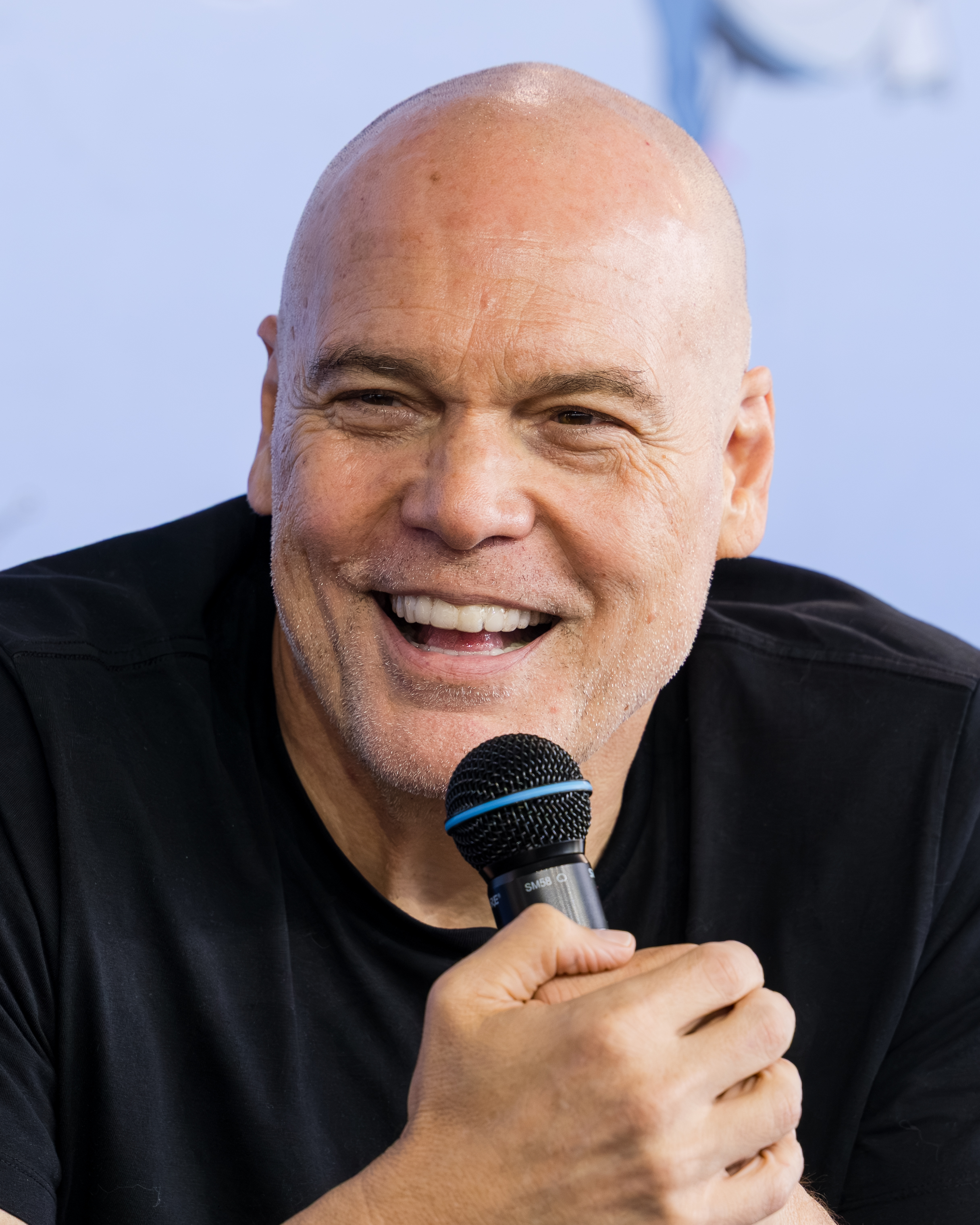
- D'Onofrio at GalaxyCon Nashville in 2026
- Born: Vincent Philip D'Onofrio; June 30, 1959 (age 67); Brooklyn, New York, U.S.
- Occupations: Actor; director; producer; screenwriter
- Years active: 1983–present
- Known for: Full Metal Jacket; Law & Order: Criminal Intent; Daredevil; Men in Black; Jurassic World
- Spouse: Carin van der Donk (m. 1997; sep. 2023)
- Partner: Greta Scacchi (1989–1993)
- Children: 3, including Leila George

Vincent Philip D'Onofrio (/dəˈnɒfrioʊ/; born June 30, 1959) is an American actor and filmmaker. He is known for his supporting and leading roles in both film and television. He has been nominated for a Primetime Emmy Award.

His roles include Private Leonard "Gomer Pyle" Lawrence in Full Metal Jacket (1987), Robert E. Howard in The Whole Wide World (1996), Edgar the Bug in Men in Black (1997) and Men in Black: The Series (1997–2001), Carl Stargher in The Cell (2000), New York City Police Detective Robert Goren in Law & Order: Criminal Intent (2001–11), and Victor "Vic" Hoskins in Jurassic World (2015). Since 2015, he has portrayed Wilson Fisk / Kingpin in the Marvel Cinematic Universe, including in the television series Daredevil (2015–2018) and Daredevil: Born Again (2025–present).

== Early life ==
D'Onofrio was born on June 30, 1959, in Brooklyn, New York. His paternal grandfather was an upholsterer and his maternal grandparents opened the first Italian restaurant in Hawaii. His parents Gennaro "Gene" Joseph D'Onofrio and Phyllis Ann Minicola met and married while Gennaro was stationed in Hawaii with the U.S. Air Force. Gennaro was trained as an interior decorator but spent most of his spare time in amateur theater. Vincent is the youngest of three siblings and the only son. His older sisters are Antoinette (born 1956) and Elizabeth (born 1957), an actress and drama coach residing in Fort Myers Beach, Florida. He was raised in Hawaii and Colorado during his early years.

D'Onofrio's parents divorced when he was young; his mother later married George Meyer, making Vincent a stepbrother to Guy and Connie, Meyer's children from a previous marriage. The family relocated to the Hialeah, Florida area. D'Onofrio has described himself as a shy boy who spent "a lot of time in my room, staying in my head". He later became interested in magic and sleight of hand, learning from Cuban entertainers who owned a small magic shop.

In his teens, he worked backstage in set building and sound production at a number of community theaters run by his father. He graduated from Hialeah-Miami Lakes Senior High School.

== Career ==
=== Acting and filmmaking ===
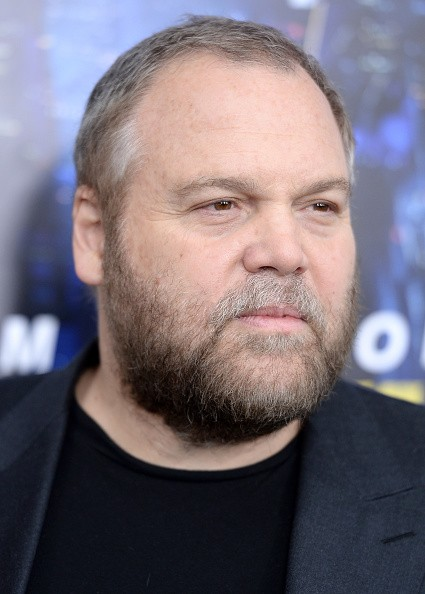
D'Onofrio in 2014

After graduating from high school, D'Onofrio started to appear on stage. During an 18-month stint at the University of Colorado in Boulder, he was involved with small, community-theater productions. He later studied method acting at the American Stanislavsky Theater and the Actors Studio, under coaches Sonia Moore and Sharon Chatten, which landed him his first paid role in Off-Broadway's This Property Is Condemned. He went on to appear in a number of their productions, including Of Mice and Men and Sexual Perversity in Chicago. D'Onofrio continued his career by performing in many New York University student productions while also working as a bouncer at the Hard Rock Cafe, a bodyguard for Robert Plant and Yul Brynner and also worked as a deliveryman.

In 1984, he made his Broadway debut as Nick Rizzoli in Open Admissions. In 1986, D'Onofrio took on the role often considered the defining moment in his acting career, as Pvt. Leonard Lawrence, an overweight, clumsy Marine recruit in the movie Full Metal Jacket. On a tip from friend Matthew Modine, D'Onofrio was urged to send audition tapes to director Stanley Kubrick, in England. Four tapes later, D'Onofrio landed the role. Originally, the character of Pvt. Lawrence had been written as a "skinny ignorant redneck"; however, Kubrick believed the role would have more impact if the character were big and clumsy. D'Onofrio gained 70 lb (32 kg) for the role, bringing his weight to 280 lb (130 kg). While filming an obstacle course scene for the movie, D'Onofrio injured his left knee, compounded by the excessive weight, which required surgical reconstruction.

Over the course of nine months after filming of Full Metal Jacket was completed, D'Onofrio lost nearly all the weight he had gained for his role. He went on to play Dawson, the owner of Dawson's Garage, in Adventures in Babysitting (1987). He appears in one scene near the end of the film. In 1988, he was cast in another supporting role in the film Mystic Pizza, playing the fiancé of Lili Taylor's character. In the film, which was Julia Roberts' breakout film, he was billed under his full name Vincent Philip D'Onofrio. In 1989 he played a supporting role as Young Gar in The Blood of Heroes alongside Joan Chen and Rutger Hauer, for which he is also billed under his full name.

D'Onofrio continued to play a wide variety of minor or supporting roles, including the father of a saint in Nancy Savoca's Household Saints (1993), director Orson Welles in Tim Burton's Ed Wood (1994), farmer Edgar and the evil "Bug" that possesses him from Men in Black (1997), a man who claims to be from the future in Happy Accidents (2000), and the serial killer Carl Stargher, opposite Jennifer Lopez's character in The Cell (2000).

In 1992, he appeared in Robert Altman's The Player, as an aspiring screenwriter.

In 1996, he interpreted pulp writer Robert E. Howard, author of Conan the Barbarian in Dan Ireland's The Whole Wide World (1996) adapted from Novalyne Price Ellis' mémoire One Who Walked Alone: Robert E. Howard, The Final Years. The Whole Wide World was awarded Best New American Film at The Seattle International Film Festival (1996).

For the role of Robert E. Howard D'Onofrio was awarded Best Actor at the 1996 Seattle International Film Festival and Best Actor at the 1998 Lone Star Film & Television Awards.

In 1997, he made a move to television and received an Emmy nomination for his appearance as John Lange in the Homicide: Life on the Street episode "Subway".

D'Onofrio turned down a role in The Sopranos. He portrayed leftist radical Abbie Hoffman in Steal This Movie! in 2000, starring Janeane Garofalo as his wife.

In 2001, he took on what became his longest and perhaps best-known role as Det. Robert Goren on the NBC/USA Network television show Law & Order: Criminal Intent. On March 1, 2008, D'Onofrio made a cameo appearance in a presidential election-related sketch in a Saturday Night Live episode as his character Det. Robert Goren. In the sketch, he interrogates Hillary Clinton (played by Amy Poehler). His entrance to and exit from the skit are punctuated by the Law & Order "dun-DUN" sound.

In 2009, it was announced that D'Onofrio would be leaving Law & Order: Criminal Intent in the spring of 2010, with his last appearance occurring in the two-part, season-9 premiere. He was replaced by Jeff Goldblum, but after a drop in ratings, D'Onofrio and Kathryn Erbe agreed to return for a 10th (and final) season of the show.

In 2003, it was reported that D'Onofrio and Joe Pantoliano had begun work on a small film titled Little Victories, about a 12-year-old boy whose perceptions of the world are forever changed when his gangster uncle comes to live with him. According to a television interview with Pantoliano, the film was not completed and went into turnaround due to a failure to raise the funds necessary for production.

In November 2005, D'Onofrio won Best Actor at the Stockholm International Film Festival for his role as Mike Cobb in the independent film Thumbsucker. In 2006, he appeared in The Break-Up, starring Jennifer Aniston and Vince Vaughn, playing Vaughn's eccentric brother. Vaughn and he had appeared together in two previous films, The Cell (2000), wherein Vaughn played an FBI agent pursuing D'Onofrio's character, and Thumbsucker (2005). He appears in the Oscar-winning short The New Tenants (2009).

Over the next few years, D'Onofrio co-starred in films such as: Staten Island (2009), Brooklyn's Finest (2010), Kill the Irishman (2011), Crackers (2011), American Falls (2012), Fire with Fire (2012), and Ass Backwards (2013).

In 2011, he began work on the Jennifer Lynch 2012 film Chained (previously titled Rabbit) in which he portrays Bob, a serial killer who kidnaps a young boy, Rabbit, and makes him his protégé. When he becomes older, Rabbit must decide whether to follow in the footsteps of his captor or plan his escape. The film shot in areas in and around Regina and Moose Jaw, both in Saskatchewan. On May 1, 2012, due to "explicit violence", the movie was given an NC-17 rating by the MPAA, despite appeals by both Jennifer Lynch and the distributor, with scenes cut to maximize theater exposure and distribution. No stranger to the NC-17 ratings, Lynch, who responded to the ruling a day later had previously seen cuts made to her film Boxing Helena. In July 2012, a press release from Anchor Bay announced that the film would be released on Blu-ray and DVD on October 2, 2012, and would include the deleted scene, involving a throat being cut, which caused the NC-17 rating.

On September 14, 2011, it was announced that D'Onofrio would star alongside Ethan Hawke in a new NBC show, Blue Tilt, named after the harmful psychological effects homicide detectives experience after constantly dealing with horrific crimes. D'Onofrio and Hawke had worked together in the films The Newton Boys, Staten Island, Brooklyn's Finest and Sinister. The hour-long cop drama, in which D'Onofrio would play Sonny, was to follow the main characters' attempts to balance their careers with family life. Writer Chris Brancato, fresh from Season 10 of Law & Order: Criminal Intent, was brought on board to pen the episodes. Filming of the pilot episode was set to start in February 2012. On March 27, 2012, a tweet from Kevin Dunigan, the co-creator and developer of the pilot, revealed that NBC had shelved the project because it did not have enough "pop to attract viewers".

On April 30, 2012, the short film Crackers, starring D'Onofrio as Gus, won a People's Choice Award at the Fort Myers Beach Film Festival. The festival, which had been dormant for six years, was rekindled and partly organized by Vincent's sister, actress Elizabeth D'Onofrio.

Also in November, filming began on the Vidhu Vinod Chopra movie Broken Horses, which focused on gang warfare around the border between the United States and Mexico. D'Onofrio starred alongside Chris Marquette and Anton Yelchin.

In 2013, D'Onofrio co-starred in the film Escape Plan, filmed in New Orleans, also starring Sylvester Stallone, Arnold Schwarzenegger, and 50 Cent. D'Onofrio portrayed Lester Clark, deputy director of the Prisons Bureau.

D'Onofrio co-starred in the film drama The Judge (2014).

His other projects included a role in Supreme Ruler with Marcia Gay Harden and Jeffrey Dean Morgan, Eric Bogosian's Mall which he co-wrote with his former Law & Order: Criminal Intent co-star, and Pawn Shop Chronicles.

In 2015, D'Onofrio made his Marvel Cinematic Universe debut as Wilson Fisk in the first season of Daredevil. He reprised the role in an extended cameo appearance in season 2, and in season 3 as a series regular. He also portrayed Victor "Vic" Hoskins in the action adventure film Jurassic World (2015), and Jack Horne in Antoine Fuqua's 2016 remake of The Magnificent Seven.

In 2016, he played the role of the evil Duke Luca Abele in the video game Dishonored 2. He was able to draw upon his extensive acting experience to fully flesh out the voice of the corrupt Duke Abele in various public speeches that were broadcast in-game over large speakers suspended in the game area.

He plays the role of Vincent "The Chin" Gigante in the American crime drama television series Godfather of Harlem. The series began in 2019 and has four seasons. Godfather of Harlem will not have a traditional Season 5; instead, MGM+ canceled the series and is concluding the story with a two-hour series finale film.

D'Onofrio returned to the role of Wilson Fisk / Kingpin in the Marvel Studios Disney+ series Hawkeye (2021), Echo (2024), and Daredevil: Born Again (2025–present). For his performance in Hawkeye, he was nominated for the Critics Choice Super Award for Best Villain in a Series. D'Onofrio and co-star Charlie Cox were credited as executive producers for season two of Daredevil: Born Again.

=== Directing ===
D'Onofrio has also had success behind the camera, producing The Whole Wide World (1996), in which he also starred, and Guy (1997) as well as executive producing The Velocity of Gary (1998) and Steal This Movie! (2000). In 2005, he directed and starred in the short film Five Minutes, Mr. Welles (2005), which represented a culmination of D'Onofrio's desire to improve on his performance as Welles in Ed Wood, which reportedly left director Tim Burton underwhelmed. Burton decided to procure the services of Maurice LaMarche, a voiceover artist known for his imitation of Welles' voice, to produce a more dramatically effective rendering of the character's dialogue. Disappointed with his performance, having been given two weeks notice to prepare for the role, D'Onofrio wrote, produced, directed, and starred in the short in answer to the critics and himself. The film depicts D'Onofrio as Welles preparing for his role in The Third Man.

In 2008, he returned to directing with the feature-length musical slasher Don't Go in the Woods (2010), written by his friend Joe Vinciguerra, featuring a score by Sam Bisbee, and starring various unknown actors hand-picked by D'Onofrio. It follows an indie rock band who venture into the woods to write new music, only to meet a crazed murderer (Tim Lajcik). The film, shot in 13 days near Kingston, New York, had a budget of $100,000 and played at numerous festivals throughout 2009 and 2010. Initially slated for national release in December 2011, the film opened to limited theaters on January 13, 2012, and was released on DVD on June 12, 2012. His next project is directing and starring in the 2019 western The Kid.

=== Music ===
On October 27, 2009, D'Onofrio made his musical debut, appearing in character as comedic country singer George Geronimo Gerkie at Joe's Pub in New York City. He appeared as Gerkie again at New York's Hammerstein Ballroom on December 6, 2009, during Matt Pinfield's Holiday Extravaganza Show and at the premiere of his movie Don't Go in the Woods at Joe's Pub on May 28, 2010. A fourth concert was held at the pub on July 22, 2010, with proceeds from the event going to the Utah Meth Cops project.

On November 11, 2011, while teaching students at the Tribeca Flashpoint Media Arts Academy, D'Onofrio discussed plans for further concerts, and a George Gerkie documentary which is to be filmed by Ultrasuede: In Search of Halston director Whitney Smith.

In September 2011, Australian hip hop band The Funkoars, released an album titled The Quickening, featuring the song "Being Vincent D'Onofrio", an homage to D'Onofrio's career and his work on Law and Order: Criminal Intent. In February 2012, the band announced their upcoming "Being Vincent D'Onofrio Tour 2012" with artwork featuring D'Onofrio's face in place of the band members'.

In 2014, D'Onofrio released two songs as part of an avant garde spoken-word project with multi-instrumentalist and composer Dana Lyn. The first single, "I'm a Hamster", gathered attention on social media. The full album was made available for purchase in March 2015, on the band's website.

=== Writing ===
In August 2022 D'Onofrio announced the upcoming publication of a children's book based on his viral tweet about pigs and their reputed inability to look up. The book, entitled Pigs Can't Look Up, was published in May 2023 and expanded on D'Onofrio's original tweet, creating a character who commits to the act of kindness the tweet described.

=== Other work ===
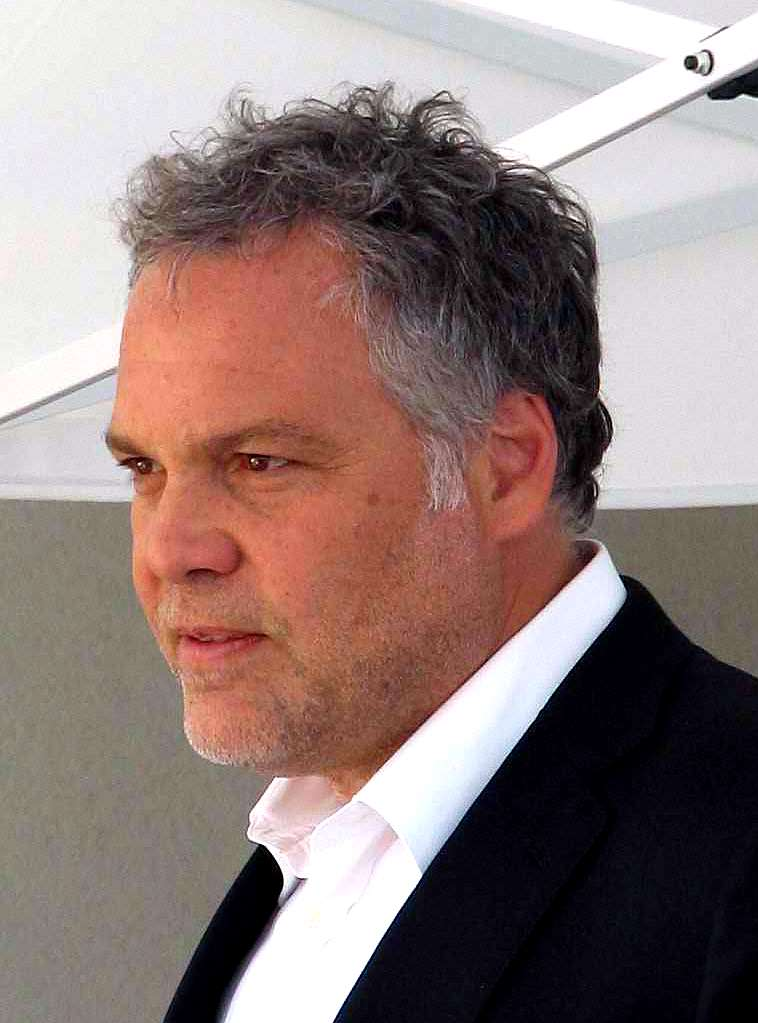
D'Onofrio at a fundraiser in Utah for the Meth Cops Project, for which he is the spokesperson, 2011

In 1998, D'Onofrio, with his father Gene and sister Elizabeth, founded the RiverRun International Film Festival in Winston-Salem, North Carolina. In 2003, former film producer and dean of the School of Filmmaking at the University of North Carolina School of the Arts, Dale Pollock, took over the festival and moved it from Brevard, North Carolina, to Winston-Salem. Annually, the festival showcases the best films offered from the independent and international industry, as well as those from student filmmakers.

In 2008, alongside his sister, Toni, D'Onofrio began hosting events to raise money for the Utah Meth Cops Project. He served as the project's spokesperson from 2009 to 2012.

In the fall of 2011, D'Onofrio became a member of the advisory board for the Woodstock Film Festival, which holds an annual event for independent films. Other members of the board include Griffin Dunne, Ethan Hawke, and Aidan Quinn.

In February 2011, D'Onofrio became a public face of the gun control debate, appearing in an ad by the Citizens Crime Commission of New York City urging a ban on large-capacity ammunition magazines.

In 2012, D'Onofrio returned to teach at the Lee Strasberg Theatre and Film Institute where his daughter was a student.

On August 9, 2012, it was announced that D'Onofrio had been chosen to narrate the documentary, Heroes Behind The Badge (2012). The film follows four fallen officers and the impact their deaths have had on their families, colleagues, and communities. The proceeds are benefitting a memorial museum being built in Washington, D.C. A longtime supporter of the National Law Enforcement Officers Memorial, D'Onofrio has been the spokesperson for the National Law Enforcement Officers Memorial Fund and Museum since 2010. A follow-up to the documentary, subtitled Sacrifice and Survival, was released in the fall of 2013.

On November 13, 2012, D'Onofrio joined the cast of the off-Broadway production Clive, alongside Brooks Ashmanskas and Zoe Kazan. Produced by Jonathan Marc Sherman and directed by Ethan Hawke, the play, based on Baal by Bertolt Brecht, opened at The New Group at Theatre Row on February 7, 2013.

== Personal life ==
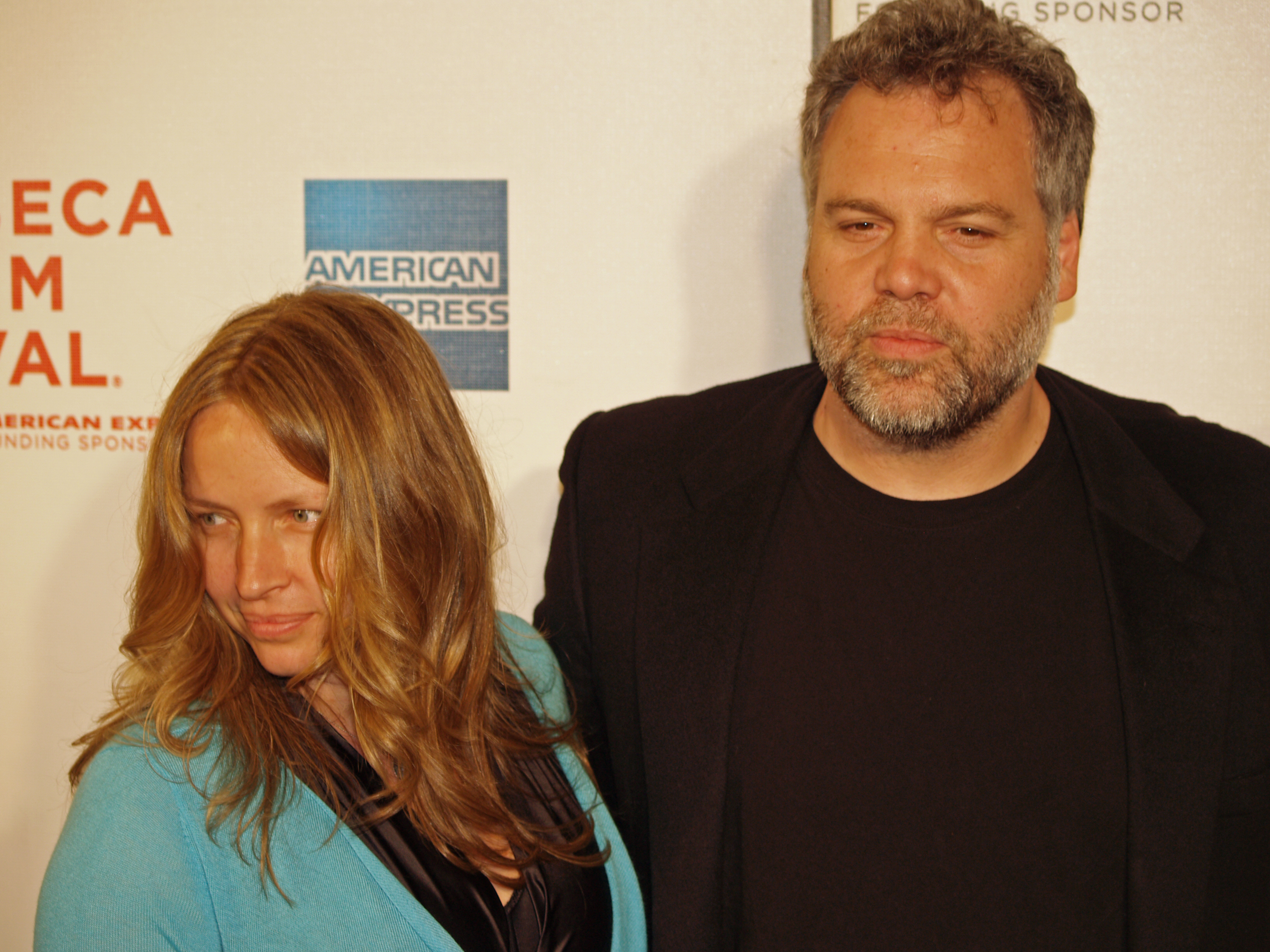
D'Onofrio with his wife Carin van der Donk at the Tribeca Film Festival in New York City for the premiere of Speed Racer in 2008

In the early 1990s, D'Onofrio dated actress Greta Scacchi, with whom he starred in several films during that period (including The Player and Fires Within). Their daughter is actress Leila George (b. ~1992). He was the father-in-law of actor Sean Penn, who was married to George from 2020 to 2022.

On March 22, 1997, D'Onofrio married Dutch model Carin van der Donk and the couple had a son (born 1999). They separated in the early 2000s, but reconciled and had a second son (born 2008).

In June 2023, D'Onofrio filed for divorce in Manhattan Supreme Court.

On November 10, 2004, D'Onofrio collapsed on the set of Law & Order: Criminal Intent. He collapsed again at home a few days later and was diagnosed with exhaustion, attributed to his 14-hour days filming Criminal Intent, and the making of his short film Five Minutes, Mr. Welles during the show's hiatus.

D'Onofrio is dyslexic. In 2011, he stated his belief that he might have been diagnosed with autism as a child had knowledge of the condition been more advanced at the time.

== Filmography ==
=== Film ===
| Year | Title | Role | Notes |
|---|---|---|---|
| 1983 | The First Turn-On! | Lobotomy | |
| 1984 | It Don't Pay to Be an Honest Citizen | Bennie | |
| 1987 | Full Metal Jacket | Private Leonard 'Gomer Pyle' Lawrence | |
| 1987 | Adventures in Babysitting | Dawson | |
| 1988 | Mystic Pizza | Bill Montijo | |
| 1989 | Signs of Life | Daryl Monahan | |
| 1989 | The Salute of the Jugger | Gar | |
| 1991 | Crooked Hearts | Charley | |
| 1991 | Dying Young | Gordon | |
| 1991 | Fires Within | Sam | |
| 1991 | Naked Tango | Cholo | |
| 1991 | JFK | Bill Newman | |
| 1992 | The Player | David Kahane | |
| 1992 | Salt on Our Skin | Gavin | |
| 1993 | Being Human | Priest | |
| 1993 | Household Saints | Joseph Santangelo | |
| 1993 | Mr. Wonderful | Dominic | |
| 1994 | Ed Wood | Orson Welles | Voice dubbed by Maurice LaMarche |
| 1994 | The Investigator | Ephraim McDougall | Short film |
| 1994 | Imaginary Crimes | Mr. Webster | |
| 1995 | Stuart Saves His Family | Donnie | |
| 1995 | Strange Days | Officer Burton Steckler | |
| 1995 | Hotel Paradise | The Naked Stranger | Short film |
| 1996 | The Whole Wide World | Robert E. Howard | Also producer |
| 1996 | The Winner | Philip | |
| 1996 | Feeling Minnesota | Sam Clayton | |
| 1996 | Good Luck | Tony 'Ole' Olezniak | |
| 1997 | Boys Life 2 | Tony Randozza | Segment: "Nunzio's Second Cousin" |
| 1997 | Men in Black | Edgar / The Bug | |
| 1997 | Guy | Guy | Also producer |
| 1998 | The Newton Boys | Wylie 'Dock' Newton | |
| 1998 | Claire Dolan | Elton Garrett | |
| 1998 | The Velocity of Gary | Valentino | Also executive producer |
| 1999 | Spanish Judges | Max | |
| 1999 | The Thirteenth Floor | Jason Whitney / Jerry Ashton | |
| 2000 | Happy Accidents | Sam Deed | |
| 2000 | Steal This Movie! | Abbie Hoffman | Also executive producer |
| 2000 | The Cell | Carl Rudolph Stargher | |
| 2001 | Chelsea Walls | Frank | |
| 2001 | Impostor | Major Hathaway | |
| 2002 | Bark! | Malcolm | |
| 2002 | Sherlock: Case of Evil | James Moriarty | |
| 2002 | The Dangerous Lives of Altar Boys | Father Casey | |
| 2002 | The Salton Sea | Pooh-Bear | |
| 2005 | Thumbsucker | Mike Cobb | |
| 2005 | Five Minutes, Mr. Welles | Orson Welles | Short film; also writer, director and producer |
| 2006 | The Break-Up | Dennis Grobowski | |
| 2008 | The Narrows | Vinny Manadoro | |
| 2008 | Cadillac Records | Mississippi DJ | Uncredited |
| 2009 | Ipso Facto | — | Executive producer |
| 2009 | Staten Island | Parmie Tarzo | |
| 2009 | The New Tenants | Jan | Short film |
| 2010 | Zaritsas: Russian Women in New York | — | Executive producer |
| 2010 | Don't Go in the Woods | — | Writer and director |
| 2010 | Brooklyn's Finest | Bobby 'Carlo' Powers | |
| 2011 | Kill the Irishman | John Nardi | |
| 2011 | Crackers | Gus | Short film |
| 2012 | Chained | Bob | |
| 2012 | American Falls | Detective Foster | Short film |
| 2012 | Fire with Fire | David Hagan | Direct-to-DVD |
| 2012 | Sinister | Professor Jonas | Uncredited |
| 2013 | Ass Backwards | Bruce West | |
| 2013 | Charlie Countryman | Bill | |
| 2013 | Chlorine | Roger | |
| 2013 | Pawn Shop Chronicles | Alton | |
| 2013 | Escape Plan | Lester Clark | |
| 2014 | The Unlicensed Therapist | The Unlicensed Therapist | Short film |
| 2014 | Mall | Danny | Also producer |
| 2014 | The Judge | Glen Palmer | |
| 2015 | Run All Night | Detective John Harding | |
| 2015 | Broken Horses | Julius Hench | Remake of 1989 Bollywood film Parinda |
| 2015 | Jurassic World | Victor "Vic" Hoskins | |
| 2015 | Sinister 2 | Professor Jonas | Credit only |
| 2016 | Pelé: Birth of a Legend | Vicente Feola | |
| 2016 | In Dubious Battle | London | |
| 2016 | The Magnificent Seven | Jack Horne | |
| 2016 | Phantom Boy | The Face | English dub |
| 2017 | Rings | Galen Burke | |
| 2017 | CHiPs | Ray 'The Ringleader' Kurtz | |
| 2017 | El Camino Christmas | Carl Hooker | |
| 2018 | Death Wish | Frank Kersey | |
| 2019 | The Kid | Sheriff Romero | Also director |
| 2021 | The Eyes of Tammy Faye | Jerry Falwell | |
| 2021 | The Unforgivable | John Ingram | |
| 2023 | Dumb Money | Steve Cohen | |
| 2023 | Wildcat | Sheriff | |
| 2024 | Lift | Denton | |
| 2025 | Caught Stealing | Shmully | |

=== Television ===
| Year | Title | Role | Notes |
|---|---|---|---|
| 1986 | The Equalizer | Thomas Marley Jr. | Episode: "Counterfire" |
| 1987 | The Equalizer | Davy Baylor | Episode: "Suspicion of Innocence" |
| 1987 | Miami Vice | Leon Wolf | Episode: "The Afternoon Plane" |
| 1997 | Homicide: Life on the Street | John Lange | Episode: "Subway" |
| 1998 | The Taking of Pelham One Two Three | Mr. Blue | Television film |
| 1998–2000 | Men in Black: The Series | Edgar / The Bug | Voice role; 3 episodes |
| 1999 | That Championship Season | Phil Romano | Television film |
| 2001–2011 | Law & Order: Criminal Intent | Detective Robert Goren | 141 episodes |
| 2002 | Sherlock: Case of Evil | Moriarty | Television film |
| 2002 | The Red Sneakers | Mercado | Television film |
| 2009 | Xavier: Renegade Angel | Eric / The Judge | Voice role; 2 episodes |
| 2015 | Last Week Tonight with John Oliver | Inspector | Episode: "Infrastructure" |
| 2015 | Sinatra: All or Nothing at All | Dean Elson | Voice role; Episode: "Part 1" |
| 2015–2018 | Daredevil | Wilson Fisk / Kingpin | 27 episodes |
| 2017 | Emerald City | Frank Morgan / The Wizard of Oz | 10 episodes |
| 2017 | BoJack Horseman | Himself | Voice role; Episode: "See Mr. Peanutbutter Run" |
| 2017–2018 | Ghost Wars | Father Dan Carpenter | 8 episodes |
| 2019–present | Godfather of Harlem | Vincent 'The Chin' Gigante | 24 episodes |
| 2020 | Interrogation | Sergeant Ian Lynch | 4 episodes |
| 2020 | Ratched | George Milburn | 5 episodes |
| 2021 | The Moth Effect | Varatanga | Episode: "Have You Heard of the White Ant?" |
| 2021 | Work in Progress | Himself | 2 episodes |
| 2021 | Hawkeye | Wilson Fisk / Kingpin | Miniseries; 2 episodes |
| 2022–2024 | Marvel Studios: Assembled | Himself | 2 episodes |
| 2022 | The Last Movie Stars | Karl Malden / John Huston | Voice role; 2 episodes |
| 2024 | Echo | Wilson Fisk / Kingpin | Miniseries; 4 episodes |
| 2025–2027 | Daredevil: Born Again | Wilson Fisk / Kingpin | 16 episodes; also executive producer |
| 2026 | The Beauty | Byron Forst (Pre Beauty) | Episode: "Beautiful Billionaires" |

=== Audio ===
- Mr. Laughs: A Look Behind the Curtain (2008), narrator for autobiographical documentary based on the life of comedian Sal Richards.
- Man on the Ledge (October 2010), radio play.
- Heroes Behind the Badge (Fall 2012), narrator for documentary.
- Like Father, Like Son and Ram King (October 2012), Tales From Beyond The Pale live radio play performed live at Dixon Place in NYC.
- Citizen Jane: Battle for the City (April 2017), voice of Robert Moses for documentary on Jane Jacobs' crusade to save Washington Square Park from being overrun by an expressway.

=== Video games ===
| Year | Title | Role |
|---|---|---|
| 2005 | Law & Order: Criminal Intent | Detective Robert Goren |
| 2015 | Lego Jurassic World | Victor "Vic" Hoskins |
| 2016 | Dishonored 2 | Duke Luca Abele; Armando |

== Awards and nominations ==
| Year | Award | Category | Work | Result |
|---|---|---|---|---|
| 1987 | New York Film Critics Circle Award | Best Supporting Actor | Full Metal Jacket | Nominated |
| 1994 | Independent Spirit Award | Best Male Lead | Household Saints | Nominated |
| 1996 | Golden Space Needle Award | Best Actor | The Whole Wide World | Nominated |
| 1996 | Seattle International Film Festival | Best Actor | The Whole Wide World | Won |
| 1997 | National Society of Film Critics Award | Best Actor | The Whole Wide World | Nominated |
| 1998 | Lone Star Film & Television Award | Best Actor | The Whole Wide World | Won |
| 1998 | Primetime Emmy Awards | Primetime Emmy Award for Outstanding Guest Actor in a Drama Series | Homicide: Life on the Street | Nominated |
| 1998 | Saturn Awards | Best Supporting Actor | Men in Black | Won |
| 1998 | Blockbuster Entertainment Award | Favorite Supporting Actor | Men in Black | Nominated |
| 2001 | Blockbuster Entertainment Award | Favorite Supporting Actor | The Cell | Nominated |
| 2001 | Fangoria Chainsaw Awards | Best Supporting Actor | The Cell | Won |
| 2001 | MTV Movie Award | Best Villain | The Cell | Nominated |
| 2005 | Satellite Award | Best Actor – Television Series Drama | Law & Order: Criminal Intent | Nominated |
| 2005 | Stockholm Film Festival Award | Best Actor | Thumbsucker | Won |
| 2009 | Nashville Film Festival Award | Best Actor | The Narrows | Won |
| 2012 | Sitges Film Festival | Best Actor | Chained | Won |
| 2015 | Teen Choice Awards | Teen Choice Award for Choice Movie Villain | Jurassic World | Nominated |
| 2015 | EWwy Awards | Best Supporting Actor in a Drama Series | Daredevil | Nominated |
| 2015 | IGN Summer Movie Awards | Best TV Actor | Daredevil | Nominated |
| 2015 | IGN Summer Movie Awards | Best TV Villain | Daredevil | Nominated |
| 2016 | Saturn Award | Best Supporting Actor on Television | Daredevil | Nominated |
| 2018 | IGN Summer Movie Awards | Best Dramatic TV Performance | Daredevil | Nominated |
| 2022 | Critics' Choice Super Awards | Best Villain in a Series | Hawkeye | Nominated |
| 2025 | Astra TV Awards | Best Supporting Actor in a Drama Series | Daredevil: Born Again | Nominated |
| 2025 | Critics' Choice Super Awards | Best Villain in a Series | Daredevil: Born Again | Nominated |

Awards and achievements
Seattle International Film Festival
| Preceded by Kevin Spacey for The Usual Suspects | Best Actor for The Whole Wide World; 1996 | Succeeded by Brendan Fraser for Still Breathing |
Saturn Awards
| Preceded by Brent Spiner for Star Trek: First Contact | Best Supporting Actor for Men in Black; 1997 | Succeeded by Ian McKellen for Apt Pupil |
