= Patrícia Mota =

American actress and film producer

- Born: Dominican Republic
- Occupations: actress and film producer

Patricia Mota (born 1982) is an actress and film producer of Dominican Republic descent, She played a lead role in the critically acclaimed film GI Jesús that premiered at the "Grauman's Egyptian Theatre", on January 23, 2007, with Cineville. GI Jesús took the Grand Jury Prize at CineVegas 06 film festival. She was also in the film State Property 2 with Lions Gate.

== Career ==
Mota is now CEO of Mota Studios LLC, an artist community with a point of view and a group of artists with a voice and vision.

Mota is a painter, photographer and co-producer. She was born in the Dominican Republic, moving to the U.S. at age 12, and has a daughter, Preciosa Mota. For half of her life, she lived in North America in between New York, Miami and California. She is the sister of supermodel & actress Omahyra Mota.

== Awards ==
- She was nominated as the best actress in the Baja California film fest 2007 for the film GI Jesus.

== Filmography ==
Producer:

- The Land of the Astronauts (2007) (pre-production) (associate producer) .
- G.I. Jesus (2006) (co-producer) .
