= G.I. Jesús =

- Directed by: Carl Colpaert
- Written by: Carl Colpaert; Deborah Setele; Deon Wilks
- Starring: Joe Arquette; Patricia Mota
- Cinematography: Fred Goodlich
- Edited by: Wayne Kennedy; Nick Nehez
- Distributed by: Cineville
- Release dates: June 11, 2006 (CineVegas); January 26, 2007 (United States)
- Running time: 100 min
- Country: United States
- Language: English
- Budget: $2 million
- Box office: $8,593

G.I. Jesús (alternatively, G.I. Jesus) is a 2006 American film directed by Carl Colpaert. The film follows Jesús, a Mexican national seeking US citizenship through military service, who returns home to Los Angeles on furlough from the Iraq War. It won the grand jury prize at the 2006 CineVegas Film Festival.

== Plot ==
Jesús is a Mexican national who joins the United States Marine Corps to receive naturalization in the United States. After a traumatic incident during service in the Iraq War, he returns home on furlough to spend time with his wife and daughter in Los Angeles. As he attempts to reconcile his traumatic past with his home life, he begins to see visions of a man named Mohammed, who confronts Jesús over a father and daughter that Jesús accidentally killed in Iraq. Jesús increasingly has trouble distinguishing fantasy from reality, and visits a doctor who offers apparently paranoid theories about pharmaceutical experimentation on soldiers. Jesús is then ordered back to Iraq, increasing the strain on his family life. He considers returning to life in Mexico.

== Cast ==
- Joe Arquette as Jesús
- Patrícia Mota as Claudia
- Telana Lynum as Marina
- Maurizio Farhad as Mohammed
- Mark Wystrach as Sean

== Production ==
Director Carl Colpaert wrote the script for G.I. Jesús with two first-time co-writers, Deborah Setele and Deon Wilks. The film was shot on a budget of approximately $2 million. Colpaert specifically sought out unknown actors who had not earned a union card, which required casting "harder and longer" to find Mexican, Iranian, and Iraqi actors in the Los Angeles area. War footage in the film was taken from a Frontline television special.

== Release ==
The film was screened at the 2006 CineVegas film festival and won the Grand Jury Prize. It received an R rating and was released in 12 theaters on January 26, 2007, closing two weeks later. In March 2007, the film received an exclusive showing at the Laemmle Theatres Monica 4-plex. The following month G.I. Jesus was screened at the Village East Cinema in New York City. In August 2007, the film was screened in the Camelot Theatres in Palm Springs, California.

== Reception ==
=== Box office ===
The film grossed $6,014 in its opening weekend, and totaled $8,593 in gross receipts over its theatrical run.

=== Critical response ===
As of 2019 the film holds a score of 57 at Metacritic, indicating "mixed or average" reviews. In The New York Times, reviewer Matt Zoller Seitz criticized the film's writing and acting, but praised its narrative structure and its use of night-vision imagery as a visual device to contrast against everyday life. In The Village Voice, F. X. Feeney lauded the "flawless cast" and the director's ability to make the film on a small budget, but observed that the film required a "David Lynchian leap of faith" in the middle of the story. Writing for The Austin Chronicle, Josh Rosenblatt called the film "an odd little movie" and noted that it successfully portrayed some of the mental states of returning soldiers but focused too much on Jesús' inner thoughts. Justin Chang, writing for Variety, praised the film's topical coverage of the government's "exploitation of immigrant soldiers", but concluded that the film was "barely coherent and structurally all over the map". A Los Angeles Times review by Michael Ordona similarly focused on the political message of the film, noting that it asked important questions about the value of citizenship and whether veterans can ever recover from war.

=== Accolades ===
- 2006: Grand Jury Prize, CineVegas Film Festival
