= Maree Cheatham =

American actress

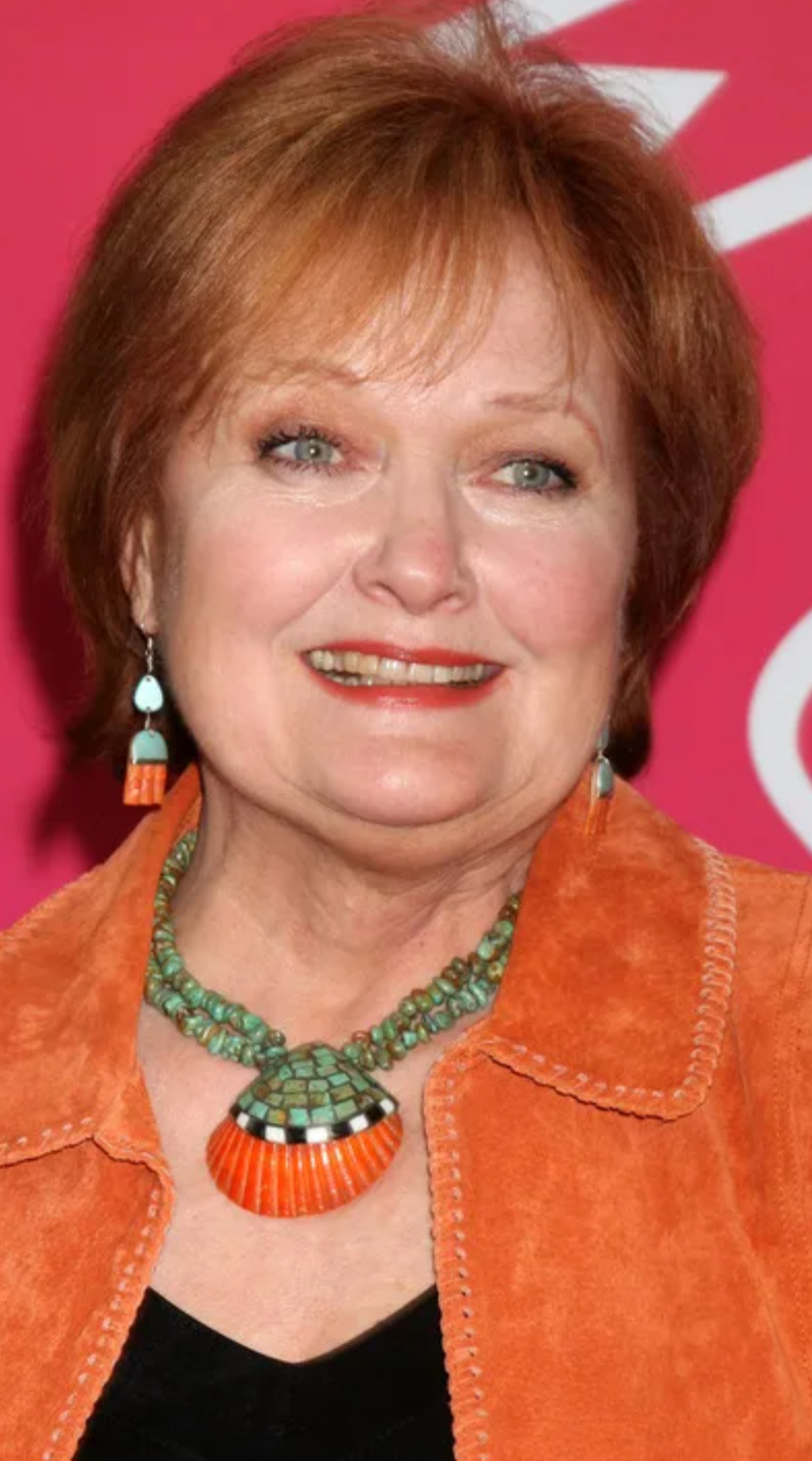
- Cheatham in 2014
- Occupation: Actress
- Years active: 1964–present

Maree Cheatham is an American actress, who is known for her performances on the daytime soap operas Days of Our Lives (1965–1968, 1970–1971, 1973, 1994, 1996, 2010, 2024, 2025), Search for Tomorrow, Knots Landing, and General Hospital, as well as for her role as Nona on the Nickelodeon comedy series Sam & Cat (2013–2014). She has also worked in many feature films, including Soul Man (1986), A Night at the Roxbury (1998), Hanging Up (2000), Labor Pains (2009) and Letters to God (2010).

== Life and career ==
Cheatham graduated from Bellaire High School in Bellaire, Texas in 1958. She was an original cast member of the daytime serial Days of Our Lives, in which she played the role of Marie Horton, who was the show's very first heroine. Horton has several traumatic relationships before going into a convent to become a nun.

After leaving Days of Our Lives in 1973, she moved to New York, where in 1974 she originated the role of the sarcastic and vampy Stephanie Wilkins on the soap opera Search for Tomorrow. She was replaced on that soap opera in early 1984 by actress and writer Louise Shaffer. In 1987, she became a regular cast member of General Hospital as Lucy Coe's wacky and fun-loving Aunt Charlene Simpson. When Gloria Monty returned as a producer in 1991, Cheatham was one of many cast members let go, but in 1998 Cheatham returned to the role with a brief appearance on the General Hospital spin-off Port Charles.

During the last two seasons of Knots Landing, she played the role of the scheming Mary Robeson, a blackmailer who became the victim in a murder mystery.

Cheatham has returned to Days of Our Lives on several occasions to reprise the role of Marie Horton, as a doctor and no longer a nun. She returned twice in 1994 and 2010 for tributes to actors that died — MacDonald Carey and Frances Reid who played Marie's father and mother, respectively. Her character also attended one of Bo and Hope's remarriages. In 2024 she returned for the funeral of Doug Williams played by Bill Hayes who was once married to her sister Addie and after her death, he married her daughter Julie (Marie's niece).

Cheatham played the role of Mona on the soap opera Passions in 2002.

She has also made many guest appearances in TV series such as Gunsmoke, Cagney and Lacey, Quantum Leap, The Nanny, Dharma & Greg, Profiler, Judging Amy, Scrubs, The West Wing, Monk, Cold Case and Desperate Housewives. She has also appeared in movies such as Beetlejuice, Rumor Has It..., Mr. & Mrs. Smith, America's Sweethearts, and a notable cameo in The Wedding Singer, in which she innocently asked Billy Idol what the mile high club was.

== Filmography ==
=== Film ===
Year	Title	Role	Notes
1974	Indict and Convict	Barbara Mathews	TV film
1986	Soul Man	Dorothy Watson	
1988	Beetlejuice	Sarah Dean	
1988	Dangerous Curves	Mrs. Brooks	
1998	A Night at the Roxbury	Mabel Sanderson	
1998	Like Father, Like Santa	Ms. Fischer	TV film
1998	The Wedding Singer	Nice Lady on Plane	
1998	Perfect Prey	Mrs. Leary	TV film
1999	Lost & Found	Mrs. Millstone	
1999	The Bachelor	Mona Arden	
2000	Hanging Up	Angie	
2001	Just Ask My Children	Corene Oliver	TV film
2001	Comedy Central Thanxgiveaway: Home Fires	Evelyn Gordon	TV film
2002	Point of Origin	Gabby Finn	TV film
2004	The Affair	Charlene	
2004	Comedy Central Laughs for Life Telethon 2004	Sen. Langman	TV film
2006	The Last Time	Gladys	
2008	Broken Angel	Mrs. Kraus	
2009	Little Fish, Strange Pond	Landlord	
2009	Stellina Blue	Clare	
2009	Crossing Over	Judge Freeman	
2009	Labor Pains	Ann	
2009	Protection	Mrs. Shapiro	Short
2010	Letters to God	Olivia	
2017	A Moving Romance	Midge	TV film
2018	Anyone Home?	Mrs. Kakanian	

=== Television ===
Year	Title	Role	Notes
1965–68, 1970–71, 1973, 1994, 1996, 2010, 2024–2025	Days of Our Lives	Marie Horton	Regular role
1969	The Outcasts	Cora	Episode: "And Then There Was One"
1970	Gunsmoke	Abigail Hartly	Episode: "McCabe"
1971	The F.B.I.	Miss Evans	Episode: "Center of Peril"
1971	Bearcats!	Jessica Adams	Episode: "Assault on San Saba"
1972	Hawaii Five-O	Amy Carter	Episode: "R & R & R"
1974–1984	Search for Tomorrow	Stephanie Wyatt	Contract role
1986	Cagney & Lacey	Mrs Delicath	Episode: "A Safe Place"
1987	Hunter	Cynthia Jane Bartlett	Episode: "Double Exposure"
1987	CBS Schoolbreak Special	Mrs. George	Episode: "Juvi"
1987–91, 1997	General Hospital	Charlene Simpson	TV series
1988	Walt Disney's Wonderful World of Color	Janine	Episode: "Rock 'n' Roll Mom"
1989	CBS Summer Playhouse	Ilene Patterson	Episode: "B-Men"
1990	Columbo	Mrs. Rowe	Episode: "Columbo Goes to College"
1991	Quantum Leap	Margaret Twilly	Episode: "Play Ball"
1992	Rachel Gunn, R.N.	Amy Proctor	Episode: "I Dream of Squidhead"
1992	Empty Nest	Audrey	Episode: "Sayonara"
1992–93	Knots Landing	Mary Robeson	Recurring role
1994	The Nanny	Emma Trusdale	Episode: "The Show Must Go On"
1995	Acapulco Bay	Victoria	Main role
1996	The Jeff Foxworthy Show	Molly	Episode: "The Gift"
1997	Conan	Yantona	Episode: "Ransom"
1997	The Journey of Allen Strange	Irma Stephenson	Episode: "Space"
1997	Profiler	Judge Paramen	Episode: "Second Best"
1998	George and Leo	Lorna	Episode: "The Nine Wives of Leo Wagonman"
1998	Profiler	Judge Paramen	Episode: "The Root of All Evil"
1998	Beyond Belief: Fact or Fiction	Nanny / Maggie	Episode: "The Red Eyed Creature"
1998	Promised Land	Thelma Wicker	Episode: "Chasin' the Blues"
1998	Caroline in the City	Dorothy Baxter	Episode: "Caroline and the Big Night"
1999	Port Charles	Charlene Simpson	TV series
2002	Judging Amy	Betty	Episode: "Boston Terriers from France"
2002	Passions	Mona	3 episodes
2002	Scrubs	Mrs. Warner	Episode: "My Case Study"
2003	The West Wing	Gov. Wade	Episode: "Disaster Relief"
2004	Monk	Edna Coruthers	Episode: "Mr. Monk and the Employee of the Month"
2004	Drake & Josh	Josh's Driving Instructor	Episode: "Driver's License"
2005	Desperate Housewives	Ceal	Episode: "Color and Light"
2005	Cold Case	Nancy Walsh	Episode: "A Perfect Day"
2007	Boston Legal	Georgina Babineaux	Episode: "Angel of Death"
2007	In Case of Emergency	Elizabeth Yablonsky	Episodes: "The Good, the Bad and the Mob", "Disorder in the Court"
2007	'Til Death	Mrs. Wallach	Episode: "Performance Anxiety"
2007	Rules of Engagement	Mrs. Fulford	Episode: "Fix-Ups & Downs"
2007	Weeds	Nurse	Episode: "Protection"
2009	Ghost Whisperer	Myrna Cooperton	Episode: "This Joint's Haunted"
2009	Saving Grace	Susan	Episode: "She's a Lump"
2010	Outlaw	Dr. Seitz	Episode: "In Re: Jessica Davis"
2011	Dexter	Unnamed Docent	Episode: "The Angel of Death"
2012	GCB	Boofie Marfeson	Episode: "Hell Hath No Fury"
2012	Hot in Cleveland	Mrs. Filsinger	Episode: "Rubber Ball"
2012	Free Agents	Mrs. Claymore	Episode: "Nice Guys Finish at Some Point"
2013–14	Sam & Cat	Nona	Main role
2013–15	Hart of Dixie	Bettie Breeland	Recurring role
2015	The Millers	Mrs. Mueller	Episode: "Highway to the Manger Zone"
2016−2021	The Haves and the Have Nots	Pearl	Recurring role (seasons 3-8)
2016	Mistresses	Stephanie	Episode: "Back to the Start"
2016–19	Baskets	Maggie	Recurring cast, 12 episodes
2019	Bizaardvark	Joyce	Episode: "Eye of the Duckworth"
2019	Young Sheldon	Dorothy	Episode: "A Parasol and a Hell of an Arm"
2025	Matlock	Sister Peggy	Episode: "Harm Reduction"
