= Dan Ireland =

American-Canadian film producer & director (1949–2016)

- Born: Daniel Frederick Ireland; May 11, 1949; Portland, Oregon, U.S.
- Died: April 14, 2016 (aged 66); Los Angeles, California, U.S.
- Occupations: Director; producer
- Known for: Co-founder of the Seattle International Film Festival

Daniel Frederick Ireland (May 11, 1949 – April 14, 2016) was an American-Canadian film producer and director. He was the co-founder of the Seattle International Film Festival. Ireland began executive-producing films for Vestron Pictures in the 1980s, his first being John Huston's final feature, The Dead (1987). He also executive-produced multiple films by director Ken Russell, such as Salome's Last Dance (1987), The Lair of the White Worm (1988), The Rainbow (1989), and Whore (1991).

He made his feature film directorial debut with the drama The Whole Wide World (1996), followed by The Velocity of Gary (1998) and Jolene (2006).

== Early life ==
Ireland was born in 1949 (Note: Some sources list Ireland's birth date as May 11, 1958; however, official obituaries indicate he was 66 years old at the time of his death and that his birth year was in fact 1949.) in Portland, Oregon, the second of four children of Rainsford and Betty Ireland (née Shantz). When he was five years old, his mother moved to Vancouver, British Columbia, Canada, where Ireland spent the remainder of his childhood.

== Career ==
Ireland and Darryl MacDonald ran the Seattle International Film Festival for ten years. They were immigrated from Vancouver to take on the task of creating the festival, and opening a first run art theatre, The Egyptian. During his tenure, the festival selected and launched some films, including Blood Simple, The Stunt Man, The Empire Strikes Back, Alien, Poltergeist, Another Country and One False Move. Other ones including The Road Warrior, Choose Me, Kiss Of The Spider Woman, Ran, Soldier of Orange, Spetters and The Fourth Man. Ireland was awarded the Golden Calf Award (the Dutch equivalent to the Academy Award) for his contribution to advancing Dutch Films in 1983. His friendship with director Verhoeven helped save the distribution in America of the director's World War II saga Soldier of Orange.

Ireland became the head of film acquisition for Vestron Pictures in 1986. During his three year tenure, he spearheaded such projects for The Dead, Paperhouse, Salome's Last Dance, The Lair of the White Worm and The Rainbow. Other films Ireland acquired during his time at Vestron included Personal Services, Earth Girls Are Easy and Anna. After leaving Vestron Pictures, Ireland produced (with Ronaldo Vasconcellos) another film for director Ken Russell, Whore, and The Crew, for director Carl Colpaert at Cineville.

In 1995, Ireland made the transition from producer to director with The Whole Wide World (1996). It was Renée Zellweger's performance in this film that caught the eye of producer James L. Brooks and director Cameron Crowe, and led to her co-starring with Tom Cruise in Jerry Maguire (1996). The Whole Wide World was awarded Best New American Film at The Seattle International Film Festival, and won its actor Vincent D'Onofrio Best Actor for the role of Robert E. Howard, author of Conan the Barbarian, and Best Actress for Zellweger at the Mar del Plata Film Festival. Subsequent films directed by Ireland include The Velocity of Gary (1996), Passionada (2003), Mrs. Palfrey at the Claremont (2006), and Jolene (2008).

Ireland worked with Zellweger again when she executive-produced Living Proof, the true story of oncologist Dr. Dennis Slamon, who helped discover the cancer drug Herceptin. The film was also produced by Neil Meron and Craig Zadan. Ireland directed two short films, Hate From A Distance (2014), the story of racism as seen through the eyes of a child, made for the 50th Anniversary of the signing of the Civil Rights Act; and A Most Peculiar Man (2015) starring stage actor Alan Mandell, about the friendship of an elderly Holocaust survivor and a young man on the verge of suicide.

== Death ==
Ireland died in his Los Angeles home of a heart attack on April 14, 2016. Before Ireland's death, his next film was going to be Life Briefly, the true story of Brian Knapp, a young man who overcame blindness to become a professional drummer by the age of ten; he eventually became a guitar player who performed with Johnny Cash on stage seven times before his death at age fourteen.

Actress Jessica Chastain, whom Ireland directed in her first major film role in Jolene (2008), paid tribute to him following his death, writing: "When Dan entered a room, the sun shined. His laughter boomed with love. He had the biggest heart. Love you Danny boy."

The Louisiana International Film Festival created a scholarship in Ireland's name, which commemorates his dedication to new talent. Louisiana artists and filmmakers are eligible for consideration, and funds from the scholarship are dedicated towards an event, showcase or internship in Los Angeles on the recipient’s behalf. In April 2017, the inaugural Dan Ireland Award was presented by special guest Renée Zellweger to Atila Till for Kills on Wheels. In September 2017, the inaugural Dan Ireland Scholarship was awarded to Louisiana singer-songwriter and musician David Jones II, whose stage name is JST DAVID.

== Filmography ==
Table featuring feature films directed by Martin Scorsese
Year	Title	Director	Writer	Producer	Executive producer	Notes	Ref.
1987	The Dead	No	No	No	Yes		
1987	Anna	No	No	No	Yes		
1987	Salome's Last Dance	No	No	No	Yes		
1988	The Lair of the White Worm	No	No	No	Yes		
1988	The Rainbow	No	No	No	Yes		
1991	Whore	No	No	Yes	No		
1994	The Crew	No	No	Yes	No		
1996	The Whole Wide World	Yes	No	Yes	No		
1998	The Velocity of Gary	Yes	No	No	Yes		
2003	Passionada	Yes	No	No	No		
2006	Mrs. Palfrey at the Claremont	Yes	Yes	Yes	No		
2008	Jolene	Yes	No	No	No		
2008	Living Proof	Yes	No	No	No		
2014	Hate from a Distance	Yes	No	Yes	No	Short film	
2015	A Most Peculiar Man	Yes	No	Yes	No	Short film	
