= Angel's Egg =

1985 OVA film by Mamoru Oshii

- DVD cover art

天使のたまご (Tenshi no Tamago)
- Genre: Science fantasy
- Created by: Mamoru Oshii; Yoshitaka Amano
- Original video animation
- Directed by: Mamoru Oshii
- Produced by: Hiroshi Hasegawa; Masao Kobayashi; Kōki Miura; Yutaka Wada
- Written by: Mamoru Oshii
- Music by: Yoshihiro Kanno
- Studio: Studio Deen
- Licensed by: AUS: Umbrella Entertainment; NA: GKIDS; UK: Anime Limited
- Released: 15 December 1985
- Runtime: 71 minutes

Angel's Egg (Japanese: 天使のたまご, Hepburn: Tenshi no Tamago) is a Japanese animated experimental post-apocalyptic science fantasy OVA film written and directed by Mamoru Oshii. Released by Tokuma Shoten on 15 December 1985, the film was a collaboration between artist Yoshitaka Amano and Oshii. The film follows the bond between two nameless characters: a girl who protects an egg and a boy who has a dream about a bird. It was the first original project by Oshii and carries themes found in his other works.

In a radical departure from Oshii's previous work, Angel's Egg features little spoken dialogue, with a heavily allegorical story steeped in ambiguous imagery and recurrent Biblical allusions. The film originally struggled financially upon release with many viewers being confused over its supposed meaning, but it has since received acclaim as a cult classic.

A 4K remaster commemorating the film's 40th anniversary was screened at the 2025 Cannes Film Festival. The film made $1.6 million worldwide from this re-release.

== Plot ==
The setting of the film takes place in a primordial land, filled with trees, strange technology, a giant, mechanical eye, various ruins of buildings, and two nameless characters. One of these is a young girl who scavenges a desolate city while protecting a large egg, which she believes will hatch into an angel. The other is a young man who disembarks from a tank, carrying a large cross-shaped weapon.

The girl encounters the young man and runs away initially, after which the boy disappears. Later the girl sets her egg down while taking a break. The young man catches up to the girl and steals the egg briefly, giving it back after telling her to keep it closer to herself. She eventually lets him follow her, leading to their brief bonding. The young man wishes to break the egg to see what is inside. He recounts the story of Noah's Ark, but in his version, the dove that was released from the Ark never returned, and eventually the people on the ark forgot about the dove, as well as the world they came from. He ponders the world and existence, and theorizes that the bird never existed. The girl tells the boy that the bird did exist, and brings him to a fossil of a giant bird.

Later, the young man smashes the girl's egg while she sleeps. This prompts her to chase after him and ultimately fall into a body of water, where her final breath is transformed at the surface of the water into a large number of eggs. The young man, standing on a shore covered in bird feathers, observes the girl, now a stone statue, sitting on a throne among the other stone statues of people on the mechanical eye. Afterwards, the world shown in the film is revealed to be on top of an oblong shape, resembling a hull of an overturned ship.

== Cast ==
Character	Japanese voice actor	English voice actor
Girl	Mako Hyōdō	Brianna Knickerbocker
Boy	Jinpachi Nezu	Justice Slocum

== Production ==
Angel's Egg repurposes ideas that Oshii developed for a cancelled Lupin the Third film. Both concepts feature the theme of questioning existence (Lupin's existence in the cancelled film, and the bird from Noah's ark in Angel's Egg), and involve the fossil of an angel Oshii himself said that Angel's Egg was another attempt at the idea and anime critic Ryota Fujitsu has said that Angel's Egg (and the first Patlabor movie) would not have existed if Oshii had made the Lupin film. Oshii has also stated that the entire angel fossil concept used in Angel's Egg was directly taken from Lupin, and compares the relationship between the boy and girl to that in The Glass Menagerie by Tennessee Williams.

Many of the themes and elements in Angel's Egg were originally from Oshii's cancelled Lupin the 3rd film. However, only the angel fossil remains unchanged from its planned appearance.

The film is a collaboration between Amano and Oshii. Oshii originally intended on making a comedy film, starting with the girl first getting off a flying ark in front of a Japanese convenience store, but changed his mind and decided to make it a pure fantasy film after seeing Amano's art. Oshii said that he wanted to remove a narrative as much as possible, and keep the film simple, using animation as an expression to draw out a story, and fill it with symbolic expressions and metaphors "like Jung's archetypes and collective unconscious".

The documentation for the project was written in one night by Toshio Suzuki (producer) but Oshii was displeased with it and did not use it. However, the title of the film, Angel's Egg (天使のたまご, Tenshi no Tamago), was from Suzuki, where Oshii's original title was Aquatic City (水棲都市, Suisei Toshi).

Oshii began writing the script with the main theme of a dream seen by a girl, continuing from Urusei Yatsura 2: Beautiful Dreamer, but thinking that a script alone would not be enough to get the project approved, invited Amano to make image boards for the proposal. He also showed the image boards to the animators to get ideas from them. There was no definitive script, but rather a collection of ideas noted down like "annunciation" "ark" "setting sun" "a boy holding a cross riding a tank" which were immediately turned into storyboards, and then fitted together, which Oshii says had the intention of making a film without clear drama, made out of visual expressions, like one by Andrei Tarkovsky.

Amano had initially been slated to work on Oshii's cancelled Lupin film, which anime critic Ryota Fujitsu says makes it obvious that Angel's Egg was inherited from Lupin. While Amano was originally invited to work on character designs, Oshii liked his art enough that he ended up in the role of art direction, also designing image boards, and other things such as posters.

The angel fossil was later reused alongside other elements from Oshii's cancelled Lupin film in 009 RE:CYBORG, which Oshii was initially supposed to direct and participated in the script for, and was eventually directed by Kenji Kamiyama, a student of Oshii. Kamiyama describes this version of the angel fossil as indication of a god, but not of any particular religion. The angel fossil was also used in the tenth episode of Lupin the 3rd Part 6 which Oshii wrote the script for "Darwin's Bird" In this episode Fujiko Mine is hired by the archangel Michael to steal the angel fossil, which is actually that of the fallen angel Lucifer, on behalf of his master.

Nezu worked with Oshii once again in Patlabor 2: The Movie and Mako Hyōdō played a supporting role in The Sky Crawlers.

== Style ==
The film has elements that are not typical for anime film productions of that era. It uses a limited color palette making it almost monochrome. The film has very little dialogue. The film is unusual because it contains only 400 shots when the typical animation has three times that amount.

== Themes and interpretations ==
"I'm not a Christian, but I've been reading the Bible since my student days. I use it as a prototype for my stories; not for religious reasons, but for ideology and literary inspiration." – Mamoru Oshii in 1996

Angel's Egg touches on themes that are common in Oshii's films, including references to the Christian Bible, the symbolism of dreams, as well as the intersection of dreams and reality. Some of these motifs appear in his other works, such as 1984's Beautiful Dreamer. The New York Japan Society says the film is "An allegorical fantasy enriched by symbolism and biblical allusion."

Although some publications have indicated that the film is built on director Oshii's supposed loss of faith in Christianity, Oshii himself has stated otherwise in saying that he was not a Christian, but that he thought quotes from the Bible were interesting and had a friend who was Christian. The misconception that Oshii was a man of faith has its origins in an interview that was likely mistranslated, in which Oshii is reported to say, "I planned to enter a seminary at one point, but didn't." Which is then followed up by the interviewer asking, "Are you a Christian, or do you just like the Bible for its philosophy?" To which Oshii replies, "For its philosophy." In the same Animerica interview Oshii also said, "I'm not a Christian, but I've been reading the Bible since my student days".

In a 1996 interview with the magazine Animerica, Oshii stated that the film evoked elements that intrigued him, such as "Ruins; I like ruins; I like museums; I like fish; I like birds; I like water... and I like girls." He also stated that ruins appear to him in his dreams.

Oshii said in a 1985 interview with Animage that the contents of the egg are supposed to represent dreams and hopes, something that may or may not exist, and that while the girl believed in what was in it, by breaking the egg, the boy showed that what she believed in did not exist. Regarding the bird the boy talks about, though the girl shows the boy an angel fossil in order to convince him that the bird does exist, Oshii has stated that the angel is not the bird. Oshii also said that the ending was one with salvation for the girl, but he did not want it to be shown in a straightforward way, and made it hard to understand.

== Release ==
Angel's Egg was released in the direct-to-video format on 15 December 1985 by Tokuma Shoten. It was additionally given a limited theatrical release that same year. Although Angel's Egg was highly acclaimed by critics and people in the animation industry in Japan on release, it also resulted in Oshii being labeled as a director who made films hard to understand, which resulted in him being hired far less frequently for years up until he got involved with Patlabor. Speaking at an animation film festival in 1997 through a translator, Oshii explained the film did not do well financially upon release and was an obstacle to him getting work again for years.

The 71-minute OVA would later be used as the skeleton for the 1987 live-action independent film In the Aftermath directed by Carl Colpaert. Colpaert's movie occasionally intercuts with footage from Oshii's Angel's Egg with dubbed over dialogue, which does not appear in Oshii's film.

The film was released on Blu-ray disc in 2013 in Japan. Angel's Egg was screened at Japan Society on 14 October 2022 and later on 10 September 2023 with Amano in attendance. On 29 May 2024, GKIDS announced that they had acquired the North American distribution rights to the film, with the licensor planning to give the film a 4K restoration which will be supervised by Oshii as well as screening the film nationwide in theaters. This remaster would eventually be featured in the 2025 Cannes Film Festival, exhibiting under the Cinéma de la Plage section. The film also received a limited theatrical release in North American theatres on November 19, 2025, both subtitled and with a newly produced English dub.

== Reception ==
=== Japanese reception ===
The film saw mostly positive reception from critics and industry professionals on and around release.

Yoshikazu Yasuhiko said that the reason the film feels like something new is because it is not merely a montage of disjointed scenes, but a complete world depicted within 80 minutes. He also compared the art in the film to the modernism in Belladonna of Sadness, being beautiful but also dangerous.

Haruhiko Mikimoto expressed appreciation for the art direction, particularly having characters with color in front of monotone backgrounds, the use of silhouettes in the backgrounds, and the use of barely visible objects in the dark in backgrounds. He also said that Angel's Egg brought out the best merit of an OVA, which is letting the creator make what they want to make, and that he felt the quality of the film meant it would not be out of place in a movie theater.

Shoji Kokami had high praise for the film, saying that it is a "two-dimensional poem of images given form" that "should be valued as a pinnacle of the media of animation."

Anime critic and producer Noriaki Ikeda also had high praise for the film, saying the apocalyptic setting, religious aspects, and lack of life in it both appeals to and bewilders fans of science fiction. He also contrasted the film with Urusei Yatsura 2: Beautiful Dreamer and Dallos, saying that while they were about giving meaning to a fictional world, it makes an abnormal world to give the characters meaning.

The film has gained more critical acclaim from critics and industry professionals in later years, with people such as Shoji Kawamori, Ryu Mitsuse, Hideo Osabe, Takashi Murakami, and directors Shunji Iwai and Akiyoshi Imazeki heaping praise on it.

Hayao Miyazaki was more critical of the film, and recounts that Toru Horikoshi, who was a producer for Nippon TV at the time, fell asleep watching the film, and that while Michihiko Suwa of Yomiuri TV approved it for a TV broadcast, he said that he did not understand the film. Miyazaki himself said regarding the film that he "appreciates the effort, but it is not something others would understand" and of Oshii "he goes on a one-way journey without thinking of how to get back".

Oshii recounts that his mother said upon watching the film that nobody would watch his films anymore.

=== Western reception ===
Western critics found the film confusing, citing its allegory, symbolism, and ending, as the reasons. Brian Ruh stated that it was "one of the most beautiful and lyric films in the animated medium." Some western critics say that the film is difficult to understand, with visuals and narrative that is both cryptic, convoluted, and allegorical. Jason Thompson writing in Viz Media's online magazine J-pop compared the film's style to Night on the Galactic Railroad while noting that the meaning of the film may be elusive, stating "Angel's Egg stands as an evocation of a mood and world which is powerful in spite of -- perhaps because of -- not being consciously understood." Kara Dennison of Otaku USA said "Mamoru Oshii's 1985 collaboration with Yoshitaka Amano is one of the most beautiful anime committed to film."

Anime News Network writer Lynzee Loveridge compared the film's tone and style to Eiichi Yamamoto's Belladonna of Sadness and René Laloux's film Fantastic Planet and said "There is little else like in the animation medium and fans of thoughtful, experimental works can only hope that more legitimate exposure may lead to broader availability."

Helen McCarthy called it "an early masterpiece of symbolic film-making", stating that "its surreal beauty and slow pace created a Zen-like atmosphere, unlike any other anime". In his book Horror and Science Fiction Film IV, Donald C Willis described the film as "a haunting, poetic melancholic science-fantasy film, and–for non-Japanese-speaking viewers at least–a very cryptic one." Willis also included the film in his list of most memorable films from 1987 to 1997. In an article in Senses of Cinema on Oshii, Richard Suchenski stated that the film was Oshii's "purest distillation of both Oshii's visual mythology and his formal style". The review noted that "Patlabor 2 is more sophisticated, Ghost in the Shell is more important, and Avalon is more mythically complex but the low-tech, hand-drawn Angel's Egg remains Oshii's most personal film."

== See also ==
- Seraphim: 266613336 Wings

== Bibliography ==
- McCarthy, Helen (2009). 500 Essential Anime Movies: The Ultimate Guide. New York: Harper Design. ISBN 978-0-06-147450-7.
- Ruh, Brian (2004). Stray Dog of Anime: The Films of Mamoru Oshii. New York: Palgrave Macmillan. ISBN 978-1-4039-6334-5.
- Willis, Donald C. (1997). Horror and Science Fiction Films IV. Scarecrow Press. ISBN 0-8108-3055-8.
