= Elizabeth D'Onofrio =

American actress

- Occupations: Actress; producer; acting instructor
- Relatives: Vincent D'Onofrio (brother)

Elizabeth D'Onofrio is an American film producer, actress, and acting coach.

== Career ==
Recent acting roles include Romantic Rewrite, The Right Stuff, "The Neapolitan", Simple Things, Awaken the Dawn, Dear Angry (2005) and The Chocolate Fetish (2004). D'Onofrio was cast as Doris in National Geographic's The Right Stuff on Disney+.

As of 2004, D'Onofrio taught acting.

== Personal life ==
D'Onofrio lives in Fort Myers Beach, Florida.

== Filmography ==
=== Film ===
Year	Title	Role	Notes
1993	Household Saints	Mary	
1996	The Whole Wide World	Mrs. Smith	
1998	The Velocity of Gary	Dorothy	
2007	Simple Things	Mother	
2008	Slice	Dr. Alex Sanders	
2022	Romantic Rewrite	Aunt Edith	

=== Television ===
Year	Title	Role	Notes
2015	Alibi Boys	Aunt Griselda	Episode: "The Psychic with Seven Balls"
2018	The Neapolitan	Mrs. Castellano	Television film
2020	The Right Stuff	Doris	Episode: "Advent"
2025	Only Murders in the Building	Nonna	Season 5, multiple episodes
