= Passionada =

- Theatrical release poster
- Directed by: Dan Ireland
- Screenplay by: Jim Jermanok; Steve Jermanok
- Story by: David Bakalar
- Produced by: David Bakalar
- Starring: Jason Isaacs; Sofia Milos; Emmy Rossum; Theresa Russell; Seymour Cassel
- Cinematography: Claudio Rocha
- Edited by: Luis Colina
- Music by: Harry Gregson-Williams
- Production companies: Sandyo Productions; Fireworks Productions
- Distributed by: Samuel Goldwyn Films
- Release date: June 16, 2002
- Running time: 108 minutes
- Country: United States
- Languages: English; Portuguese
- Box office: $540,833

Passionada is a 2002 American romantic comedy film. It is directed by Dan Ireland and stars Jason Isaacs, Sofia Milos and Emmy Rossum, co-starring Seymour Cassel and Theresa Russell. The screenplay by Jim and Steve Jermanok is based on a story by producer David Bakalar. The film is set in New Bedford, Massachusetts, a formerly wealthy port town with a sizable population of Portuguese descent.

== Plot summary ==
Celia Amonte is a Portuguese American widow who lives in New Bedford, Massachusetts with her daughter Vicky; her late husband was a fisherman lost at sea. Vicky sneaks out of the house to go to a casino, where she meets Charlie Beck, a British card counter, and attempts to convince him to teach her his trade. Charlie is apprehended by the casino staff, and told that he can either work to find other card counters, or be banned from the casino. After accepting a ban, Charlie meets with his friends Daniel and Lois Vargas at the Shawmut Diner, where they attempt to convince him to stop card counting. Charlie goes to a Portuguese restaurant with Daniel and Lois, and becomes interested in Celia after seeing her sing fado. He repeatedly tries to date Celia, and is rebuffed. Charlie later finds Celia's address in the phone book and goes to her house, where he encounters Vicky. Vicky agrees to help Charlie pursue her mother in exchange for card counting lessons, and threatens to reveal his identity as a gambler should he refuse.

Vicky tells Charlie that her mother is interested in fishermen; Charlie lies to Celia and claims to be in town to open a fish-processing plant. Celia becomes increasingly interested in Charlie, and admits her feelings for him, and struggles since her husband's death, while on a date at Ned Point Light. After a festival, Vicky stays out all night at a casino, causing Celia to worry and go looking for her. While out, she sees Charlie with Lois in his car, and suspects an affair. Charlie reveals his lies to Celia and asks for her forgiveness; she tells him to never come to her house again. Devastated, Charlie prepares to leave New Bedford. Lois visits Celia at her home, and convinces her to take Charlie back. After singing one night, Celia follows a trail of fish on the ground to find Charlie, who has become a successful fisherman. He explains that he wants her back, and would be willing to do any job to be with her. She accepts him, and the two kiss.

Sometime later, Charlie is employed at the casino to find card counters, while Celia, now married to Charlie, is a singer at the casino.

== Cast ==
- Jason Isaacs as Charlie Beck, a card counter who wishes to date Celia, and takes advice from Vicky in exchange for card counting lessons
- Sofia Milos as Celia Amonte, a Portuguese American widow whose husband was lost at sea; she has refused to date since his death.
- Emmy Rossum as Vicky Amonte, Celia's daughter who agrees to help Charlie date her mother to learn how to count cards.
- Seymour Cassel as Daniel Vargas, a wealthy former gambler and friend of Charlie.
- Theresa Russell as Lois Vargas, Daniel's wife.
- Lupe Ontiveros as Angelica Amonte, Celia's mother-in-law and next-door-neighbor.

== Reception ==
On the review aggregator website Rotten Tomatoes, 57% of 46 critics' reviews are positive, with an average rating of 5.6/10. The website's consensus reads: "If Passionada doesn't quite spark its title emotion, the strong chemistry between its charming cast helps make this romantic dramedy a painless proposition." Metacritic, which uses a weighted average, assigned the film a score of 53 out of 100, based on 18 critics, indicating "mixed or average" reviews.
