= Nevada (1997 film) =

1997 American film directed by Gary Tieche

- Directed by: Gary Tieche
- Written by: Gary Tieche
- Produced by: Carl Colpaert
- Starring: Amy Brenneman; Kirstie Alley; Gabrielle Anwar; Saffron Burrows; Angus Macfadyen; Kathy Najimy; Dee Wallace; James Wilder; Bridgette Wilson; Ben Browder
- Cinematography: Nancy Schreiber
- Edited by: Rebecca Ross
- Music by: Dead Can Dance; Robert Perry
- Distributed by: Cineville
- Release date: April 1997 (U.S.)
- Running time: 108 minutes
- Country: United States
- Language: English

Nevada is a 1997 American drama film starring Amy Brenneman and directed by Gary Tieche.

== Plot ==
In Nevada, a mysterious woman named Chrysty appears, seemingly out of nowhere, wandering through the desert with no possessions and no fixed destination. She eventually makes her way to Silver City, a remote desert town in Nevada populated largely by women, as many of the men are away working.

At first, Chrysty is met with curiosity, hospitality, and suspicion in roughly equal measure. Some of the women in the town are quietly welcoming; others, especially one local woman named McGill, watch her with distrust. As Chrysty settles in—securing a job, finding a place to stay—the tension between her desire for anonymity and the town’s natural curiosity about her past begins to grow.

Gradually, parts of Chrysty’s earlier life start to come to light. Her arrival in Silver City acts as a catalyst: for Chrysty herself, for the relationships she builds (and trials she faces) in the town, and for the dynamics among the women who both resist and embrace her presence.

The film explores themes of identity, escape, reinvention, and the idea of “home” — what it means to belong, whether by choice or by circumstance.

== Cast ==
- Amy Brenneman as Chrysty
- Ben Browder as Shelby
- James Wilder as Rip
- Keith Anthony Bennett as Nate
- Kirstie Alley as McGill
- Bridgette Wilson as June
- Gabrielle Anwar as Linny
- Saffron Burrows as Quinn
- Kathy Najimy as Ruth
- Dee Wallace as Ruby
- Barbara Burton as Katie
- Emily Miller as Melanie
- Rachel Reber as Paula
- Charlie Crandell as Kimberly
- David Darmstaeder as Derrick
- Jordan Craddock as Derrick Jr.
- Garette Ratliff Henson as Weston
- Nathan Garcia as Cody
- Angus MacFadyen as West

== Production ==
Nevada was shot over 24 days in Randsburg, California, Ridgecrest, California and at the Hoover Dam, Clark County, Nevada.
