= In the Aftermath =

- Film poster
- Directed by: Carl Colpaert
- Screenplay by: Carl Colpaert; Mamoru Oshii
- Based on: Angel's Egg by Mamoru Oshii; Yoshitaka Amano
- Produced by: Tom Dugan
- Starring: Tony Markes; Rainbow Dolan
- Cinematography: Geza Sinkovics
- Edited by: Kevin Sewelson
- Music by: Anthony Moore
- Production companies: New World Pictures; Studio Deen
- Distributed by: New World Pictures
- Release date: 1988
- Running time: 72 minutes
- Countries: United States; Japan
- Language: English

In the Aftermath: Angels Never Sleep is a 1988 post-apocalyptic science fantasy film directed by Carl Colpaert, and released by New World Pictures. The film is notable for being loosely based on, as well as using footage from, Mamoru Oshii's 1985 OVA, Angel's Egg.

An angel (portrayed by Rainbow Dolan and voiced Katie Leigh) is sent to post-nuclear apocalypse earth to evaluate humanity's worthiness. Unwittingly following her is a soldier, Frank (Tony Markes), who has been scouring for any way to survive. As they keep meeting, they have no idea what is in store for their futures.

== Plot ==
An angel nursing a large egg is sent to an irradiated earth by her older brother Jonathan, with orders to see if mankind can be saved. On earth, two surviving soldiers, Frank and Goose, scavenge for supplies, oxygen, and water. Goose finds a mysterious feather fall from the sky, but Frank tells him to just continue onward. They find an abandoned building and Frank goes further in. Frank runs into a reclusive and violent soldier. The recluse knocks Frank out and steals his hazmat suit. Soon after, the recluse impersonates Frank and extorts Goose. Goose is shot dead and Frank carries his body to an isolated shelter. As Frank struggles to survive, the angel appears to him in a vision, as she then deliberates the consequences of using her power to rescue the human race.

Frank wakes up in an enclosed clinic and apparently healed from various injuries. The doctor who nursed him back to health, Sarah Fallsburg, comes in and states she locked Frank in a room to protect his supply of clean air. Angel reports back to her brother, who continue to muse about what to do with her egg. They see phantoms of prior soldiers and shadowy fish, looking on with fear. Back on earth, Frank and Sarah share a cordial toast. Frank heads out of the room to play her a song on the piano. Sarah is reminded of her life before the apocalypse and sees the angel walking near the ruins. Angel interprets the song as a call to her and falls into a trance. Coming out of it, she muses more on her status and how the song affected her. Frank cuts off the song after noticing Sarah leave his gaze. Sarah states she was only wistful and the two head to bed. The angel also heads to rest after a long day as well.

Jonathan takes the egg from her as she rests. Missing her egg, the angel screams loud enough to wake up Frank from a night's sleep. The angel blames herself for losing the egg and heads to Jonathan to apologize. Jonathan decides to be lenient on his sister and gives her back the egg. Frank heads out to find the angel and she rushes to him. Finally catching up, the angel explains to Frank some of her true nature and hands him the egg. Frank lightheartedly accepts her story and takes the egg back with him to the ruins. Sarah finds Frank holding the angel's egg and they both stare at it with intrigue. In the angel's world, Jonathan says goodbye to the angel. He urges her to head on her own way and take flight, as she then jumps off cliff. She falls deep into a dark river and drowns, but her last breath births more eggs. The angel's narration remarks on Jonathan continuing to stand guard on an isolated shore.

The film ends with an angel's feather reaching Frank and Sarah. The egg activates its power and makes their air breathable once more. A new angel is being incubated in an egg, with an identical form to the old one.

== Cast ==
- Tony Markes as Frank
- Rainbow Dolan as Angel (live action)
  - Katie Leigh as Angel (voice, animation) (corresponds to Girl in Angel's Egg)
- Ian Ruskin as Jonathan (voice, animation) (corresponds to Boy in Angel's Egg)
- Filiz Tully as Dr. Sarah Fallsburg
- Kenneth McCabe as Goose
- Kurtiss J. Tews as Psycho soldier
- Edward Holm as Soldier corpse 1
- Bryan Ellenburg as Soldier corpse 2 (as "Brian Ellenburg")
- Mike Hickam as Officer corpse

== Production ==
In the Aftermath was shot on a low budget, and used live-action segments in order to pair it with footage from Angel's Egg, which the studio acquired in a distribution bundle, and ended up paying very little for the rights to. Neither director Colpaert nor producer Tom Dugan understood the original film, calling it "incomprehensible," and opted to shoot live-action segments in order for it to make more sense to audiences.

The cast and crew working on the live-action segments had no idea how their footage would be cut, and were given very little direction. In addition to dubbing over the angel in the animated segments, Katie Leigh dubbed over the dialog of Rainbow Dolan, who portrayed the angel in the live-action segments. Edward Holm and Bryan Ellenburg were both production assistants and on-screen extras.

The live-action portions of the film were shot at the abandoned Kaiser Steel mill in Fontana, California. The footage from Angel's Egg is used to portray the angel's home world, with some portions edited over the live action footage to represent the angel's true form. The angel's live-action costume and all the weapons were designed to mimic similar ones in the cartoon. The song Frank plays on the piano is called "Carnavalito Tango" by Horatio Moscovici.

== Release ==
The film was initially released in North America on VHS by New World Video on February 24, 1988. A VHS release in the United Kingdom followed in December, 1988. In the Aftermath also had a limited theatrical run in Australia in 1988. Code Red released the film on region 1 DVD on December 5, 2017.

In 2019, In the Aftermath was released on Blu-ray with a new 2K scan by Arrow Video.
