= Gas Food Lodging =

1992 American drama film

- Theatrical release poster
- Directed by: Allison Anders
- Screenplay by: Allison Anders
- Based on: Don't Look and It Won't Hurt by Richard Peck
- Produced by: Carl Colpaert
- Starring: Brooke Adams; Ione Skye; Fairuza Balk
- Cinematography: Dean Lent
- Edited by: Tracy Granger
- Music by: J Mascis
- Distributed by: Cineville
- Release dates: February 24, 1992 (Berlin); July 10, 1992 (United States)
- Running time: 101 minutes
- Country: United States
- Languages: English; Spanish
- Budget: $1.3 million
- Box office: $1.3 million

Gas Food Lodging is a 1992 American drama film written and directed by Allison Anders, based on the novel Don't Look and It Won't Hurt by Richard Peck. Starring Brooke Adams, Ione Skye, and Fairuza Balk, the film follows a waitress trying to find romance while raising two daughters in a trailer park in a small desert town in New Mexico.

Gas Food Lodging premiered at the Sundance Film Festival in January 1992, where it was nominated for the Grand Jury Prize, and was screened at the 42nd Berlin International Film Festival on February 24, 1992, where it was nominated for the Golden Bear.

The film was theatrically released in the United States on July 10, 1992, to critical acclaim. At the 8th Independent Spirit Awards, Balk won for Best Female Lead, while the film earned nominations in four other categories, Best Film, Best Director, and Best Screenplay for Anders, and Best Supporting Female for Adams.

== Plot ==
Nora, a waitress with two teenage daughters, struggles to raise them in a trailer park as a single parent after her husband abandons the family. After repeatedly skipping school to go on dates, Trudi, the elder daughter, quits school and gets a job as a waitress alongside her mother. Meanwhile, the younger daughter, Shade, spends most of her time watching the movies of Mexican film star Elvia Rivero and dreams of finding a boyfriend for her mother.

After being dumped by the boy she was seeing, Trudi meets Dank, a British petrologist, at the restaurant where she's working. They eventually sleep together, and she tells him that her promiscuity is caused by the fact that she lost her virginity in a gang rape perpetrated by local boys she knew. Returning home the following night, her mother tells her that she has one month to find a new home.

Shade tries to seduce Darius, her friend, by dressing up in a wig and costume à la Olivia Newton-John, Darius's supposed dream girl, at her sister's suggestion. After her seduction attempt fails, presumably because he is gay, she runs into Javier, the local projectionist, who teases her over her outfit before giving her a ride home on his bike. Afterwards she sets her mother up on a date with Raymond, a married man who was revealed earlier in the film to be having an intermittent affair with her mother. As they do not want to reveal their connection to the eavesdropping Shade, they make wry conversation where Raymond claims to work as a gravedigger and Nora as a brain surgeon.

Trudi discovers she is pregnant with Dank's child, but when he fails to return from an expedition, decides to go to Dallas and give up her child for adoption rather than have an abortion. While Trudi is away, Nora begins an affair with Hamlet Humphrey, a man who installs satellite dishes, while the girls' biological father, John, reappears.

Shade falls in love with Javier and tries to reconnect with her father. Initially disturbed by Hamlet, she warms to him after he reveals that he is familiar with the movies of Elvia Rivero and compares Nora to her.

Shade goes to Dallas with her mother and Hamlet for the birth of Trudi's baby. After giving birth to a daughter, Trudi tells Shade that she'll be staying in the city, as their home holds too many bad memories for her. On their way home, Shade spots a sign advertising day-glo rocks like the one Dank gave her sister. She goes to confront Dank but instead learns that he was killed in an accident while looking for rocks. Walking off into the desert, Shade realizes that Dank always loved Trudi and vows to eventually tell her what happened.

== Cast ==
- Brooke Adams as Nora
- Ione Skye as Trudi
- Fairuza Balk as Shade
- Robert Knepper as Dank
- David Lansbury as Hamlet (David Landsbury)
- Chris Mulkey as Raymond
- Donovan Leitch as Darius
- Julie Condra as Tanya
- Jacob Vargas as Javier
- Laurie O'Brien as Thelma
- Adam Biesk as Brett
- James Brolin as John Evans
- J Mascis as Cecil

In addition, Adams' daughter, Josie Lynne, appears as Trudi at 2 years; Skye and Leitch are real life siblings.

== Soundtrack ==
The Gas Food Lodging original soundtrack album was released by Mute Records via Elektra Entertainment in 1992, featuring songs by Nick Cave and the Bad Seeds, Victoria Williams, Velvet Monkeys and Crime and the City Solution. J. Mascis of Dinosaur Jr., along with Barry Adamson, contributed several tracks from their original score. Mascis also appears in a cameo at the end of the film as the man who explains what happened to Dank.

== Reception ==
Hal Hinson of The Washington Post wrote that "It's a great movie about making do."

Janet Maslin of The New York Times wrote that "there are subtly etched characters, effortlessly fine performances, and a moving story that is not easily forgotten."

On the review aggregator website Rotten Tomatoes, 83% of 18 critics' reviews are positive. Metacritic, which uses a weighted average, assigned the film a score of 78 out of 100, based on 23 critics, indicating "generally favorable" reviews.

== Home media ==
Gas Food Lodging was released on DVD region 1 in the United States and Canada on September 23, 2003 via Sony Pictures Home Entertainment It was again made available in region 1 as part of the Sony Choice Collection on April 3, 2012.

The film was made available for the first time on Blu-ray format in the U.S. and Canada via the Sony Choice Collection on April 4, 2017. The set contains the 1080p transfer, 2.0 DTS-HD Master Audio and English SDH subtitles and no special features.

In November 2018, the Arrow Films subsidiary, Arrow Academy, released a special edition Blu-ray of the film featuring a remastered 1080p transfer and the original uncompressed 2.0 audio, as well as several new special features.

== See also ==
- List of films featuring the deaf and hard of hearing
