= Novalyne Price Ellis =

American writer and educator (1908–1999)

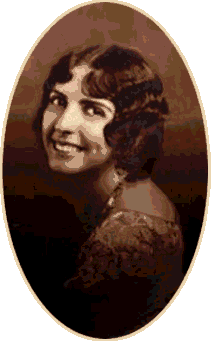
- Novalyne Price Ellis, ca. 1930s
- Born: March 9, 1908
- Died: March 30, 1999 (aged 91)
- Notable works: One Who Walked Alone

Novalyne Price Ellis (March 9, 1908 – March 30, 1999) was an American high school teacher and writer. She is best known as the author of One Who Walked Alone, her memoir about her relationship with pulp fiction writer Robert E. Howard, which was adapted into the film The Whole Wide World (1996).

== Early life and education ==
Price was for the most part raised on a farm in Brownwood, Texas. With aspirations of becoming a writer, Price became a school teacher to pay for her education at Daniel Baker College and later Louisiana State University.

== Career ==
Price taught English, public speaking and history between 1934 and 1936 at Cross Plains High School.

Cross Plains was also home to writer Robert E. Howard, who lived with his mother. After she began teaching, Price persisted in trying to meet him to get advice on becoming a writer, and finally went to his home uninvited.

Common interests and personal chemistry created a strong bond of friendship between them. Despite personality differences, misunderstandings, and unsuccessful attempts to bring their relationship beyond casual dating, Price and Howard remained close until Howard's suicide in 1936.

After Howard's death, Price shifted her focus to teaching. She taught at Cathedral and Lafayette High Schools.

Price's love of teaching and gift at speechwriting was recognized in 1981 with her admittance into the National Forensic Hall of Fame.

Throughout her life, Price published a number of articles and short stories, but it is her 1986 memoir, One Who Walked Alone, about her relationship with Robert E. Howard for which she is best known. The 1996 movie The Whole Wide World, is a direct adaptation of One Who Walked Alone, with Price played by actress Renée Zellweger and Howard played by Vincent D'Onofrio. The co-producers of the film, Benjamin Mouton and Michael Scott Myers, were both former students of Price, with Mouton playing her boyfriend Clyde.

== Personal life and death ==
On October 2, 1942 Price married John Douglas Robarts. Robarts was a Second Lieutenant serving in the US Army Infantry. They adopted a child, Marvin Douglas. Price and Robarts were divorced in May 1946.

While working as a teacher at Daniel Baker College, Price met and, in 1947, married William Ellis. Price and Ellis resided in Louisiana and had one son, Marvin Douglas Ellis, born in 1949. Her marriage to Ellis lasted forty-seven years, until Ellis' death in 1994.

Price continued living alone in Lafayette, Louisiana until her death at age 91 on March 30, 1999.

== Works ==
- A Handbook for Student Teachers of Speech (1957), Lafayette Senior High School, Lafayette, La
- One Who Walked Alone: Robert E. Howard, The Final Years (1986)
- Day of the Stranger: Further Memories of Robert E. Howard (1989)
