= The Velocity of Gary =

- Theatrical release poster
- Directed by: Dan Ireland
- Screenplay by: James Still
- Based on: The Velocity of Gary (Not His Real Name) by James Still
- Produced by: Carl Colpaert
- Starring: Vincent D'Onofrio; Salma Hayek; Thomas Jane; Olivia d'Abo
- Narrated by: Vincent D'Onofrio
- Cinematography: Claudio Rocha
- Edited by: Luis Colina; Debra Goldfield
- Music by: Peitor Angell
- Production companies: Cineville; Columbia TriStar Home Video; Dan Lupovitz Productions; Ventanarosa Productions
- Distributed by: Sony Pictures
- Release dates: September 22, 1998 (SSIFF); July 16, 1999 (United States)
- Running time: 97 minutes
- Country: United States
- Language: English
- Budget: $4 million
- Box office: $34,145

The Velocity of Gary, also known as The Velocity of Gary* *(Not His Real Name), is a 1998 American drama film directed by Dan Ireland and written by James Still, based on his homonymous play. It stars Thomas Jane in the title role, along with Salma Hayek and Vincent D'Onofrio.

The film was screened at the 1998 San Sebastián International Film Festival, and was released in Los Angeles and New York City on July 16, 1999.

== Plot summary ==
Gary (not his real name, which is never revealed) is a hustler walking through the streets of New York City, looking for business. On the way, he saves Kid Joey, a young deaf transvestite who just arrived in New York, from a group of gay bashers, but he regrets it afterwards because Kid Joey becomes infatuated with Gary and follows him everywhere. Gary introduces him to his friends: Valentino, a former porn star, and Mary Carmen, a Mexican young woman who works as a doughnut shop waitress and is in love with Valentino, with whom she has been living for some time. Together they form a bohemian family, which includes Veronica, a still-active porn star, and Nat, a tattoo artist. Gary is also in love with Valentino, who is dying of AIDS. Through the stages of the disease, Mary Carmen and Gary argue over what kind of care he should be receiving, and who is going to supply that care. As Valentino draws near death, Mary Carmen finds out she is carrying Valentino's baby. The three take stock of themselves and their relationships with one another.

== Cast ==
- Vincent D'Onofrio as Valentino
- Salma Hayek as Mary Carmen
- Thomas Jane as Gary
- Olivia d'Abo as Veronica
- Ethan Hawke as Nat
- Chad Lindberg as Kid Joey
- Jason Cutler as Romaine
- Shawn Michael Howard as Coco
- Elizabeth D'Onofrio as Dorothy
- Hakan D'Onofrio as Running Boy
- Keegan de Lancie as Choir Boy
- Ravell Dameron as Receptionist in Clinic
- Yvette Diaz as Young Mary Carmen
- Marion Eaton as Miss Sweetheart
- Phillip Esposito as Phone Sex Guy
- Luchisha Evans as Waitress

== Reception ==
Review aggregation website Rotten Tomatoes gives the film a rating of 22% based on reviews from 18 critics.

Roger Ebert gave the film 2 out of 4 stars, saying "It's more fun to see conventional characters break the rules than for outlaws to follow them." He further commented, "there is never quite the feeling that these people occupy a real world; their colorful exteriors are like costumes, and inside are simply actors following instructions." TV Guide was more positive, writing "Once the noise dies down enough that you can concentrate on the characters, a nicely acted, three-way drama is allowed to emerge. Leads Jane, D'Onofrio and Hayek throw themselves fearlessly into their roles (perhaps a little well-placed trepidation might have quieted Hayek down a bit, but that's a relatively minor complaint), and have a series of genuinely touching scenes together." The review added "this doomed love story stands firmly in the tradition of Midnight Cowboy, driven by the corrosive effects of street life and the fragile alliances that protect down-and-outers against an uncaring world."
