= Swimming with Sharks =

1994 film by George Huang

Swimming With Sharks
- Theatrical release poster
- Directed by: George Huang
- Written by: George Huang
- Produced by: Steve Alexander; Joanne Moore
- Starring: Kevin Spacey; Frank Whaley; Michelle Forbes; Benicio del Toro; Jerry Levine; T.E. Russell; Roy Dotrice
- Cinematography: Steven Finestone
- Edited by: Ed Marx
- Music by: Tom Hiel
- Distributed by: Trimark Pictures
- Release dates: September 10, 1994 (TIFF); April 21, 1995
- Running time: 93 minutes
- Country: United States
- Language: English
- Budget: $700,000
- Box office: $382,928

Swimming with Sharks (also known as The Boss and Buddy Factor) is a 1994 American satirical black comedy film written and directed by George Huang and starring Kevin Spacey, Frank Whaley and Michelle Forbes.

== Plot ==
Buddy Ackerman, an influential movie mogul, hires Guy, a naïve young writer, as his assistant. Guy, who has just graduated from film school, believes that his new job is a golden opportunity. Despite warnings from Rex, the outgoing assistant who has become hardened under Buddy's reign, Guy remains optimistic.

Buddy turns out to be the boss from hell; he treats Guy like a slave, subjects him to sadistic (and public) verbal abuse, and has him bending over backward to do meaningless errands that go beyond just his work life. Guy is humiliated and forced to bear the brunt of his insults. Guy's only solace is his new girlfriend Dawn, a producer at Buddy's firm. When Buddy apparently fires Guy in a phone call, Guy finally snaps and takes Buddy hostage in order to exact revenge. He ties Buddy up and subjects him to severe beatings, torture and mind games. It is later revealed that due to a botched call waiting function on Buddy's home phone, Guy hears Buddy and Dawn arranging a rendezvous at Buddy's house.

Once in Guy's power, Buddy reveals for the first time a human, vulnerable side. He tells Guy that his wife had been shot, raped, and murdered on Christmas Eve twelve years prior, and reveals that he, too, was once a bullied assistant to powerful, tyrannical men and spent a decade putting up with such abuse to become successful himself. He also posits that abusing Guy was his way of teaching Guy that he must earn his success. Dawn arrives at the scene to find Guy aiming a gun at Buddy's face and insists that she had only agreed to see Buddy as a way of helping Guy's career. Dawn pleads with Guy to put down the gun, whereupon Buddy tells Guy that he has to pull the trigger in order to get ahead in the business. After a moment's indecision, Buddy screams at Guy to shoot, which Guy does.

It is revealed that Guy killed Dawn, after discovering she used sex for her own career for her own script, completely shattering Guy's illusions on love and loyalty. Dawn is blamed for kidnapping and torturing Buddy, and Guy subsequently promoted. Later, Guy coldly tells a former colleague to find out what he really wants and then do anything to get it, echoing the numerous times Buddy told Guy. A beaten up Buddy then passes by Guy's office, making eye contact with him and silently gesturing to call him into his office for a meeting. Guy excuses himself and goes into Buddy's office, ignoring his ringing telephone. Buddy shuts his office doors as other employees walk by.

== Cast ==
- Kevin Spacey as Buddy Ackerman
- Frank Whaley as Guy
- Michelle Forbes as Dawn Lockard
- Benicio del Toro as Rex
- T.E. Russell as Foster Kane
- Roy Dotrice as Cyrus Miles
- Matthew Flynt as Manny
- Patrick Fischler as Moe
- Jerry Levine as Jack

== Production ==
George Huang decided to write the script after having a conversation with Robert Rodriguez. Rodriguez was in Los Angeles after his film El Mariachi brought him to the attention of Sony Pictures, where he befriended Huang. Huang told Rodriguez of his frustrations with filmmaking and was thinking of compiling stories from friends working for high-powered Hollywood executives, as well as stories based on his own experiences of being an assistant, into a book called Stories from Hollywood Hell. Rodriguez encouraged him to quit his post at Sony and pursue writing full-time so Huang could produce a script to direct himself.

Huang's resultant script, Reel Life, was picked up by Cineville executive Frank Evers, who brought in financing from independent investors, and significant production support from Sony Pictures Entertainment. The film was subsequently sold to Trimark Pictures (later assumed by Lionsgate in 2000). Cineville produced the film with Carl Colpaert, chairman of Cineville and Steve Alexander overseeing production.

Although writer George Huang himself worked as an assistant for Barry Josephson, who was the Senior Vice President of Development at Sony Pictures at the time, some have suggested that Buddy's character was inspired by real life movie mogul Scott Rudin, while others suggest that he is based on producer Joel Silver, with Guy being based on Alan Schechter, Silver's assistant in the early 1990s.

The director Buddy hires in the film, Foster Kane, is named after Orson Welles' character in the 1941 film Citizen Kane, Charles Foster Kane.

== Reception ==
On Rotten Tomatoes, the film has an approval rating of 76% based on reviews from 38 critics. The site's consensus states: "Swimming With Sharks is a smart, merciless Hollywood satire that's darkly hilarious and observant, thanks to Kevin Spacey's performance as ruthless studio mogul Buddy Ackerman." On Metacritic it has a score of a 66% based on reviews from 14 critics, indicating "generally favorable reviews".

Praise was given to Spacey’s performance in particular. Owen Gleiberman of Entertainment Weekly wrote: "The producer as megalomaniacal cutthroat — the devil with a cellular phone — is, by now, a standard figure of Hollywood satire. But Kevin Spacey takes this archetypal jerk to new levels of tyrannical bravado in the exuberantly nasty Swimming With Sharks". Gleiberman said the character of Guy needed more fleshing out and ultimately gave the film a grade of B.

Many noted the film’s nods to The Player, a Hollywood satire that debuted two years prior. Variety wrote that the film’s "escalating face-off is climaxed by an unexpected arrival, and [its] surprise ending truly does The Player one better in its evaluation of how self-centered, amoral and insular Hollywood can be". Janet Maslin of The New York Times commented: "Mr. Whaley slyly captures the yes-man who happily eases into his boss's arrogant habits as the story goes on".

Roger Ebert gave it three out of four stars. Though he found the ending to be implausible, he said: "The best parts of Swimming With Sharks are in the details -- in how Guy develops telephone and lying skills, or how Buddy manipulates the phones. Eventually, Guy learns the biggest lesson of all from Buddy, and in the dark humor of that logic, the film finds its conclusion". Ebert concluded that the film’s "plot may be overwritten and the ending may be less than satisfying, but [Huang’s] eye and ear are right. In Hollywood, where power is the ultimate aphrodisiac, it is also the ultimate excuse for almost any conceivable behavior. Powerful executives, agents and stars behave the way they do - because they can. Huang finds great humor in that situation, and, unless I am mistaken, some quiet bitterness as well".

The film gained new significance in 2017 when the Harvey Weinstein abuse and sexual misconduct cases became public and the MeToo movement went viral, in addition to allegations of Spacey's own misconduct and Hollywood producer Scott Rudin's reported history of abuse of his staff. Writer and producer Angelina Burnett shared on Twitter: "When I started out in this business Swimming with Sharks was required viewing. Veteran assistants recommended it as a way to emotionally prepare for what was coming. It was near guaranteed you were gonna get screamed at, and it was a badge of honor to be able to take it..." Said Huang in a 2018 interview: "It does sort of frighten me that people see the film as a primer. It isn’t proscriptive. I was merely holding a mirror up to the way it works. It was supposed to be a cautionary tale, not a how-to — but I still had agents and managers and producers calling me and saying, 'Hey, can I get a copy of the film? We want to show it to our trainees.' They were using it for instruction".

The film is recognized by American Film Institute in these lists:

- 2003: AFI's 100 Years...100 Heroes & Villains:
  - Buddy Ackerman – Nominated Villain

== Home media ==
Swimming with Sharks was first released on DVD by Trimark Home Video on August 12, 1998. For the film's tenth anniversary, Lionsgate Home Entertainment released a Special Edition DVD on June 7, 2005. The DVD includes audio commentary from Huang, Whaley and Spacey, as well as featurettes including "Back to the Tank: 10 Years Later", a retrospective piece about the making of the film. It received a Blu-ray release on July 19, 2021, from UK company Fabulous Films.

== Stage adaptation ==
A stage adaptation penned by Michael Lesslie had its world premiere at London's Vaudeville Theatre in October 2007. The play starred Christian Slater as Buddy, Matt Smith as Guy, Arthur Darvill as Rex and Helen Baxendale as Dawn. Academy Award nominee Demián Bichir opened a Spanish version of the play in Mexico City in January 2012.

A Singapore theatre company, PANGDEMONiUM!, opened the play in Singapore at Drama Centre from 20 September to 7 October 2012. The play starred Adrian Pang as Buddy, George Young as Guy and Janice Koh as Dawn.

== Television adaptation ==
In 2022, an adaptation written by Kathleen Robertson streamed on The Roku Channel after premiering at South by Southwest. The adaptation stars Diane Kruger and Kiernan Shipka.
