= Delusion (1991 film) =

- Directed by: Carl Colpaert
- Written by: Carl Colpaert; Kurt Voss
- Produced by: William Ewart; Dan Hassid
- Starring: Jennifer Rubin; Jim Metzler; Kyle Secor; Richard Jordan; Robert Costanzo; Jerry Orbach
- Cinematography: Geza Sinkovics
- Edited by: Mark Allan Kaplan
- Music by: Barry Adamson
- Production company: Cineville
- Distributed by: I.R.S. Releasing
- Release date: June 7, 1991 (New York City)
- Running time: 88 minutes
- Country: United States
- Language: English

Delusion is a 1991 American crime thriller film directed by Carl Colpaert.

== Plot ==
An embezzler driving through the Nevada desert picks up a Las Vegas showgirl and her psychotic boyfriend after their vehicle crashes. The boyfriend, a not-very-bright hitman, has no intention of letting him get away with the stolen cash. Alliances between the three shift as they face further complications in their attempt to leave the desert alive. The philosophy of Friedrich Nietzsche plays a minor role toward the film's end.
