= The Whole Wide World =

- Theatrical release poster
- Directed by: Dan Ireland
- Written by: Michael Scott Myers
- Based on: One Who Walked Alone by Novalyne Price Ellis
- Produced by: Carl Colpaert; Dan Ireland; Vincent D'Onofrio; Kevin Reidy
- Starring: Vincent D'Onofrio; Renée Zellweger; Ann Wedgeworth; Harve Presnell; Benjamin Mouton
- Cinematography: Claudio Rocha
- Edited by: Luis Colina
- Music by: Harry Gregson-Williams; Hans Zimmer (uncredited)
- Production companies: The Kushner-Locke Company; Cineville
- Distributed by: Sony Pictures Classics
- Release dates: January 1996 (Sundance); December 20, 1996 (United States)
- Running time: 106 minutes
- Country: United States
- Language: English
- Budget: $1.35 million
- Box office: $375,757

The Whole Wide World is a 1996 American independent biographical film produced and directed by Dan Ireland in his directorial debut. It depicts the relationship between pulp fiction writer Robert E. Howard (Vincent D'Onofrio) and schoolteacher Novalyne Price Ellis (Renée Zellweger).

The film was adapted by Michael Scott Myers from Ellis's memoir One Who Walked Alone.

== Premise ==
In 1933 Texas school teacher and aspiring writer Novalyne Price is introduced by friends to pulp fiction writer Robert E. Howard. A relationship soon develops between the two but, it is doomed by personality conflicts and life events, such as the terminal illness of Howard's mother.

== Cast ==
- Vincent D'Onofrio as Robert E. "Bob" Howard
- Renée Zellweger as Novalyne Price
- Libby Villari as Etna Reed Price, Novalyne's mother
- Ann Wedgeworth as Mrs. Howard
- Harve Presnell as Dr. Howard
- Benjamin Mouton as Clyde Smith
- Michael Corbett as Mayor Booth Adams
- Helen Cates as Enid

Cast notes

- Olivia d'Abo was intended for the role of Novalyne Price but was pregnant when shooting began.

== Soundtrack ==
Original music was provided by Harry Gregson-Williams and his mentor Hans Zimmer. This was their first collaboration as mentor and protégé.

== Reception ==
The film holds a score of 81% – indicating "Fresh" – on review aggregator Rotten Tomatoes, based on 17 reviews with an average rating of 7.0/10.

== Legacy ==
When auditioning for the film Jerry Maguire, Zellweger met director Cameron Crowe several times but had trouble convincing him that she could play "a 20-something woman" rather than a girl. This was solved by Zellweger's agent sending Crowe a tape of The Whole Wide World.

== Awards and honors ==
Nominated

- Grand Jury Prize at the 1996 Sundance Film Festival
- Best Female Lead for Renée Zellweger at the 1997 Independent Spirit Awards
- Best First Screenplay for Michael Scott Myers at the 1997 Independent Spirit Awards
- Best Film at the 1996 Verona Love Screens Film Festival

Won

- American Independent Special Jury Prize at the 1996 Seattle International Film Festival
- Best Actor for Vincent D'Onofrio (Golden Space Needle Award) at the 1996 Seattle International Film Festival
- Best Actress for Renée Zellweger at the 1996 Mar del Plata Film Festival
- Best Actor for Vincent D'Onofrio at the 1998 Lone Star Film & Television Awards
- Best Screenplay for Michael Scott Myers at the 1998 Lone Star Film & Television Awards
- Best Cinematography for Claudio Rocha at the 1996 Ft Lauderdale International Film Festival
