= One Who Walked Alone =

1986 memoir of Robert E. Howard by Novalyne Price Ellis

One Who Walked Alone: Robert E. Howard, The Final Years
- Dust-jacket from the first edition
- Author: Novalyne Price Ellis
- Cover artist: Richard Berry
- Language: English
- Subject: Biography, Robert E. Howard
- Publisher: Donald M. Grant, Publisher, Inc.
- Publication date: 1986
- Publication place: United States
- Media type: Print (hardback)
- Pages: 347 pp
- ISBN: 0-937986-78-X
- OCLC: 14817410

One Who Walked Alone: Robert E. Howard, The Final Years is a memoir of Robert E. Howard by Novalyne Price Ellis. Donald M. Grant, Publisher, Inc. published the book in 1986 with an edition of 800 copies. The book was adapted into the film The Whole Wide World in 1996. Grant has reprinted the book four times: 1988 (550 copies), 1998 (500 copies) and twice more. Starting with the third printing, the dust jacket was changed to include a picture of Renée Zellweger from her role in The Whole Wide World.
