= Carl Colpaert =

American film director

Carl-Jan Colpaert
- Born: Belgium
- Occupations: Film director, producer, writer

Carl-Jan Colpaert is an American film director, producer, screenwriter and chairman of Cineville.com, Inc.

== Early life ==
Carl-Jan Colpaert was born in Kortrijk, West Flanders, Belgium to father Roger Colpaert, who was a member of the executive committee at Bekaert and his mother, Marie-Therese Soens. He is the second of four children, Ann Colpaert, Chris Colpaert and Tom Colpaert. Carl Colpaert attended the Catholic University of Leuven and the National Radio and Film institute in Brussels. He moved to Los Angeles in 1983 to attend The American Film Institute

== Biography ==
Carl-Jan Colpaert was born in Belgium. He attended the American Film Institute, and started his professional career as a film editor for Roger Corman. He founded the production and distribution company Cineville in 1990 with Christoph Henkel. Since October 2023 Cineville has also been operating as a streaming platform specializing in programming a curated selection of indie content.

Colpaert made his directorial debut in 1991 with Delusion, which he co-wrote with Kurt Voss. Three years later he helmed The Crew in an directorial effort that Variety called "misguided". Drowning on Dry Land, a 1999 film that he wrote and directed, drew praise for Barbara Hershey and criticism for a screenplay that made the film "destined for half-inch". His 2004 film The Affair was similarly panned, with Variety calling it a "homevid-bound indie drama that recalls the most pretentious pseudo-artsy product of the 1960s and '70s".

Two years later his film G.I. Jesus, about a Marine returning from the Iraq War, won the Grand Jury Prize at CineVegas. It was reviewed by Matt Zoller Seitz in The New York Times as "so impressive in so many ways that it demands to be taken seriously".

Colpaert has a star on the walk of fame in Ostend

== Personal life ==
Colpaert resides in Malibu, California. He has two daughters, Jacqueline Dufwa-Colpaert (born in New York) and Celine Colpaert (born in Santa Monica), (Yves Dessca is godfather to Celine).

== Selected filmography ==
=== Producer ===
- Gas Food Lodging (1992) - Columbia Tristar
- Mi Vida Loca (1993) - Sony Classics
- Swimming with Sharks (1994) - Lionsgate
- Cafe Society (film) (1995) - Showtime
- The Whole Wide World (1996) - Sony Classics
- Nevada (film) (1997) - Columbia Tristar
- The Velocity of Gary (1997) - Columbia Tristar
- Hurlyburly (film) (1997) - New Line Cinema
- Where Eskimos Live (2000) - Cineville
- Mrs. Palfrey at the Claremont (2006) - Cineville/ BBC
- Disconnected (2016) - Warner Bros.
- Female Fight Club (2017) - Lionsgate
- Afterward (film) (2020) - Lionsgate
- Paul Is Dead (film) (2021) - Cineville
- Dime Detective (2024) - Cineville
- Yucatan (film) (2024) - Lionsgate

=== Director ===
- In the Aftermath (1988) – New World International
- Delusion (1991) – Columbia Tristar
- The Crew (1994) – Lionsgate
- Drowning on Dry Land (1999) -Unipix
- Façade (2000) – Sony
- The Affair (2004) – Cineville
- G.I. Jesús (2006) – Cineville
- Black Limousine (2012) – Anchor Bay Films
- Something About Her (2020) – Amazon Prime
- Yucatan (2024) - Cineville
