= The Affair (2004 film) =

- Theatrical release poster
- Directed by: Carl Colpaert
- Written by: Carl Colpaert; Lisa Larrivee
- Starring: Kelsey Oldershaw; Andy Mackenzie; Horacio Le Don
- Release date: 2004
- Country: United States
- Language: English

The Affair is a 2004 drama film directed by Carl Colpaert and starring Kelsey Oldershaw, Andy Mackenzie, and Horacio Le Don.

== Premise ==
Jean (Kelsey Oldershaw) is a bored housewife living in a designer house with her architect husband Paul (Horacio Le Don), a man of success who is so self-centered and controlling that he forgets his relationship obligations to his wife. Jean has residual scars from a traumatic childhood experience and her needs go beyond the wifely role, searching for some degree of excitement, passion and fulfillment not available in her marriage. At a local dance club she meets Viggo (Andy Mackenzie), a bohemian passionate, live for the moment guy who sweeps Jean off her feet in an affair that produces disaster in her marriage.

== Cast ==
- Kelsey Oldershaw
- Andy Mackenzie
- Horacio Le Don
- Ronnie Gene Blevins as Donny
- Charles Fathy

== Accolades ==
The film received four Gold Remi awards at the 2004 Worldfest.
