= Cineville =

Production and international distribution company

Cineville is an American streaming platform, production and international distribution company founded in 1990 by Carl Colpaert and Christoph Henkel. It is trademarked in the US, EU and throughout Latin America.

Cineville has produced over 55 feature films, which have participated in film festivals including the Sundance Film Festival and Cannes Film Festival.

== Selected filmography ==
- Delusion - Columbia Tristar
- Gas Food Lodging (1992) - Columbia Tristar
- Mi Vida Loca (1993) - Sony Classics
- The Crew (film) (1994) - Lionsgate
- Swimming with Sharks (1994) - Lionsgate
- Cafe Society (film) (1995) - Showtime
- The Whole Wide World (1996) - Sony Classics
- Nevada - Columbia Tristar
- The Velocity of Gary (1997) - Columbia Tristar
- Hurlyburly (film) (1997) - New Line Cinema
- Where Eskimos Live (2000) - Cineville
- Mrs. Palfrey at the Claremont (2006) - Cineville/ BBC
- G.I. Jesus (2006) - Cineville
- Black Limousine (film) (2010) - Starz
- Disconnected (2016 film) (2016) - Warner Bros.
- Female Fight Club (2017) - Lionsgate
- Afterward (film) (2020) - Lionsgate
- Paul Is Dead (film) (2021) - Universal UK
- Something About Her (film) (2021) - Amazon prime
- Don't Knock the Rock (2024)

== Awards ==
Cineville's second production, Gas Food Lodging, premiered at the Sundance Film Festival and was nominated for the Golden Bear at the Berlinale, winning the Independent Spirit Award for best actress.

Hurlyburly (film) premiered at the Venice Film Festival with Sean Penn winning best actor.

Mrs. Palfrey at the Claremont won the audience award at the Palm Springs Film Festival.
