= CineVegas =

Film festival held in Paradise, Nevada, US

CineVegas was a film festival held annually at the Palms Casino Resort in Paradise, Nevada, that ran from 1999 to 2009, typically in early June. CineVegas was originally held at Bally's. The first Festival featured “The Best of the Fests”, showcasing independent films that had previously earned awards and acclaim at other worldwide festivals. In 2000, the Festival moved to Bally's sister hotel Paris. Actor Dennis Hopper received the Marquee Award and became the chair of the CineVegas Film Festival Creative Advisory Board in 2004, continuing as chairman until his death in 2010.

CineVegas was profiled in The New York Times, Los Angeles Times, and Time. It was mentioned as one of the top 5 festivals to visit by Canada's The Globe and Mail newspaper, one of the top 5 gem festivals in the world by Variety, and one of the top 12 film festivals in North America by San Francisco Magazine. Due to economic concerns, the 2010 Festival was cancelled. The festival was not held again until six years later, when it resumed as part of the Las Vegas Film Festival.
