= John McKissick =

American football player and coach (1926–2019)

Biographical details
- Born: September 25, 1926; Greenwood, South Carolina, U.S.
- Died: November 28, 2019 (aged 93); Summerville, South Carolina, U.S.

Playing career
- 1948–1949: Brevard
- 1950–1951: Presbyterian
- Position: Fullback

Coaching career (HC unless noted)
- 1952–2014: Summerville HS (SC)

Head coaching record
- Overall: 621–155–13

Accomplishments and honors

Championships
- 10 South Carolina state (1955, 1956, 1969, 1978, 1979, 1982, 1983, 1984, 1986, 1998)

Awards
- 1980, 1994 and 2003 HS Coach of the Year

John McKissick (September 25, 1926 – November 28, 2019) was a head football coach of Summerville High School in Summerville, South Carolina. In 2012, he became the first American football coach in history (high school, college, or professional) to win 600 career games. His 600th win came against Summerville's Ashley Ridge High School. Up until 2013, he had never missed a game in 62 years and was the longest serving high school football coach of all time. He led Summerville to 10 state championships. With 621 wins, McKissick held the record for most wins by a football coach at any level until 2023, when John T. Curtis Jr. broke it. He graduated from Kingstree Senior High School in Kingstree, South Carolina, then went to Presbyterian College for two years before being drafted into the Army (as a paratrooper). He returned to Presbyterian to graduate with a degree in economics in 1951. He then worked for his father for a while before finally getting the coaching job at Summerville High. He coached all three of his grandsons, Richard and Joe Call, and Donny McElveen. He was elected to the National High School Hall of Fame in 1990. After McKissick's retirement ahead of the 2015 season, grandson Joe Call who had been his offensive coordinator was named head coach.

McKissick was mentioned in Pat Conroy's The Prince of Tides novel in 1986 and the film that was released five years later. In Conroy's novel, South of Broad, McKissick is given dialogue in a fictional game played between Summerville High School and Peninsula High School.
