= Writers Guild of America Award for Best Adapted Screenplay =

Annual screenwriting award

Writers Guild of America Award for Adapted Screenplay
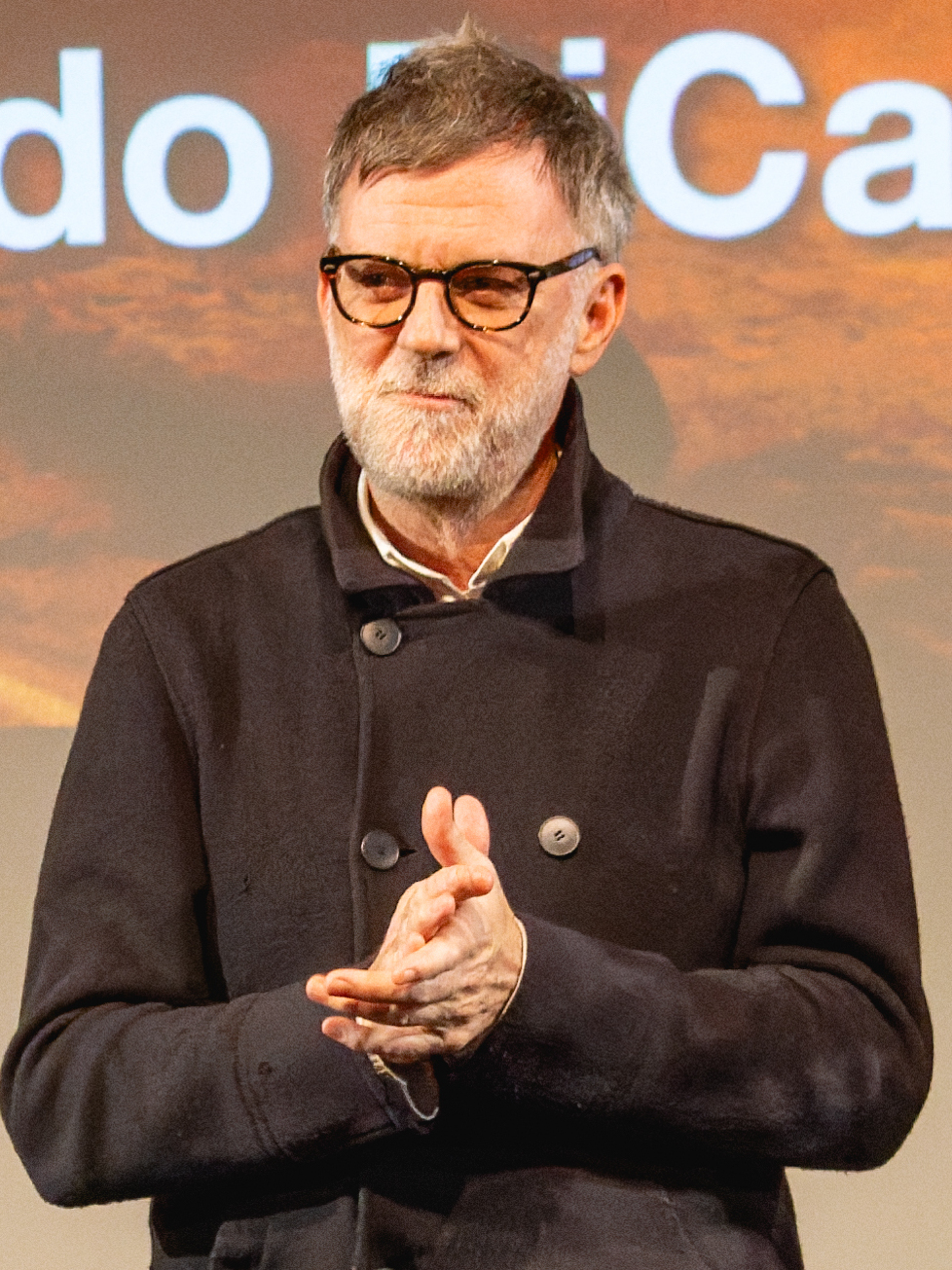
- The 2025 winner: Paul Thomas Anderson
- Awarded for: Outstanding Writing for a Film Adapted from Another Medium
- Country: United States
- Presented by: Writers Guild of America
- First award: 1970
- Currently held by: Paul Thomas Anderson, One Battle After Another (2025)
- Website: http://www.wga.org/

The Writers Guild of America Award for Best Adapted Screenplay is one of the three screenwriting Writers Guild of America Awards, focused specifically for film. The Writers Guild of America began making the distinction between an original screenplay and an adapted screenplay in 1970, when Waldo Salt, screenwriter for Midnight Cowboy, won for "Best Adapted Drama" and Arnold Schulman won "Best Adapted Comedy" for his screenplay of Goodbye, Columbus. Separate awards for dramas and comedies continued until 1984.

== Winners and nominees ==
- † indicates an Academy Award for Best Adapted Screenplay winner

=== 1960s ===
| Year | Film | Recipient(s) | Source material |
|---|---|---|---|
| 1969 (22nd) | Best Drama Adapted from Another Medium | | |
| 1969 (22nd) | Midnight Cowboy † | Waldo Salt | The novel by James Leo Herlihy |
| 1969 (22nd) | Anne of the Thousand Days | John Hale, and Bridget Boland | The play by Maxwell Anderson |
| 1969 (22nd) | The Prime of Miss Jean Brodie | Jay Presson Allen | The novel by Muriel Spark |
| 1969 (22nd) | They Shoot Horses, Don't They? | James Poe, and Robert E. Thompson | The novel by Horace McCoy |
| 1969 (22nd) | True Grit | Marguerite Roberts | The novel by Charles Portis |
| 1969 (22nd) | Best Comedy Adapted from Another Medium | | |
| 1969 (22nd) | Goodbye, Columbus | Arnold Schulman | The novella by Philip Roth |
| 1969 (22nd) | Cactus Flower | I.A.L. Diamond | The play by Abe Burrows |
| 1969 (22nd) | Gaily, Gaily | Abram S. Ginnes | The memoir by Ben Hecht |
| 1969 (22nd) | John and Marty | John Mortimer | The novel by Mervyn Jones |
| 1969 (22nd) | The Reivers | Irving Ravetch, and Harriet Frank Jr. | The novel The Reivers: A Reminiscence by William Faulkner |

=== 1970s ===
| Year | Film | Recipient(s) | Source material |
|---|---|---|---|
| 1970 (23rd) | Best Drama Adapted from Another Medium | | |
| 1970 (23rd) | I Never Sang for My Father | Robert Anderson | The play by Robert Anderson |
| 1970 (23rd) | Airport | George Seaton | The novel by Arthur Hailey |
| 1970 (23rd) | Catch-22 | Buck Henry | The novel by Joseph Heller |
| 1970 (23rd) | The Great White Hope | Howard Sackler | The play by Howard Sackler |
| 1970 (23rd) | Little Big Man | Calder Willingham | The novel by Thomas Berger |
| 1970 (23rd) | Best Comedy Adapted from Another Medium | | |
| 1970 (23rd) | M*A*S*H † | Ring Lardner Jr. | The novel MASH: A Novel About Three Army Doctors by Richard Hooker |
| 1970 (23rd) | Lovers and Other Strangers | Renée Taylor, Joseph Bologna, David Zelag Goodman | The play by Renée Taylor and Joseph Bologna |
| 1970 (23rd) | The Owl and the Pussycat | Buck Henry | The play by Bill Manhoff |
| 1970 (23rd) | The Twelve Chairs | Mel Brooks | The novel by Ilf and Petrov |
| 1970 (23rd) | Where's Poppa | Robert Klane | The novel by Robert Klane |
| 1971 (24th) | Best Drama Adapted from Another Medium | | |
| 1971 (24th) | The French Connection † | Ernest Tidyman | The book by Robin Moore |
| 1971 (24th) | A Clockwork Orange | Stanley Kubrick | The novel by Anthony Burgess |
| 1971 (24th) | Johnny Got His Gun | Dalton Trumbo | The novel by Dalton Trumbo |
| 1971 (24th) | The Last Picture Show | Larry McMurtry, and Peter Bodganovich | The novel by Larry McMurtry |
| 1971 (24th) | McCabe & Mrs. Miller | Robert Altman, and Brian McKay | The novel McCabe by Edmund Naughton |
| 1971 (24th) | Best Comedy Adapted from Another Medium | | |
| 1971 (24th) | Kotch | John Paxton | The novel by Katharine Topkins |
| 1971 (24th) | The Boy Friend | Ken Russell | The musical by Sandy Wilson |
| 1971 (24th) | Fiddler on the Roof | Joseph Stein | The musical by Jerry Bock, Sheldon Harnick and Joseph Stein and the novel by Sholem Aleichem |
| 1971 (24th) | Little Murders | Jules Feiffer | The play by Jules Feiffer |
| 1971 (24th) | A New Leaf | Elaine May | The short story "The Green Heart" by Jack Ritchie |
| 1972 (25th) | Best Drama Adapted from Another Medium | | |
| 1972 (25th) | The Godfather † | Mario Puzo, and Francis Ford Coppola | The novel by Mario Puzo |
| 1972 (25th) | Deliverance | James Dickey | The novel by James Dickey |
| 1972 (25th) | Pete 'n' Tillie | Julius J. Epstein | The novella Witch's Milk by Peter De Vries |
| 1972 (25th) | Slaughterhouse-Five | Stephen Geller | The novel by Kurt Vonnegut |
| 1972 (25th) | Sounder | Lonne Elder III | The novel by William H. Armstrong |
| 1972 (25th) | Best Comedy Adapted from Another Medium | | |
| 1972 (25th) | Cabaret | Jay Presson Allen | The musical by John Van Druten and the book by Joe Masteroff |
| 1972 (25th) | Avanti! | Billy Wilder, and I.A.L. Diamond | The play by Samuel A. Taylor |
| 1972 (25th) | Butterflies Are Free | Leonard Gershe | The play by Leonard Gershe |
| 1972 (25th) | The Heartbreak Kid | Neil Simon | The short story "A Change of Plan" by Bruce Jay Friedman |
| 1972 (25th) | Travels with My Aunt | Jay Presson Allen, and Hugh Wheeler | The novel by Graham Greene |
| 1973 (26th) | Best Drama Adapted from Another Medium | | |
| 1973 (26th) | Serpico | Waldo Salt, and Norman Wexler | The book by Peter Maas |
| 1973 (26th) | Cinderella Liberty | Darryl Ponicsan | The novel by Darryl Ponicsan |
| 1973 (26th) | The Exorcist † | William Peter Blatty | The novel by William Peter Blatty |
| 1973 (26th) | The Last Detail | Robert Towne | The novel by Darryl Ponicsan |
| 1973 (26th) | The Paper Chase | James Bridges | The novel by John Jay Osborn Jr. |
| 1973 (26th) | Best Comedy Adapted from Another Medium | | |
| 1973 (26th) | Paper Moon | Alvin Sargent | The novel Addie Pray by Joe David Brown |
| 1973 (26th) | 40 Carats | Leonard Gershe | The play by Jay Presson Allen based on the play Quarante carats by Pierre Barillet and Jean-Pierre Gredy |
| 1973 (26th) | Godspell | David Greenne, and John-Michael Tebelak | The musical by Stephen Schwartz and John-Michael Tebelak |
| 1974 (27th) | Best Drama Adapted from Another Medium | | |
| 1974 (27th) | The Godfather Part II † | Francis Ford Coppola, and Mario Puzo | The novel The Godfather by Mario Puzo |
| 1974 (27th) | Conrack | Irving Ravetch, and Harriet Frank Jr. | The memoir The Water Is Wide by Pat Conroy |
| 1974 (27th) | Lenny | Julian Barry | The play by Julian Barry |
| 1974 (27th) | The Parallax View | David Giler and Lorenzo Sempler Jr. | The novel by Loren Singer |
| 1974 (27th) | The Talking of Pelham One Two Three | Peter Stone | The novel by John Godey |
| 1974 (27th) | Best Comedy Adapted from Another Medium | | |
| 1974 (27th) | The Apprenticeship of Duddy Kravitz | Mordecai Richler, and Lionel Chetwynd | The novel by Mordecai Richler |
| 1974 (27th) | The Front Page | Billy Wilder, and I.A.L. Diamond | The comedy by Ben Hecht and Charles MacArthur |
| 1974 (27th) | Young Frankenstein | Gene Wilder, and Mel Brooks | The characters on the novel Frankenstein by Mary Shelley |
| 1975 (28th) | Best Drama Adapted from Another Medium | | |
| 1975 (28th) | One Flew Over the Cuckoo's Nest † | Lawrence Hauben, and Bo Goldman | The novel by Ken Kesey |
| 1975 (28th) | Barry Lyndon | Stanley Kubrick | The novel The Luck of Barry Lyndon by William Makepeace Thackeray |
| 1975 (28th) | Jaws | Peter Benchley, and Carl Gottlieb | The novel by Peter Benchley |
| 1975 (28th) | The Man in the Glass Booth | Edward Anhalt | The novel and play by Robert Shaw |
| 1975 (28th) | The Man Who Would Be King | John Huston, and Gladys Hill | The novella by Rudyard Kipling |
| 1975 (28th) | Best Comedy Adapted from Another Medium | | |
| 1975 (28th) | The Sunshine Boys | Neil Simon | The play by Neil Simon |
| 1975 (28th) | Hester Street | Joan Micklin Silver | The novella Yekl: A Tale of the New York Ghetto by Abraham Cahan |
| 1975 (28th) | The Prisoner of Second Avenue | Neil Simon | The play by Neil Simon |
| 1976 (29th) | Best Drama Adapted from Another Medium | | |
| 1976 (29th) | All the President's Men † | William Goldman | The book by Carl Bernstein and Bob Woodward |
| 1976 (29th) | Bound for Glory | Robert Getchell | The book by Woody Guthrie |
| 1976 (29th) | Marathon Man | William Goldman | The novel by William Goldman |
| 1976 (29th) | The Seven-Per-Cent Solution | Nicholas Meyer | The novel by Nicholas Meyer |
| 1976 (29th) | The Shootist | Miles Hood Swarthout, and Scott Hale | The novel by Glendon Swarthout |
| 1976 (29th) | Best Comedy Adapted from Another Medium | | |
| 1976 (29th) | The Pink Panther Strikes Again | Frank Waldman, and Blake Edwards | The film series The Pink Panther |
| 1976 (29th) | The Bingo Long Traveling All-Stars & Motor Kings | Hal Barwood, and Matthew Robbins | The novel by William Brashler |
| 1976 (29th) | Family Plot | Ernest Lehman | The novel The Rainbird Pattern by Victor Canning |
| 1976 (29th) | The Ritz | Terrence McNally | The play by Terrence McNally |
| 1976 (29th) | Stay Hungry | Charles Gaines, and Bob Rafelson | The novel by Charles Gaines |
| 1977 (30th) | Best Drama Adapted from Another Medium | | |
| 1977 (30th) | Julia † | Alvin Sargent | A chapter from the book Pentimento by Lillian Hellman |
| 1977 (30th) | I Never Promised You a Rose Garden | Gavin Lambert, and Lewis John Carlino | The novel by Joanne Greenberg |
| 1977 (30th) | Islands in the Stream | Denne Bart Petitclerc | The novel by Ernest Hemingway |
| 1977 (30th) | Looking for Mr. Goodbar | Richard Brooks | The novel by Judith Rossner |
| 1977 (30th) | Best Comedy Adapted from Another Medium | | |
| 1977 (30th) | Oh, God! | Larry Gelbart | The novel by Avery Corman |
| 1977 (30th) | Semi-Tough | Walter Bernstein | The novel by Dan Jenkins |
| 1977 (30th) | The Spy Who Loved Me | Christopher Wood, and Richard Maibaum | The characters by Ian Fleming |
| 1978 (31st) | Best Drama Adapted from Another Medium | | |
| 1978 (31st) | Midnight Express † | Oliver Stone | The book by Billy Hayes |
| 1978 (31st) | Bloodbrothers | Walter Newman | The novel by Richard Price |
| 1978 (31st) | Go Tell the Spartans | Wendell Mayes | The novel Incident at Muc Wa by Daniel Ford |
| 1978 (31st) | Invasion of the Body Snatchers | W.D. Richter | The novel The Body Snatchers by Jack Finney |
| 1978 (31st) | Who'll Stop the Rain | Judith Rascoe, and Robert Stone | The novel Dog Soldiers by Robert Stone |
| 1978 (31st) | Best Comedy Adapted from Another Medium | | |
| 1978 (31st) | Heaven Can Wait | Elaine May, and Warren Beatty | The play by Harry Segall |
| 1978 (31st) | California Suite | Neil Simon | The play by Neil Simon |
| 1978 (31st) | Same Time, Next Year | Bernard Slade | The play by Bernard Slade |
| 1978 (31st) | Superman | Mario Puzo, David Newman, Leslie Newman, and Robert Benton | The character Superman by Jerry Siegel and Joe Shuster |
| 1978 (31st) | Who Is Killing the Great Chefs of Europe? | Peter Stone | The novel by Nan Lyons and Ivan Lyons |
| 1979 (32nd) | Best Drama Adapted from Another Medium | | |
| 1979 (32nd) | Kramer vs. Kramer † | Robert Benton | The novel by Avery Corman |
| 1979 (32nd) | Norma Rae | Irving Ravetch, and Harriet Frank Jr. | The book Crystal Lee, a Woman of Inheritance by Henry P. Leifermann |
| 1979 (32nd) | Best Comedy Adapted from Another Medium | | |
| 1979 (32nd) | Being There | Jerzy Kosinski | The novel by Jerzy Kosinski |
| 1979 (32nd) | A Little Romance | Allan Burns | The novel E=mc2 Mon Amour by Patrick Cauvin |
| 1979 (32nd) | Starting Over | James L. Brooks | The novel by Dan Wakefield |

=== 1980s ===
| Year | Film | Recipient(s) | Source material |
|---|---|---|---|
| 1980 (33rd) | Best Drama Adapted from Other Medium | | |
| 1980 (33rd) | Ordinary People † | Alvin Sargent | The novel by Judith Guest |
| 1980 (33rd) | Coal Miner's Daughter | Thomas Rickman | The autobiography by Loretta Lynn and George Vecsey |
| 1980 (33rd) | The Elephant Man | Christopher De Vore, Eric Bergren, and David Lynch | The books The Elephant Man and Other Reminiscences by Frederick Treves and The Elephant Man: A Study in Human Dignity by Ashley Montagu |
| 1980 (33rd) | The Great Santini | Lewis John Carlino | The novel by Pat Conroy |
| 1980 (33rd) | The Stunt Man | Lawrence B. Marcus, Richard Rush | The novel by Paul Brodeur |
| 1980 (33rd) | Best Comedy Adapted from Other Another Medium | | |
| 1980 (33rd) | Airplane! | Jim Abrahams, David Zucker, and Jerry Zucker | The film Zero Hour! by Arthur Hailey, Hall Bartlett and John Champion and the Airport film series based on the novel by Hailey |
| 1980 (33rd) | Hopscotch | Brian Garfield, and Bryan Forbes | The novel by Brian Garfield |
| 1980 (33rd) | Star Wars: Episode V - The Empire Strikes Back | Leigh Brackett, and Lawrence Kasdan | The story by George Lucas |
| 1981 (34th) | Best Drama Adapted from Other Medium | | |
| 1981 (34th) | On Golden Pond † | Ernest Thompson, and Donald E. Stewart | The play by Ernest Thompson |
| 1981 (34th) | Cutter's Way | Jeffrey Alan Fiskin | The novel Cutter and Bone by Newton Thornburg |
| 1981 (34th) | Prince of the City | Jay Presson Allen, and Sidney Lumet | The book by Robert Daley |
| 1981 (34th) | Ragtime | Michael Weller | The novel by E. L. Doctorow |
| 1981 (34th) | Best Comedy Adapted from Other Another Medium | | |
| 1981 (34th) | Rich and Famous | Gerald Ayres | The play Old Acquaintance by John Van Druten |
| 1981 (34th) | For Your Eyes Only | Richard Maibaum, and Michael G. Wilson | The short stories "For Your Eyes Only" and "Risico" by Ian Fleming |
| 1981 (34th) | First Monday in October | Jerome Lawrence, and Robert E. Lee | The play by Jerome Lawrence and Robert E. Lee |
| 1982 (35th) | Best Drama Adapted from Other Medium | | |
| 1982 (35th) | Missing † | Costa-Gavras, and Donald E. Stewart | The book The Execution of Charles Horman: An American Sacrifice by Thomas Hauser |
| 1982 (35th) | Sophie's Choice | Alan J. Pakula | The novel by William Styron |
| 1982 (35th) | The Verdict | David Mamet | The novel by Barry Reed |
| 1982 (35th) | The World According to Garp | Steve Tesich | The novel by John Irving |
| 1982 (35th) | Best Comedy Adapted from Other Another Medium | | |
| 1982 (35th) | Victor Victoria | Blake Edwards | The film Viktor und Viktoria, concept by Hans Hoemburg and script by Reinhold Schünzel |
| 1982 (35th) | Fast Times at Ridgemont High | Cameron Crowe | The book Fast Times at Ridgemont High: A True Story by Cameron Crowe |
| 1983 (36th) | Best Drama Adapted from Other Medium | | |
| 1983 (36th) | Reuben, Reuben | Julius J. Epstein | The play Spofford by Herman Shumlin |
| 1983 (36th) | The Year of Living Dangerously | David Williamson, Peter Weir and C.J. Koch | The novel by Christopher Koch |
| 1983 (36th) | The Right Stuff | Philip Kaufman | The book by Tom Wolfe |
| 1983 (36th) | Best Comedy Adapted from Other Another Medium | | |
| 1983 (36th) | Terms of Endearment † | James L. Brooks | The novel by Larry McMurtry |
| 1983 (36th) | A Christmas Story | Jean Shepherd, Leigh Brown, and Bob Clark | The novel In God We Trust: All Others Pay Cash by Jean Shepherd |
| 1983 (36th) | To Be or Not to Be | Thomas Meehan, and Ronny Graham | The 1942 screenplay by Edwin Justus Mayer and the story of Melchior Lengyel and Ernst Lubitsch |
| 1984 (37th) | The Killing Fields | Bruce Robinson | The biography The Death and Life of Dith Pran by Sydney Schanberg |
| 1984 (37th) | Greystoke: The Legend of Tarzan, Lord of the Apes | Robert Towne and Michael Austin | The novel Tarzan of the Apes by Edgar Rice Burroughs |
| 1984 (37th) | The Natural | Roger Towne and Phil Dusenberry | The novel by Bernard Malamud |
| 1984 (37th) | A Passage to India | David Lean | The novel by E. M. Forster |
| 1984 (37th) | A Soldier's Story | Charles Fuller | The play A Soldier's Play by Charles Fuller |
| 1985 (38th) | Prizzi's Honor | Richard Condon and Janet Roach | The novel by Richard Condon |
| 1985 (38th) | Agnes of God | John Pielmeier | The play by John Pielmeier |
| 1985 (38th) | The Color Purple | Menno Meyjes | The novel by Alice Walker |
| 1985 (38th) | Out of Africa † | Kurt Luedtke | The books Isak Dinesen: The Life of a Story Teller by Judith Thurman and Silence Will Speak by Errol Trzebinski |
| 1985 (38th) | The Trip to Bountiful | Horton Foote | The play by Horton Foote |
| 1986 (39th) | A Room with a View † | Ruth Prawer Jhabvala | The novel by E. M. Forster |
| 1986 (39th) | Children of a Lesser God | Hesper Anderson and Mark Medoff | The play by Mark Medoff |
| 1986 (39th) | Down and Out in Beverly Hills | Paul Mazursky and Leon Capetanos | The film Boudu Saved from Drowning by Jean Renoir based on the play by René Fauchois |
| 1986 (39th) | Little Shop of Horrors | Howard Ashman | The musical by Howard Ashman and the 1960 screenplay by Charles B. Griffith |
| 1986 (39th) | Stand by Me | Bruce A. Evans and Raynold Gideon | The novella The Body by Stephen King |
| 1987 (40th) | Roxanne | Steve Martin | The play Cyrano de Bergerac by Edmond Rostand |
| 1987 (40th) | Fatal Attraction | James Dearden | The short film Diversion by James Dearden |
| 1987 (40th) | Full Metal Jacket | Stanley Kubrick, Michael Herr, and Gustav Hasford | The novel The Short-Timers by Gustav Hasford |
| 1987 (40th) | The Princess Bride | William Goldman | The novel by William Goldman |
| 1987 (40th) | The Untouchables | David Mamet | The book by Eliot Ness and Oscar Fraley |
| 1988 (41st) | Dangerous Liaisons † | Christopher Hampton | The play by Christopher Hampton based on the novel by Pierre Choderlos de Laclos |
| 1988 (41st) | The Accidental Tourist | Frank Galati and Lawrence Kasdan | The novel by Anne Tyler |
| 1988 (41st) | Gorillas in the Mist: The Story of Dian Fossey | Anna Hamilton Phelan and Tab Murphy | The work by Dian Fossey and the article of Harold T.P. Hayes |
| 1988 (41st) | The Unbearable Lightness of Being | Jean-Claude Carrière and Philip Kaufman | The novel by Milan Kundera |
| 1988 (41st) | Who Framed Roger Rabbit | Jeffrey Price and Peter S. Seaman | The novel Who Censored Roger Rabbit? by Gary K. Wolf |
| 1989 (42nd) | Driving Miss Daisy † | Alfred Uhry | The play by Alfred Uhry |
| 1989 (42nd) | Born on the Fourth of July | Oliver Stone and Ron Kovic | The autobiography by Ron Kovic |
| 1989 (42nd) | Field of Dreams | Phil Alden Robinson | The novel Shoeless Joe by W. P. Kinsella |
| 1989 (42nd) | Glory | Kevin Jarre | The books Lay This Laurel 1973 by Lincoln Kirstein and One Gallant Rush by Peter Burchard |
| 1989 (42nd) | My Left Foot | Jim Sheridan and Shane Connaughton | The autobiography by Christy Brown |

=== 1990s ===
| Year | Film | Recipient(s) | Source material |
|---|---|---|---|
| 1990 (43rd) | Dances with Wolves † | Michael Blake | The book by Michael Blake |
| 1990 (43rd) | Awakenings | Steven Zaillian | The memoir by Oliver Sacks |
| 1990 (43rd) | Goodfellas | Martin Scorsese and Nicholas Pileggi | The book Wiseguy by Nicholas Pileggi |
| 1990 (43rd) | The Grifters | Donald E. Westlake | The book by Jim Thompson |
| 1990 (43rd) | Reversal of Fortune | Nicholas Kazan | The book Reversal of Fortune: Inside the von Bülow Case by Alan Dershowitz |
| 1991 (44th) | The Silence of the Lambs † | Ted Tally | The novel by Thomas Harris |
| 1991 (44th) | The Commitments | Dick Clement, Ian La Frenais and Roddy Doyle | The novel by Roddy Doyle |
| 1991 (44th) | Fried Green Tomatoes | Fannie Flagg and Carol Sobieski | The novel Fried Green Tomatoes at the Whistle Stop Cafe by Fannie Flagg |
| 1991 (44th) | JFK | Oliver Stone and Zachary Sklar | The books On the Trail of the Assassins by Jim Garrison and Crossfire: The Plot That Killed Kennedy by Jim Marrs |
| 1991 (44th) | The Prince of Tides | Pat Conroy and Becky Johnston | The novel by Pat Conroy |
| 1992 (45th) | The Player | Michael Tolkin | The novel by Michael Tolkin |
| 1992 (45th) | Enchanted April | Peter Barnes | The novel The Enchanted April by Elizabeth von Arnim |
| 1992 (45th) | Glengarry Glen Ross | David Mamet | The play by David Mamet |
| 1992 (45th) | Howards End † | Ruth Prawer Jhabvala | The novel by E. M. Forster |
| 1992 (45th) | Scent of a Woman | Bo Goldman | The novel Il buio e il miele by Giovanni Arpino |
| 1993 (46th) | Schindler's List † | Steven Zaillian | The novel Schindler's Ark by Thomas Keneally |
| 1993 (46th) | The Fugitive | Jeb Stuart and David Twohy | The television series created by Roy Huggins |
| 1993 (46th) | In the Name of the Father | Terry George and Jim Sheridan | The autobiography Proved Innocent: The Story of Gerry Conlon of the Guildford Four by Gerry Conlon |
| 1993 (46th) | The Joy Luck Club | Amy Tan and Ronald Bass | The novel by Amy Tan |
| 1993 (46th) | The Remains of the Day | Ruth Prawer Jhabvala | The novel by Kazuo Ishiguro |
| 1994 (47th) | Forrest Gump † | Eric Roth | The novel by Winston Groom |
| 1994 (47th) | Little Women | Robin Swicord | The novel by Louisa May Alcott |
| 1994 (47th) | The Madness of King George | Alan Bennett | The play The Madness of George III by Alan Bennett |
| 1994 (47th) | Quiz Show | Paul Attanasio | The memoir Remembering America: A Voice From the Sixties by Richard N. Goodwin |
| 1994 (47th) | The Shawshank Redemption | Frank Darabont | The novella Rita Hayworth and Shawshank Redemption by Stephen King |
| 1995 (48th) | Sense and Sensibility † | Emma Thompson | The novel by Jane Austen |
| 1995 (48th) | Apollo 13 | William Broyles Jr. and Al Reinert | The book Lost Moon by Jim Lovell and Jeffrey Kluger |
| 1995 (48th) | Babe | George Miller and Chris Noonan | The novel The Sheep-Pig by Dick King-Smith |
| 1995 (48th) | Get Shorty | Scott Frank | The novel by Elmore Leonard |
| 1995 (48th) | Leaving Las Vegas | Mike Figgis | The novel by John O'Brien |
| 1996 (49th) | Sling Blade † | Billy Bob Thornton | The short film Some Folks Call It a Sling Blade by Billy Bob Thornton |
| 1996 (49th) | The Birdcage | Elaine May | The play La Cage aux Folles by Jean Poiret |
| 1996 (49th) | Emma | Douglas McGrath | The novel by Jane Austen |
| 1996 (49th) | The English Patient | Anthony Minghella | The novel by Michael Ondaatje |
| 1996 (49th) | Trainspotting | John Hodge | The novel by Irvine Welsh |
| 1997 (50th) | L.A. Confidential † | Curtis Hanson and Brian Helgeland | The novel by James Ellroy |
| 1997 (50th) | Donnie Brasco | Paul Attanasio | The book Donnie Brasco: My Undercover Life in the Mafia by Joseph D. Pistone |
| 1997 (50th) | The Ice Storm | James Schamus | The novel by Rick Moody |
| 1997 (50th) | Wag the Dog | Hilary Henkin and David Mamet | The novel American Hero by Larry Beinhart |
| 1997 (50th) | The Wings of the Dove | Hossein Amini | The novel by Henry James |
| 1998 (51st) | Out of Sight | Scott Frank | The novel by Elmore Leonard |
| 1998 (51st) | A Civil Action | Steven Zaillian | The book by Jonathan Harr |
| 1998 (51st) | Gods and Monsters † | Bill Condon | The novel Father of Frankenstein by Christopher Bram |
| 1998 (51st) | Primary Colors | Elaine May | The novel by Joe Klein |
| 1998 (51st) | A Simple Plan | Scott B. Smith | The novel by Scott B. Smith |
| 1999 (52nd) | Election | Alexander Payne and Jim Taylor | The novel by Tom Perrotta |
| 1999 (52nd) | The Cider House Rules † | John Irving | The novel by John Irving |
| 1999 (52nd) | The Insider | Eric Roth and Michael Mann | The article "The Man Who Knew Too Much" by Marie Brenner |
| 1999 (52nd) | October Sky | Lewis Colick | The book Rocket Boys by Homer Hickam |
| 1999 (52nd) | The Talented Mr. Ripley | Anthony Minghella | The novel by Patricia Highsmith |

=== 2000s ===
| Year | Film | Recipient(s) | Source material |
|---|---|---|---|
| 2000 (53rd) | Traffic † | Stephen Gaghan | The television serial Traffik by Simon Moore |
| 2000 (53rd) | Chocolat | Robert Nelson Jacobs | The novel by Joanne Harris |
| 2000 (53rd) | Crouching Tiger, Hidden Dragon | Hui-Ling Wang, James Schamus, and Tsai Kuo Jung | The novel by Wang Dulu |
| 2000 (53rd) | High Fidelity | D. V. DeVincentis, Steve Pink, John Cusack, and Scott Rosenberg | The novel by Nick Hornby |
| 2000 (53rd) | Wonder Boys | Steve Kloves | The novel by Michael Chabon |
| 2001 (54th) | A Beautiful Mind † | Akiva Goldsman | The book by Sylvia Nasar |
| 2001 (54th) | Black Hawk Down | Ken Nolan | The book by Mark Bowden |
| 2001 (54th) | Bridget Jones's Diary | Andrew Davies and Richard Curtis | The novel by Helen Fielding |
| 2001 (54th) | Ghost World | Daniel Clowes and Terry Zwigoff | The graphic noval by Daniel Clowes |
| 2001 (54th) | The Lord of the Rings: The Fellowship of the Ring | Fran Walsh, Philippa Boyens, and Peter Jackson | The novel The Fellowship of the Ring by J. R. R. Tolkien |
| 2002 (55th) | The Hours | David Hare | The novel by Michael Cunningham |
| 2002 (55th) | About a Boy | Peter Hedges, Chris Weitz, and Paul Weitz | The novel by Nick Hornby |
| 2002 (55th) | About Schmidt | Alexander Payne and Jim Taylor | The novel by Louis Begley |
| 2002 (55th) | Adaptation. | Charlie Kaufman and Donald Kaufman | The book The Orchid Thief by Susan Orlean |
| 2002 (55th) | Chicago | Bill Condon | The musical by Fred Ebb and Bob Fosse |
| 2003 (56th) | American Splendor | Shari Springer Berman and Robert Pulcini | The comics American Splendor by Harvey Pekar and Our Cancer Year by Pekar and Joyce Brabner |
| 2003 (56th) | Cold Mountain | Anthony Minghella | The novel by Charles Frazier |
| 2003 (56th) | The Lord of the Rings: The Return of the King † | Fran Walsh, Philippa Boyens, and Peter Jackson | The book The Return of the King by J. R. R. Tolkien |
| 2003 (56th) | Mystic River | Brian Helgeland | The novel by Dennis Lehane |
| 2003 (56th) | Seabiscuit | Gary Ross | The book Seabiscuit: An American Legend by Laura Hillenbrand |
| 2004 (57th) | Sideways † | Alexander Payne and Jim Taylor | The novel by Rex Pickett |
| 2004 (57th) | Before Sunset | Richard Linklater, Julie Delpy, Ethan Hawke, and Kim Krizan | Characters from the film Before Sunrise by Kim Krizan and Richard Linklater |
| 2004 (57th) | Mean Girls | Tina Fey | The book Queen Bees and Wannabes by Rosalind Wiseman |
| 2004 (57th) | Million Dollar Baby | Paul Haggis | The book Rope Burns: Stories from the Corner by F.X. Toole |
| 2004 (57th) | The Motorcycle Diaries (Diarios de motocicleta) | José Rivera | The books Con el Che por America Latina by Alberto Granado and The Motorcycle Diaries by Che Guevara |
| 2005 (58th) | Brokeback Mountain † | Larry McMurtry and Diana Ossana | The short story by Annie Proulx |
| 2005 (58th) | Capote | Dan Futterman | Capote by Gerald Clarke |
| 2005 (58th) | The Constant Gardener | Jeffrey Caine | The novel by John le Carré |
| 2005 (58th) | A History of Violence | Josh Olson | The graphic novel by John Wagner and Vince Locke |
| 2005 (58th) | Syriana | Stephen Gaghan | The memoir See No Evil by Robert Baer |
| 2006 (59th) | The Departed † | William Monahan | The film Infernal Affairs written by Alan Mak and Felix Chong |
| 2006 (59th) | Borat: Cultural Learnings of America for Make Benefit Glorious Nation of Kazakhstan | Sacha Baron Cohen, Peter Baynham, Anthony Hines, Todd Phillips, and Dan Mazer | The character Borat Sagdiyev, from the television series Da Ali G Show by Sacha Baron Cohen |
| 2006 (59th) | The Devil Wears Prada | Aline Brosh McKenna | The novel by Lauren Weisberger |
| 2006 (59th) | Little Children | Todd Field and Tom Perrotta | The novel by Tom Perrotta |
| 2006 (59th) | Thank You for Smoking | Jason Reitman | The novel by Christopher Buckley |
| 2007 (60th) | No Country for Old Men † | Joel Coen and Ethan Coen | The novel by Cormac McCarthy |
| 2007 (60th) | The Diving Bell and the Butterfly | Ronald Harwood | The memoir by Jean-Dominique Bauby |
| 2007 (60th) | Into the Wild | Sean Penn | The book by Jon Krakauer |
| 2007 (60th) | There Will Be Blood | Paul Thomas Anderson | The novel Oil! by Upton Sinclair |
| 2007 (60th) | Zodiac | James Vanderbilt | The book by Robert Graysmith |
| 2008 (61st) | Slumdog Millionaire † | Simon Beaufoy | The novel Q & A by Vikas Swarup |
| 2008 (61st) | The Curious Case of Benjamin Button | Eric Roth and Robin Swicord | The short story by F. Scott Fitzgerald |
| 2008 (61st) | The Dark Knight | Jonathan Nolan, Christopher Nolan, and David S. Goyer | The characters from the DC Comics created by Bob Kane and Bill Finger |
| 2008 (61st) | Doubt | John Patrick Shanley | The play Doubt: A Parable by John Patrick Shanley |
| 2008 (61st) | Frost/Nixon | Peter Morgan | The play by Peter Morgan |
| 2009 (62nd) | Up in the Air | Jason Reitman and Sheldon Turner | The novel by Walter Kirn |
| 2009 (62nd) | Crazy Heart | Scott Cooper | The novel by Thomas Cobb |
| 2009 (62nd) | Julie & Julia | Nora Ephron | The books My Life in France by Julia Child and Alex Prud'homme and Julie & Julia: 365 Days, 524 Recipes, 1 Tiny Apartment Kitchen by Julie Powell |
| 2009 (62nd) | Precious † | Geoffrey S. Fletcher | The novel Push by Sapphire |
| 2009 (62nd) | Star Trek | Roberto Orci and Alex Kurtzman | The characters created by Gene Roddenberry |

=== 2010s ===
| Year | Film | Recipient(s) | Source material |
|---|---|---|---|
| 2010 (63rd) | The Social Network † | Aaron Sorkin | The book The Accidental Billionaires by Ben Mezrich |
| 2010 (63rd) | 127 Hours | Danny Boyle and Simon Beaufoy | The book Between a Rock and a Hard Place by Aron Ralston |
| 2010 (63rd) | I Love You Phillip Morris | Glenn Ficarra and John Requa | The book I Love You Phillip Morris: A True Story of Life, Love, and Prison Breaks by Steven McVicker |
| 2010 (63rd) | The Town | Ben Affleck, Peter Craig, and Aaron Stockard | The novel Prince of Thieves by Chuck Hogan |
| 2010 (63rd) | True Grit | Joel Coen and Ethan Coen | The novel by Charles Portis |
| 2011 (64th) | The Descendants † | Alexander Payne, Nat Faxon, and Jim Rash | The novel by Kaui Hart Hemmings |
| 2011 (64th) | The Girl with the Dragon Tattoo | Steven Zaillian | The novel by Stieg Larsson |
| 2011 (64th) | The Help | Tate Taylor | The novel by Kathryn Stockett |
| 2011 (64th) | Hugo | John Logan | The book The Invention of Hugo Cabret by Brian Selznick |
| 2011 (64th) | Moneyball | Aaron Sorkin and Steven Zaillian | The book by Michael Lewis |
| 2012 (65th) | Argo † | Chris Terrio | A selection from the book The Master of Disguise by Tony Mendez and the Wired magazine article "The Great Escape: How the CIA Used a Fake Sci-Fi Flick to Rescue Americans from Tehran" by Joshuah Bearman |
| 2012 (65th) | Life of Pi | David Magee | The novel by Yann Martel |
| 2012 (65th) | Lincoln | Tony Kushner | In part, the book Team of Rivals by Doris Kearns Goodwin |
| 2012 (65th) | The Perks of Being a Wallflower | Stephen Chbosky | The novel by Chbosky |
| 2012 (65th) | Silver Linings Playbook | David O. Russell | The novel by Matthew Quick |
2013 (66th)
| 2013 (66th) | Captain Phillips | Billy Ray | The book A Captain's Duty: Somali Pirates, Navy SEALS, and Dangerous Days at Sea by Richard Phillips with Stephan Talty |
| 2013 (66th) | August: Osage County | Tracy Letts | The play by Letts |
| 2013 (66th) | Before Midnight | Richard Linklater, Ethan Hawke, and Julie Delpy | The characters created by Richard Linklater and Kim Krizan |
| 2013 (66th) | Lone Survivor | Peter Berg | The book by Marcus Lutrell and Patrick Robinson |
| 2013 (66th) | The Wolf of Wall Street | Terence Winter | The memoir by Jordan Belfort |
2014 (67th)
| 2014 (67th) | The Imitation Game † | Graham Moore | The book Alan Turing: The Enigma by Andrew Hodges |
| 2014 (67th) | American Sniper | Jason Hall | The book by Chris Kyle with Jim DeFelice and Scott McEwan |
| 2014 (67th) | Gone Girl | Gillian Flynn | The novel by Flynn |
| 2014 (67th) | Guardians of the Galaxy | James Gunn and Nicole Perlman | The Marvel comic by Dan Abnett and Andy Lanning |
| 2014 (67th) | Wild | Nick Hornby | The memoir Wild: From Lost to Found on the Pacific Crest Trail by Cheryl Strayed |
2015 (68th)
| 2015 (68th) | The Big Short † | Adam McKay and Charles Randolph | The book by Michael Lewis |
| 2015 (68th) | Carol | Phyllis Nagy | The novel The Price of Salt by Patricia Highsmith |
| 2015 (68th) | The Martian | Drew Goddard | The novel by Andy Weir |
| 2015 (68th) | Steve Jobs | Aaron Sorkin | The book by Walter Isaacson |
| 2015 (68th) | Trumbo | John McNamara | The biography by Bruce Alexander Cook |
2016 (69th)
| 2016 (69th) | Arrival | Eric Heisserer | The story Story of Your Life by Ted Chiang |
| 2016 (69th) | Deadpool | Rhett Reese and Paul Wernick | The X-Men comic book character created by Fabian Nicieza and Rob Liefeld |
| 2016 (69th) | Fences | August Wilson | The play by Wilson |
| 2016 (69th) | Hidden Figures | Allison Schroeder and Theodore Melfi | The book by Margot Lee Shetterly |
| 2016 (69th) | Nocturnal Animals | Tom Ford | The novel Tony and Susan by Austin Wright |
2017 (70th)
| 2017 (70th) | Call Me by Your Name † | James Ivory | The novel by André Aciman |
| 2017 (70th) | The Disaster Artist | Scott Neustadter and Michael H. Weber | The book by Greg Sestero and Tom Bissell |
| 2017 (70th) | Logan | Scott Frank, James Mangold and Michael Green | The characters from the X-Men comic books and theatrical motion pictures |
| 2017 (70th) | Molly's Game | Aaron Sorkin | The memoir by Molly Bloom |
| 2017 (70th) | Mudbound | Virgil Williams and Dee Rees | The novel by Hillary Jordan |
2018 (71st)
| 2018 (71st) | Can You Ever Forgive Me? | Nicole Holofcener and Jeff Whitty | The memoir by Lee Israel |
| 2018 (71st) | Black Panther | Joe Robert Cole and Ryan Coogler | The Marvel Comics by Stan Lee and Jack Kirby |
| 2018 (71st) | BlacKkKlansman † | Spike Lee, David Rabinowitz, Charlie Wachtel and Kevin Willmott | The memoir Black Klansman by Ron Stallworth |
| 2018 (71st) | If Beale Street Could Talk | Barry Jenkins | The novel by James Baldwin |
| 2018 (71st) | A Star Is Born | Eric Roth, Bradley Cooper and Will Fetters | The 1954 screenplay by Moss Hart and the 1976 screenplay by John Gregory Dunne & Joan Didion and Frank Pierson, based on a story by William A. Wellman and Robert Carson |
2019 (72nd)
| 2019 (72nd) | Jojo Rabbit † | Taika Waititi | The novel Caging Skies by Christine Leunens |
| 2019 (72nd) | A Beautiful Day in the Neighborhood | Micah Fitzerman-Blue and Noah Harpster | The article "Can You Say ... Hero?" by Tom Junod |
| 2019 (72nd) | The Irishman | Steven Zaillian | The book I Heard You Paint Houses by Charles Brandt |
| 2019 (72nd) | Joker | Todd Phillips and Scott Silver | The characters from DC Comics |
| 2019 (72nd) | Little Women | Greta Gerwig | The novel by Louisa May Alcott |

=== 2020s ===
| Year | Film | Recipient(s) | Source material |
|---|---|---|---|
| 2020 (73rd) | Borat Subsequent Moviefilm | Sacha Baron Cohen, Anthony Hines, Dan Swimer, Peter Baynham, Erica Rivinoja, Dan Mazer, Jena Friedman, Lee Kern & Nina Pedrad | The characters created by Sacha Baron Cohen |
| 2020 (73rd) | Ma Rainey's Black Bottom | Ruben Santiago-Hudson | The play by August Wilson |
| 2020 (73rd) | News of the World | Paul Greengrass and Luke Davies | The novel by Paulette Jiles |
| 2020 (73rd) | One Night in Miami... | Kemp Powers | The stage play by Kemp Powers |
| 2020 (73rd) | The White Tiger | Ramin Bahrani | The book by Aravind Adiga |
| 2021 (74th) | CODA † | Siân Heder | The film La Famille Belier by Victoria Bedos, Thomas Bidegain, Stanislas Carree de Malberg, and Eric Lartigau |
| 2021 (74th) | Dune | Eric Roth, Jon Spaihts & Denis Villeneuve | The novel by Frank Herbert |
| 2021 (74th) | Nightmare Alley | Guillermo del Toro & Kim Morgan | The novel by William Lindsay Gresham |
| 2021 (74th) | tick…tick…BOOM! | Steven Levenson | The play by Jonathan Larson |
| 2021 (74th) | West Side Story | Tony Kushner | The stage play, by Leonard Bernstein, Arthur Laurents, Jerome Robbins, and Stephen Sondheim |
| 2022 (75th) | Women Talking † | Sarah Polley | The novel by Miriam Toews |
| 2022 (75th) | Black Panther: Wakanda Forever | Ryan Coogler and Joe Robert Cole | The Marvel Comics by Stan Lee and Jack Kirby |
| 2022 (75th) | Glass Onion: A Knives Out Mystery | Rian Johnson | The character Benoit Blanc, from the film Knives Out by Johnson |
| 2022 (75th) | She Said | Rebecca Lenkiewicz | The New York Times investigation by Jodi Kantor, Megan Twohey and Rebecca Corbett and the book by Jodi Kantor and Megan Twohey |
| 2022 (75th) | Top Gun: Maverick | Ehren Kruger, Eric Warren Singer and Christopher McQuarrie (screenplay), Peter Craig and Justin Marks (story) | Characters created by Jim Cash and Jack Epps Jr. |
| 2023 (76th) | American Fiction † | Cord Jefferson | The novel Erasure by Percival Everett |
| 2023 (76th) | Are You There God? It's Me, Margaret. | Kelly Fremon Craig | The novel by Judy Blume |
| 2023 (76th) | Killers of the Flower Moon | Eric Roth and Martin Scorsese | The book by David Grann |
| 2023 (76th) | Nyad | Julia Cox | The book Find a Way by Diana Nyad |
| 2023 (76th) | Oppenheimer | Christopher Nolan | The book American Prometheus: The Triumph and Tragedy of J. Robert Oppenheimer by Kai Bird and Martin J. Sherwin |
| 2024 (77th) | Nickel Boys | RaMell Ross and Joslyn Barnes | The novel The Nickel Boys by Colson Whitehead |
| 2024 (77th) | A Complete Unknown | James Mangold and Jay Cocks | The book Dylan Goes Electric! by Elijah Wald |
| 2024 (77th) | Dune: Part Two | Denis Villeneuve and Jon Spaihts | The novel by Frank Herbert |
| 2024 (77th) | Hit Man | Richard Linklater and Glen Powell | The Texas Monthly article by Skip Hollandsworth |
| 2024 (77th) | Wicked | Winnie Holzman and Dana Fox | The musical stage play with music and lyrics by Stephen Schwartz and book by Winnie Holzman, from the novel by Gregory Maguire |
| 2025 (78th) | One Battle After Another † | Paul Thomas Anderson | The novel Vineland by Thomas Pynchon |
| 2025 (78th) | Bugonia | Will Tracy | The film Save the Green Planet by Jang Joon-hwan |
| 2025 (78th) | Frankenstein | Guillermo del Toro | The novel by Mary Shelley |
| 2025 (78th) | Hamnet | Chloe Zhao and Maggie O'Farrell | The novel by Maggie O'Farrell |
| 2025 (78th) | Train Dreams | Clint Bentley and Greg Kwedar | The novella by Denis Johnson |

== Writers with multiple awards ==
3 Awards

- Alexander Payne
- Alvin Sargent

2 Awards

- Francis Ford Coppola
- Blake Edwards
- Mario Puzo
- Waldo Salt
- Jim Taylor

== Writers with multiple nominations ==
The following writers have received three or more nominations:

6 Nominations

- Steven Zaillian
- Eric Roth

4 Nominations

- Jay Presson Allen
- Elaine May
- Alexander Payne
- Neil Simon
- Aaron Sorkin

3 Nominations

- Scott Frank
- Ruth Prawer Jhabvala
- Richard Linklater
- David Mamet
- Anthony Minghella
- Mario Puzo
- Oliver Stone
- Jim Taylor
