= 44th Writers Guild of America Awards =

44th WGA Awards
- Date: 1992
- Organized by: Writers Guild of America, East and the Writers Guild of America, West

The 44th Writers Guild of America Awards honored the best television, and film writers of 1991. Winners were announced in 1992.

== Winners and nominees ==
=== Film ===
Winners are listed first highlighted in boldface.

**Best Screenplay Written Directly for the Screen**: **Thelma & Louise, Written by Callie Khouri**; Boyz n the Hood, Written by John Singleton; Bugsy, Written by James Toback; Grand Canyon, Written by Lawrence Kasdan, and Meg Kasdan; The Fisher King, Written by Richard LaGravenese	**Best Screenplay Based on Material from Another Medium**: **The Silence of the Lambs, Screenplay by Ted Tally; based on the novel by Thomas Harris**; Fried Green Tomatoes, Screenplay by Fannie Flagg, and Carol Sobieski; based on the novel by Fannie Flagg; JFK, Screenplay by Oliver Stone, and Zachary Sklar; based on the book by Jim Garrison and Jim Marrs; The Commitments, Screenplay by Dick Clement, Ian La Frenais, and Roddy Doyle; based on the novel by Roddy Doyle; The Prince of Tides, Screenplay by Pat Conroy, and Becky Johnston; based on the novel by Pat Conroy

=== Television ===
**Episodic Comedy**: **"Rat Girl" – Cheers (NBC) – Ken Levine, and David Isaacs**; "Christmas Brains" – Coach (ABC) – John Peaslee, and Judd Pillot; "A Day in the Life of Wood Newton" – Evening Shade (CBS) – Linda Bloodworth-Thomason; "Here's a Little Touch of Harry in the Night" – The Days and Nights of Molly Dodd (Lifetime) – Jay Tarses; "Ebbtide's Revenge" – The Golden Girls (NBC) – Marc Sotkin	**Episodic Drama**: **"Photo Opportunity" – Thirtysomething (ABC) – Racelle Rosett Schaefer**; "Hello Goodbye" – China Beach (ABC) – John Wells, John Sacret Young, Lydia Woodward, and Carol Flint; "Escape" – China Beach (ABC) – Paris Qualles, John Sacret Young, John Wells, Carol Flint, and Lydia Woodward; "Everybody's Favorite Bagman" – Law & Order (NBC) – Dick Wolf; "The Leap Home: Part 1 - November 25, 1969" – Quantum Leap (NBC) – Donald P. Bellisario; "Guns and Roses" – Thirtysomething (ABC) – Liberty Godshall
**Daytime Serials**: **Guiding Light (CBS) – N. Gail Lawrence, Nancy Curlee, Stephen Demorest, James E. Reilly, Melissa Salmons, Bill Elverman, Nancy Williams Watt, Michael Conforti, Pete T. Rich**; Santa Barbara (NBC) – Bridget Dobson, Jerome Dobson, Samuel D. Ratcliffe, Maralyn Thoma, Linda Hamner, Josh Griffith, Gary Tomlin, Courtney Simon, Robert Guza Jr., Richard Culliton, Lynda Myles, Michele Val Jean, Bettina F. Bradbury, Christopher Dunn, Mary Dobson, Frank Salisbury, Patrick Mulcahey, Meg Bennett; All My Children (ABC) – Agnes Nixon, Lorraine Broderick, Wisner Washam, Megan McTavish, Hal Corley, Mary K. Wells, Susan Kirshenbaum, Karen Lewis, Elizabeth Smith, Kathleen Klein, Gillian Spencer, Michelle Patrick; Days of Our Lives (NBC) – Anne Schoettle, Richard J. Allen, Gene Palumbo, Leah Laiman, Dena Higley, Marcia E. Greenlaw, Roberto Loiederman, Beth Milstein, Sheri Anderson, Michelle Poteet Lisanti, Mike Cohen, Maura Penders, Penina Spiegel, Marlene McPherson, Dwight D. Smith	**Original Long Form**: **Judgment (HBO) – Tom Topor**
**Adapted Long Form**: **Long Road Home (NBC) – Jane-Howard Hammerstein**	**Children's Script**: **"But He Loves Me" – CBS Schoolbreak Special (CBS) – Betty G. Birney**; "Down the Drain" – 3-2-1 Contact (PBS) – Michael Winship; "It's Only Rock and Roll" – CBS Schoolbreak Special (CBS) – Gordon Rayfield; "Abby, My Love" – CBS Schoolbreak Special (CBS) – Paul W. Cooper; "The Fourth Man" – CBS Schoolbreak Special (CBS) – Joanna Lee, and Annie Caroline Schuler

==== Documentary ====
**Documentary – Current Events**
- **Power in the Pacific (PBS) – Joseph Angier, and Carl Byker**

=== Special awards ===
Laurel Award for Screenwriting Achievement
**Frank Pierson**
Laurel Award for TV Writing Achievement
**Bob Carroll Jr., Jess Oppenheimer, and Madelyn Davis**
Valentine Davies Award
**Allan Burns**
Morgan Cox Award
**John Gay**
Paul Selvin Award
**George Stevens Jr.**
Edmund J. North Award
**William Ludwig**
