= 33rd Writers Guild of America Awards =

33rd WGA Awards
- Date: 1981
- Organized by: Writers Guild of America, East and the Writers Guild of America, West

The 33rd Writers Guild of America Awards honored the best television, and film writers of 1980. Winners were announced in 1981.

== Winners and nominees ==
=== Film ===
Winners are listed first highlighted in boldface.

| **Best Drama Written Directly for the Screen**: **Melvin and Howard, Written by Bo Goldman**; Fame, Written by Christopher Gore; My Bodyguard, Written by Alan Ormsby | **Best Comedy Written Directly for the Screen**: **Private Benjamin, Written by Nancy Meyers, Charles Shyer and Harvey Miller**; Nine to Five, Written by Colin Higgins and Patricia Resnick; Story by Patricia Resnick; Return of the Secaucus Seven, Written by John Sayles; Stardust Memories, Written by Woody Allen |
| **Best Drama Adapted from Another Medium**: **Ordinary People, Screenplay by Alvin Sargent; Based on the novel by Judith Guest**; Coal Miner's Daughter, Screenplay by Thomas Rickman; Based on the Loretta Lynn and George Vecsey autobiography; The Elephant Man, Screenplay by Christopher De Vore, Eric Bergren and David Lynch; Based on the book by Frederick Treves; The Great Santini, Screenplay by Lewis John Carlino; Based on the novel by Pat Conroy; The Stunt Man, Screenplay by Lawrence B. Marcus and Richard Rush; Based on the novel by Paul Brodeur | **Best Comedy Adapted from Another Medium**: **Airplane!, Screenplay by Jim Abrahams, David Zucker and Jerry Zucker; Based on the story by Arthur Hailey**; Hopscotch, Screenplay by Brian Garfield and Bryan Forbes; Based on the novel by Brian Garfield; Star Wars: Episode V - The Empire Strikes Back, Screenplay by Leigh Brackett and Lawrence Kasdan; Based on the story by George Lucas |

=== Television ===
| **Episodic Comedy**: **"Heal Thyself" – M*A*S*H (CBS) – Dennis Koenig and Gene Reynolds**; "The Child Stealers" – Barney Miller (ABC) – Frank Dungan and Jeff Stein; "Morale Victory" – M*A*S*H (CBS) – John Rappaport; "Bottle Fatigue" – M*A*S*H (CBS) – Thad Mumford, and Dan Wilcox; "Art Work" – Taxi (ABC) – Glen Charles and Les Charles; "Alex Jumps Out of an Airplane" – Taxi (ABC) - Ken Estin; "The Censors" – The Associates (ABC) – Stan Daniels and Ed. Weinberger; "Sometimes" – United States (NBC) – Larry Gelbart and Everett Greenbaum | **Episodic Drama**: **"Pilot: Part 1 & 2" – Tenspeed and Brown Shoe (ABC) – Stephen J. Cannell**; "Second Spring" – Little house on the Prairie (NBC) – John T. Dugan; "Inheritance" – Lou Grant (CBS) – April Smith; "Brushfire" – Lou Grant (CBS) – Allan Burns, and Gene Reynolds; "Blackout" – Lou Grant (CBS) – Steve Kline; "Dreams" – M*A*S*H (CBS) – Alan Aldan and James Jay Rubinfier; "Pilot" – Skag (NBC) – Abby Mann |
| **Daytime Serials**: **Ryan's Hope (ABC) – Paul Avila Mayer, Claire Labine, Mary Munisteri and Jeffrey Lane**; The Doctors (NBC) – Eugenie Hunt, Ann Marie Barlow and Ralph Ellis; Texas (NBC) – John William Corrington, Joyce Hooper Corrington, Ralph Adamo, Carole Berlin, Harry Boehm, Elizabeth Boehm, Patrick Mulcahey and John Saffron | **Children's Script - Episodic & Specials**: **"The Secret of Lost Valley" – Wonderful World of Disney (NBC) – Paul A. Golding and David Irving**; "Animal Talk" – CBS Library (CBS) – Kimmer Ringwald; "The Incredible Book Escape" – CBS Library (CBS) – George Arthur Bloom; "The Gold-Bug" – ABC Weekend Specials (ABC) – Edward Pomerantz |
**Variety, Musical or Comedy**: **All Commercials, A Steve Martin Special (NBC) – Steve Martin, Neal Israel, Jeffrey Barron, Earl Brown, Carmen Finestra, Denny Johnston, Sean Kelly, Pat McCormick, Michael McManus, Pat Proft and Mason Williams**

=== Special awards ===
Laurel Award for Screenwriting Achievement
**Ben Hecht**
Laurel Award for TV Writing Achievement
**Larry Gelbart**
Valentine Davies Award
**Arthur E. Orloff**
Morgan Cox Award
**Ronald Austin**
