= The Death of Santini =

2013 book by Pat Conroy

- First edition
- Author: Pat Conroy
- Language: English
- Genre: Autobiography, non-fiction, memoir
- Publisher: Random House
- Publication date: 2013
- Publication place: United States
- Media type: Print (hardback & paperback)
- Preceded by: The Great Santini

See also The Great Santini (film)

The Death of Santini: The Story of a Father and His Son is a 2013 memoir written by Pat Conroy. It complements the 1976 novel The Great Santini which was adapted into a 1979 film of the same name.

== Overview ==
Conroy writes a memoir of his love/hate relationship with his father, his father's abuse, and the transient life of the families of American military personnel.
