= Donald Conroy =

US Marine Corps officer

- Born: April 4, 1921; Chicago, Illinois
- Died: May 9, 1998 (aged 77); Beaufort, South Carolina
- Burial place: Beaufort National Cemetery
- Military career
- Allegiance: United States of America
- Branch: United States Marine Corps
- Service years: 1941–1974
- Rank: Colonel
- Unit: VMF-214
- Conflicts: World War II; Korean War; Battle of Pusan Perimeter; Battle of Inchon; Battle of Chosin Reservoir; Vietnam War

Donald Conroy (April 4, 1921 – May 9, 1998) was a United States Marine Corps colonel and a member of the Black Sheep Squadron during the Korean War. He was also a veteran of World War II and served two tours of duty during the Vietnam War. He is best known for being the inspiration for the character Lieutenant Colonel "Bull" Meecham in the novel The Great Santini, which was written by his son Pat Conroy.

== Life and career ==
Conroy was originally from Chicago and left Saint Ambrose College in Davenport, Iowa, to enlist in the Marines during World War II. He would later be commissioned an officer and become a pilot with VMF-214 when the Korean War began in June 1950. The squadron became the first Marine squadron to see action during the war, providing close air support and aerial interdiction during the Battle of Pusan Perimeter, Battle of Inchon and Battle of Chosin Reservoir while flying from the USS Sicily. During the Cuban Missile Crisis, Conroy was part of an A-4 Skyhawk squadron at Marine Corps Air Station Beaufort. They were alerted and would quickly deploy to Roosevelt Roads Naval Station where they would remain for the duration of the crisis. He would also serve two tours in Vietnam during the Vietnam War.

He and his wife Peggy had seven children: Donald Patrick "Pat", Carol, Mike, Kathy, Jim, Tim, and Tom. Novelist Pat Conroy used his father as the inspiration for the fictitious character Marine Lt. Col. "Bull" Meecham in The Great Santini (spelled "Meechum" in the 1979 movie version starring Robert Duvall). Pat Conroy wrote another autobiographical book called My Losing Season, and as in The Great Santini, talks about how his father was very violent and abusive both towards him and his siblings. (The abuse took psychological form for all the children, and was additionally physical towards the male siblings.) Pat's sister Carol was institutionalized with mental illness, his brother, Tom, developed schizophrenia (and later committed suicide at age 33), and Pat himself also attempted suicide in 1975. Pat indicated violent memories of his father haunted his every waking moment, a theme the author fictionalizes in his novel The Prince of Tides.

However, in later years, following his retirement from the Marines, Donald Conroy mended his relationships with his children. In The Pat Conroy Cookbook, Pat Conroy provides numerous stories of his close relationship with his father during adulthood. He writes that in writing The Great Santini, his father aided him by supplying technical details about military fighter planes, and that this helped to improve their relationship. When the book was published, Donald Conroy saw the character of Bull Meecham as a truthful tribute. Thereafter, he would accompany Pat to book signings and would sign his son's books with the signature, "Donald Conroy – The Great Santini."

When other writers asked me why I allowed this incursion, I explained that my father and I had to search for ways to say we loved each other without saying the words.

— Pat Conroy

After retirement, Conroy moved to Atlanta, Georgia. He died from colon cancer on May 9, 1998, and is interred at Beaufort National Cemetery, South Carolina. As Bull Meecham/Meechum is killed in the crash of his fighter in both the novel and movie versions of The Great Santini, and his funeral scene was filmed at the same cemetery for the movie, Conroy joked while planning his own funeral that it would be the second time he would be buried there.

== Awards and decorations ==
His decorations and medals include:

Naval Aviator Badge
Distinguished Flying Cross w/ 2 award stars		Air Medal w/ 4 award stars	Navy Presidential Unit Citation w/ 1 service star
Army Presidential Unit Citation	Navy Unit Commendation w/ 4 service stars	American Campaign Medal	Asiatic-Pacific Campaign Medal w/ 1 service star
World War II Victory Medal	Navy Occupation Service Medal	National Defense Service Medal w/ 1 service star	Korean Service Medal w/ 4 service stars
United Nations Korea Medal	Philippine Liberation Medal w/ 1 service star	Presidential Unit Citation (Philippines)	Presidential Unit Citation (Korea)

== See also ==
- United States Marine Corps Aviation
