= Lewis John Carlino =

American playwright, screenwriter, and film director (1932–2020)

- Born: January 1, 1932; New York City, New York, U.S.
- Died: June 17, 2020 (aged 88); Whidbey Island, Washington, U.S.
- Education: University of Southern California (B.A., 1958)
- Occupations: Playwright; screenwriter; film director
- Writing career
- Period: 1957–2011
- Military career
- Allegiance: United States
- Branch: United States Air Force
- Service years: 1951-1955
- Conflicts: Korean War

Lewis John Carlino (January 1, 1932 – June 17, 2020) was an American playwright, screenwriter, and film director. His best known works included the screenplays for Seconds (1966), The Fox (1967), The Brotherhood (1968), The Mechanic (1972), I Never Promised You a Rose Garden (1977), and Resurrection (1980). He wrote and directed the literary adaptations The Sailor Who Fell from Grace with the Sea (1976), based on a novel by Yukio Mishima; and The Great Santini (1979), based on a novel by Pat Conroy.

Carlino was nominated for an Academy Award for Best Adapted Screenplay for I Never Promised You a Rose Garden and a Golden Globe Award for Best Screenplay for The Fox. He was also a three-time Writers Guild of America Award nominee and a Drama Desk Award winner.

== Early life and education ==
Carlino was born in New York City, the son of an Italian immigrant from Sicily. He attended El Camino College before he was drafted into the United States Air Force in 1951. He served for four years during the Korean War, an experience that later inspired him to make the film The Great Santini. After his discharge, he used the G.I. Bill to enroll at the University of Southern California, where he studied drama. He graduated in 1958.

== Career ==
=== Theatrical work ===
One of Carlino's earliest works was a play, The Brick and the Rose; a collage for voices. It was published on December 12, 1957, and the first production took place that year in the Ivar Theatre, now part of the LA Film School, in Hollywood, California.

The script for The Brick and the Rose was distributed by the Dramatists Play Service beginning in 1959 and the play was presented on television as part of the CBS Repertoire Workshop on January 24, 1960.

Carlino continued to write for theater with some success with scripts regularly published by Dramatists Play Service and numerous performances in several venues including the American National Theatre and Academy and the John Golden Theatre. He won a Vernon Rice Award in 1964.

=== Filmmaking ===
Carlino's first screenwriting credit was And Make Thunder His Tribute, Episode 99 of the television series Route 66, which aired on November 1, 1963. That same month, Carlino was hired by Kirk Douglas' film production company, Joel Productions, to write the screenplay for Seconds, based on the novel by science fiction writer David Ely. The lead in the film was initially written for Douglas but the role was eventually played by Rock Hudson, with Joel Productions (co-headed by producer Edward Lewis) co-producing the film with John Frankenheimer Productions, director John Frankenheimer's film production company, and Gibraltar Productions, Hudson's film production company. This conspiracy thriller gained considerable attention as the final part of a loosely connected paranoia trilogy from the director. The film was submitted in competition at the 1966 Cannes Film Festival and was one of the nominees for the Palme D'Or.

In October 1963, it was reported that Carlino would adapt Jackson Donahue's novel The Confessor for producer Edward Lewis and director Frankenheimer as part of a one-off picture deal for The Mirisch Corporation. The film was to star Anthony Perkins (later replaced by Tony Curtis) and Henry Fonda, but the project never made it to film.

In November 1964, after months of development, Douglas and Lewis Productions (Kirk Douglas and Edward Lewis) announced that it would be co-producing Grand Prix with John Frankenheimer Productions. Grand Prix, a drama about the turbulent lives of racecar drivers, was to be directed by Frankenheimer using the new Cinerama single-lens process, and based on an original screenplay by Carlino. By September 1965, when the Metro-Goldwyn-Mayer contract for Grand Prix was finally concluded, Robert Alan Aurthur had replaced Carlino as screenwriter for the $9,000,000-budgeted film.

In October 1965, Douglas and Lewis Productions announced that it had secured a one-picture financing and distribution deal with Warner Brothers Pictures for The Hoods. The Hoods (later released as The Brotherhood), was an original screenplay by Carlino about the mafia and was to star Douglas. Edward Lewis was to produce the film while Martin Ritt would direct and co-produce through his film production company, Martin Ritt Productions. The filming of The Brotherhood was delayed considerably due to Douglas' other commitments, and Warner Brothers Pictures' option eventually expired, leading the producers to eventually secure a $3,500,000 financing and distributing deal through Paramount Pictures in May 1967. The movie was filmed on location in Sicily on September 14, 1967, followed by New York City locations in October 1967. The Brotherhood opened in December 1968 and was generally well-received during previews. Carlino was nominated for a Writers Guild of America Award for Best Written American Original Screenplay.

Another property acquired around this time by Douglas and Lewis Productions was Yukio Mishima's The Sailor Who Fell From Grace With the Sea, with Carlino assigned to write the screenplay. Ten years later, Carlino would direct the film, with no ties to Douglas and Lewis Productions.

Carlino next worked with screenwriter Howard Koch on the adaptation of the 1923 novella The Fox by D. H. Lawrence. The 1967 film (starring Sandy Dennis, Anne Heywood, and Keir Dullea), won a Best Foreign Film Golden Globe Award, and Heywood earned the Best Actress award. The screenplay by Carlino and Koch was nominated for the Golden Globe for Best Screenplay of 1967.

In 1970 he wrote an adaptation of the classic Robert Heinlein novel Stranger in a Strange Land, picked up by Warner Bros and listed for production in early 1971. The movie was never made.

Carlino wrote the original story and the screenplay for the 1972 film The Mechanic, which stars Charles Bronson and Jan-Michael Vincent. The film is noted for opening with no dialog for the first 16 minutes and for its surprise ending.

In 1976, Carlino finally directed Yukio Mishima's 1963 novel The Sailor Who Fell from Grace with the Sea for the screen and directed the film of the same title which starred Kris Kristofferson and Sarah Miles.

Carlino and Gavin Lambert received an Oscar nomination and the Writers Guild of America Award nomination for the Best Adapted Screenplay of 1977 for I Never Promised You a Rose Garden.

Carlino wrote and directed The Great Santini, based on the 1976 novel by Pat Conroy. The film tells the story of a United States Marine Corps Officer whose success as a military aviator contrasts with his shortcomings as a husband and father. The film stars Robert Duvall, Blythe Danner, Michael O'Keefe, Lisa Jane Persky, Julie Anne Haddock, Brian Andrews, Stan Shaw, and David Keith. Carlino was nominated for the Writers Guild of America Award of 1979 for the Best Drama Adapted from Another Medium. The Great Santini received two Academy Award nominations: Best Actor in a Leading Role (Duvall) and Best Actor in a Supporting Role (O'Keefe).

In 1980, Carlino did the original writing and screenplay for Resurrection and was nominated by the Academy of Science Fiction, Fantasy and Horror Films for the Saturn Award for Best Writing of 1980.

In 1988, he wrote the screenplay for the film Haunted Summer, fictionalized retelling of the Shelleys' visit to Lord Byron in Villa Diodati by Lake Geneva, which led to the writing of Frankenstein.

The Mechanic was remade in 2011 by director Simon West, starring Jason Statham and Ben Foster. Carlino retained a "Screenplay by" and "Story by" credit for his original 1972 script.

== Personal life ==
Carlino was married twice, first to Natelle Lamkin and then to Jilly Chadwick. He had three children from his first marriage, two of his children predeceased him.

Beginning in 1996, Carlino and his wife Jill (d. 2015) resided on Whidbey Island, Washington, where he co-founded the Whidbey Island Center for the Arts and directed stage productions.

=== Death ===
Carlino died of myelodysplastic syndrome on June 17, 2020, aged 88.

== Stage plays ==
- The Brick and the Rose
- Snowangel
- Epiphany
- The Dirty Old Man
- The Exercise
- High Sign
- Junk Yard
- Mr. Flannery's Ocean
- Objective Case
- Sarah and the Sax
- The School for Scandal (adaptation)
- Telemachus Clay
- Used Car for Sale

Ref:

== Filmography ==
=== Film ===
Year	Title	Writer	Director
1976	The Sailor Who Fell from Grace with the Sea	Yes	Yes
1979	The Great Santini	Yes	Yes
1983	Class	No	Yes

==== Writer only ====
Year	Title	Director	Notes
1966	Seconds	John Frankenheimer	
1966	Grand Prix	John Frankenheimer	Uncredited
1967	The Fox	Mark Rydell	Co-writer with Howard Koch
1969	The Brotherhood	Martin Ritt	
1972	A Reflection of Fear	William A. Fraker	
1972	The Mechanic	Michael Winner	
1974	Crazy Joe	Carlo Lizzani	
1977	I Never Promised You a Rose Garden	Anthony Page	
1980	Resurrection	Daniel Petrie	
1988	Haunted Summer	Ivan Passer	
2011	The Mechanic	Simon West	Remake of 1972 film
2016	Mechanic: Resurrection	Dennis Gansel	Characters created by

=== Television ===
Year	Title	Writer	Creator	Notes
1960, 1967	Johnny Midnight	Yes	No	Episode: "The Switchback Murder", "Sarah and the Sax"
1960	CBS Repertoire Workshop	Yes	No	Episode: "The Brick and the Rose"
1966	Route 66	Yes	No	Episode: "And Make Thunder His Tribute"
1971	In Search of America	Yes	No	Television film
1973	Honor Thy Father	Yes	No	Television film
1973-74	Doc Elliot	Yes	Yes	Writer; 1 episode
1974	Where Have All the People Gone?	Yes	No	Television film
1999	Resurrection	Yes	No	Television film Remake of 1980 film

== Awards and nominations ==
Award	Year	Category	Work(s)	Result	Ref.
Academy Award	1978	Best Adapted Screenplay	I Never Promised You a Rose Garden	Nominated	
Golden Globe Award	1968	Best Screenplay	The Fox	Nominated	
Saturn Award	1981	Best Writing	Resurrection	Nominated	
Writers Guild of America Award	1969	Best Original Screenplay	The Brotherhood	Nominated	
Writers Guild of America Award	1978	Best Adapted Screenplay	I Never Promised You a Rose Garden	Nominated	
Writers Guild of America Award	1981	Best Adapted Screenplay	The Great Santini	Nominated	
Drama Desk Award	1964	Vernon Rice Award	Cages, Telemachus Clay, Double Talk	Won	
