= Beach Music (novel) =

1995 novel by Pat Conroy

- Author: Pat Conroy
- Language: English
- Publisher: Doubleday
- Publication date: July 1995
- Publication place: United States
- Media type: Print (hardback and paperback)
- Pages: 640 (hardback edition)
- ISBN: 0-385-41304-1 (hardback edition)
- OCLC: 54817555
- Dewey Decimal: 813/.54 20
- LC Class: PS3553.O5198 B43 1995
- Preceded by: The Prince of Tides

Beach Music is Pat Conroy's novel about Jack McCall, a South Carolina native who flees the South with his daughter Leah after his wife commits suicide. This novel explores the Vietnam War-era, the Holocaust, and coming of age in the 20th century. It was published in 1995.

== Plot introduction ==
Jack McCall, an American living in Rome with his daughter, is trying to find peace after the recent trauma of his wife's suicide, but his search for solitude is disturbed when a telegram from a family member summons Jack back to South Carolina to be with his ailing mother. He begins to explore his past and all its demons, as well as a new mystery: His sister-in-law and two school friends invite Jack to help them track down another classmate who went underground as a Vietnam protester and never resurfaced. As Jack begins a journey that encompasses the past and the present in both Europe and the American South, he also begins a quest that will lead him to shocking truths—and ultimately to catharsis, acceptance and maturity.

== Writing and publication ==
Conroy began writing Beach Music as a way of coping with his own mother's death in 1984. Ten years later, he submitted 2,100 typed pages to Doubleday editor Nan A. Talese. With Conroy's consent and help, she trimmed it into a much shorter version. The book reached the top position on the New York Times Best Seller list. Paramount Pictures purchased the rights for $5.1 million, but as of 2015, still hasn't made it into a movie. Scripts were written (and rewritten several times), and Brad Pitt was at one point offered the part. Interviewed in 2009, Conroy said the film plans are "still hanging out there."

== Themes ==
Like The Prince of Tides, Conroy's earlier novel, Beach Music deals with "picking away at life's wounds with a sharp wit".

Some other (potentially controversial) themes in the novel include:

- Suicide, as Jack deals with Shyla's suicidal leap from the South Carolina bridge by escaping to Rome in order to avoid traumatic family drama
- War, from the terrors of the Holocaust discussed by Jewish characters and the Vietnam War's effects on those left behind
- Mental illness, as Jack's youngest brother, John Hardin, who has bouts of schizophrenia
- Loss of innocence
- Self-awareness and acceptance of self and of personal heritage
- Finding forgiveness from others and from ourselves
- Abuse of power
- Death
- Grief
- Southern United States
- Southern Aristocracy
- Story-telling

== Setting ==
Setting holds as much importance in Beach Music as its themes, or even the main character, Jack McCall. Pat Conroy acknowledged in an interview that the perception that he is "the product of a single landscape is actually false". As a military kid, Conroy moved often and lived in Rome, Italy for three years before finding his longest lasting home in Beaufort, South Carolina. Both of these locales hold great significance for Jack McCall in Beach Music. He runs from the traditions and his past in the southern atmosphere of South Carolina, and seeks refuge in the food and travel of Rome, Italy.

Waterford, South Carolina represents all that Jack wishes to forget, namely his wife, Shyla's, suicidal jump off Silas Pearman Bridge.

Rome, Italy represents the shield Jack uses to protect his daughter Leah from their family's tumultuous past, as well as his own discomfort with dealing with that past.

== Characters ==
- Jack McCall – The main character in the novel, Jack, is coping with the recent suicide of his wife, Shyla. A cookbook and travel writer, he flees Waterford to the peaceful life of a Roman Piazza with his daughter Leah. He is the oldest of the five McCall brothers. Jack is the narrator, and to some extent his character flaws and passions make him an unreliable narrator, though he's always an honest one.
- Leah McCall – the daughter of Jack McCall and Shyla Fox. There is an ugly custody dispute over Leah involving Jack and Shyla's parents (after her death), but a final letter that Shyla left for Jack proves his adequacy as a parent.
- Shyla Fox – Jack's wife, daughter of George and Ruth Fox. Commits suicide by jumping from the Silas Pearlman Bridge.
- Dupree McCall – The second oldest of the McCall brothers, Dupree works in the state mental hospital. His occupation often bears with it the burden of his younger brother, John Hardin, who has schizophrenia.
- Dallas McCall – The third oldest of the McCall brothers, he is a law partner with "The Judge" in Waterford.
- Tee McCall – The fourth oldest of the McCall brothers, Tee is a teacher for autistic children in Georgetown County.
- John Hardin McCall – The youngest of all five McCall brothers, John Hardin has a variety of psychological illnesses and often spends time in the mental hospital in Columbia, SC.
- Martha Fox – Shyla's younger sister.
- Ruth Fox – Shyla's mother; Leah's grandmother.
- Judge Johnson Hagood McCall – Jack's father and the town's functioning drunk, "The Judge" has been divorced from Jack's mother for years, but he pines after her still.
- Lucy McCall – Mother of the five McCall brothers. Diagnosed with leukemia, Lucy wants to spend her remaining days on the beach, surrounded by her family and the endangered loggerhead sea turtles. It is her illness that summons Jack and Leah out of Italy and back to the states.
- Silas McCall – "The Judge's" father; Jack's grandfather.
- Jordan Elliot – A close friend of Jack's, he moved to Waterford when the two were in high school. A military brat with a tyrant father, Jordan struggled against authority in his youth. He is caught in a scandal which has motivated him to retreat to/hide in the priesthood in Italy, which is where he and Jack reconnect.
- Mike Hess – Another one of Jack's high school friends, Mike is a Hollywood producer. He wants to tell the story of their childhood through a mini-series that he hopes to produce. Having recalled Mike as one of the nicest guys from his youth, Jack recognizes (as does Mike, himself) that Hollywood has changed Mike for the worse.
- Ledare Ansley – Capers Middleton's ex-wife, Ledare is one of Jack's childhood friends. Beautiful and charming, Ledare becomes more and more important to Jack as the novel progresses.
- Capers Middleton – Another friend of Jack's from high school. His father's heritage is known for their aristocracy and political prowess in South Carolina. Capers hopes to run for governor of South Carolina. After back-stabbing Jack in college, he tries to reinstate his friendship with him after Shyla's death.
- Max Russoff – Ruth's adopted father; after Ruth went through the Holocaust it was Max "The Great Jew" who rescued her from Poland.
