= The Exercise =

1968 American play

- 1968 Broadway production playbill
- Original language: English
- Written by: Lewis John Carlino

Premiere
- Date: 15 April 1968
- Place: John Golden Theatre

The Exercise is a 1968 American two-hander play about an acting exercise.

== Plot ==
There were two roles in the play: The Actress, played by Anne Jackson, and The Actor, played by Stephen Joyce (though this role originally was to be performed by Lou Antonio). The characters, who had a two-year affair which ended two years before the start of the play, sought to hurt one another through improv acting exercises. In one improvisational exercise, the actress pretended to be in childbirth and the actor, her fetus, an exercise intended to be cruel as the actress revealed that she had had an abortion.

== Production history ==
The Exercise was written by Lewis John Carlino and was his first Broadway production. It was directed by Alfred Ryder with lighting by Jean Rosenthal, setting by Oliver Smith, and sound by Teiji Ito. It was produced by Lyn Austin, Oliver Smith, Jay C. Cohen, and Leslie J. Stark, in association with Ann McIntosh. The production, housed at the John Golden Theatre, had ten preview performances and opened on April 24, 1968. After five regular performances, the show closed on April 27, 1968.

As of 2026, the licensing of the play is owned by Concord Theatricals.

== Critical reception ==
The play was profiled in the William Goldman book The Season: A Candid Look at Broadway, where it was described as boring. The Central New Jersey Home News panned it as "drab and dreary" and The New York Daily News called it a "limp backstage drama" and claimed that the characters were uninteresting. In contrast, the Long Island Press described it as "a gripping and completely fascinating portrait of a man and woman."
