= Caryl Heller =

- Occupation: Set decorator
- Years active: 1979-1995

Caryl Heller is a set decorator. She was nominated for an Academy Award in the category Best Art Direction for the film The Prince of Tides.

== Selected filmography ==
- The Prince of Tides (1991)
