= 1966–67 The Citadel Bulldogs basketball team =

American college basketball season

1966–67 The Citadel Bulldogs men's basketball
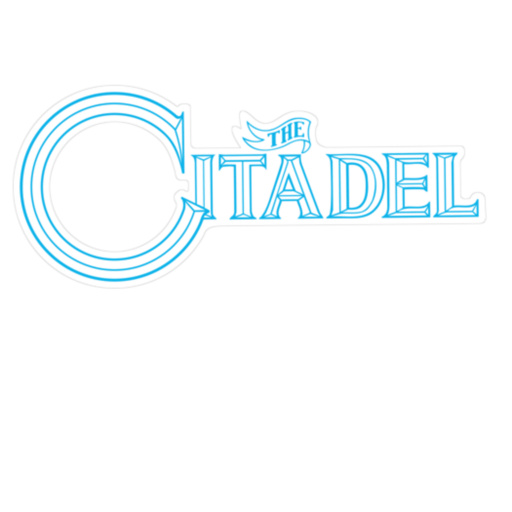
- Conference: Southern Conference
- Record: 8–17 (6–7 SoCon)
- Head coach: Mel Thompson
- Assistant coach: Ed Thompson
- Home arena: The Citadel Armory

1966–67 Southern Conference men's basketball standings
	Conf.				Overall
Team	W		L	PCT	W		L	PCT
West Virginia †	9	–	1	.900	19	–	9	.679
Davidson	8	–	4	.667	15	–	12	.556
William & Mary	8	–	5	.615	14	–	11	.560
Richmond	9	–	7	.563	11	–	12	.478
The Citadel	6	–	7	.462	8	–	16	.333
George Washington	5	–	7	.417	6	–	18	.250
Furman	4	–	6	.400	9	–	15	.375
East Carolina	4	–	8	.333	7	–	17	.292
VMI	4	–	12	.250	5	–	16	.238
† Southern Conference Tournament winner Rankings from AP Poll

The 1966–67 The Citadel Bulldogs basketball team represented The Citadel, The Military College of South Carolina in the 1966–67 NCAA University Division men's basketball season. The Bulldogs were led by seventh year head coach Mel Thompson and played their home games at The Citadel Armory. They played as a member of the Southern Conference.

The Bulldogs struggled throughout the season, enduring a three-game losing streak and two separate four game losing streaks while only recording consecutive wins twice in the season en route to an 8–17 overall finish, and 6–7 in the SoCon.

The season was later chronicled by Pat Conroy in his memoir My Losing Season. Conroy was a senior point guard and team Captain for the Bulldogs in the 1966–67 season.

== Roster ==
1966–67 The Citadel Bulldogs men's basketball team
Players
Coaches

Pos.	#	Name	Height	Weight	Year	Hometown
G	11	Bill Zinsky	6 ft 5 in (1.96 m)	185 lb (84 kg)	So	Glassboro, Illinois
G	12	John DeBrosse	5 ft 11 in (1.8 m)	170 lb (77 kg)	Jr	Piqua, Ohio
F	15	Tee Hooper	6 ft 3 in (1.91 m)	175 lb (79 kg)	So	Greenville, South Carolina
G	20	Jim Halpin	6 ft 2 in (1.88 m)	185 lb (84 kg)	Jr	Philadelphia, Pennsylvania
C	21	Bob Cauthen	6 ft 3 in (1.91 m)	180 lb (82 kg)	Jr	Rock Hill, South Carolina
G	22	Pat Conroy (C)	5 ft 10 in (1.78 m)	175 lb (79 kg)	Sr	Washington, D.C.
F	23	Greg Conner	6 ft 5 in (1.96 m)	200 lb (91 kg)	So	Morris, Illinois
C	30	Dan Mohr	6 ft 7 in (2.01 m)	220 lb (100 kg)	Sr	Wilmington, North Carolina
F	31	Al Kroboth	6 ft 2 in (1.88 m)	210 lb (95 kg)	So	Linden, New Jersey
F	32	Doug Bridges	6 ft 3 in (1.91 m)	195 lb (88 kg)	Jr	Raleigh, North Carolina
F	33	Brian Kennedy	6 ft 5 in (1.96 m)	190 lb (86 kg)	So	North Andover, Massachusetts
C	34	Dave Bornhorst	6 ft 3 in (1.91 m)	195 lb (88 kg)	Jr	Piqua, Ohio

Head coach

- Mel Thompson

Assistant coach(es)

- Ed Thompson

Legend

- (C) Team captain
- (S) Suspended
- (I) Ineligible
- (W) Walk-on
- Injured
- Current redshirt

Roster
Last update: November 19, 2026

== Schedule ==
Date time, TV	Opponent	Result	Record	Site city, state
December 1, 1966*	Auburn	L 83–105	0–1	The Citadel Armory; Charleston, South Carolina
December 3, 1966*	at Clemson	L 84–102	0–2	Fike Field House; Clemson, South Carolina
December 6, 1966*	Wofford	W 84–75	1–2	The Citadel Armory; Charleston, South Carolina
December 10, 1966	George Washington	W 89–86	2–2 (1–0)	The Citadel Armory; Charleston, South Carolina
December 14, 1966*	Old Dominion	L 70–78	2–3	The Citadel Armory; Charleston, South Carolina
December 17, 1966*	at Loyola (New Orleans)	L 87–97	2–4	New Orleans, Louisiana
December 19, 1966*	vs. Florida State; Tampa Invitational	L 67–83	2–5	Tampa, Florida
December 20, 1966*	vs. Columbia; Tampa Invitational	W 74–71	3–5	Tampa, Florida
January 2, 1967*	Jacksonville	L 80–87	3–6	The Citadel Armory; Charleston, South Carolina
January 4, 1967*	at Georgia Southern	L 78–79	3–7	Statesboro, Georgia
January 7, 1967	Richmond	W 81–79	4–7 (2–0)	The Citadel Armory; Charleston, South Carolina
January 10, 1967	Davidson	L 72–76	4–8 (2–1)	The Citadel Armory; Charleston, South Carolina
January 14, 1967	at Furman	L 68–85	4–9 (2–2)	Greenville Memorial Auditorium; Greenville, South Carolina
January 16, 1967	at East Carolina	L 72–80	4–10 (2–3)	Greenville, North Carolina
January 26, 1967*	at Jacksonville	L 85–87	4–11	Jacksonville, Florida
January 28, 1967	William & Mary	W 85–77	5–11 (3–3)	The Citadel Armory; Charleston, South Carolina
February 3, 1967	at VMI	W 73–70	6–11 (4–3)	Cormack Field House; Lexington, Virginia
February 4, 1967	at William & Mary	L 57–91	6–12 (4–4)	Blow Gymnasium; Williamsburg, Virginia
February 8, 1967	East Carolina	W 105–91	7–12 (5–4)	The Citadel Armory; Charleston, South Carolina
February 11, 1967	at Richmond	L 76–89	7–13 (5–5)	Richmond Arena; Richmond, Virginia
February 13, 1967	VMI	W 81–78	8–13 (6–5)	The Citadel Armory; Charleston, South Carolina
February 18, 1967	Furman	L 65–71	8–14 (6–6)	The Citadel Armory; Charleston, South Carolina
February 20, 1967*	at Stetson	L 74–82	8–15	DeLand, Florida
February 25, 1967	Davidson	L 85–97	8–16 (6–7)	The Citadel Armory; Charleston, South Carolina
1967 Southern Conference men's basketball tournament
March 2, 1967	vs. Richmond	L 98–100 ^{OT}	8–17	Charlotte Coliseum; Charlotte, North Carolina
*Non-conference game. (#) Tournament seedings in parentheses.
