= My Losing Season =

2002 memoir by Pat Conroy

- Media type: Print (Hardback & Paperback)
- Pages: 416 pp (hardback edition)
- ISBN: 0-385-48912-9
- Preceded by: The Pat Conroy Cookbook: Recipes of My Life
- Followed by: South of Broad

My Losing Season is a memoir by Pat Conroy. It primarily deals with his senior season as the starting point guard on the basketball team of The Citadel in 1966–67. Conroy describes his tumultuous relationship with his coach, Mel Thompson, as well as the harsh, malevolent, male-dominated society of The Citadel. Pat Conroy tells the story using flashbacks going back to his rough childhood where he remembers growing up with a tough father. He describes one memory when his mother tried to stab his father with a butcher knife and his father backhanded her and started laughing. The book also deals with the team's experience of losing. In his final season, his team finished with an 8–17 record.
