= South of Broad =

2009 novel by Pat Conroy

- First edition
- Author: Pat Conroy
- Language: English
- Publisher: Doubleday
- Publication date: August 11, 2009
- Publication place: United States
- Pages: 528
- ISBN: 978-0-385-41305-3
- OCLC: 264669827
- Dewey Decimal: 813/.54 22
- LC Class: PS3553.O5198 S68 2009
- Preceded by: My Losing Season

South of Broad is a 2009 novel by Pat Conroy. The novel follows the life of Leopold Bloom King in Charleston, South Carolina. It ranges from his troubled childhood to his adult life with his close group of friends.

== Plot summary ==
The story is divided into five parts.

Part one focuses on introducing the reader to Leopold Bloom King (Leo), his family, and his set of friends whom he meets on a fateful Bloomsday (June 16, 1969). Leo is the narrator of the story who gradually reveals his troubled childhood which was traumatized by the sudden and unforeseen suicide of his older brother Steve. He reveals himself to be a paper-boy for the South of Broad delivery area, thus introducing the reader to the Charleston neighborhood. Hints at a previous run-in with the law are given and he will exit his parole period that summer. He then introduces the reader to his loving father and strict mother and how their life stories shaped their characters. An influential Catholic priest named Monsignor Max is also introduced, who proves to be lifelong companion to Leo's mother after Leo's father passes away.

On Bloomsday, 1969, Leo performs a series of tasks that leads him to meet his soon-to-be friends. He bakes cookies for his new dramatic neighbors Sheba and Trevor Poe and their alcoholic mother. He then meets the two orphans Niles and Starla, whom he finds tied down to chairs, and wins their confidence by untying them. He then appears with his mother at a gathering at the Charleston yacht club where he meets Chad, Molly, and Fraser, three affluent teens, two of whom were kicked out of their respective private schools. Lastly, he meets his new high school football coach (the coach is black and will coach the first ever integrated team at Peninsula High) and later will meet Ike, the coach's fiery and talented son who will co-captain the team with Leo. Eventually, all the characters (including Betty, another orphan) will meet each other and become friendly, despite the major differences and cultural struggles between black and white, city and country, and rich and poor.

Part two of the story occurs twenty years later, when Leo (who is now a newspaper columnist) is interrupted from work by Sheba Poe, who is now a famous actress who flew back to Charleston from Hollywood. After a series of embarrassing moments and behavior for Sheba, during which time Leo's old high school friends unite, Sheba reveals that she has lost contact with her brother Trevor, whom she suspects is dying of AIDS in San Francisco at the height of its outbreak among the gay community. Leo, who had, since that time, married and separated from a mentally-ill Starla, reveals his love for Molly, who has grown apart from her philandering husband Chad.

Part three is set in San Francisco, where Leo and his friends go to find Trevor. After volunteering with a food bank, the characters discover the shocking conditions of people with AIDS and the devastating effects the virus has on its victims. A tip from an unlikely source results in a daring rescue attempt to find Trevor, who is found close to death and trapped in a crumbling building in the Tenderloin area. The friends then return to Charleston with Trevor, but not after a frightening encounter with Trevor and Sheba's father, who terrorizes the friends with his mystery and his violent antics. Leo and Molly become increasingly close to one another.

Part four is a flashback to 1969 which follows the success of Peninsula High's football team and retraces Leo and his friends' ever-strengthening friendships. A series of incidents involving Chad's behavior stretches the friendships at times and reveals hints at future problems and character flaws for several characters. The histories of Sheba, Trevor, Niles, and Starla are revealed and are emotionally damaging. Leo reveals a positive story from his life: his luck when a lonely antique store shopkeeper he cared for during his parole died and left Leo with a home on Tradd Street and a large fortune from the inheritance.

Part five returns to Charleston in 1989, where the friends' success in finding Trevor is darkened by increasing fears because of threats made by Sheba and Trevor's father through terrifying correspondence. Sheba informs Leo that she is seeking a normal life and begs him to marry her. Meanwhile, Starla returns to Charleston and in a severe moment informs Leo that she had aborted two fetuses that would have been Leo's children. It is in that moment that Leo decides after years of steadily clinging to his marriage due to Catholic vows that he and Starla can no longer be a husband and wife. Leo later finds out from police that a pregnant Starla has committed suicide.

In spite of increasing fears for her safety and security due to her father's threats, Sheba refuses to leave her teenage home and her dementia-crippled mother, though Leo convinces her to let Trevor live with him. Soon, Sheba is found murdered one morning with her mother appearing to be the assailant (it is later determined that her father was the murderer). Following a massive funeral, the friends must turn their attention to the menacing Hurricane Hugo which is headed for Charleston. Following the catastrophic storm, the friends soon discover the remains of a person who had been hiding out in a shed behind Niles and Fraser's house. It is later discovered to be Sheba and Trevor's father, who had the intention of killing the group during the hurricane but wound up drowning due to the storm surge.

As the city recovers and rebuilds, Leo and Molly go out to Sullivan's Island together to find Molly's grandmother's house in ruins, though they rescue a porpoise. During that moment, Leo and Molly reach the conclusion that they can never be together romantically and that their relationship would remain platonic. In the months following the hurricane, Leo continues to take care of Trevor, who seems healthy but continues to lose weight. Trevor reveals a desire to get back to San Francisco. Leo's mother decides to return to a nun's convent and Leo begins to experience a normalizing of relations between mother and son.

Just as it appears Leo's life is coming together, Trevor reveals a most damaging revelation - in his pornographic video collection, Trevor finds an old tape inside a sealed case that shows a young Monsignor Max raping Steve around the time of his suicide. Enraged, Leo confronts a dying Monsignor Max the night before the priest passes away. After a week of tributes, Leo writes a detailed column revealing Max's criminality before entering a mental hospital at the recommendation of a psychiatrist. The story ends with a series of dreams Leo has about his deceased family and friends who encourage him to live his life, even if it must be an act of normalcy. He awakens from the dreams to befriend a female nurse as he prepares to leave the institution and the traumatic experiences of his life, looking boldly into the future.

== Reception ==
Reception for South of Broad has been mixed, though generally more positive than negative. The Washington Post called the book "a big sweeping novel of friendship and marriage" with "passages in the novel that are lush and beautiful and precise." The St. Louis Post-Dispatch called it "brilliant", evoking "anger, joy, and sorrow". The New York Times praised Conroy as "[a] magician of the page" but found Conroy's technique to be "constricting" for the novel. The Dallas Morning News called it a "gushy mess", while the Los Angeles Times suggested that "[p]art of the problem is the pacing of the story... tragic twists just appear, lacking the kind of buildup that makes them work." Charleston's Post and Courier dubbed the novel "South of Absurd" and suggested that "at nearly every point, Conroy is either trying too hard or not hard enough."

At the time of its launch, reviewers were split on the literary value of South of Broad, but Kirkus Reviews managed to make sense of its parallel running plots: "First novel in 14 years from the gifted spinner of Southern tales (Beach Music, 1995, etc.)—a tail-wagging shaggy dog at turns mock-epic and gothic, beautifully written throughout. The title refers, meaningfully, to a section of Charleston, S.C., and, as with so many Southern tales, one great story begets another and another. This one starts most promisingly: 'Nothing happens by accident.'"

Booklist noted that "Conroy fleshes out the almost impossibly dramatic details of each of the friends' lives in this vast, intricate story, and he reveals truths about love, lust, classism, racism, religion, and what it means to be shaped by a particular place, be it Charleston, South Carolina, or anywhere else in the U.S. The combination of all these disparate elements bears the unmistakable makings of a spirit-shaping saga."

According to Conroy's literary agency, soon after the book was released, the publisher remarked: "South of Broad hit all possible best seller list[sic] and is selling at a pass never seen 'this side of Tom Clancy' so to speak. Therefore it's going back to press, it already has, for a few tens of thousands more copies."
