= The Prince of Tides =

1991 American film by Barbra Streisand

- Theatrical release poster
- Directed by: Barbra Streisand
- Screenplay by: Pat Conroy; Becky Johnston
- Based on: The Prince of Tides by Pat Conroy
- Produced by: Barbra Streisand; Andrew Karsch
- Starring: Barbra Streisand; Nick Nolte; Blythe Danner; Kate Nelligan; Jeroen Krabbé; Melinda Dillon; George Carlin; Jason Gould
- Cinematography: Stephen Goldblatt
- Edited by: Don Zimmerman
- Music by: James Newton Howard
- Distributed by: Columbia Pictures
- Release date: December 25, 1991
- Running time: 132 minutes
- Country: United States
- Language: English
- Budget: $30 million
- Box office: $135 million

The Prince of Tides is a 1991 American romantic drama film directed and co-produced by Barbra Streisand and written by Pat Conroy and Becky Johnston, based on Conroy's 1986 novel. Starring Streisand and Nick Nolte, it tells the story of the narrator's struggle to overcome the psychological damage inflicted by his dysfunctional childhood in South Carolina.

The film was nominated for seven Academy Awards, including Best Picture. A television series adaptation was stated to be in development for Apple TV+.

== Plot ==
Tom Wingo, a teacher and football coach from South Carolina, is asked by his mother, Lila, to travel to New York City to help his twin sister Savannah's psychiatrist, Susan Lowenstein, after Savannah's latest suicide attempt. Tom hates New York but reluctantly accepts, largely to take the opportunity to be alone and away from a life that does not satisfy him.

During his initial meetings with Lowenstein, Tom is reluctant to disclose many details of their dysfunctional family's secrets. In flashbacks, he relates incidents from his childhood to Lowenstein in hopes of discovering how to save Savannah's life. The Wingo parents were an abusive father, Henry, and a manipulative, status-hungry mother, Lila. The father was a shrimp boat operator and, despite being successful, spent his money on frivolous business pursuits, leaving the family in poverty.

Tom is also torn by his own problems but hides behind what he calls "the Southern way"—laughing at things instead of crying. For example, his wife Sallie is having an affair, and her lover wants to marry her.

Tom and Lowenstein begin to have feelings for each other. After Tom discovers that she is married to Herbert Woodruff, a famous concert violinist, Lowenstein introduces Tom to her son Bernard, who is being groomed to become a musician as well but secretly wants to play football.

Tom starts coaching Bernard along with attending sessions with Lowenstein to help his sister. He discovers that Savannah has been in such a dissociated state that she even had a different identity, Renata Halpern. As Halpern, she wrote books to disguise the Savannah side of her troubled life. Tom confronts Lowenstein over not revealing this information before, and they argue. To apologize, she asks him to dinner, and their relationship becomes closer.

Tom has a fateful meeting with his mother and stepfather, bringing up painful memories. He reveals to Lowenstein that, when he was 13, three escaped convicts invaded his home and raped him, his mother, and his sister. His older brother, Luke, killed two of the aggressors with a shotgun, while his mother stabbed the third with a kitchen knife. The family cleaned up the blood and buried the bodies beneath the house that night. Their mother made them swear never to mention the incident again. So not even the police were notified. Immediately, Savannah's mental health begins to decline.

Discovering that Tom has been coaching Bernard, Herbert orders Bernard to stop his football pursuits and return to his music lessons to prepare to leave for Tanglewood, a prestigious music academy. He then proceeds to invite Tom to a dinner party he and Lowenstein are hosting later that night.

While attending the party, Herbert begins ridiculing Tom for being a “Southern coach with a mad sister”, which infuriates Lowenstein. Tom then leaves the party and she goes with him.

Tom spends a romantic weekend with Lowenstein at her country house. Savannah recovers and is released from the hospital. This recovery is due to finally learning about things she has repressed from her childhood, most notably the rapes. Her first suicide attempt at age 13 was after the rapes and killings of the three convicts.

Tom then receives a call from his wife, who wants him back. He loves both Lowenstein and his wife, and he tells Lowenstein that he doesn't love his wife more, "just longer.” Tom ends his relationship with Lowenstein and reunites with his wife and family but wishes that two lives could be given to each man and woman.

After working out the traumatic events in his past with Lowenstein's help, Tom is happy in his renewed life.

== Cast ==
- Nick Nolte as Tom Wingo
- Barbra Streisand as Dr. Susan Lowenstein
- Blythe Danner as Sallie Wingo
- Kate Nelligan as Lila Wingo Newbury
- Jeroen Krabbé as Herbert Woodruff
- Melinda Dillon as Savannah Wingo
- George Carlin as Eddie Detreville
- Jason Gould as Bernard Woodruff
- Brad Sullivan as Henry Wingo

== Production ==
Pat Conroy gave Streisand a copy of his novel The Prince of Tides with the inscription: "To Barbra Streisand: The Queen of Tides...you are many things, Barbra, but you're also a great teacher...one of the greatest to come into my life. I honor the great teachers and they live in my work and they dance invisibly in the margins of my prose. You've honored me by taking care of it with such great seriousness and love. Great thanks, and I'll never forget that you gave 'The Prince of Tides' back to me as a gift."

Jay Presson Allen was reportedly paid $500,000 to $750,000 to draft a screenplay.

Principal photography began in June 1990 in Beaufort, South Carolina. Other locations in the South Carolina Lowcountry included St. Helena Island and Fripp Island. The Prince of Tides wrapped production in New York in September 1990.

== Reception ==
=== Critical reception ===
Roger Ebert gave the film 3 1/2 stars out of 4, praising Streisand's directing. Ebert wrote, "By directing one good film, you prove that you had a movie inside of you. By directing two, you prove you are a real director". He called the film "an assured and very serious love story that allows neither humor nor romance to get in the way of its deeper and darker subject", adding that "Streisand shows herself as a director who likes emotional stories - but doesn't simplify them, and pays attention to the human quirks and strangeness of her characters".

Variety wrote: "A deeply moving exploration of the tangled emotions of a dysfunctional Southern family, this lovingly crafted (though unevenly scripted) film of Pat Conroy's novel centers on Nick Nolte's performance of a lifetime. Bringing her usual strengths of character to her role as Nolte's psychiatrist/lover, Barbra Streisand marks every frame with the intensity and care of a filmmaker committed to heartfelt, unashamed emotional involvement with her characters".

Jonathan Rosenbaum of the Chicago Reader wrote: "The results may seem overripe and dated in spots, but (Streisand) coaxes a fine performance out of Nolte, and the other actors (herself included) acquit themselves honorably".

As of May 2024, The Prince of Tides held a rating of 69% on Rotten Tomatoes based on 35 reviews. The site's consensus stated: "Although the central romance arguably suffocates the heart of the drama, a moving performance by Nick Nolte and Barbra Streisand's deft direction give The Prince of Tides a soulful edge."

=== Box office ===
The Prince of Tides was a critical and box office success, opening at number four at the US box office with a weekend gross of $10,035,412, behind Hook, Beauty and the Beast, and Father of the Bride. It remained in the top 10 for seven weeks. Eventually the film grossed $74,787,599 in the United States and Canada with $61 million made overseas, for a worldwide total of $135 million. The film was among the top 20 highest-grossing movies of the year at the box office.

=== Awards and nominations ===
Although the film, its cast, and its crew received many nominations for Academy Awards, Best Director was not among these, while Best Picture was. At the following year's Oscar ceremonies, host Billy Crystal sang, to the tune of "Don't Rain on My Parade", "Did this film direct itself?" The following year, when A Few Good Men joined The Prince of Tides and the previous year's Awakenings in being nominated for the latter award, but not the former, Columbia Pictures president Mark Canton issued a statement, "This is unfortunately the third year in a row that Columbia has had a film nominated for Best Picture that seemingly directed itself."

Award	Category	Nominee(s)	Result
Academy Awards	Best Picture	Barbra Streisand and Andrew S. Karsch	Nominated
Academy Awards	Best Actor	Nick Nolte	Nominated
Academy Awards	Best Supporting Actress	Kate Nelligan	Nominated
Academy Awards	Best Screenplay – Based on Material Previously Produced or Published	Pat Conroy and Becky Johnston	Nominated
Academy Awards	Best Art Direction	Paul Sylbert and Caryl Heller	Nominated
Academy Awards	Best Cinematography	Stephen Goldblatt	Nominated
Academy Awards	Best Original Score	James Newton Howard	Nominated
American Society of Cinematographers Awards	Outstanding Achievement in Cinematography in Theatrical Releases	Stephen Goldblatt	Nominated
Boston Society of Film Critics Awards	Best Actor	Nick Nolte	Won
Chicago Film Critics Association Awards	Best Actor	Nick Nolte	Nominated
Dallas–Fort Worth Film Critics Association Awards	Best Film		Nominated
Directors Guild of America Awards	Outstanding Directorial Achievement in Motion Pictures	Barbra Streisand	Nominated
Golden Globe Awards	Best Motion Picture – Drama		Nominated
Golden Globe Awards	Best Actor in a Motion Picture – Drama	Nick Nolte	Won
Golden Globe Awards	Best Director – Motion Picture	Barbra Streisand	Nominated
Los Angeles Film Critics Association Awards	Best Actor	Nick Nolte	Won
National Society of Film Critics Awards	Best Actor	Nick Nolte	3rd Place
New York Film Critics Circle Awards	Best Actor	Nick Nolte	Runner-up
New York Film Critics Circle Awards	Best Supporting Actress	Kate Nelligan	Runner-up
USC Scripter Awards		Pat Conroy and Becky Johnston	Nominated
Writers Guild of America Awards	Best Screenplay – Based on Material Previously Produced or Published	Pat Conroy and Becky Johnston	Nominated

== Differences from novel ==
While the film was a box office hit and raised Streisand's reputation as a director, its numerous changes from the original novel upset some Conroy purists. Conroy and Johnston eliminated most of the novel's flashback scenes. They describe Tom Wingo's relationship with his siblings in great detail. In the novel, these flashbacks form the main plot and take up more of the novel than the romance between Streisand's character, Dr. Lowenstein, and Tom Wingo. The removal of the flashbacks makes the relationship between Wingo and Lowenstein the central story in the film, whereas in the novel, it is not.

Another character in the novel – the second Wingo brother, Luke, who appears only in flashbacks onscreen – is vitally important to the novel, and his death is a major plot point. In fact, the title of the book derives from a poem written by Savannah about Luke and his struggle against the government after the seizure of Colleton. In the film, The Prince of Tides is the title of a book of poetry written by Savannah and dedicated to Tom. Luke only appears intermittently, and his death is only vaguely described.

== Soundtrack ==
Streisand initially hired English composer John Barry to write a score for the film, but Barry eventually left due to creative differences. In a March 7, 1996, Cinemusic conference interview, Barry explained his exodus from the film, stating, "I was asked by Barbra Streisand to do The Prince of Tides – I live in New York, she lives in Los Angeles – and I went and met with her, and she showed me some footage, and she said, 'Why aren't you moving to Los Angeles?' and I said, 'Absolutely not.' And she said, 'Well, I like to know what's going on' – Barbra's an extreme case, by the way – and I said, 'Even if I did move to Los Angeles, I have no desire to meet with you once I know what I'm going to do. I can't work with someone over my shoulder, absolutely no way.'" Barry later retitled his theme for The Prince of Tides "Moviola" and it was released on his 1992 movie theme album of the same name. The theme also appeared in Barry's 1995 score for the 3D IMAX film Across the Sea of Time, retitled "Flight Over New York".

The final film score was composed by James Newton Howard and released November 12, 1991. It was well received by critics and garnered Howard his first Academy Award nomination for Best Original Score, though it lost to Alan Menken's music for Beauty and the Beast. The soundtrack contains two songs by Streisand, although they did not appear in the film (one of those songs, "Places That Belong to You", was at one point intended for the film's end credits, but replaced with new music by Howard in the released version). The film also includes songs and music that do not appear on any soundtracks.

== Cultural impact ==
- In the 1993 episode of The Simpsons, "Selma's Choice", Marge's childhood flashbacks are similar to this, then Marge says "Wait a minute, that was Prince of Tides". In the 1994 episode, "Fear of Flying", Marge mistakenly thinks her psychiatrist is called Lowenstein.
- In The Office online webisode series "The Accountants", Oscar reveals he was going to watch The Prince of Tides with friends. "We don't like it, we make fun of it. It's like our Rocky Horror Picture thing we do."
- In The Sopranos season 5 premiere, "Two Tonys", Tony and Valentina watch The Prince of Tides. Tony is drawn to Nolte's portrayal of a manly man with a sensitive side.
- In the Atlanta season 2 episode "Sportin' Waves", Tracy refers to himself (in jest) as the "prince of tides".
- In Ted Lasso season 2, episode 2, Sharon's favorite book is revealed to be The Prince of Tides.

== Television series ==
In May 2022, it was reported that a television series adaptation of the film was in early development for Apple TV+. The project will be produced by Sony Pictures Television, with Tate Taylor writing and executive producing. There has been no further information since then.
