= The Great Santini =

1979 film by Lewis John Carlino

- Theatrical release poster
- Directed by: Lewis John Carlino
- Screenplay by: Lewis John Carlino
- Based on: The Great Santini; 1976 novel by Pat Conroy
- Produced by: Charles A. Pratt
- Starring: Robert Duvall; Blythe Danner; Michael O'Keefe; Stan Shaw
- Cinematography: Ralph Woolsey
- Edited by: Houseley Stevenson Jr.
- Music by: Elmer Bernstein
- Production companies: Orion Pictures; Bing Crosby Productions
- Distributed by: Warner Bros.
- Release date: October 26, 1979
- Running time: 115 minutes
- Country: United States
- Language: English
- Budget: $4 million
- Box office: $4.7 million

The Great Santini is a 1979 American drama film written and directed by Lewis John Carlino. It is based on the 1976 novel by Pat Conroy about an overbearing US Marine Corps pilot and his family. The film stars Robert Duvall, Blythe Danner, and Michael O'Keefe.

The film was not a financial success, but earned critical praise and several major film industry nominations.

== Plot ==
A warrior without a war, Lt. Col. Wilbur "Bull" Meechum, a pilot known as "the Great Santini" to his fellow Marines, sets off with his reluctant family at 3 a.m., moving to the military base town of Beaufort, South Carolina, in peacetime 1962. His wife, Lillian, is loyal and docile, tolerant of Meechum's temper and drinking. Their teenage children, Ben and Mary Anne, are accustomed to his stern discipline and behave accordingly while adapting to their new town and school.

Ben's talent at basketball earned him a spot on the school team, and he became a dominant player on the court. During one-on-one games with Meechum at home, though, his father refuses to let Ben win, using unnecessarily rough physical tactics and humiliating insults and criticizing the rest of the family when they try to interfere. When Ben finally wins a game, Meechum unleashes a torrent of verbal abuse while bouncing the ball off his head. Later that night, Ben finds his father practicing basketball alone in the driveway in the pouring rain. Lillian urges Ben not to be angry at his father and explains that Meechum is showing Ben that he will have to work to compete with his son now. During a school game, Meechum orders Ben to strike back against a rival player who has committed a foul. Ben tackles the player and breaks his arm, getting himself ejected from the game and dismissed from the team.

Ben is befriended by a young black man, Toomer Smalls, whose mother Arrabelle is the family housekeeper. After Toomer uses his dogs to defend himself from a local racist who comes to attack him at home, he is shot. Ben defies his father's orders to wait for more help and follows Arrabelle's pleas to go out and help Toomer but he dies by the time Meechum confronts them on the road. Ben stands his ground, and Meechum backs down. His CO later tells Meechum he should be proud of his son, because helping Toomer showed the moral courage that Marines strive for.

After seeing Ben and Mary Anne off to the prom together, and insisting on splurging on "the best" dress, Meechum goes out on a routine mission. His engines fail, and he chooses to crash his plane into the sea rather than eject and let the aircraft crash into the nearby town. The family leaves Beaufort after his funeral at 3:00 a.m. just as they had before, with Ben at the wheel.

== Cast ==
- Robert Duvall as Lieutenant Colonel Wilbur "Bull" P. Meechum
- Blythe Danner as Lillian "Lil" Meechum
- Michael O'Keefe as Ben Meechum
- Stan Shaw as Toomer Smalls
- Brian Andrews as Matthew Meechum
- Paul Gleason as First Lieutenant Sammy
- Julie Anne Haddock as Karen Meechum
- David Keith as "Red" Pettus
- Paul Mantee as Colonel Virgil "Virg" Hedgepath
- Theresa Merritt as Arrabelle Smalls
- Lisa Jane Persky as Mary Anne Meechum
- Michael Strong as Colonel Varney

== Production notes ==
Lewis John Carlino adapted the script from Conroy's novel. Carlino also directed the film. The title character, Lt. Col. Wilbur "Bull" Meechum, aka "The Great Santini", was based on Conroy's father.

The story, for the most part, follows the book. The movie's major divergence is the absence of Ben Meechum's Jewish best friend, Sammy. The spelling of the family's surname was also changed from Meecham to Meechum. Also changed is Meechum's aircraft; in the book, he flies and commands a squadron of F-8 Crusaders, while in the film, the fighters shown are F-4 Phantom IIs.

The film's producer, Charles A. Pratt, sought the use of military equipment from the U.S. Marine Corps. He wrote a letter telling the U.S. Marine Corps that "I want to assure you that Bing Crosby Productions expects to make a movie which will be a credit to the Corps and boost recruiting of the right sort of men". A copy of the script followed. The military was unhappy with it and asked that the script be changed. The studio agreed to the request.

The film was shot in a 1.85:1 aspect ratio but was only produced in that ratio in the LaserDisc format. The VHS and DVD releases are in 1.33:1, also known as full screen or pan and scan. To date the film has not had a release in the Blu-ray format.

=== Herman Raucher misattribution ===
Herman Raucher has been mistakenly credited as a ghostwriter for the film. However, Raucher did no work on the film. The misconception arises from the fact that, in the 1980s, Raucher was hired to write a television pilot based on the movie. He only wrote "a couple of pieces," he explained.

Raucher has said that he continued to receive fan mail for Santini into the 2000s, and that the volume of letters he received was surpassed only by the correspondence for Summer of '42.

== Release ==
Warner Bros. executives were concerned that the film's plot and lack of bankable actors would make it challenging to market. It premiered in Beaufort in August 1979 and was soon released to empty cinemas in North Carolina and South Carolina. Believing the film's title, which implied it was about circus stunts, was the problem, executives tested it with other titles and locations: Sons and Heroes in Fort Wayne, Indiana; Reaching Out in Rockford, Illinois; and The Ace in Peoria, Illinois. Because it tested better in Peoria, The Ace stuck, but even with its new title, the film performed poorly. Orion Pictures pulled it and sold cable rights to HBO and airline rights to recoup its losses.

Producer Charles A. Pratt still believed in the film and raised enough money (some from Orion) to release The Great Santini in New York City under its original title. It received positive reviews, and business was steady. Two weeks later, it debuted on HBO, and audiences stopped coming. Orion executive Mike Medavoy blamed the film's box-office failure on a lack of a traditional release, which would have meant screening it first in New York and relying on expanding markets due to word-of-mouth.

=== Critical reception ===
The film is well received by critics. On Rotten Tomatoes, it has a 95% rating based on 20 reviews, with an average rating of 8/10. Roger Ebert of the Chicago Sun-Times writes: "Like almost all my favorite films, The Great Santini is about people more than it is about a story. It's a study of several characters, most unforgettably the Great Santini himself, played by Robert Duvall... There are moments so unpredictable and yet so natural they feel just like the spontaneity of life itself." John Simon of National Review writes that The Great Santini is "an uneven achievement that nevertheless contains enough of value to justify catching it".

=== Accolades ===
Award	Category	Nominee	Result	Ref.
Academy Awards	Best Actor	Robert Duvall	Nominated	
Academy Awards	Best Supporting Actor	Michael O'Keefe	Nominated	
Golden Globe Awards	New Star of the Year – Actor	Michael O'Keefe	Nominated	
Kansas City Film Critics Circle Awards	Best Actor	Robert Duvall	Won	
Montreal World Film Festival	Best Actor	Robert Duvall	Won	
National Board of Review Awards	Top Ten Films		6th Place	
National Society of Film Critics Awards	Best Actor	Robert Duvall	3rd Place	
New York Film Critics Circle Awards	Best Actor	Robert Duvall	Runner-up	
Writers Guild of America Awards	Best Drama – Adapted from Another Medium	Lewis John Carlino	Nominated	

== In popular culture ==
Movies and television have referred to the one-on-one basketball game from The Great Santini during which Bull Meechum repeatedly bounces the ball off Ben's head while asking, "You gonna cry?" Parodies of the scene appear in Austin Powers: The Spy Who Shagged Me and in episodes of The Simpsons and Roseanne. This movie was referred to in season 2 of the television series King of the Hill in the 17th episode "Hank's Dirty Laundry", where Hank mentions that he had rented and returned this movie 23 times.

The scene is invoked in the father–son tetherball match in Kicking & Screaming, a comedy in which Robert Duvall plays a tough-love father reminiscent of Bull Meechum. Another reference appears in Daddy's Home 2 in a scene featuring Mel Gibson and Mark Wahlberg.

== See also ==
- List of basketball films
