= Becky Johnston =

American screenwriter

- Born: South Haven, Michigan, U.S.
- Education: Interlochen Center for the Arts
- Occupations: Screenwriter; director
- Years active: 1978–present

Becky Johnston (born in South Haven, Michigan) is an American screenwriter and No Wave filmmaker.

== Early life ==
Johnston attended public school in South Haven, Michigan but graduated from the Interlochen Center for the Arts in Interlochen, Michigan in 1973.

== Film ==
Flyer for Sleepless Nights screening at the Mudd Club (1980)

Johnston was a No Wave Cinema (aka New Cinema) co-founder as part of Collaborative Projects in New York City in the late-1970s. Her most noted No Wave film from the post-punk era is her 49 minute Super 8 film Sleepless Nights (1979), written by Johnston and Gary Indiana, starring René Ricard, John Lurie, Eric Mitchell and Maripol. Music was by John Lurie and Evan Lurie. In 2018, it was screened at MoMA where Johnston described her film as an East Village reinvention of the Otto Preminger movie Laura that plays fast and loose with the film noir detective genre.

She lived in the Los Altos Apartments in Los Angeles while working on Under the Cherry Moon and The Prince of Tides.

She appeared on film in the Jean-Michel Basquiat documentary Jean-Michel Basquiat: The Radiant Child (2010), directed by Tamra Davis.

== Writing credits ==
- Under the Cherry Moon (1986)
- The Prince of Tides (1991)
- Damascus (1993) (Also director)
- Seven Years in Tibet (1997)
- Arthur Newman (2012) (Also producer)
- House of Gucci (2021)

== Awards and nominations ==
Johnston received Best Adapted Screenplay nominations at the Academy Awards and the WGA Awards for The Prince of Tides, having previously received a Razzie nomination for Worst Screenplay for Under the Cherry Moon.
