= The Prince of Tides (novel) =

1986 novel by Pat Conroy

- Cover of the first edition
- Author: Pat Conroy
- Language: English
- Publisher: Houghton Mifflin
- Publication date: 1986
- Publication place: United States
- Media type: Print
- Pages: 568
- ISBN: 0-395-35300-9
- Dewey Decimal: 81
- Preceded by: The Lords of Discipline
- Followed by: Beach Music

The Prince of Tides is a novel by Pat Conroy, first published in 1986. It revolves around traumatic events that affected former football player Tom Wingo's relationship with his immediate family. As Tom grapples with his twin sister's attempted suicide and the absence of his charismatic older brother Luke, the story outlines life in the American South and the events that threaten to tear Tom's family apart. The novel was adapted into a 1991 American film of the same name.

== Plot ==
Tom Wingo is a middle-aged man with a wife and three young daughters who has recently lost his job as a high school English teacher and football coach. He learns that his twin sister, Savannah, has attempted suicide yet again. Starting in her childhood, Savannah experienced visual and aural hallucinations involving bloody figures and dogs which tell her to kill herself. Savannah moves to New York City and becomes an emerging writer of poetry, writing about her past as a way to escape from it. After many years, Savannah attempts suicide and nearly dies, the hallucinations still haunting her. Tom agrees to go to New York to look after his sister until she is well again. Before he leaves his home in South Carolina, he learns that Sallie, his wife, is having an affair. He is not completely surprised as he has not been very affectionate toward her.

In New York, Tom stays at Savannah’s apartment, as she is in the hospital. He meets with her psychiatrist, Susan Lowenstein, and agrees to stay in the city until he has filled Susan in on the dysfunctional childhood he and Savannah shared. Susan does not think it is a good idea for Tom to visit Savannah for a while since contact with any of her family greatly disturbs her.

Susan and Tom grow close during all the time they spend together talking about Savannah. They are very different people: Susan is a wealthy Jewish psychiatrist who lives in New York City and Tom is a Catholic teacher who grew up poor in rural Colleton County, South Carolina. They often butt heads, but they develop a relationship of mutual comfort and respect. Susan tells Tom about her shaky marriage to Herbert Woodruff, a famous concert violinist, and her husband’s affair with another woman. Tom and Susan spend a lot of time together socially as well as professionally. He also agrees to coach Susan’s difficult teenage son, Bernard, in football.

Tom recounts his sad and horrific childhood for Susan in hopes that it might help her save Savannah. We learn that Tom and his siblings, twin sister Savannah and their elder brother, Luke, were the offspring of an abusive father and uncaring mother. Their father, Henry, a WWII bomber crewman who survived being shot down and managed to evade capture by the Nazis, thought that the best way to raise a family was by beating them, and did so regularly. He was a shrimp boat operator and, despite being successful at that profession, spent all of his money on frivolous business pursuits. One business attempt was a gas station that he advertised with a live tiger, which became the family pet, Caesar. These attempts leave the family in poverty. Their overly proud, status-hungry mother, Lila, was only concerned about the family's public image and would not let her children say a word about their father's abuse.

Eventually, Tom reveals the most traumatic event of their childhood, which ultimately caused the first of several of Savannah's suicide attempts. A man the children nickname "Callanwolde,” whom they first encounter in the woods next to their grandmother's home in Atlanta, later escapes from prison with two other men and goes to the Wingo home on Melrose Island, South Carolina when the twins were 18. They rape Tom, Savannah, and Lila. Luke, who was working outside, comes to the house, sees the men through the window, and releases Caesar, who kills the men raping Lila and Savannah. Meanwhile, Tom kills the man who raped him. Lila and the children dispose of the men's bodies and she makes them promise that they will never tell a soul about what happened.

After the revelation of the rape, Susan feels that she is even closer to helping Savannah. Tom says the worst thing that happened to their family was Luke’s death. This is the incident that caused Tom to have a nervous breakdown and lose his job. He then tells the story of how Luke died. Lila ends up divorcing Henry many years later, and marries Reese Newbury, a prominent landowner in the city of Colleton and the father of Tom's childhood rival. Lila had gained Melrose Island in the divorce settlement, and sells it to Newbury, who in turn sells it to the Atomic Energy Commission, who are beginning construction of production plants there. Luke, an ex-Navy SEAL who served in Vietnam, decides to fight for his land and the city by using guerrilla tactics to destroy bridges and building equipment, leading him to become a wanted man. An FBI agent approaches Tom and asks him to offer Luke a deal of only three to five years in prison in exchange for his cease-fire. Both Savannah and Tom track down Luke, and they try to persuade him to give up instead of being killed by the FBI. Luke agrees to the deal, but on his way to the rendezvous point to surrender, he is shot and killed by a soldier who did not know about the agreement. Luke's death was the driving force behind Savannah's latest suicide attempt, and Susan and Tom figure out that in order to save Savannah, she would have to write poetry about Luke's life the way she wrote about her childhood.

Tom and Susan begin an affair, but Tom realizes that he still loves Sallie. During his time in the city, he becomes a new man. He falls in love with life again and owes much of his transformation to Susan. After saving Savannah, Tom and Susan part ways and he returns to his family in South Carolina, reconciling with Sallie. He becomes much closer to his wife and daughters as a result of his time in New York. Susan ends up divorcing Herbert and is now dating a lawyer. Meanwhile, Savannah recovers from her suicide attempt, and she and Tom become closer to each other. Henry, after being released from prison for drug trafficking, is confronted by Tom about his abuse. He claims to not remember ever hurting his family. Although Savannah and Tom can never completely forgive Henry for the damage that he did, they look forward to getting to know their father better, who acts like a changed man. Despite an earlier apologetic conversation between Lila and Tom, he and Savannah have not completely repaired their relationship with their mother. At the novel’s conclusion, it appears that despite all that has happened, everyone will be all right.

== Characters ==
=== Major characters ===
- Tom Wingo: The main character and protagonist of the novel. Tom has recently been fired from his position as a coach and a teacher. He spends a summer in New York City with Dr. Lowenstein, his sister's psychiatrist, trying to help her understand his and his sister's childhood with the hope of saving Savannah (his sister) from herself. In the meantime, Tom tries to make himself a better person and figure out how his life has gotten so off track.
- Dr. Susan Lowenstein: Savannah's psychiatrist. She is a beautiful Jewish woman, who despite her seemingly fabulous life, is very unhappy.
- Luke Wingo: The oldest of the Wingo siblings. He is brave and true, as well as the protector of those he loves. He loves nothing more than Colleton.
- Savannah Wingo: Tom's twin sister. The most sensitive of the family, she is deeply hurt by the events of their childhood and manifests her pain through delusions. She is a poet and revels in the anonymity of New York City.

=== Minor characters ===
- Henry Wingo: Tom's, Savannah's, and Luke's father. He is a shrimper and a brutal, thoughtless man. He is a tyrant over his family, and he beats his wife and children. Yet, at times, Henry can also be a dreamer and almost sweet. In his old age, he is pathetic.
- Lila Wingo-Newbury: Tom's, Savannah's, and Luke's mother. She is very beautiful and believes that she is above her social position. She is constantly trying to befriend the women of society. Lila believes that she could have been the first lady if only she had met the right man.
- Sallie Wingo: Tom's wife. They met in college and she is now a doctor. Sallie has recently informed Tom that she is having an affair with another doctor. She feels like Tom does not appreciate her because he does not express his emotions.
- Jennifer Wingo: Tom and Sallie's oldest daughter, age ten. She is Lila's favorite grandchild because Isabel Newbury was on the same floor in the hospital as Jennifer and Sallie when Jennifer was born. Because of this good fortune, Lila was able to wile her way into elite society.
- Lucy Wingo: Tom and Sallie's second daughter, age nine. She wants to be a poet like her aunt Savannah.
- Chandler Wingo: Tom and Sallie's youngest daughter, age seven.
- Amos Wingo: A bible salesman and barber, Henry's father and Tom's, Savannah's, and Luke's grandfather. Amos is an incredibly good and religious man. When his wife leaves him during the Depression, he never looks at another woman. Many years later, he takes his wife back with no questions.
- Tolitha Wingo: Henry's mother and Tom's, Savannah's, and Luke's grandmother. Tolitha is a good-natured free spirit, and is Savannah's mentor. She leaves Henry and her husband, Amos, during the Depression. She moves to Atlanta and marries another man, John. John never knows of her husband or son and she lives with him until he dies. When John dies, Tolitha spends all of her money on a three-year cruise around the world, during which she marries a few more times. When she runs out of money, she goes back to Amos and they live together until his death.
- Papa John: Tolitha's second husband. When the Wingos stay with Tolitha and Papa John while Henry is in Korea, the children are not allowed to tell him that Tolitha is their grandmother. Papa John is wonderful with the children and a good man. He sells shoes and raises spiders as a hobby.
- Dr. Jack Cleveland: The man with whom Sallie is having an affair.
- Eddie Detreville: Savannah's neighbor who is homosexual.
- Sara Jenkins: The ex-slave midwife who delivered Savannah and Tom (as well as almost everyone else in Colleton). She gives her life protecting the children.
- Günter Kraus: The German priest who hid Henry from the Nazis.
- Bernard Woodruff: Susan's teenage son. Tom coaches him in football, but stops when Bernard's father sends him to music camp. Bernard has a chip on his shoulder but responds well to Tom.
- Herbert Woodruff: Susan's husband, who is a world-class violinist. He is cruel to his wife and son. He cheats on Susan with a fellow musician (a flautist) and humiliates her in front of others.
- Isabel Newbury: A snobby, rich woman who is at the center of high society in Colleton. She is cruel to the Wingo family. Lila takes care of her as she is dying.
- Reese Newbury: Reese is the richest man in Colleton. He manipulates his son and is mean to Tom. Lila marries him after Isabel, his wife, dies and after Lila divorces Henry.
- Todd Newbury: Isabel and Reese's son, who was mean to Tom during their childhood.
- Winthrop Olgetree: The funeral director in Colleton.
- Mr. Fruit: An older man who seems to be mentally handicapped, but a lovable man. He leads parades and directs traffic at his own whim on the Street of Tides.
- J. William Covington: The FBI agent who makes a deal for Luke.

== Reception and cultural influence ==
The Prince of Tides was acclaimed by critics and became a best seller. In 1991, a film version, with Nick Nolte as Tom, Melinda Dillon as Savannah, Kate Nelligan as their mother, and Barbra Streisand (who also directed and produced) as Lowenstein, was released. Although not as critically acclaimed as the novel, the movie was a box-office hit and was nominated for several Academy Awards, including Best Picture.

Both the film and the novel have inspired or been referenced in other creative works. Jimmy Buffett and Michael Utley wrote a song titled "Prince of Tides" for Buffett's 16th studio album "Hot Water", released in June 1988. The song retells the story of the book, and starts and finishes with Jimmy Buffett reading passages from the book. The song is dedicated: "Pat Conroy, Doc Pomus and the people of Daufuskie Island have already said it all. I am thankful for such inspiration." In the television comedy series Ted Lasso (season 2, episode 2), sports psychologist Dr. Sharon Fieldstone calls The Prince of Tides her favorite book.
