= The Great Santini (novel) =

1976 novel by Pat Conroy

- First edition
- Author: Pat Conroy
- Cover artist: George Hall
- Language: English
- Genre: Semi-autobiographical
- Published: 1976 Random House
- Publication place: United States
- Media type: Print (hardback and paperback)
- Pages: 536
- ISBN: 0-395-24297-5
- OCLC: 49408583
- LC Class: PS3553.O5198 G74 2006
- Preceded by: The Water is Wide
- Followed by: The Lords of Discipline

The Great Santini is a novel written by Pat Conroy and published in 1976.

== Plot summary ==
Hard-nosed Marine fighter pilot Lt. Col. Wilbur "Bull" Meecham calls himself "The Great Santini." He runs his family with a strict hand. In 1962, before the Vietnam War, the Meecham family struggles to fit into the Marine town of Ravenel, South Carolina (closely based on Beaufort, South Carolina) where they are newcomers. Conroy makes the point that Santini is a warrior without a war, and in turn is at war alternately with the service that he loves and his family.

The novel explores main character Ben Meecham's growth into manhood, his experiences playing basketball for his high school, as well as his friendships with a Jewish classmate and an African-American farmer. The novel exposes the love-hate relationship between Ben and his father, and the lengths Ben goes to in an effort to win his father's acceptance and love.

This book is based on the life experiences of Donald Conroy (Meecham) and his son Pat Conroy (Ben).

== Film adaptation ==
The novel was made into a film of the same name in 1979, starring Robert Duvall in the title role.

== Background ==
- "The Great Santini," called the "World's Champion Flame-Diver," appeared as a circus act in the 1931 film Side Show.
