= Pat Conroy =

American novelist (1945–2016)

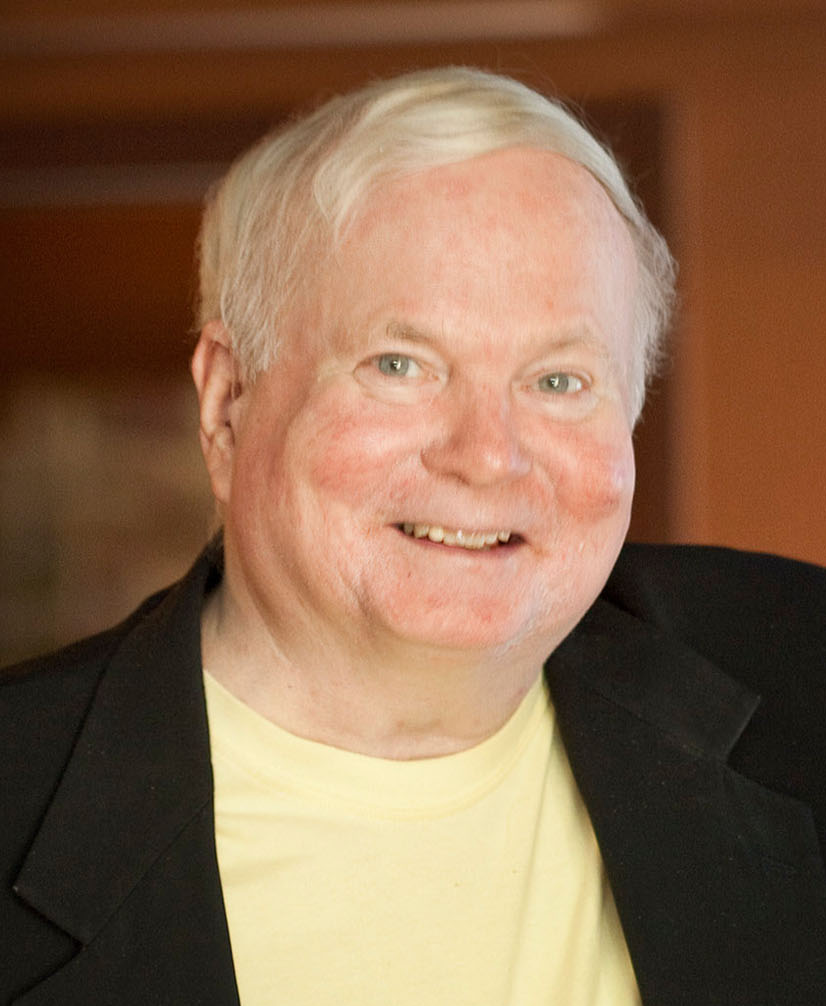
- Conroy in 2013
- Born: Donald Patrick Conroy; October 26, 1945; Atlanta, Georgia, U.S.
- Died: March 4, 2016 (aged 70); Beaufort, South Carolina, U.S.
- Occupation: Novelist
- Spouse: Cassandra King
- Writing career
- Period: 1970–2016
- Genres: Literary fiction; nonfiction
- Website: patconroy.com

Signature
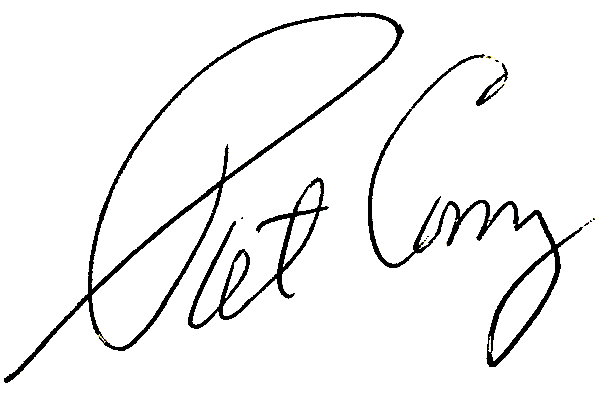

Donald Patrick Conroy (October 26, 1945 – March 4, 2016) was an American author who wrote several acclaimed novels and memoirs; his books The Water Is Wide, The Lords of Discipline, The Prince of Tides and The Great Santini were made into films, the last two being nominated for Oscars. He is recognized as a leading figure of late-20th-century American Southern literature.

== Early life ==
Born in Atlanta, Georgia, Patrick "Pat" Conroy was the eldest of seven children (five boys and two girls) born to Marine Colonel Donald Conroy, of Chicago, Illinois, and the former Frances "Peggy" Peek of Alabama. His father was a Marine Corps fighter pilot, and Conroy moved often in his youth, attending 11 schools by the time he was 15. He did not have a hometown until his family settled in Beaufort, South Carolina, where he finished high school. During his senior year in high school, he was a protégé of Ann Head who was an influence on his future writing. His alma mater is The Citadel, The Military College of South Carolina in Charleston, where he graduated from the Corps of Cadets as an English major.

Conroy had said his stories were heavily influenced by his military brat upbringing, and in particular, difficulties experienced with his own father, a US Marine Corps pilot, who was physically and emotionally abusive toward his children. The pain of a youth growing up in a harsh environment is evident in Conroy's novels, which use autobiographical material, particularly The Great Santini and The Prince of Tides. While living in Orlando, Florida, Conroy's fifth-grade basketball team defeated a team of sixth graders, making the sport his prime outlet for bottled-up emotions for more than a dozen years. Conroy also cites his family's frequent military-related moves and growing up immersed in military culture as significant influences in his life (in both positive and negative ways).

A standout athlete, he was recruited to The Citadel to play basketball; his 2002 book My Losing Season focused on his experiences playing his senior year, and like The Lords of Discipline, also served as a retrospective of his cadet years.

== Writing career ==
As a graduate of The Citadel's Corps of Cadets, his experiences at The Citadel provided the basis for two of his best-known works, the novel The Lords of Discipline and the memoir My Losing Season. The latter details his senior year on the school's underdog basketball team, which won the longest game in the history of Southern Conference basketball against rival Virginia Military Institute in quadruple overtime in 1967.

His first book, The Boo, is a collection of anecdotes about cadet life centering on Lt. Colonel Thomas Nugent Courvoisie, who had served as Assistant Commandant of Cadets at The Citadel from 1961 to 1968; Courvoisie was the inspiration for the fictional character Colonel Thomas Berrineau, a.k.a. "The Bear", in The Lords Of Discipline. Conroy began the book in 1968, after learning that Lt. Colonel Courvoisie had been removed from his position as assistant commandant and given a job in the warehouse; he paid to self-publish the book, borrowing the money from a bank.

After graduating from The Citadel, Conroy taught English in Beaufort, South Carolina; while there he met and married Barbara Jones, a young widow of the Vietnam War who was pregnant with her second child. He then accepted a job teaching children in a one-room schoolhouse on remote Daufuskie Island, South Carolina.

Conroy was fired at the conclusion of his first year on the island for his unconventional teaching practices, including his refusal to use corporal punishment on students, and for his lack of respect for the school's administration. He later wrote The Water Is Wide based on his experiences as a teacher. The book won Conroy a humanitarian award from the National Education Association and an Anisfield-Wolf Book Award. It was also made into a feature film, Conrack, starring Jon Voight in 1974. Hallmark produced a television version of the book in 2006.

In 1976, Conroy published his novel, The Great Santini. The main character of the novel is Marine fighter pilot Colonel "Bull" Meecham, who dominates and terrorizes his family. Bull Meecham also psychologically abuses his teenage son Ben. The character is based on Conroy's father Donald. (According to My Losing Season, Donald Conroy was even worse than the character depicted in Santini.)

The Great Santini caused friction within the Conroy family, who felt that he had betrayed family secrets by writing about his father. According to Conroy, members of his mother's family would picket his book signings, passing out pamphlets asking people not to buy the novel. However, the book also eventually helped repair Conroy's relationship with his father, and they became very close. His father, looking to prove that he was not like the character in the book, changed his behavior drastically.

According to Conroy, his father would often sign copies of his son's novels, "I hope you enjoy my son's latest work of fiction." He would underline the word "fiction" five or six times. "That boy of mine sure has a vivid imagination. Ol' lovable, likable Col. Don Conroy, USMC (Ret.), the Great Santini." The novel was made into a film of the same name in 1979, starring Robert Duvall.

Publication of The Lords of Discipline in 1980 upset many of his fellow graduates of The Citadel, who felt that his portrayal of campus life was highly unflattering. The novel was adapted for the screenplay of a 1983 film of the same name, starring David Keith as Will McLean and Robert Prosky as Colonel "Bear" Berrineau. The rift was not healed until 2000, when Conroy was awarded an honorary degree and asked to deliver the commencement address the following year.

In 1986, Conroy published The Prince of Tides about Tom Wingo, an unemployed South Carolina teacher who goes to New York City to help his sister, Savannah, a poet who has attempted suicide, to come to terms with their past. The novel was made into a film of the same name in 1991. Directed by Barbra Streisand, the film was nominated for seven Academy Awards, including Best Picture.

In 1995, Conroy published Beach Music, a novel about an American expatriate living in Rome who returns to South Carolina upon news of his mother's terminal illness. The story reveals his attempt to confront personal demons, including the suicide of his wife, the subsequent custody battle with his in-laws over their daughter, and the attempt by a film-making friend to rekindle old friendships which were compromised during the days of the Vietnam War.

In 2002, Pat Conroy published My Losing Season where he takes the reader through his last year playing basketball, as point guard and captain of the Citadel Bulldogs. My Losing Season traces Conroy's career as basketball player, from grammar school to high school and college at the Citadel. The Pat Conroy Cookbook, published in 2004, is a collection of favorite recipes accompanied by stories about his life, including many stories of growing up in South Carolina. In 2009, Conroy published South of Broad, which again uses the familiar backdrop of Charleston following the suicide of newspaperman Leo King's brother, and alternates narratives of a diverse group of friends between 1969 and 1989.

In May 2013, Conroy was named editor-at-large of Story River Books, a newly created fiction division of the University of South Carolina Press. In October 2013, four years after being first publicized, Conroy published a memoir called The Death of Santini, which recounts the volatile relationship he shared with his father up until his father's death in 1998.

Conroy was inducted into the South Carolina Hall of Fame on March 18, 2009.

== Military brat cultural identity and awareness movement ==
Conroy was a major supporter of the research and writing efforts of journalist Mary Edwards Wertsch in her identification of the hidden subculture of American Military Brats, the children of career military families, who grow up moving constantly, deeply immersed in the military, and often personally affected by war.

=== Conroy's essay on military childhood ===
In 1991, Wertsch "launched the movement for military brat cultural identity" with her book Military Brats: Legacies of Childhood inside the Fortress. In researching her book, Wertsch identified common themes from interviews of over 80 offspring of military households, including the special challenges, strengths and also the unique subculture experienced by American "military brats". While this book does not purport to be a scientific study, subsequent research has validated many of her findings.

Conroy contributed a now widely circulated ten-page essay on American military childhood, including his own childhood, to Wertsch's book, which was used as the introduction. It included the following:

Her book speaks in a language that is clear and stinging and instantly recognizable to me [as a brat], yet it's a language I was not even aware I spoke. She isolates the military brats of America as a new indigenous subculture with our own customs, rites of passage, forms of communication, and folkways .... With this book, Mary [Wertsch] astonished me and introduced me to a secret family I did not know I had.

=== Conroy's role in Brats: Our Journey Home ===
Conroy also authorized the use of his work in the award-winning documentary Brats: Our Journey Home directed by Donna Musil, that endeavors to bring the hidden subculture of military brats into greater public awareness, as well as aiding military brat self-awareness and support.

The documentary ends with a quote of Conroy about the invisibility of the military brat subculture to the wider American society. Conroy wrote, "We spent our entire childhoods in the service of our country, and no one even knew we were there."

== Personal life ==
Conroy was married three times. His first marriage was to Barbara (née Bolling) Jones on October 10, 1969, while he was teaching on Daufuskie Island. Jones, who had been Conroy's next door neighbor in Beaufort, South Carolina, had been widowed when her first husband, Joseph Wester Jones III, a fighter pilot stationed in Vietnam, had been shot down and killed. Jones already had one daughter, Jessica, and was pregnant at the time of her husband's death with their second child, Melissa. He adopted both girls after he married their mother, and then they had a daughter of their own, Megan. They divorced in 1977.

Conroy then married Lenore (née Gurewitz) Fleischer in 1981. He became the stepfather to her two children, Gregory and Emily, and the couple also had one daughter, to whom he dedicated his 2010 book My Reading Life, "This book is dedicated to my lost daughter, Susannah Ansley Conroy. Know this: I love you with my heart and always will. Your return to my life would be one of the happiest moments I could imagine." Conroy and Fleischer divorced on October 26, 1995, Conroy's 50th birthday. Conroy married his third wife, writer Cassandra King, in May 1998. He became the stepfather to her three children, Jim, Jason and Jake.

A friend of Conroy, political cartoonist Doug Marlette, died in a car accident in July 2007. Conroy and Joe Klein eulogized Marlette at the funeral. There were 10 eulogists in all, and Conroy called Marlette his best friend, and said: "The first person to cry, when he heard about Doug's death, was God".

Conroy lived in Beaufort with wife Cassandra until his death. In 2007, he commented that she was a much happier writer than he was: "I'll hear her cackle with laughter at some funny line she's written. I've never cackled with laughter at a single line I've ever written. None of it has given me pleasure. She writes with pleasure and joy, and I sit there in gloom and darkness."

As an adult, Conroy suffered from depression, had several breakdowns and contemplated suicide. He attempted suicide in the mid-1970s while writing The Great Santini.

== Death ==
On February 15, 2016, Conroy stated on his Facebook page that he was being treated for pancreatic cancer. He died on March 4, 2016, at 70 years old. Conroy's funeral was held on March 8, 2016, at St. Peter's Catholic Church in Beaufort, South Carolina.

Pat Conroy is buried in St. Helena Memorial Gardens cemetery (Ernest Drive, Saint Helena Island 29920) near the Penn Center.

== Legacy ==
Located in Beaufort, South Carolina, the Pat Conroy Literary Center was incorporated as a non-profit 501(c)(3) organization on March 19, 2016. The center, which houses a collection of Conroy memorabilia, seeks to "continue his legacy in the magnificent coastal landscape where his storytelling began and beyond, supporting a vibrant literary community that reflects Pat Conroy’s undying delight in the power of the human voice." In 2017, the Pat Conroy Literary Center was designated a Literary Landmark by the American Library Association. The same year, it became the first site in South Carolina to be selected as an affiliate of the American Writers Museum.

The Pat Conroy Literary Center hosts a number of educational activities and cultural events, including an annual literary festival. Twice a year, published or unpublished authors of all genres can apply for the center's writer's residency, which includes a cottage for inspirational, creative space.

The author George RR Martin has praised Conroy's writing, calling him "one of [his] favorite living novelists for a long, long time," and naming The Prince of Tides "one of the greatest novels of the twentieth century" and one of his favourite books.

== Works ==
- 1970: The Boo
- 1972: The Water Is Wide
- 1976: The Great Santini
- 1980: The Lords of Discipline
- 1986: The Prince of Tides
- 1989: Unconquered (teleplay)
- 1995: Beach Music
- 2002: My Losing Season
- 2004: The Pat Conroy Cookbook: Recipes of My Life
- 2009: South of Broad
- 2010: My Reading Life
- 2013: The Death of Santini
- 2016: A Lowcountry Heart: Reflections on a Writing Life

== Awards ==
- 1973 Anisfield-Wolf Book Award
- 1974 National Education Association Humanitarian Award
- 1978 Georgia Governor's Award for the Arts & Humanities
- 1981 Southern Regional Council Lillian Smith Book Award
- 1988 South Carolina Academy of Authors Inductee
- 1991 Writers Guild of America Award Nominee, Adapted Screenplay
- 1992 Academy Award Nominee, Adapted Screenplay
- 1992 University of Southern California Scripter Award Nominee
- 1993 American Academy of Achievement Golden Plate Award
- 1995 Southern Voices Award for Distinguished Achievement
- 1995 Thomas Cooper Medal for Distinction in the Arts & Sciences
- 1996 Georgia Commission on the Holocaust Humanitarian Award
- 1997 Omicron Delta Kappa honoris causa inductee at Auburn University at Montgomery
- 1997 University of South Carolina Honorary Doctorate
- 1999 Georgia Center for the Book Stanley W. Lindberg Award
- 2000 The Citadel Honorary Doctor of Letters
- 2001 James Beard Foundation Award for Journalism, Magazine Feature Writing with Recipes
- 2002 South Carolina Order of the Palmetto
- 2003 Thomas Wolfe Prize, University of North Carolina at Chapel Hill Department of English
- 2003 Southern Independent Booksellers Alliance (SIBA) Book of the Year Award
- 2004 Georgia Writers Hall of Fame Inductee
- 2005 F. Scott Fitzgerald Award
- 2006 Southeastern Library Association Outstanding Southeastern Author Award
- 2010 South Carolina Hall of Fame Inductee
- 2010 Elizabeth O’Neill Verner Governor's Lifetime Achievement Award for the Arts
- 2014 Beaufort Regional Chamber of Commerce Palmetto Achievement Award

== Other contributions ==
- 1992: Military Brats: Legacies of Growing Up Inside the Fortress by Mary Edwards Wertsch (introduction)
- 1993: First Words: Earliest Writing from Favorite Contemporary Authors edited by Paul Mandelbaum (contributor)
- 1996: Gullah Images: The Art of Jonathan Green by Jonathan Green (foreword)
- 1998: Why I Write: Thoughts on the Craft of Fiction edited by Will Blythe (contributor)
- 2003: Gullah Home Cooking the Daufuskie Way by Sallie Ann Robinson (introduction)
- 2003: Unrooted Childhoods: Memoirs of Growing Up Global edited by Faith Eidse and Nina Sichel (contributor)
- 2007: War and Peace by Leo Tolstoy (introduction, Signet Classics edition)
- 2009: Southern Living Comfort Food: A Delicious Trip Down Memory Lane (foreword)
- 2009: Stories from the Blue Moon Café edited by Sonny Brewer (contributor)
- 2012: Mastering the Art of Southern Cooking by Nathalie Dupree (foreword)
- 2014: The Sheltering: A Novel by Mark Powell (foreword)
- 2015: A Clear View of the Southern Sky Stories by Mary Hood (foreword)
- 2015: Jacob Jump by Eric Morris (foreword)
- 2015: Lost Cantos of the Ouroboros Caves by Maggie Schein (foreword)
- 2015: Writing South Carolina Selections from the First High School Writing Contest edited by Steve Lynn with Aïda Rogers (foreword)
- 2015: Untying the Moon: A Novel by Ellen Malphrus (foreword)
- 2016: All the Governor's Men: A Mountain Brook Novel by Katherine Clark (foreword)
- 2016: The Cigar Factory: A Novel of Charleston by Michele Moore (foreword)
- 2018: Poppy's Pants by Melissa Conroy (postscript)
- 2021: Gullah Spirit: The Art of Jonathan Green by Jonathan Green (foreword)

== See also ==
- Inspirational/motivational instructors/mentors portrayed in films
- List of awards named after people
