= List of The Citadel alumni =

This is a list of notable alumni of The Citadel.

== Military ==
=== Confederate States Army ===
- Colonel Charles C. Tew (1846), first graduate of the college; served as professor and commandant of the Citadel Academy and superintendent of the Arsenal Academy; founded Hillsborough Military Academy in North Carolina; killed in action at the Battle of Antietam in 1862 on the eve of his promotion to brigadier general
- Brig. Gen. Johnson Hagood (1847), commanded Confederate forces in Charleston during the attack on Fort Wagner depicted in the movie Glory; governor of South Carolina 1880–82 and instrumental in reopening The Citadel after occupation by federal troops at the end of the Civil War; namesake of Johnson Hagood Stadium, where The Citadel plays its home football games
- Brig. Gen. Micah Jenkins (1854), first honor graduate of his class, one of the "boy generals" aged 26; a favorite of General Robert E. Lee; killed in action at the Battle of the Wilderness; namesake of Jenkins Hall, which houses the Military Sciences and Commandant's Office
- Maj. Gen. Evander M. Law (1856), fought in 13 major engagements during the Civil War; wounded four times and youngest general in Army of Northern Virginia; founded South Florida Military College, namesake of Law Barracks
- Colonel James D. Nance (1856), commanded the 3rd South Carolina Infantry Regiment during the Civil War; killed at the Battle of the Wilderness

=== United States Army ===
- Maj. Gen. Edward Fuller Witsell (1911), adjutant general of the United States Army 1947–1951
- Brig. Gen. Barnwell R. Legge CBE (1911), one of the most decorated U.S. military members of World War I; military attaché to Switzerland during World War II
- Major Thomas D. Howie (1929), immortalized during World War II as the "major of St. Lo"; leader of the battalion that captured the strategic city of Saint-Lô, France (where he was killed); inspiration for the character of Captain John Miller in Saving Private Ryan
- General William Westmoreland (1935), commander of US forces in Vietnam, chief of staff of the United States Army; father James R. (1900) served as chairman of the board of Visitors in the 1940s and son James A. graduated in 1961 (attended one year, USMA graduate)
- Lt. Col. George Bray McMillan, USAAF (1938), pilot with the Flying Tigers, squadron commander in the 51st Fighter Group, combat ace with 8.5 aerial victories; shot down and killed near Pingsang, China in June 1944
- Brig. Gen. Charles J. Girard (1938), deputy commander of the Capital Military Assistance Command in Saigon, one of the highest-ranking officers to die in the Vietnam War
- Lt. Col. Thomas Nugent Courvoisie (1938), assistant commandant of Cadets at the Citadel, subject of The Boo, the first book by novelist Pat Conroy, and the inspiration for "The Bear" in Conroy's novel The Lords of Discipline
- Lt. Gen. George M. Seignious (1942), appointed by President Johnson as military advisor to the Paris Peace Talks in 1968; commanding general, 3d Infantry Division and United States Army Berlin, dputy assistant secretary of defense, director of the Joint Staff, president of The Citadel 1974–1979. Seignious Hall, namesake of the football facility at The Citadel
- Maj. Gen. James Grimsley Jr. (1942), combat veteran of World War II and Vietnam, awarded 2 Silver Stars, former deputy assistant secretary of defense; president of The Citadel 1980–89 and president emeritus 1989–2013
- Lt. Gen. James B. Vaught (1946), commander of Operation Eagle Claw in 1980; former commanding general of ROK-US Combined Forces Command
- Lt. Gen. Donald E. Rosenblum (1951), commanding general, 1st Army and 24th Infantry Division; deputy commanding general, XVIII Airborne Corps
- Captain Hugh R. Nelson Jr. (1959), posthumously awarded the Medal of Honor on 3 January 2025 for his actions in South Vietnam on 5 June 1966
- Lt. Gen. Carmen Cavezza (1961), awarded two Silver Stars for combat service in Vietnam, served as military assistant to Secretary of Defense Caspar Weinberger; commanding general of 7th Infantry Division, US Army Infantry Center and I Corps
- General William W. Hartzog (1963), commanding general, US Army Training and Doctrine Command; commanding general of 1st Infantry Division and U.S. Army, South
- Lt. Gen. William M. Steele (1967), commanding general, U.S. Army Pacific, Combined Arms Center and 82nd Airborne Division
- Lt. Gen. John P. Costello (1969), commanding general, United States Army Space and Missile Defense Command and United States Army Air Defense Artillery School
- Maj. Gen. Kenneth Bowra (1970), deputy commander of the NATO headquarters of KFOR; Commander John F. Kennedy Special Warfare Center and School
- Lt. Gen. John Kimmons (1974), chief of staff for the director of National Intelligence, U.S. Army assistant chief of staff for Intelligence, commanding general, United States Army Intelligence and Security Command
- Lt. Gen. Daniel P. Bolger (1978), commanding general, Combined Security Transition Command-Afghanistan and commander, NATO Training Mission-Afghanistan; U.S. Army assistant chief of staff for operations and training; commanding general, 1st Cavalry Division and Joint Readiness Training Center
- Lt. Gen. Michael Ferriter (1979), commanding general, Installation Management Command/U.S. Army assistant chief of staff for Installation Management; commanding general NATO Training Mission - Iraq and United States Army Infantry Center
- Maj. Gen. Glenn K. Rieth (1980), adjutant general of New Jersey 2002–11
- Maj. Gen. Roy V. McCarty (1982), current South Carolina adjutant general
- Lt. Gen. Thomas S. James Jr. (1985), commanding general, First United States Army; commanding general, 7th Infantry Division and United States Army Armor School
- Lt. Gen. E. John Deedrick (1988), United States military representative to the NATO Military Committee
- Lt. Gen. Francis M. Beaudette (1989), commanding general United States Army Special Operations Command
- Lt. Gen. Thomas H. Todd III (1989), deputy commanding general of Acquisition and Systems at United States Army Futures Command
- Lt. Gen. Stephen G. Smith (1991), current deputy commanding general, United States Army Western Hemisphere Command
- Maj. Gen. David Wilson (1991), current commanding general, United States Army Sustainment Command; first Black alumnus to attain 2-star rank in any of the armed services and the first Black general officer alumnus on active duty in the U.S. Army
- Lt. Gen Edmond Brown (1994), deputy commanding general of United States Army Transformation and Training Command.
- SFC Christopher Celiz (2008), posthumously awarded the Medal of Honor for heroic actions in Afghanistan while assigned to the 75th Ranger Regiment in 2018 (attended 2 years)

=== United States Navy ===
- Vice Admiral Bernard L. Austin (1922), director of the Joint Staff and president of the Naval War College, 2-time winner of the Navy Cross (attended 2 years, USNA graduate)
- Rear Admiral Stephen C. Evans (1986), commander of Carrier Strike Group 2
- Rear Admiral Carey Cash (1992), 21st chaplain of the United States Marine Corps

=== United States Marine Corps ===
- Maj. Gen. Harry K. Pickett (1911), commanding officer of the Marine barracks at Pearl Harbor on December 7, 1941
- Lt. Gen. James T. Moore (1916), early Marine aviator who held important command positions in USMC aviation during World War II, famous as Pappy Boyington's boss in the South Pacific air war and featured in the 1970s TV show Baa Baa Black Sheep
- Maj. Gen. Lewie G. Merritt (1917), pioneer in Marine aviation who developed tactics of dive bombing and close air support, commanded several major flying units in World War II; namesake of Marine Corps Air Station Beaufort, South Carolina
- General William O. Brice (1921), early Marine flier who led units during World War II and Korea; commanding general, Fleet Marine Force, Pacific; assistant commandant for air and assistant chief of naval operations for marine aviation; youngest Marine Corps general in World War II, first Marine aviator four-star general
- General Edwin A. Pollock (1921), Navy Cross recipient for actions at Battle of Guadalcanal in 1942, led the 2d Marine Division during combat in Korea; commanded 1st Marine Division; only Marine to have commanded both the Pacific and Atlantic Fleet Marine Forces; instrumental in founding the Marine Military Academy in Harlingen, Texas; served as first president and commandant; chairman of The Citadel board of visitors; named chairman emeritus upon retirement
- Lt. Gen. Herbert Beckington (1943), military aide to Vice President Hubert Humphrey, assistant commandant for plans and operations
- Lt. Gen. Frank Libutti (1966), commanding general, Marine Forces Pacific, Marine Forces Korea and 1st Marine Division
- Lt. Gen. Lawrence D. Nicholson (1979), commanding general, III Marine Expeditionary Force and 1st Marine Division
- General Kenneth F. McKenzie, Jr. (1979), commander, United States Central Command; director of the Joint Staff and commanding general, United States Marine Forces Central Command
- General Glenn M. Walters (1979), 34th assistant commandant of the Marine Corps, current president of The Citadel
- Colonel Randolph Bresnik (1989), F/A-18 pilot and NASA astronaut; mission specialist on STS-129 Space Shuttle Atlantis in November 2009; commander of the International Space Station September – December, 2017

=== United States Air Force ===
- Lt. Col. Horace Ellis Crouch (1940), bombardier/navigator on crew #10 of the Doolittle Raid, also flew combat missions in China later in World War II and in Korea
- Lt. Gen. Claudius E. Watts III (1958), Fulbright Scholar and comptroller of the USAF, president of The Citadel 1989–96
- Lt. Gen. Ellie G. Shuler Jr. (1959), Commander, Strategic Air Command's Eighth Air Force
- Lt. Gen. John B. Sams (1967), vice commander, Air Mobility Command; commander, 15th Air Force
- Lt. Gen. John W. Rosa (1973), superintendent of the United States Air Force Academy 2003–05, president of The Citadel 2006–18
- Colonel Cesar "Rico" Rodriguez (1981), F-15 pilot with 2 aerial victories in Operation Desert Storm and 1 in Bosnia; leading MIG killer of all U.S. aviators since Vietnam
- Lt. Gen. John B. Cooper (1983), Air Force deputy chief of staff for Logistics, Engineering and Force Protection

=== United States Coast Guard ===
- Chief Petty Officer Oliver F. Berry (1928), one of the first Coast Guard aircraft technicians trained to work on helicopters

=== United States Space Force ===
- Brigadier General Chandler Atwood (2001), vice commander and deputy commanding general (operations) of Space Operations Command

== Business ==
- Charles E. Daniel (1918), co-founder of Daniel International Corporation, at one time the largest construction company in the world; with Robert Hugh Daniel, a major Citadel benefactor for whom Daniel Library is named
- Randolph Guthrie (1925), chairman of the board, Studebaker
- Robert Hugh Daniel (1929), co-founder of Daniel International Corporation, at one time the largest construction company in the world; with Charles E. Daniel, a major Citadel benefactor for whom Daniel Library is named
- Alvah Chapman Jr. (1942), CEO and chairman of Knight Ridder, at one time the largest newspaper publishing company in the U.S.
- Eugene Figg (1958), founder and CEO of Figg Engineering Group, one of the world's largest bridge building companies; nationally prominent structural engineer and designer of the Sunshine Skyway Bridge
- Brig Gen Harvey Schiller, PhD (1960), commissioner, Southeastern Conference NCAA 1986–90; executive director, United States Olympic Committee 1990–94; president, Atlanta Thrashers NHL 1994–99; CEO, New York Yankees/New York Nets/New Jersey Devils 1999–2007; president, International Baseball Federation 2007–09 and current member board of directors, Baseball Hall of Fame; commercial commissioner, America's Cup; president of USA Team Handball; named several times by Sporting News as one of the 100 Most Powerful People in Sports; recipient of IOC Olympic Order, member of New York Athletic Club and Citadel Athletic Halls of Fame; retired Air Force brigadier general and combat transport pilot in Vietnam; former head of the Chemistry department at the United States Air Force Academy
- Tandy Clinton Rice, Jr. (1961), owner of Top Billing, one of the leading talent booking firms in Nashville; manager for country music stars including Dolly Parton, Porter Wagoner, Waylon Jennings, Chet Atkins and Hank Williams, Jr.; member of the Country Music Hall of Fame, former president of the Country Music Association
- Curtis Campbell (1994), president and CEO of H&R Block

== Sports ==
=== Football ===
- Andy Sabados (1939), guard, Chicago Cardinals 1939–40
- Paul Maguire (1960), led the nation in touchdown receptions by a tight end as a senior in 1959, 3d Team Associated Press All American; tight end and punter with Los Angeles/San Diego Chargers and Buffalo Bills 1960–70; played on 3 consecutive AFL championship teams and in 6 of 10 championship games; one of only 20 players who were members of the American Football League from its inception in 1960 until its merger with the NFL in 1970; longtime color commentator for college and NFL games with NBC and ESPN; member of The Citadel Athletic Hall of Fame
- John Small, Sr. (1970), 2d Team Associated Press All-American linebacker and 1st Team selection by Sporting News and Time magazine; Atlanta Falcons 1970–72, Detroit Lions 1973–75; member of The Citadel and South Carolina Athletic Halls of Fame, named to the Southern Conference 75th Anniversary Team; 1st round draft pick by Falcons in 1970
- Byron Walker (1982), wide receiver, Seattle Seahawks 1982–86
- Greg Davis (1987), kicker for Oakland, San Diego, New England, Minnesota, Atlanta, and Arizona 1987–98; co-holder of NFL record for most 50+ yard field goals in a game (3), third on Cardinals all-time scoring list with 484 points; member of The Citadel Athletic Hall of Fame
- Lester Smith Jr. (1992), 2-time 1-AA All-American and 3-time All Southern Conference selection at safety; CFL player with Baltimore Stallions 1994–95, Toronto Argonauts 1996–98 and Montreal Alouettes 1999–2001; CFL All-Star and member of 2 Grey Cup Champions; had Citadel jersey retired and member of Athletic Hall of Fame
- Travis Jervey (1995), fullback Green Bay Packers 1995–98, San Francisco 49ers 1999–2000 and Atlanta Falcons 2001–03; first member of Packers named to Pro Bowl as special teams player; only alumni to play in the Super Bowl and member of Packers championship team in Super Bowl XXXI, 1997; member of South Carolina and Citadel Athletic Halls of Fame
- Cliff Washburn (2002), All-Southern Conference selection in basketball and football, played in East-West Shrine Game and Hula Bowl; offensive tackle for numerous teams in the NFL, World League of American Football, United Football League and CFL; member of The Citadel Athletic Hall of Fame
- Nehemiah Broughton (2005), fullback Washington Redskins 2005–08, New York Giants 2009 and Arizona Cardinals 2009–10
- Andre Roberts (2010), 2-time FCS All-American wide receiver, holds numerous school records for receiving and kick returning; Arizona Cardinals 2010–2013, Washington Redskins 2014–15, Detroit Lions 2016, Atlanta Falcons 2017, New York Jets 2018, Buffalo Bills 2019-21, Houston Texans/Los Angeles Chargers 2021–; selected to the 2018 All Pro team and the 2018, 2019 and 2020 Pro Bowl as a return specialist
- Cortez Allen (2010), cornerback, Pittsburgh Steelers 2011–16
- Dee Delaney (2017), 2-time FCS All American and 3-time All Southern Conference defensive back, second on career interception list, with 13; cornerback for Jacksonville Jaguars/Miami Dolphins 2018, Washington Redskins 2019, Tampa Bay Buccaneers 2021–
- Noah Dawkins (2018), linebacker for Cincinnati Bengals/Tampa Bay Buccaneers 2019, New York Jets 2020–21
- Raleigh Webb (2019), wide receiver, Baltimore Ravens/New England Patriots 2022, Miami Dolphins/Tampa Bay Buccaneers 2023

=== Baseball ===
- Tim Jones (1983), infielder for the St. Louis Cardinals 1988–93
- Britt Reames (1996), pitcher with St. Louis Cardinals 2000, Montreal Expos 2001–03, Oakland Athletics 2005 and Pittsburgh Pirates 2006; pitching coach at Furman University and The Citadel 2008-17, member of The Citadel Athletic Hall of Fame
- Chris McGuiness (2010), 1st base Texas Rangers 2013
- Asher Wojciechowski (2010), pitcher, US national team 2009; Southern Conference Pitcher of the Year 2010; Houston Astros 2015, Cincinnati Reds 2017, Baltimore Orioles 2017–
- JP Sears (2017), pitcher New York Yankees/Oakland Athletics 2022–

=== Coaches ===
- Cal McCombs (1967), head football coach of VMI 1998–2005
- Ellis Johnson (1975), head football coach of The Citadel, Gardner–Webb and Southern Mississippi University; assistant coach at Alabama, Auburn, Clemson and South Carolina
- Fred Jordan (1979), head baseball coach, The Citadel 1992–2017; winningest coach in school and Southern Conference history with 831 victories; 13 regular season and tournament conference championships, 7 NCAA tournament appearances, 4-time Southern Conference Coach of the Year, 36 players selected in MLB draft
- Lyvonia "Stump" Mitchell (1981), running back and kick returner for St Louis Cardinals/Phoenix Cardinals 1981–89, Kansas City Chiefs 1990; assistant coach San Antonio Riders 1992, head coach Morgan State University 1996–98, running backs coach Seattle Seahawks 1999–2007 and assistant head coach and running backs coach Washington Redskins 2008–09; head coach of Southern University 2010–12, running backs coach Arizona Cardinals 2013–17, New York Jets 2017–19 and Cleveland Browns 2019–; one of only 6 Citadel players to have jersey retired; inducted into The Citadel Athletic Hall of Fame and South Carolina Athletic Hall of Fame
- Ed Conroy (1989), head basketball coach at The Citadel 2006-10, 2022–present; former head coach at Francis Marion University and Tulane University
- Tony Skole (1991), current head baseball coach, The Citadel; head baseball coach East Tennessee State University 2000–2017; starter on baseball and football teams who played in College World Series and on 2 1-AA playoff teams; member of Citadel Athletic Hall of Fame
- Dan McDonnell (1992), head baseball coach, University of Louisville 2007–; rivals.com National Coach of the Year, 2007; 5 appearances in College World Series, member of The Citadel Athletic Hall of Fame
- Chris Lemonis (1992), current head baseball coach Mississippi State University, won the 2021 National Championship in just his second season; head baseball coach Indiana University 2015–18; 6 appearances in the College World Series as a player, assistant coach and head coach

=== Officials ===
- John Hartwell (1987), athletic director, University of Louisiana, Monroe; former AD at Troy University and Utah State University
- Dallas McPherson (2001), 3rd base Anaheim Angels 2004–06, Florida Marlins 2008 and Chicago White Sox 2011; current manager of Class A Vancouver Canadians

== Government ==
=== Ambassadors ===
- Thomas B. Ferguson (1861), U.S. ambassador to Sweden 1894–1898
- William E. Gonzales (1886), U.S. ambassador to Cuba 1913–19 and Peru 1920–22
- John C. West (1942), S.C. state senator 1954–66, lt. governor 1966–70, governor of South Carolina 1971–75, U.S. ambassador to Saudi Arabia 1977–81
- James B. Culbertson (1960), U.S. ambassador to the Netherlands 2008–09
- Langhorne "Tony" Motley (1960), Alaska commissioner of commerce and economic development 1975-77, U.S. ambassador to Brazil 1981–83, assistant secretary of state 1983–85
- Lt. Gen. Hussein Al-Majali (1981), Jordanian ambassador to Bahrain 2005–10, interior minister of Jordan 2013–15

=== Governors ===
- Johnson Hagood (1847), S.C. state comptroller 1876–80, governor of South Carolina 1880–82; CSA brigadier general
- Hugh S. Thompson (1856), S.C. superintendent of education 1876–82, governor of South Carolina 1882–86, assistant U.S. Treasury secretary 1886–89, U.S. Civil Service commissioner 1889–92, namesake of Thompson Hall
- Marvin Griffin (1929), lt. governor of Georgia, 1949–1955, governor of Georgia 1955–59
- George Bell Timmerman Jr. (1937), lt. governor 1947–55, governor of South Carolina 1955–59

=== U.S. legislators ===
- George Johnstone (1865), U.S. congressman from South Carolina 1891–93
- Joseph H. Earle (1866), S.C. state representative 1878–82, state senator 1882–86, South Carolina attorney general 1886–90, U.S. senator 1897
- Charles E. Daniel (1918), U.S. senator from South Carolina 1954
- Ernest Hollings (1942), S.C. state representative 1949–55, lt. governor 1955–59, governor of South Carolina 1959–63, U.S. senator 1966–2005
- Harlan E. Mitchell (1943), U.S. congressman from Georgia 1957–60, Georgia state senator 1960–62
- Tim Valentine (1949), North Carolina House of Representatives 1955-60, U.S. congressman from North Carolina 1982–94
- Steve Buyer (1980), U.S. congressman from Indiana 1992–2010; namesake of Buyer Auditorium in Mark Clark Hall
- J. Gresham Barrett (1983), S.C. state representative 1996–2002, U.S. congressman from South Carolina 2002–10
- Nancy Mace (1999), first female cadet graduate; South Carolina state representative 2018–2021, U.S. congresswoman from South Carolina 2021–present

=== U.S. officials ===
- RADM James C. Tison Jr. (1929), sixth director of the United States Coast and Geodetic Survey, first director of the Environmental Science Services Administration Corps
- Marion Hartzog Smoak (1938), chief of protocol of the United States under President Richard Nixon 1972–1974
- Donald Latham (1955), assistant secretary of defense (Command, Control, Communications, Intelligence), 1984
- Lt. Gen. Frank Libutti USMC (1966), 1st New York City deputy police commissioner for counterterrorism 2001–03; undersecretary, Department of Homeland Security 2003–05
- Capt. William J. Luti USN (1975), National Security advisor to Vice President Dick Cheney 2001, Deputy Undersecretary of Defense 2001–05, special assistant to President George W. Bush 2005–09
- Carlos Hopkins (1993), special counsel to the Governor of Virginia; secretary of Veterans Affairs 2014-22
- Elias Irizarry (2024), special assistant to the Assistant Secretary of Defense for Special Operations and Low-Intensity Conflict 2025-present

=== State lesiglators ===
- Burnet R. Maybank Jr. (1945), S.C. state representative 1953–58; lt. governor of South Carolina 1959–63
- Oliver Bateman (1948), Georgia state senator 1965-73
- W. Brantley Harvey Jr. (1951), S.C. state representative 1958–74, lt. governor 1975–79
- William H. O'Dell (1960), S.C. state senator 1988–2016
- Bob Hall (1964), Texas state senator 2015–
- Thom Goolsby (1984), North Carolina state senator 2011–14
- Christian McDaniel (1997), Kentucky state senator 2012–present

=== State officials ===
- Fitz Johnson (1985), Georgia Public Service commissioner since 2021

=== Mayors ===
- Robert Poydasheff (1954), mayor of Columbus, Georgia 2003–2007
- Bill Workman (1961), mayor of Greenville, South Carolina 1983–1995
- Joseph P. Riley Jr. (1964), S.C. state representative 1968–74, mayor of Charleston, South Carolina 1975–2015
- Joe McElveen (1968), S.C. state representative 1986-96, mayor of Sumter, South Carolina 2000–20

=== Jurists ===
- A. Lee Chandler (1944), S.C. state representative 1972–76; associate justice and chief justice of the South Carolina Supreme Court 1984–94
- Falcon Black Hawkins Jr. (1958), United States district judge of the United States District Court for the District of South Carolina
- Harvey E. Schlesinger (1962), senior United States district judge of the United States District Court for the Middle District of Florida
- Patrick Michael Duffy(1965), senior United States district judge of the United States District Court for the District of South Carolina
- George C. James (1982), current associate justice, South Carolina Supreme Court
- Tripp Self (1990), Judge of the United States District Court for the Middle District of Georgia
- Jeff Beaverstock (1991), Chief Judge of the United States District Court for the Southern District of Alabama

== Academics ==
- Ellison Capers (1857), 1st president of Sewanee University; CSA brigadier general and Episcopal bishop of South Carolina; Capers Hall, the main academic building on campus is named in honor of him and his brother Francis W. Capers, who was SCMA superintendent 1853–59
- Colonel Oliver James Bond, SCM (1886), superintendent/president 1908-31; wrote the first detailed school history, The Story of The Citadel
- William Ephraim Mikell (1890), dean of the University of Pennsylvania Law School
- Robert Lumiansky (1933), scholar of Medieval English and president of the American Council of Learned Societies
- Dr. William H. Muller Jr. (1940), prominent cardiologist and first surgeon to implant an artificial aortic valve; longtime chairman of the Department of Surgery and vice president of the University of Virginia Health System, past president of the American College of Surgeons
- Dr. Sam C. Sarkesian (1951), prominent scholar of civil-military relations and national security; published numerous books and articles concerning various topics in these areas
- Dr. Miles Smith (2008), historian of the United States
- Dr. John Palms (1958), president of Georgia State University and the University of South Carolina
- Steve Pettit (1978), fifth president of Bob Jones University

== Authors ==
- Calder Willingham (1944), novelist, playwright and Oscar nominee; screenplays included One-Eyed Jacks, The Graduate and Little Big Man
- William Northrop (1966), writer best known for his falsification of service in Vietnam and his involvement in the Brokers of Death arms case
- Pat Conroy (1967), best-selling author whose works include The Great Santini, The Water Is Wide, The Lords of Discipline, The Prince of Tides, Beach Music, South of Broad and My Losing Season
- Robert Jordan (1974), author of the best-selling The Wheel of Time series and many other works under various names

== Religious ==
- Peter Fayssoux Stevens (1849), 4th superintendent of the South Carolina Military Academy; commanded cadets who fired on the Star of the West; commanded the Holcombe Legion in the Civil War; bishop of South Carolina in the Reformed Episcopal Church
- William Porcher DuBose (1855), priest, author, and theologian in the Episcopal Church in the United States
- Charles F. Duvall (1957), bishop of the Episcopal Diocese of the Central Gulf Coast

== Other ==
- Arland D. Williams Jr. (1957), died while saving five other passengers following the crash of Air Florida Flight 90 into the 14th Street Bridge and Potomac River in Washington, DC on January 13, 1982; posthumously awarded the Coast Guard Gold Lifesaving Medal by President Reagan; 14th Street Bridge over Potomac River named in his honor
- Morris Robinson (1991), 3-time All American football player and Grammy-winning opera singer who has performed at Carnegie Hall, La Scala in Milan, Italy and the Sydney Opera House; first Black artist to sign a recording deal with a major classical label; featured in the 2022 movie The Magic Flute
- Lu Parker (1992-MAT), Miss USA 1994
