= Helen Shanley =

American politician (1920–2009)

Member of the Connecticut House of Representatives from Harwinton
- In office 1959–1961 Serving with Albert K. Bentley
- Preceded by: Albert K. Bentley; Henry J. Delay
- Succeeded by: Dorothy Kirschner; Umbert Borzani

Personal details
- Born: June 18, 1920 Terryville, Connecticut, U.S.
- Died: February 4, 2009 (aged 88) New Haven, Connecticut, U.S.
- Party: Democratic
- Spouse(s): John B. Creel; Lloyd Shanley Jr. Thomas Nugent Courvoisie (died 2006)
- Children: 4

Helen C. Shanley (June 18, 1920 – February 4, 2009) was an American politician who served in the Connecticut House of Representatives from 1959 to 1961, representing the town of Harwinton as a Democrat.

== Personal life ==
Shanley was born on June 18, 1920, in Terryville, Connecticut. She grew up in nearby Harwinton, and in Charleston, South Carolina. She was a reporter for the Waterbury Republican for thirty years, and she had four children.

Shanley's first husband, John B. Creel, was killed in Saipan during World War II. Her second husband was Lloyd Shanley Jr., a former first selectman of Harwinton, from whom she later separated. She remained with her third husband, Thomas Nugent Courvoisie, a U.S. Army officer and Assistant Commandant of Cadets at The Citadel, until his death in 2006. Courvoisie was the subject of Pat Conroy's book The Boo.

Shanley died on February 4, 2009, at Yale New Haven Hospital in New Haven, Connecticut. She was 88.

== Political career ==
Shanley was elected to the Connecticut House of Representatives in 1958 to serve as one of two representatives from the town of Harwinton. A Democrat, Shanley served alongside Republican Albert K. Bentley for one term.
