= Evening Light =

Evening Light may refer to:

- Operation Eagle Claw (also known as Operation Evening Light)
- Sunset
