= USCGC Oliver Berry =

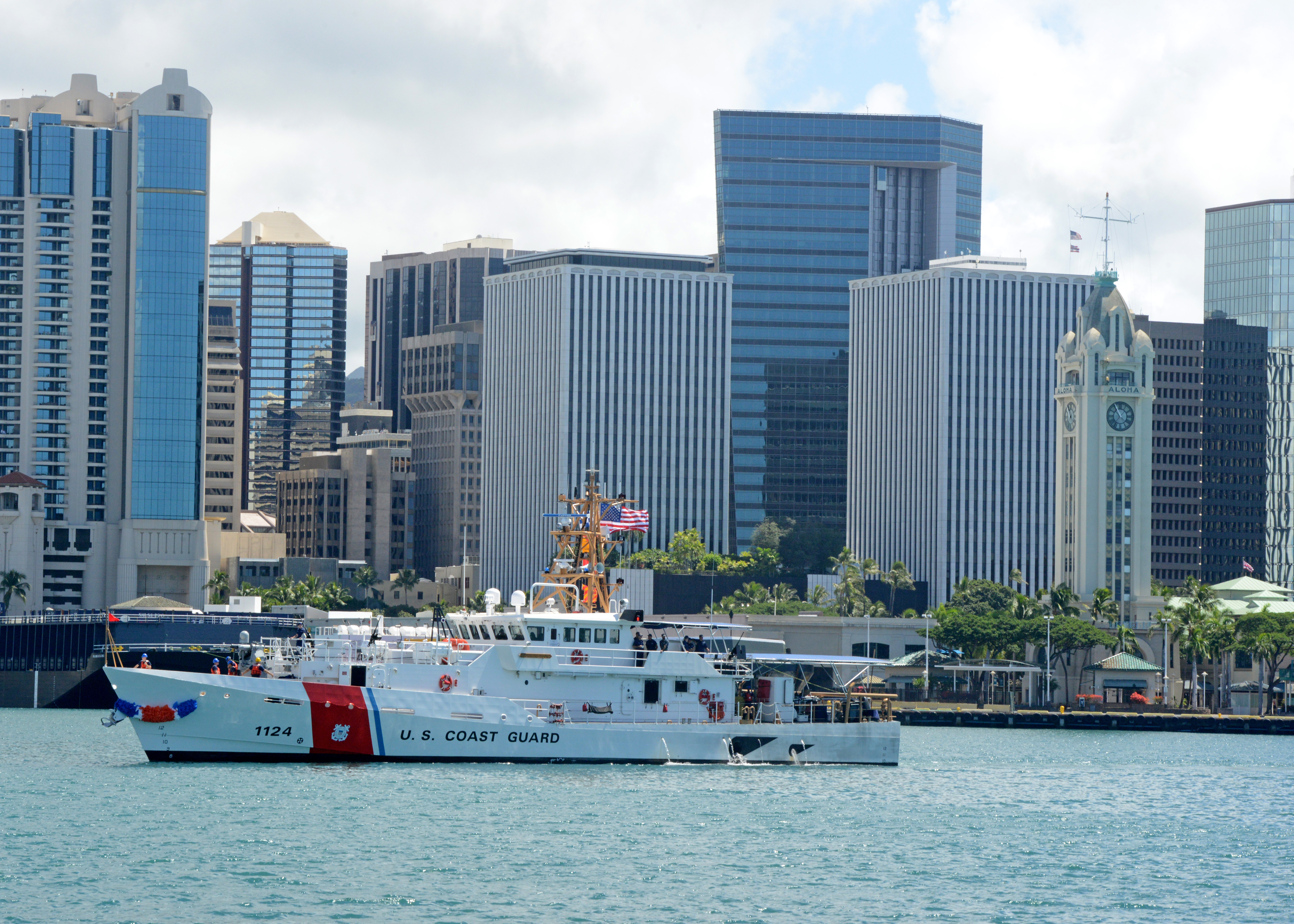
- Oliver Berry arrives in her new homeport, Honolulu

History

United States
- Name: Oliver Berry
- Namesake: Oliver F. Berry
- Operator: United States Coast Guard
- Builder: Bollinger Shipyards, Lockport, Louisiana
- Launched: June 27, 2017
- Acquired: June 27, 2017
- Commissioned: October 31, 2017
- Home port: Honolulu, Hawaii
- Identification: MMSI number: 338926424; Callsign: NOBY
- Motto: Nā kia'i o nā mokupuni, "Protector of the Islands"
- Status: in active service
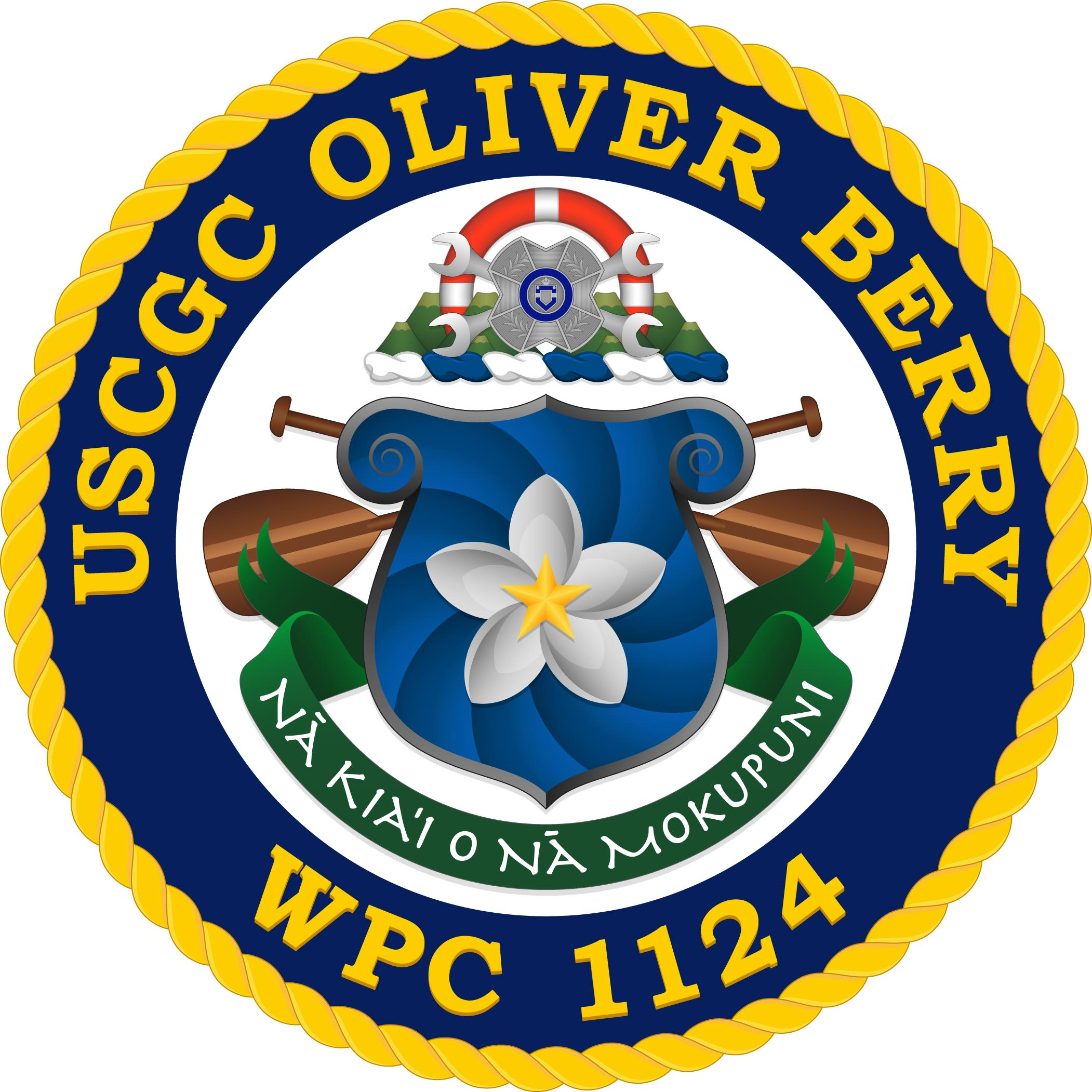
- Badge

General characteristics
- Class & type: Sentinel-class cutter
- Displacement: 353 long tons (359 t)
- Length: 46.8 m (154 ft)
- Beam: 8.11 m (26.6 ft)
- Depth: 2.9 m (9.5 ft)
- Propulsion: 2 × 4,300 kW (5,800 shp); 1 × 75 kW (101 shp) bow thruster
- Speed: 28 knots (52 km/h; 32 mph)
- Range: 2,500 nautical miles (4,600 km; 2,900 mi)
- Endurance: 5 days
- Boats & landing craft carried: 1 × Cutter Boat - Over the Horizon Interceptor
- Complement: 4 officers, 20 crew
- Sensors & processing systems: L-3 C4ISR suite
- Armament: 1 × Mk 38 Mod 2 25 mm automatic gun; 4 × crew-served Browning M2 machine guns

USCGC Oliver Berry (WPC-1124) is the United States Coast Guard's 24th Sentinel-class cutter. She was the first member of the three members of her class to be homeported in Honolulu, Hawaii.

== Design ==
Like her sister ships, Oliver Berry is designed to perform search and rescue missions, port security, and the interception of smugglers. She is armed with a remotely controlled, gyrostabilized 25 mm autocannon, four crew-served M2 Browning machine guns, and light arms. She is equipped with a stern launching ramp, that allows her to launch or retrieve a water-jet propelled high-speed auxiliary boat, without first coming to a stop. Her high-speed boat has over-the-horizon capability, and is useful for inspecting other vessels, and deploying boarding parties. She is designed to support her crew of 24 for missions of up to five days, over distances of almost 3,000 nautical miles (5,556 km; 3,452 mi).

== Operational history ==
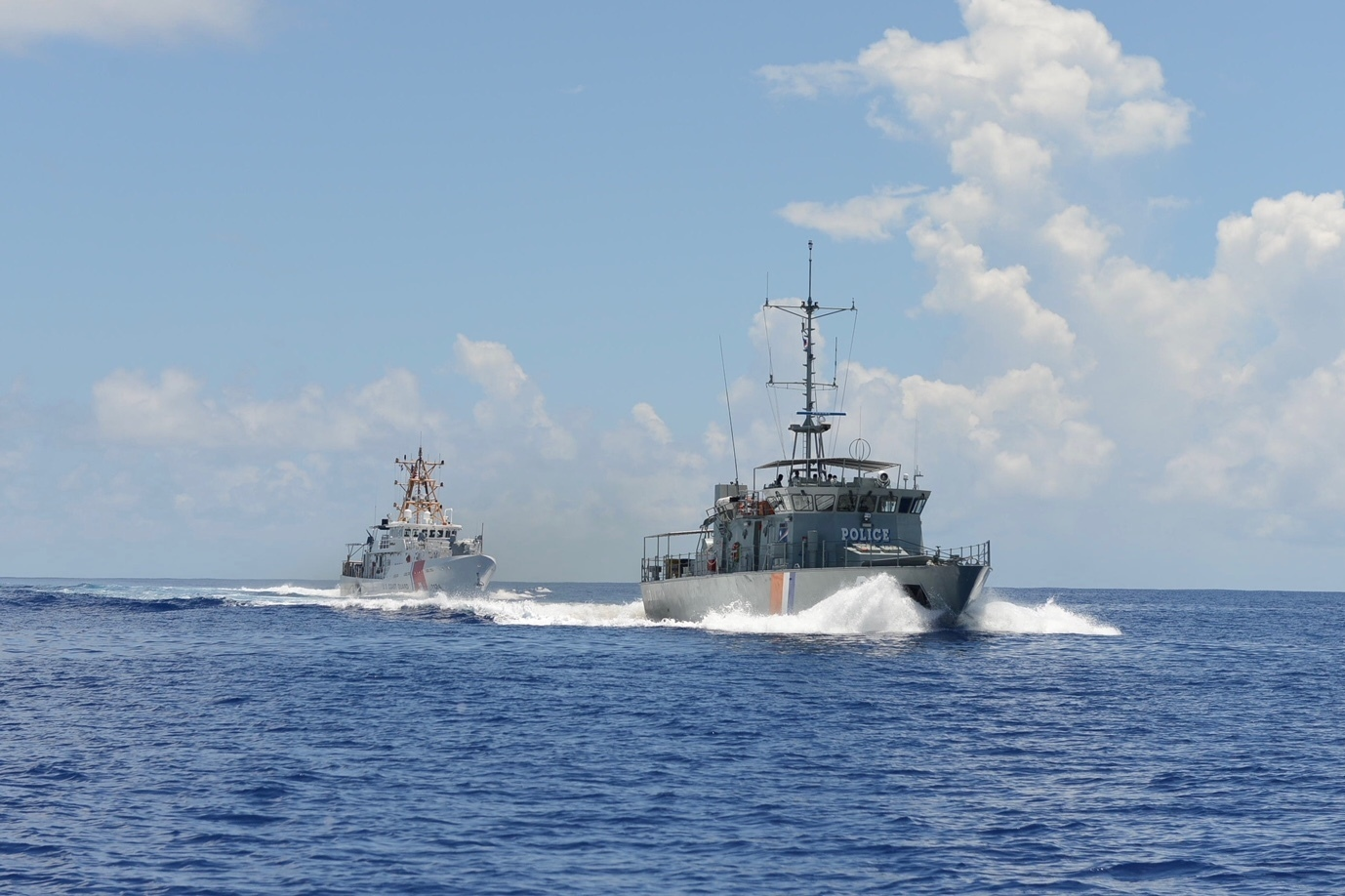
In 2018 Oliver Berry set a record when it made a 4,400-nautical-mile (8,100 km) voyage to the Marshall Islands.

In July 2018 Oliver Berry set off for the Marshall Islands, a voyage of 4,400 nautical miles (8,100 km). Since this exceeded her maximum endurance she was refueled by other Coast Guard cutters. She was the first Sentinel-class cutter to travel that far from the United States's territorial waters, and the first Sentinel-class cutter to travel on a voyage of that length. It took eight days to travel from Hawaii to Majuro Atoll, in the Marshall Islands.

When she arrived her crew engaged in joint exercises with RMIS Lomor, a Marshall Islands' patrol vessel of similar size to Oliver Berry. Her crew also engaged in various forms of cultural exchange with Marshall Islands citizens.

In July 2022, Oliver Berry provided assistance to Kiritimati Island, Kiribati, following their extreme drought.

== Namesake ==
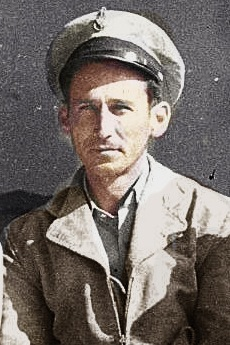
Oliver F. Berry 1908-1991

Chief Machinist's Mate Oliver F. Berry was the first Coast Guardsman to become a helicopter aviation mechanic. In 1946 he was the lead instructor at the US military helicopter training unit at Coast Guard Air Station Brooklyn.

On September 18th, 1946 a Belgian aircraft crashed near Gander, Newfoundland, leaving 18 survivors awaiting rescue. Berry quickly disassembled a Coast Guard NHS-1 helicopter for shipment and then reassembled it at Gander. The helicopter flew to the crash site and airlifted the survivors out. In recognition for his role in the rescue, Prince Charles, Royal Regent of Belgium, awarded Berry the Silver Medal of the Order of Leopold II.

In 2010, Charles "Skip" W. Bowen, who was then the United States Coast Guard's most senior non-commissioned officer, proposed that the cutters in the Sentinel class should be named after enlisted sailors in the Coast Guard, or one of its precursor services, who were recognized for their heroism. In 2015 the Coast Guard announced that Oliver Berry would be the namesake of the 24th cutter.
