= The Lords of Discipline =

1980 novel by Pat Conroy

- First edition
- Author: Pat Conroy
- Language: English
- Publisher: Houghton Mifflin
- Publication date: 1980
- Publication place: United States
- Media type: Print (hardback and paperback)
- Pages: 499
- ISBN: 0-395-29462-2
- Preceded by: The Great Santini
- Followed by: The Prince of Tides

The Lords of Discipline is a 1980 novel by Pat Conroy that was later adapted in a 1983 film of the same name.

The story centers on Will McLean, who is in his fourth year at the fictional Carolina Military Institute in Charleston, South Carolina. Will's experiences are heavily based on Pat Conroy's own experiences at The Citadel, a real military college in Charleston.

The story is narrated in first person by Will, who attends the Institute between 1963 and 1967. Will recounts his years at the institute, especially focusing on the school's brutal culture of hazing and abuse.

After discovering a secret society that drives cadets deemed unworthy of graduating from the institute to drop out by any means necessary, Will learns that graduation and lives are on the line.

== Background ==
Although Conroy drew on his experiences as a cadet at The Citadel, and also references traditions and locations of both Norwich University and Virginia Military Institute (VMI), he has said that the story is fiction and not based on his life or that of any other graduate of a military academy. Citadel alumni were critical of the novel, considering it a thinly veiled and unflattering account of the school, and Conroy was ostracized by his alma mater and effectively banned from campus for over 20 years after its publication. In 2000, The Citadel invited Conroy back to campus to receive an honorary doctorate, and again the next year as commencement speaker.

== Plot ==
An aged Will McLean, returning to the Carolina Military Institute in Charleston, South Carolina, an unknown number of years after his graduation, tells the story of his life at the institute.

In 1966, Will was an English major on a basketball scholarship, in his fourth and final year at the institute. Will was not interested in a military career. He only attended the school on account of his father, also an alumnus. Will is fulfilling a deathbed promise he made to his father that he would graduate from CMI and wear the honored CMI ring. Will is a sarcastic young man who seldom agrees with the rigidity of CMI, but is generally well-liked and his professors and peers recognize him for his integrity and fairness. Will struggles to fit into the strict military environment, but finds solace in his three roommates, who have become his closest friends: Tradd St. Croix, the son of an upper-class Charlestonian family, and two brawny Italian-American boys from the North: Dante "Pig" Pignetti and Mark Santoro. They all look forward to graduation, although Will's friends will head off to fight in the Vietnam War, which Will is personally against. However, Will does have some pride in the institute, representing it in basketball. Though anti-war, he also despises the discrimination the Institute faces from civilian students of other colleges due to its military association, which he sees at away games. For example, when Will plays a game against the Virginia Military Institute, which is considered their biggest rival game, he notes that VMI was the only team all season that did not harass him and his teammates.

Retired US Army Colonel Thomas "The Bear" Berrineau, the Commandant of Cadets, asks Will to look out for the institute's first black cadet, Tom Pearce. The Bear knows that Will is the only cadet unopposed to racial integration. Will also begins a secret relationship with Annie Kate Gervais, a girl from an upper-class Charlestonian family who has become pregnant from a boy who refused to marry her. Will knows their relationship has no future either, because Will is Irish-American, Catholic, and not wealthy. Will attempts to aid a struggling freshman, Poteete, who has been targeted by numerous upperclassmen. Shamed by his inability to cope with the harshness of the institute's freshman system, Poteete hangs himself, leaving behind his ominous claim of a "house where they take freshmen" to be tormented outside the oversight of the Commandant's office.

In an extended flashback, Will describes his own plebe year three years earlier. He learned that the only way to survive is to bond closely with the other members of his class against the cadre. Having entered the college on a basketball scholarship, Will is also protected by other members of the basketball team who don't want to see Will physically harmed and, at one point, rescue him from a particularly brutal hazing incident. Many of Will's classmates are not so lucky, and they resign from the school due to the unrelenting hazing.

One recruit swiftly rises to prominence: Bobby Bentley, who has a problem with urinating on himself due to the stress of hazing but is otherwise in excellent shape. Bentley refuses to quit on himself or his classmates, and he endures all the upperclassmen's torment. Conventional hazing methods fail to break Bentley, and his classmates gradually rally around him, making Will's cadre the subject of ridicule of the entire corps of cadets. One evening, Bentley is taken off campus by unknown individuals. The next day, he withdraws from the Institute for unknown reasons. A first classman claims that it was the doing of The Ten, a secret society of cadets. Its members are handpicked for embodying the greatest virtues of the institute. The Ten ensures certain cadets, deemed unacceptable to "wear the ring" (that is, to be a graduate of the institute, denoted by wearing of a class ring), are run out by any means necessary. Once it became clear the R Company cadre had failed to run Bentley out of the school, The Ten had decided to act. Near the end of the year, Will's freshman class is recognized as cadets, and the hazing ends. Will vows to himself that he will never participate in tormenting future generations of plebes, seeing no value in organized cruelty.

Back in Will's senior year, he hears new rumors of The Ten. Aided in his investigation by a mentor, a professor in the history department, Will discovers that The Ten is a real group and they are trying to run Pearce out to keep the Institute all white. Will and the other seniors receive their class rings in a solemn ceremony, and Will wins the final basketball game of his career in quadruple overtime against the Virginia Military Institute.

Annie Kate's baby is stillborn, and she rejects Will, wanting to forget all about the time she spent pregnant. Will looks further into The Ten and reconnects with Bobby Bentley. Bentley reveals that, during their plebe year, he was spirited away to a house, and was threatened, tortured, and finally agreed to quit when The Ten prepared to burn him alive. Bentley says his ultimate decision to quit was not due to the torture, but the realization he no longer wished to be associated with any organization that would have a group like The Ten. Bentley recalls one member of The Ten, whom they piece together as a high-ranking cadet from their plebe year. Will, Mark, and Pig learn this Ten member is now a student at a nearby law school. They abduct and interrogate him on a secluded railroad track until he reveals the location of the house, which is a plantation house owned by General Bentley Durrell, the superintendent of the institute.

When Pearce is kidnapped by The Ten, Will goes to the house and interrupts the torture of Pearce. Pig and Mark arrive to rescue Will as The Ten pursue him, but The Ten now know of the few trying to move against them. Pearce is intimidated into silence. The Ten begin a campaign to have Mark, Pig and Will expelled from school. Pig is caught on an honor code violation due to the Ten and loses the honor court case, despite Will, Tradd and Mark each speaking in his defense. After Pig is expelled, he throws himself in front of a train, killing himself. Will and Mark soon after are issued demerits for a wide range of offenses, real and fabricated. Just as they are about to be dismissed, Will discovers that Tradd's father was a member of The Ten. He and Mark read his journals and discover the names of all current and former members. They also realize Tradd is the father of Annie Kate's baby, is a member of The Ten in their class, and was thus informing on his roommates from the start. Will confronts Tradd and ends their friendship.

Facing expulsion for excess demerits, Will confronts General Durrell and demands that he and Mark be allowed to graduate. Durrell refuses, citing their extensive list of infractions and the fact that the law student they abducted is looking to press charges. The Bear then enters the General's office, informing him that multiple cadets who were run out of the Institute are willing to attest in court to The Ten's existence and activities. General Durrell relents when also faced with the threat of exposure to the press, as evidenced by Mark seen outside with letters containing the information ready to be mailed. Will and Mark are allowed to graduate, but General Durrell's decision to fire Colonel Berrineau as Commandant stands. The General and The Ten survive with their power intact, but forever shaken, as for the first time an opponent has stood against them and won.

Shortly before graduation, Will receives a letter from Annie Kate, thanking him for standing by her and saying he will make a good husband to whatever woman he finds. Reflecting on his graduation, Will notes that eight of his fellow cadets will eventually be killed in action in the Vietnam War, Mark among them. Will also reveals that The Ten member and class "golden boy" John Alexander would eventually fade into obscurity, last seen working as an ROTC instructor at a small university, while Mark Santoro tops the entire class in awards for valor. As Will receives his diploma from the institute, General Durrell coldly orders him not to disgrace the ring, but Will simply replies with "Dante Pignetti", honoring his former roommate and showing his contempt for the General by breaking the school's taboo of ever speaking the name of an expelled cadet. The Bear appears at their graduation to congratulate Will. Disgusted at seeing General Durrell's signature on his diploma, Will asks Colonel Berrineau to sign it as Will wants the name of a man he can respect on the diploma. The Bear hands the diploma back without signing it, remarking, "There already is, Bubba", pointing to Will's name.

== Characters ==
- Will McLean – The protagonist and narrator, who is heavily based on Pat Conroy in his college years. Will is independent, irreverent and sarcastic, and, unlike the rest of his classmates, does not wish to join the military after graduation. He is, however, generally well-liked on campus for being fair, kind, and with a firm sense of integrity. Unlike most of his classmates, Will never advances beyond the rank of cadet private. The story is told retrospectively some time after his graduation.
- Tradd St. Croix – Will's roommate and friend, from a very rich and respected old Charlestonian family. Will was close to him and his parents, Abigail and Commerce St. Croix, but their friendship ends after Will discovers he was a member of The Ten.
- Dante "Pig" Pignetti – Will's roommate and friend, and a brawny Italian-American from New York. He comes from a poor family, is prone to violence and is extremely protective of his friends and his fiancée Theresa. He is run out of the Institute by the Ten after they catch him on an honor code violation, driving him to suicide.
- Mark Santoro – Will's roommate and friend, another Italian-American from Philadelphia who is loyal to Will to the end. He dies fighting in Vietnam some time after graduation, the most decorated Carolina Military Institute graduate of the Vietnam War.
- Tom Pearce – The first black student to attend the institute, whom Will is assigned to watch over and ensure he fairly makes it through his plebe year. Pearce does survive his first year at the institute, but is intimidated into silence by The Ten and ultimately cuts ties with Will.
- Annie Kate Gervais – A young pregnant woman from an upper-class Charlestonian family that has fallen on hard times whom Will befriends and later falls in love with. Annie Kate struggles with loneliness due to the fact that she must hide her pregnancy after her baby's father refuses to marry her. Annie Kate ends her relationship with Will after her baby is stillborn. She moves to California to attend college and asks Will not to contact her, but not before confirming to Will that Tradd was the child's father.
- General Bentley Durrell – President of the Carolina Military Institute, highly decorated retired U.S. Army general renowned for his service in World War II, Institute graduate and member of The Ten. Will is initially among many in the Corps of Cadets who admire General Durrell, but swiftly reverses his opinion as he learns General Durrell has been fully aware of The Ten's activities and actively aiding their efforts.
- Bobby Bentley – Will's classmate who is targeted by upperclassmen due to his wetting himself during his freshman year. His perseverance in the face the brutal hazing he experiences inspires Will's class to come together, but he is ultimately driven out by The Ten.
- Colonel "The Bear" Berrineau – The Commandant of the Cadets in charge of maintaining discipline and helping students at the institute. Greatly feared and respected in the Corps of Cadets, "The Bear" has a gruff and ferocious exterior that hides his deeply-compassionate nature. Among cadets, an unspoken rule exists that if one needs help and has nowhere else to turn, "The Bear" will assist in any way he can. The character was based on Lieutenant Colonel Thomas "The Boo" Courvoisie, an iconic former Assistant Commandant at The Citadel who was also the subject of Conroy's first book, The Boo.
- John Alexander- Favored "golden boy" of the Class of 1967 and member of The Ten, Alexander commands 4th Battalion in the Corps of Cadets and has been a personal enemy of Will's since their fourth-classman year. Alexander is outwardly a model "Institute man," flawlessly adhering to every military regulation and rising high in cadet rank, but fades into obscurity later in his life.
- Colonel Edward T. Reynolds: The impassioned, outrageous, and obese professor of History who emerges as one of Will's mentors at the institute after an exchange of insults in Will's fourth classman year. Named "Edward the Great" by cadets for his grandiose and egotistical style of lecturing, he quietly aids Will's efforts to find whether The Ten exists.
- John "Bucky" Poteete – A freshman mentored by Will who struggles with the brutal hazing at the institute. He commits suicide after being kidnapped and tortured by The Ten, driving Will into a depression.

== Reception ==
The novel received generally positive reviews.

== Film adaptation ==
The novel was adapted for the screenplay of a 1983 film of the same name, starring David Keith as Will McLean and Robert Prosky as Colonel "The Bear" Berrineau. The film version took place entirely in McLean's senior year, when he was asked to protect Pearce. Several plot points were changed for the film:

- In the novel, Poteete kills himself by hanging, having earlier survived attempting suicide by jumping off a roof (having been thwarted by Mark and Will). In the film, he is an outcast but not suicidal. He is seen saying he will be accepted if he performs the dangerous stunt of jumping from one rooftop to another. In his attempt to do so, Poteete misses and falls.
- McLean was assigned the duty of protecting Pearce because of McLean's perceived liberalism. In the film, McLean was assigned the duty to repay The Bear for protecting him during his own plebe year.
- After his "walk of shame", Pignetti commits suicide by walking into the path of a speeding train. In the film, he simply gets into a taxicab called for him and is never seen again, and as part of Will's deal with Durrell, Pignetti is to be reinstated at the Institute and allowed to complete his degree.
- Tradd's motivation for joining The Ten is not as well explained in the film, and the novel's entire "Honey Prince" subplot of Tradd's effeminate nature is never depicted. In both the book and film, Tradd admits it was his father also being a member, ensuring him legacy status, and was enthralled with membership in The Ten being the institute's highest honor. Tradd in the film expresses some remorse over The Ten's misdeeds. The film makes a brief aside to Tradd's lack of manliness, with Commerce commending how Will looks good in uniform whereas Tradd does not seem soldierly "even if he was wearing a suit of armor".
- The entire plotline concerning McLean and Annie Kate Gervais, the mother of his roommate Tradd St Croix's illegitimate—and ultimately stillborn—child, is not in the film.
- In the film, Pearce apologizes for turning his back on McLean, explaining that he did it because of survival, and if he did not make it, "the next nigger has my record around his neck like a rock". In the novel, McLean has no further contact with Pearce after that.
- The novel speaks of the death of General Durrell's son, who Will remembered as an obscure cadet who could not escape his father's shadow. The notification of this death causes the cadets to go to General Durell's house, where his wife requests the cadets in bright anger to "kill Vietcong". In the film, the ring ceremony is interrupted with General Durrell reading a letter of his son being killed in action. Will and the others then hold a candlelight vigil before Mr. and Mrs. Durrell singing Dixie.
