= Thomas Nugent Courvoisie =

United States Army officer (1916–2006)

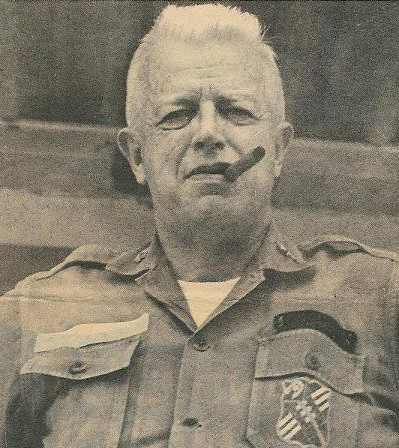
- LtCol Thomas N. Courvoisie ("The Boo")
- Nickname: "The Boo"
- Born: October 16, 1916; Savannah, Georgia, US
- Died: April 30, 2006 (aged 89) Mount Pleasant, South Carolina, US
- Buried: Beaufort National Cemetery
- Allegiance: United States
- Branch: Georgia National Guard; South Carolina National Guard; United States Army
- Service years: 1938 – 1961
- Rank: Lieutenant Colonel
- Conflicts: World War II; *European Theater
- Awards: Order of the Palmetto; Bronze Star Medal

Lieutenant Colonel Thomas Nugent Courvoisie (October 16, 1916 – April 30, 2006) was a United States Army Officer and Assistant Commandant of Cadets at The Citadel who was the subject of The Boo, the first book authored by famed novelist Pat Conroy and the inspiration for "The Bear" in Conroy's novel The Lords of Discipline.

== Biography ==
Born in Savannah, Georgia, he attended Benedictine Military School, graduating in 1934. Starting in the fall of 1934, Courvoisie attended The Citadel in Charleston, South Carolina, until health problems forced him to withdraw 2 years later. From 1936 he served as a crew member on a freighter, later joining the Georgia National Guard in 1938 and seeing combat in a field artillery unit during The Battle of the Bulge in World War II. Returning to The Citadel in 1950 as a veteran student while serving as an instructor with the South Carolina National Guard, he graduated in 1952 and was commissioned into the U.S. Army, serving in the Korean War. In 1959, he was assigned to The Citadel as an Assistant Professor of Military Science and after retiring from the military in 1961 was appointed Assistant Commandant of Cadets for Discipline.

Courvoisie became a feared but respected figure and gained a reputation as a stern disciplinarian; his nickname “The Boo” came about when cadets described his hulking figure as "looking like a caribou" and then shortened the description. He famously referred to his charges as "Lambs" and addressed them as "Bubba" if all was well, or "Bum" if not. Despite his gruff exterior and demanding personality he could also be compassionate, bailing cadets out of jail or even paying for their class rings. He also worked behind the scenes to help smooth integration when the first black cadet matriculated in 1966. Pushed out in a political struggle with the administration in 1968, he was reassigned as warehouse supervisor and retired from the college in 1982.

Courvoisie's legend grew with the publishing in 1970 of The Boo, Pat Conroy's collection of short stories and reminiscences of his years on the campus; he was also the basis for the fictional character of Colonel Thomas Berrineau (“The Bear”) in Conroy's 1980 novel The Lords of Discipline, played in the 1983 movie version by actor Robert Prosky. He was awarded an honorary doctorate by The Citadel in 2000 along with Conroy (who was ostracized by many alumni after the release of the book whose thinly veiled account of his time as a cadet was seen as an unflattering depiction of his alma mater). When the school opened a new alumni center in 2001, Conroy led a fundraising campaign to pay for the fitting out of the banquet room which was named "Courvoisie Hall." Courvoisie was also awarded the Order of the Palmetto, the highest honor given by the state of South Carolina, and received the Bronze Star for his combat service in World War II.

== Legacy ==
Courvoisie died of natural causes in 2006 at the age of 89 and was interred at the Beaufort National Cemetery in Beaufort, South Carolina. His first wife, Elizabeth Genevieve Cosner, an Army Nurse whom he met during his military service, died in 1985; he was survived by his third wife, Helen Shanley, and daughter Dr. Helen Courvoisie of Baltimore, Maryland. His son, Alfred Courvoisie II (1947-2009), also attended The Citadel, graduating with the Class of 1969. Alfred did not follow his father into the U.S. Army, instead becoming a football, baseball and basketball coach at St. Andrew's Parish High School in Charleston, South Carolina, for 30 years.

Courvoisie is featured prominently in two of fellow Citadel graduate Pat Conroy's books; the first, The Boo, published in 1970, detailed stories of cadet life at The Citadel in the 1960s and how feared and respected Courvoisie was in the South Carolina Corps of Cadets, as well as the political struggle that saw Courvoisie transferred away from the Commandant's office. Conroy later wrote in an updated edition of The Boo of how Courvoisie helped him come up with the first line of Conroy's best-known novel, The Lords of Discipline: "I wear the ring."

Courvoisie Banquet Hall, The Citadel's alumni center since 2001, was renovated in 2017 and continues to honor "The Boo" and his love for his alma mater.
