= Oliver F. Berry =

United States Coast Guard chief petty officer (1908–1991)

Oliver Fuller Berry
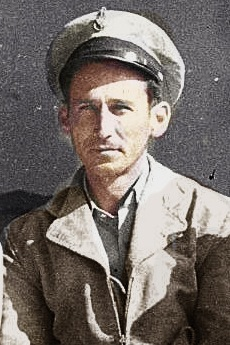
- Oliver Berry in September 1946
- Born: March 8, 1908; Marion, South Carolina, US
- Died: September 13, 1991 (aged 83); Florence, South Carolina, US
- Burial place: Mount Hope Cemetery, Florence
- Military career
- Allegiance: United States of America
- Branch: United States Coast Guard
- Service years: 1928–1950
- Rank: Chief Petty Officer

Oliver Fuller Berry (March 8, 1908 - September 13, 1991) was a chief petty officer in the United States Coast Guard who was chosen to be the namesake for the twenty-fourth cutter of the Sentinel class. He was one of the first Coast Guard aircraft technicians trained to work on helicopters.

== Early life ==
Berry was born in Marion, South Carolina, and graduated from The Citadel in 1928; originally an officer in the United States Army Reserve he gave up his commission to enlist in the Coast Guard.

== Coast Guard service ==
Berry became a highly skilled mechanic working on early Coast Guard aircraft both land based and seaplanes. He was also one of the world's first experts on the maintenance of helicopters and was lead instructor at the first military helicopter training unit, the Rotary Wing Development Unit, which was established at Coast Guard Air Station Elizabeth City, North Carolina, in 1946. He also helped develop the rescue hoist.

In the same year, Berry played a role in a helicopter rescue from a US base in Gander, Newfoundland, that earned him a commendation. Helicopters were new to search and rescue and one was urgently required to search for survivors of a commercial airliner crash in Newfoundland. Berry was able to quickly disassemble one of the primitive helicopters of the time so that its parts could be flown to Gander in a cargo plane and then quickly reassemble it in time to find and rescue several survivors. He was awarded the Silver Medal of the Order of Leopold II by Prince Charles, the Royal Regent of Belgium, for his contribution to the rescue of eighteen Belgian citizens.

== Legacy ==
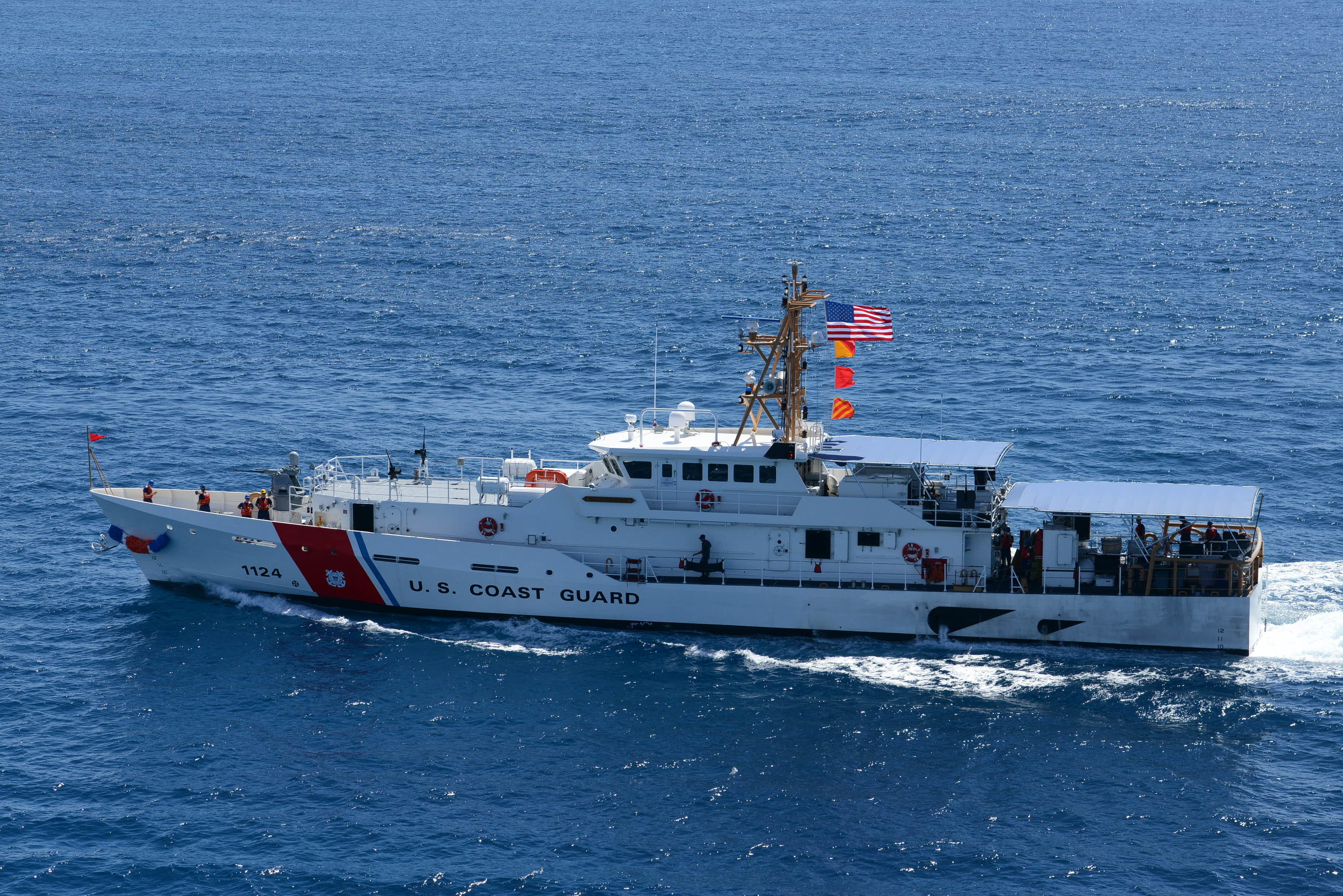
The Oliver Berry USCGC ship named forOliver F. Berry 1908-1991

The Coast Guard established an annual award named after Berry, issued to an outstanding aircraft technician who best followed his tradition.

In 2015, the Coast Guard announced that one of the new Sentinel class cutters would be named after Berry. All the ships in that class are named after enlisted personnel who distinguished themselves through a heroic act. Bollinger shipyards completed the USCGC Oliver F. Berry (WPC 1124) and delivered her to the Coast Guard, in Key West, for her sea trials, on June 27, 2017. Commissioning took place at the vessel's home port of Honolulu, Hawaii, on October 31, 2017.
