= Frank Libutti =

United States Marine Corps general

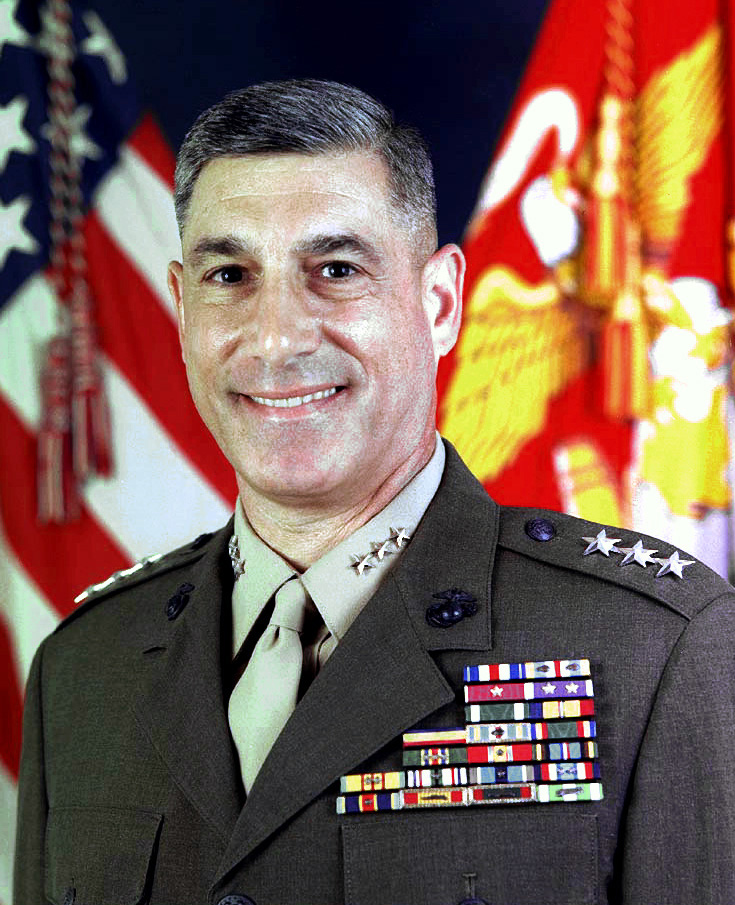
- Libutti as a Marine
- Born: April 23, 1945 (age 81); Huntington, New York, U.S.
- Military career
- Allegiance: United States
- Branch: United States Marine Corps
- Service years: 1966–2001
- Rank: Lieutenant General
- Commands: 11th Marine Expeditionary Unit; Joint Task Force Provide Relief; 1st Marine Division (United States); III Marine Expeditionary Force; United States Marine Corps Forces Pacific
- Conflicts: Vietnam War
- Awards: Defense Distinguished Service Medal; Silver Star; Defense Superior Service Medal (3); Legion of Merit (2); Purple Heart (3); Cheon-Su Medal; Order of the Rising Sun
- Other work: Deputy New York City Police Commissioner; Undersecretary at United States Department of Homeland Security

Frank Libutti is a retired United States Marine Corps Lieutenant General who also served as the head of the New York City Police Department's Counter Terrorism Bureau, Deputy Police Commissioner, and oversaw the Department of Homeland Security's intelligence operations as Undersecretary for Information Analysis and Infrastructure Protection. Libutti's military career included time spent in Vietnam, Japan, Korea, Kenya and Somalia among assignments within the United States during which he oversaw more than 80,000 Marines.

Libutti is a native of Huntington, New York, and a graduate of The Citadel.

== Marine Corps career ==
He entered the Marine Corps's Officer Candidates School at Marine Corps Base Quantico in August 1966, and was commissioned as a Second Lieutenant in October of that year. He was assigned to 1st Battalion, 9th Marines as a platoon commander in Vietnam.

In 1968, Libutti returned to Quantico for duty at the Officer Candidates School, serving consecutively as Chief Instructor, Tactics Section, as well as Commanding Officer and Branch Head, Academic Section. He was promoted to captain in November 1969 attended the Amphibious Warfare School. In 1972, Libutti transferred to Amphibious Squadron Three in San Diego, California for duty as Squadron Combat Cargo Officer. In 1974, he was assigned to 1st Battalion 2nd Marines at Marine Corps Base Camp Lejeune, North Carolina, as an Infantry Company Commander for 14 months, followed by staff positions such as Logistics Officer and Operations Officer.

Libutti was promoted to major in May 1977 and reassigned as the Executive Officer for Marine Barracks, Naples, Italy. In August 1980, he attended the Command and Staff College at Quantico, then transferred to Headquarters Marine Corps in Washington, D.C., for duty as the Head of the Career Management Section, Manpower Department. In May 1982, he was promoted to lieutenant colonel and reassigned as the Assistant Secretary of the General Staff for the Office of the Assistant Commandant and Chief of Staff, where he served through May 1983. He was reassigned in June 1983 as the Senior Marine Aide to the Commandant of the Marine Corps.

From August 1985 until June 1986, Libutti attended the National War College, Washington, D.C. Following graduation, he was assigned as the Executive Officer, 1st Marine Regiment at Marine Corps Base Camp Pendleton, California. He was reassigned as the Commanding Officer of 1st Reconnaissance Battalion until October 1987, when he was promoted to colonel and designated as the Commanding Officer, Contingency MAGTF 1-88 and deployed to the Middle East for the "Tanker War".

Returning to Camp Pendleton in May 1988, Libutti served as the Assistant Chief of Staff, Intelligence, 1st Marine Division. He commanded the 11th Marine Expeditionary Unit in August 1988 until July 1990. The following month, he was reassigned to the Office of the Chairman of the Joint Chiefs of Staff, for duty as the Marine Corps Member of The Chairman's Staff Group. In The Chairman's Staff Group, Libutti also served as the Military Assistant to the Presidential Emissary to Hanoi for POW/MIA issues and participated in high level trips to Hanoi for negotiations on the POW/MIA issue with Vietnam. While serving in this capacity, he was selected in December for promotion to brigadier general and was promoted to that grade in March 1992.

Libutti was then assigned as the Commander, Forward Headquarters Element/Inspector General of the United States Central Command, MacDill Air Force Base, Florida, in July 1992. The following month he was designated Commanding General, Joint Task Force Provide Relief (which provided emergency airlift of food to Somalia and Kenya), until November 1992. From 1994 to 1996 he assumed the duties as Commanding General, 1st Marine Division. During his last assignment, he served as the Commanding General, III Marine Expeditionary Force/Commander, Marine Corps Bases Japan until June 8, 1999. Libutti retired from the Corps in 2001.

=== Awards and honors ===
Libutti's awards include:

1st Row	Defense Distinguished Service Medal	Navy Marine Corps Distinguished Service Medal	Silver Star	Defense Superior Service Medal w/ 2 oak leaf clusters
2nd Row	Legion of Merit w/ 1 award star	Purple Heart w/ 2 award stars	Navy and Marine Corps Commendation Medal	Combat Action Ribbon
3rd Row	Navy Presidential Unit Citation	Joint Meritorious Unit Award w/ 1 oak leaf cluster	Navy Unit Commendation	Navy Meritorious Unit Commendation
4th Row	National Defense Service Medal w/ 1 service star	Armed Forces Expeditionary Medal	Vietnam Service Medal w/ 2 service stars	Southwest Asia Service Medal w/ 1 service star
5th Row	Humanitarian Service Medal w/ 1 service star	Navy Sea Service Deployment Ribbon w/ 2 service stars	Navy & Marine Corps Overseas Service Ribbon	Order of the Rising Sun, 2nd class
6th Row	Order of National Security Merit, Cheon-Su Medal	Vietnam Gallantry Cross unit citation	Vietnam Civil Actions unit citation	Vietnam Campaign Medal

== Deputy Police Commissioner ==
As New York City's deputy police commissioner, Libutti oversaw more than 300 people working in the Counter Terrorism Bureau, which aims to prevent and prepare for any possible terrorism attack. He was named to this post in January 2002 by Police Commissioner Raymond Kelly who planned to increase the number of detectives assigned to the Joint Terrorist Task Force and reorganize the police contingent assigned to the task force, which works with the FBI. In his role, Libutti was responsible for counterterrorism training, prevention and investigations and served as a liaison to state and federal agencies.

== Department of Homeland Security ==
Libutti was nominated by President George W. Bush in 2003 to serve as the Undersecretary for information analysis and infrastructure protection at the Department of Homeland Security. He was the first person nominated for the new position in the then two-month-old Homeland Security Department. In addition to traditional counterterrorism and security measures, Libutti's tenure included the launch of a cyber alert system that was part of the initiative to secure cyberspace as well as initiatives designed to protect stadiums and sporting event attendees.

== Personal ==
In the 2024 United States presidential election, Libutti endorsed Kamala Harris.
