= James B. Vaught =

United States Army general

Lieutenant General James B. Vaught
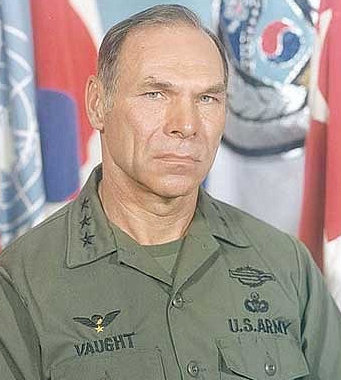
- Born: November 3, 1926; Conway, South Carolina, US
- Died: September 20, 2013 (aged 86); Horry County, South Carolina, US
- Burial place: Tilly Swamp Baptist Church Cemetery; Conway, South Carolina
- Military career
- Allegiance: United States
- Branch: United States Army
- Service years: 1944–1985
- Rank: Lieutenant General
- Nickname: "The General"
- Commands: ROK-US Combined Forces Command; 24th Infantry Division; 5th Battalion, 7th Cavalry
- Conflicts: World War II; Korean War; Vietnam War; Iran Hostage Crisis (Operation Eagle Claw)

James Benjamin Vaught (November 3, 1926 – September 20, 2013) was a United States Army Lieutenant General who fought in the Korean War and the Vietnam War. In South Korea he served as a company commander in the 24th Infantry Division. In 1967, in South Vietnam, on his first tour he served as the commanding officer of the 5th Battalion, 7th Cavalry. He also played a major role in numerous United States Special Forces operations. He was the overall commander of Operation Eagle Claw, the failed rescue mission of U.S. hostages in Iran in 1980.

== Early life and military career ==
Vaught grew up in Conway, South Carolina. A multi-generational native of the state, he has been identified as a direct descendant of Francis "Swamp Fox" Marion. However, this is in dispute, as there are no known direct descendants of Marion. He graduated from high school in 1943 and was then enrolled at The Citadel military college in Charleston. During this time, with World War II being fought by Allied forces in two theaters, the draft was altered so that college students were eligible. In 1944, Vaught was one of those drafted by the United States Army, although he was able to graduate and become a member of the Citadel's class of 1946. In the Army, he was commissioned an officer in 1945. After the war, he served three and a half years in West Germany.

== Korean and Vietnam Wars ==
After his duty in West Germany ended, Vaught had a relatively short stay back in the U.S. before he was sent to South Korea, where he was involved in the fighting against the communist forces of North Korea and China. He saw combat on several occasions after his landing at Pusan and the subsequent advance north towards the Yalu River. During this time, he was injured twice.

In 1967 during the Vietnam War, he was sent to South Vietnam, where as the battalion commander of the 5th Battalion, 7th Cavalry, he played a key role in the Battle of Huế during the Tet Offensive of 1968. He also participated in Operation Pegasus, the relief of Khe Sanh Combat Base. Vaught was later injured in an auto accident which resulted in him being evacuated, in a full body cast, to Walter Reed Army Medical Center. Although the Vietnamization policy was considered a failed concept, Vaught was a proponent of the policy and was a valuable asset to it throughout his second tour of Vietnam.

== Later life ==
After Vietnam, Vaught continued his career with the Army and was eventually promoted to Major General, serving at The Pentagon as Director of Operations and Mobilization for the Army. He served his final tour of duty as the Commanding General of the Combined US/South Korean forces.

He resided in Myrtle Beach, South Carolina after his retirement in 1985.

=== Operation Eagle Claw ===
Perhaps his most notable role was during Operation Eagle Claw, the infamous failed rescue mission of hostages in Iran, where General Vaught served as the overall commander of the operation in 1980. Eight service members died and four were injured in the operation when one of the helicopters on the mission collided with a transport aircraft in the remote Iranian desert.

Although President Carter went on television the next day to announce the failure of the mission and to accept the blame, Congress and the Pentagon launched inquiries to determine the reasons for the tragedy. The Pentagon probe was handled by a board of three retired and three serving flag officers representing all four services; it was led by retired Admiral James L. Holloway III. The commission's report listed 23 areas "that troubled us professionally about the mission-areas in which there appeared to be weaknesses". The major criticism was of the "ad hoc" nature of the task force, a chain of command the commission felt was unclear, and an emphasis on operational secrecy it found excessive. The commission also said the chances for success would have been improved if more backup helicopters had been provided and if a rehearsal of all mission components had been held.

== Awards ==
Vaught was a two-time recipient of the Silver Star award in Vietnam. Other US awards include three Legions of Merit, the Distinguished Flying Cross, the Soldier's Medal, two Bronze Star Medals, the Meritorious Service Medal, six Air Medals, the Joint Service Commendation Medal, two Army Commendation Medals, and the Purple Heart medal.

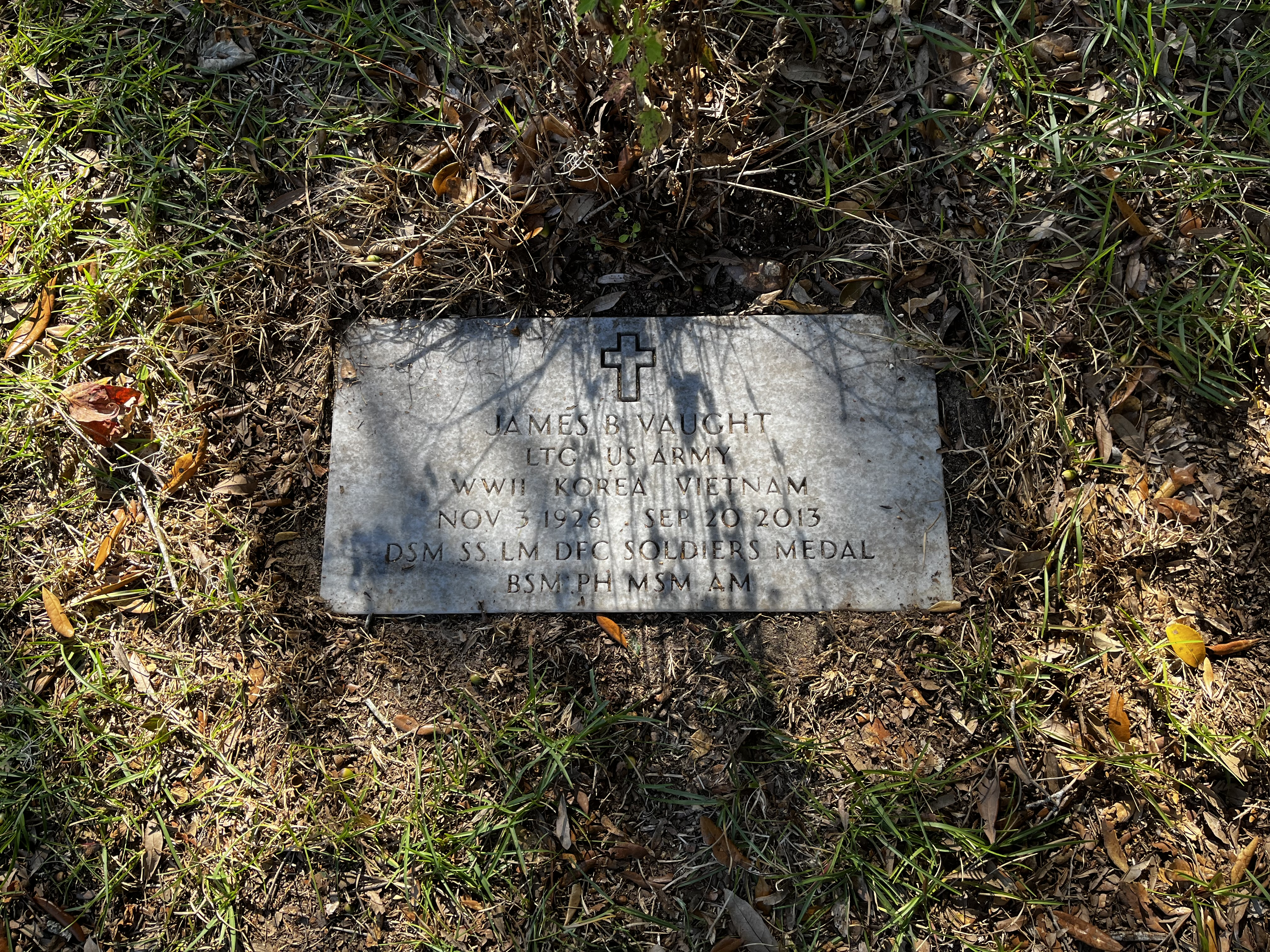
General Vaught Gravesite at Tilly's Swamp Baptist Church on Hwy 90 near Conway SC

== Death ==
Authorities found his body in a pond in Horry County, South Carolina. While Vaught died of asphyxia due to drowning, the coroner stated that his body also showed signs of cardiac disease. He was 86.
