= Herbert Beckington =

United States Marine Corps general

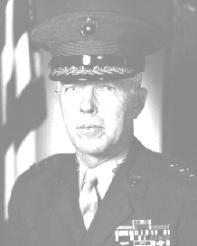

Inspector General of the United States Agency for International Development
- In office September 1, 1977 – August 26, 1994
- President: Jimmy Carter; Ronald Reagan; George H. W. Bush; Bill Clinton
- Preceded by: Position established
- Succeeded by: Jeffrey Rush

Personal details
- Born: October 3, 1920 Rockford, Illinois, U.S.
- Died: October 14, 2007 (aged 87) Alexandria, Virginia, U.S.
- Resting place: Arlington National Cemetery
- Education: The Citadel (BS); Catholic University (LLB)

Military service
- Allegiance: United States of America
- Branch/service: United States Marine Corps
- Years of service: 1943–1975
- Rank: Lieutenant General
- Commands: 7th Marine Regiment
- Battles/wars: World War II; Vietnam War
- Awards: Navy Distinguished Service Medal; Legion of Merit (4)

Herbert L. Beckington (October 3, 1920 – October 14, 2007) was a United States Marine Corps lieutenant general who served in combat during World War II and the Vietnam War. He later served as the first inspector general for the United States Agency for International Development.

== Biography ==
Herbert Beckington was born in Rockford, Illinois. He graduated from Rockford High School in 1938. He received his B.A. degree from The Citadel in 1943, and his LLB (Law) from Catholic University, Washington, D. C., in 1953.

Upon graduation from The Citadel, he was commissioned a Marine Corps Reserve second lieutenant on May 29, 1943. He completed the Reserve Officers' Class, Marine Corps Schools, Quantico, Virginia, in August 1943 and the Officers' Base Defense School at Camp Lejeune, North Carolina, the following November. He was promoted to first lieutenant in December 1944 and integrated into the regular Marine Corps in 1946.

His first duty assignment was as a battery officer with the 18th Defense Battalion at Camp Lejeune. In April 1944, First Lieutenant Beckington became a platoon commander and, later a battery executive officer and battery commander with the *18th Antiaircraft Artillery Battalion. From June 1944 until January 1946, he served with the battalion on Tinian and Saipan in the Pacific. Returning to the United States with the battalion in February of that year, he remained with the unit until March 1946.

Later completion of Sea School at Marine Corps Base, San Diego, California, in June 1946, Lieutenant Beckington became commanding officer of the Marine detachment aboard USS Helena (CA-75), and served in this capacity until October 1948. He was promoted to captain in August of that year.

Captain Beckington next saw duty at the Marine barracks in Norfolk, Virginia, until August 1950, then became a student, Postgraduate Law Course at Catholic University. While attending Catholic University, he served in the Office of the Judge Advocate General of the Navy and was promoted to major in June 1952.

Following graduation in 1953, he was assigned duty at the Marine Corps Base Camp Pendleton, California, until January 1955, then he was reassigned duty as Staff Secretary, 3rd Marine Division, and later, Secretary of the General Staff, Provisional Corps, Japan, and Battalion, S-3, 3rd Tank Battalion, 3rd Marine Division.

Major Beckington returned to the United States in February 1956, and was assigned as a member, Board For Data Processing Requirements of the Marine Corps, Headquarters Marine Corps until July 1957. He completed the Amphibious Warfare School, Junior Course, Quantico in June 1958, then returned to Headquarters Marine Corps for duty as assistant to the legislative assistant to the Commandant of the Marine Corps.

Promoted lieutenant colonel in October 1959, he was detached from Headquarters Marine Corps in July 1961 and assumed duty for one year as special assistant to the Assistant Secretary of the Navy (Installations and Logistics), Navy Department.

Lieutenant Colonel Beckington returned to Camp Lejeune in July 1962 and served, consecutively, as a battalion commander, 2nd Anti-tank Battalion, executive officer, Eighth Marines, 2nd Marine Division, and as assistant chief of staff, G-3, Force Troops. This was followed by duty from March 1965 until September 1967 as Military Aide to the Vice President of the United States, the Vice President Hubert H. Humphrey. He earned his first Legion of Merit during this assignment, and was promoted to colonel in September 1965.

Ordered to the Republic of Vietnam, he served initially as assistant chief of staff, G-5, 1st Marine Division, as assistant chief of staff, G-2, ITT Marine Amphibious Force, and again with the 1st Marine Division, as commanding officer of the 7th Marines. For his Vietnam service, he earned his second and third Legion of Merit with Combat "V".

Upon his return to the United States in February 1969, Colonel Beckington served briefly as chief of the Academic Department, Education Center, Quantico. In April, he returned to Headquarters Marine Corps for duty in the Policy Analysis Division.

Beckington was promoted to brigadier general on August 15, 1969, and was reassigned duty as assistant director, and later, deputy director of personnel and was awarded his fourth award of the Legion of Merit.

From November 1971 until August 1972, General Beckington was the assistant commander, 2nd Marine Division, Camp Lejeune.

Reporting to Headquarters Marine Corps in August 1972, he was promoted to major general and assigned as assistant deputy chief of staff (plans) and director, Joint Planning Group. On July 1, 1973, he assumed the duties as deputy chief of staff (plans and programs) and was promoted to lieutenant general. Due to a reorganization of Headquarters Marine Corps, he was reassigned as deputy chief of staff, plans and operations, in October 1973.

Beckington retired from active duty on September 1, 1975, and was awarded the Distinguished Service Medal upon his retirement.

In 1977, Beckington took the position of inspector general for the United States Agency for International Development.

Beckington died in Alexandria, Virginia, in October 2007.
