= Operation Eagle Claw =

Failed 1980 American military operation in Iran

- Part of the Iran hostage crisis
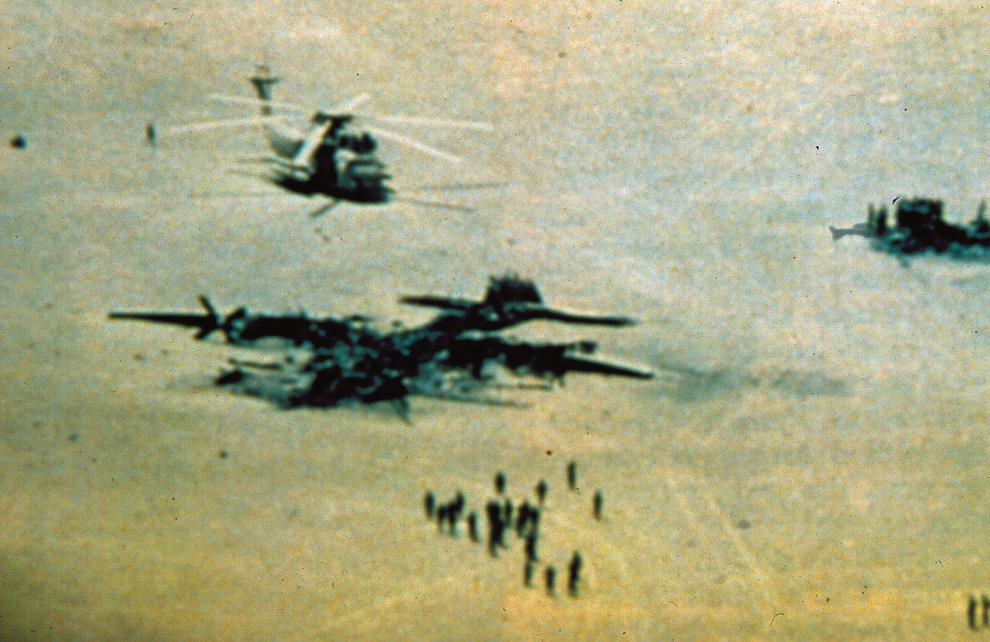
- Overview of the wreckage at the Desert One landing field in Iran
- Location: Near Tabas, South Khorasan, Iran; 33°04′23″N 55°53′33″E
- Commanded by: Jimmy Carter; James B. Vaught; James H. Kyle; Edward R. Seiffert; Charles Alvin Beckwith; Howard Hart
- Target: Embassy of the United States, Tehran
- Objective: Rescue of US hostages
- Date: 24–25 April 1980
- Executed by: United States Army: Delta Force; US Army Rangers; 1st Ranger Battalion; C Company; United States Army Special Forces Detachment A; United States Air Force: Brand X (24th Special Tactics Squadron); Central Intelligence Agency: Special Activities Division; Logistical support: United States Air Force; United States Marine Corps; United States Navy
- Outcome: Mission failed 1 helicopter and 1 transport aircraft destroyed 6 helicopters abandoned/captured
- Casualties: 8 US servicemen killed & 4 injured 1 Iranian civilian (alleged by Iranian Army) killed

Desert 1 location in central Iran

Operation Eagle Claw (Persian: عملیات پنجه عقاب) was a failed United States Department of Defense attempt to rescue 52 embassy staff held captive by Revolutionary Iran on 24 April 1980. It was ordered by U.S. president Jimmy Carter after the staff were seized at the Embassy of the United States, Tehran. The operation, one of Delta Force's first, encountered many obstacles and failures and was subsequently aborted. Eight helicopters were sent to the first staging area in Great Salt Desert called Desert One, but only five arrived in operational condition. One had encountered hydraulic problems, another was caught in a sand storm, and the third showed signs of a cracked rotor blade. During the operational planning, it was decided that the mission would be aborted if fewer than six helicopters remained operational upon arrival at the Desert One site, despite only four being absolutely necessary. The field commanders advised President Carter to abort the mission, which he did.

As the US forces prepared to withdraw from Desert One, one of the remaining helicopters crashed into a transport aircraft that contained both servicemen and jet fuel. The resulting fire destroyed both aircraft and killed eight servicemen. In the context of the Iranian Revolution, Iran's new leader, Ayatollah Ruhollah Khomeini, stated that the mission had been stopped by an act of God ("agents of God") who had foiled the US mission in order to protect Iran and its new Islamist government. In turn, Carter blamed his loss in the 1980 US presidential election mainly on his failure to secure the release of the hostages. The American hostages were released the day of Ronald Reagan's inauguration.

== Motivation for military intervention ==
On 4 November 1979, fifty-two American diplomats and citizens were taken hostage in the United States Embassy in Tehran, Iran, by a group of Iranian college students belonging to the Muslim Student Followers of the Imam's Line, avid supporters of the Iranian Revolution. U.S. president Jimmy Carter called the hostage-taking an act of "blackmail" and the hostages "victims of terrorism and anarchy". In Iran the hostage-taking was widely seen as an act against the US and its influence in Iran, including its perceived attempts to undermine the Iranian Revolution, along with the US's longstanding support of the Shah of Iran, Mohammad Reza Pahlavi, who was overthrown in 1979.

The crisis had reached a climax after diplomatic negotiations failed to secure the release of the hostages. Facing elections and with little to show from negotiations, the Carter government ordered the State Department to sever diplomatic relations with Iran on 7 April 1980. Cyrus Vance, the United States Secretary of State, had argued against a push by National Security Advisor Zbigniew Brzezinski for a military solution to the crisis. Vance left Washington on Thursday 10 April for a long weekend vacation in Florida. The following day, Friday 11 April, Brzezinski held a newly scheduled meeting of the National Security Council where he insisted that it was time to "lance the boil", and Carter said it was "time for us to bring our hostages home". During this Security Council meeting of 11 April Carter confirmed that he had authorized the mission. (Note: Deputy Secretary Warren Christopher, who attended the meeting in Vance's place, did not inform Vance. Furious that the meeting had been held and the decision made in his absence, Vance handed in his resignation on principle, calling Brzezinski "evil".) He also continued to entertain the planning for a concurrent punitive air-strike, but this was finally rejected on 23 April, one day before the start of the mission, which was code-named Operation Eagle Claw.

Operation Eagle Claw occurred amid a breakdown in diplomatic relations between Iran and its western neighbor Iraq, including frequent border skirmishes, calls by Khomeini for Iraqi Shi'ites to revolt against the ruling Ba'ath Party, and allegations of Iraqi support for Arab and Kurdish separatists in Iran. According to an 11 April 1980 Central Intelligence Agency (CIA) analysis, "Evidence indicates that Iraq had probably planned to initiate a major military move against Iran with the aim of toppling the Khomeini regime" and had "sought to engage the Kuwaitis to act as intermediary in obtaining United States approval and support for Iraqi military action against Iran". Carter, who wrote in his diary on 10 April that "The Iranian terrorists are making all kinds of crazy threats to kill the American hostages if they are invaded by Iraq—whom they identify as an American puppet," may have been influenced by such reports to approve a rescue mission prior to the outbreak of a possible Iran–Iraq War.

== Planning and preparation ==
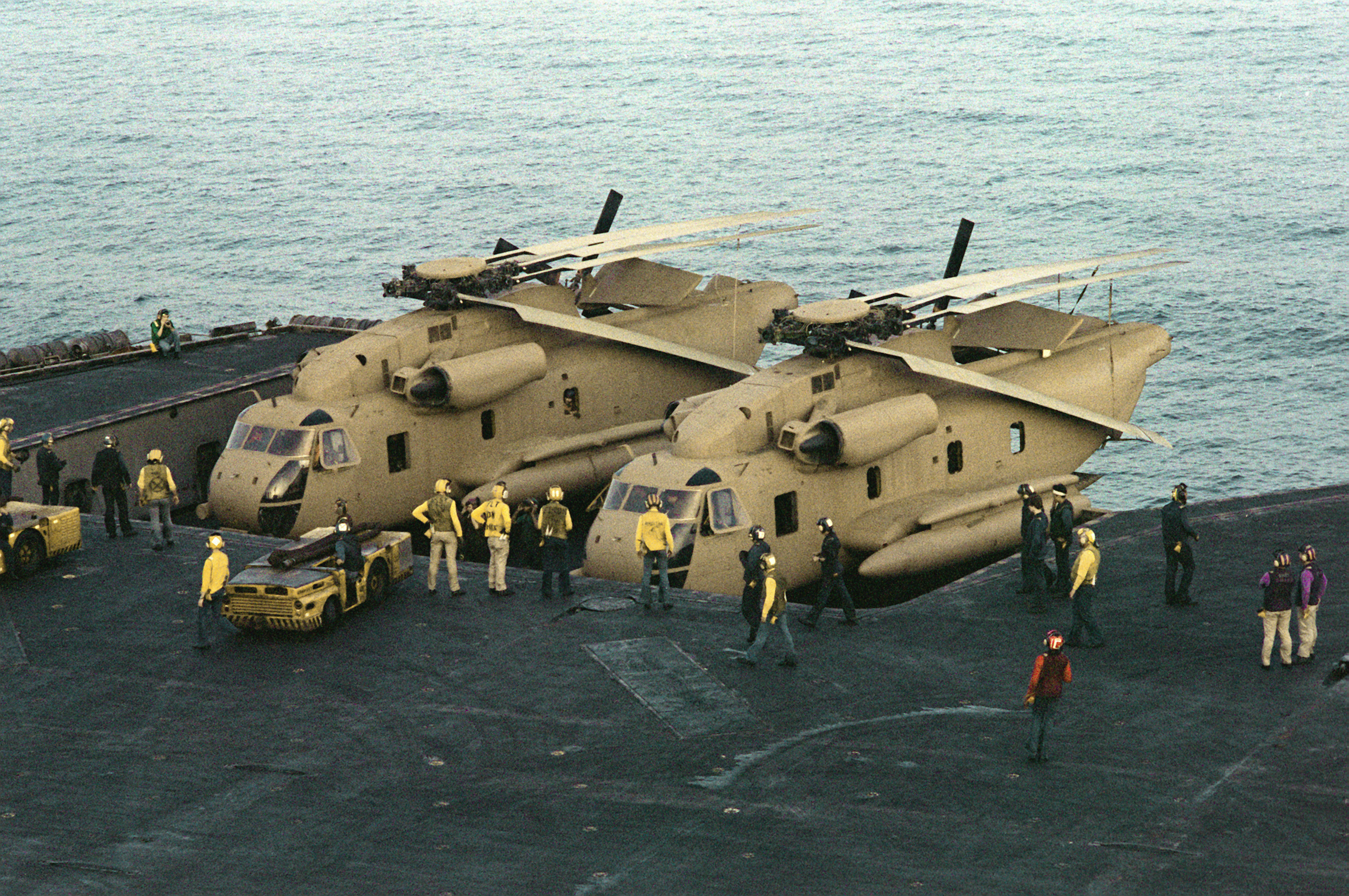
A pair of RH-53Ds aboard USS Nimitz as part of Operation Eagle Claw

Planning for a possible rescue mission began on 6 November, two days after the hostages were taken. Army Major General James B. Vaught was appointed as Joint Task Force commander and was to be forward-based at Wadi Kena in Egypt, reporting directly to the President. In turn, he had two field commanders: USAF Colonel James H. Kyle as the field commander for aviation and US Army Colonel Charlie Beckwith as ground forces field commander. In planning the operation, some of the maps the US used were tourist maps.

The plan was designed so all four main services of the Department of Defense would have a part: Army, Navy, Air Force and the Marine Corps. It was planned that helicopters and C-130 aircraft, following different routes, would rendezvous on a salt flat (code-named Desert One) 200 miles (320 km) southeast of Tehran. Here the helicopters would refuel from the C-130s and pick up the combat troops who had flown in on the C-130 transports. The helicopters would then transport the troops to a mountain location (Desert Two) closer to Tehran, from which the rescue raid would be launched into the city the following night. The operation was further to be supported by an in-country CIA team. On completion of the raid, hostages were to be taken to a captured Tehran airport from where they were to be flown to Egypt.

On 31 March, anticipating the need for military action, a US Air Force Combat Controller, Major John T. Carney Jr., was flown in a Twin Otter to Desert One by covert CIA operatives Jim Rhyne and Claude "Bud" McBroom for a clandestine survey of the proposed landing areas for the helicopters and C-130s. Carney installed remotely operated infrared lights and an IR strobe to outline a landing pattern for the pilots. He also took soil samples to determine the load-bearing properties of the desert surface. At the time of the survey, the salt-flat floor was hard-packed sand, but in the ensuing three weeks an ankle-deep layer of powdery sand had been deposited by sandstorms.

The Tehran CIA Special Activities Division in-country paramilitary team, led by retired US Army Special Forces officer Richard J. Meadows, had two assignments: to obtain information about the hostages and the embassy grounds (Note: In reality, the most important information came from an embassy cook released by the Iranians. He was discovered on a flight from Tehran at the last minute by another CIA officer, and confirmed that the hostages were centrally located in the embassy compound – this was a key piece of information long sought by the planners.) and to transport the rescue team from Desert Two to the embassy grounds in pre-staged vehicles. Desert One was in the South Khorasan Province, in the Dasht-e Lut desert near Tabas (33°04′23″N 55°53′33″E); Desert Two was located 50 miles (80 km) short of Tehran at 35°14′N 52°09′E. A small advance force infiltrated Tehran and secured a warehouse where five Ford trucks and two Mazda vans with facade compartments that would conceal the assaulters as they went through Iranian checkpoints were kept.

=== Assault teams ===
Planned and actual routes for Operation Eagle Claw

The ground forces consisted of 93 Delta soldiers to assault the embassy and a 13-man special forces assault team from Detachment A to assault the Ministry of Foreign Affairs where three further hostages were being held. A third group of 12 Rangers were to act as the roadblock team at the Desert One landing area. Rangers were also tasked with taking and holding the Manzariyeh Air Base near Tehran to be used to escape from Iran. In addition, the CIA had prepared an in-country team of 15 Iranian and American Persian-speakers, most of whom would act as truck drivers.

=== Ingress ===
The complex plan required that on the first night, three USAF EC-130s (Call signs: Republic 4, 5, and 6), carrying the logistical supplies, and three MC-130E Combat Talons (Call signs: Dragon 1, 2, and 3), carrying Delta Force and Ranger troops (132 assault and security troops in total), would depart Masirah, off the coast of Oman, for Desert One, a flight of over 1,000 miles (1,600 km). They would be refueled by Air Force KC-135 tankers en route. Desert One would be secured by a protection force, and once secured, a refueling area would be established for the helicopters with approximately 6,000 US gallons (23,000 L) of jet fuel being made available from collapsible fuel bladders carried in the C-130s.

Eight United States Navy (USN) RH-53D Sea Stallion (Call signs: Bluebeard 1 – 8) helicopters were positioned aboard USS Nimitz, 60 miles (100 km) off the coast of Iran. The helicopters would fly 600 miles (1,000 km) to Desert One, refuel, load up the Delta Force and part of the Ranger teams, then fly 260 miles (420 km) further to Desert Two. As it would be close to morning, the helicopters and ground forces would hide during the day at Desert Two. The rescue operation would take place the second night.

=== Rescue raid ===
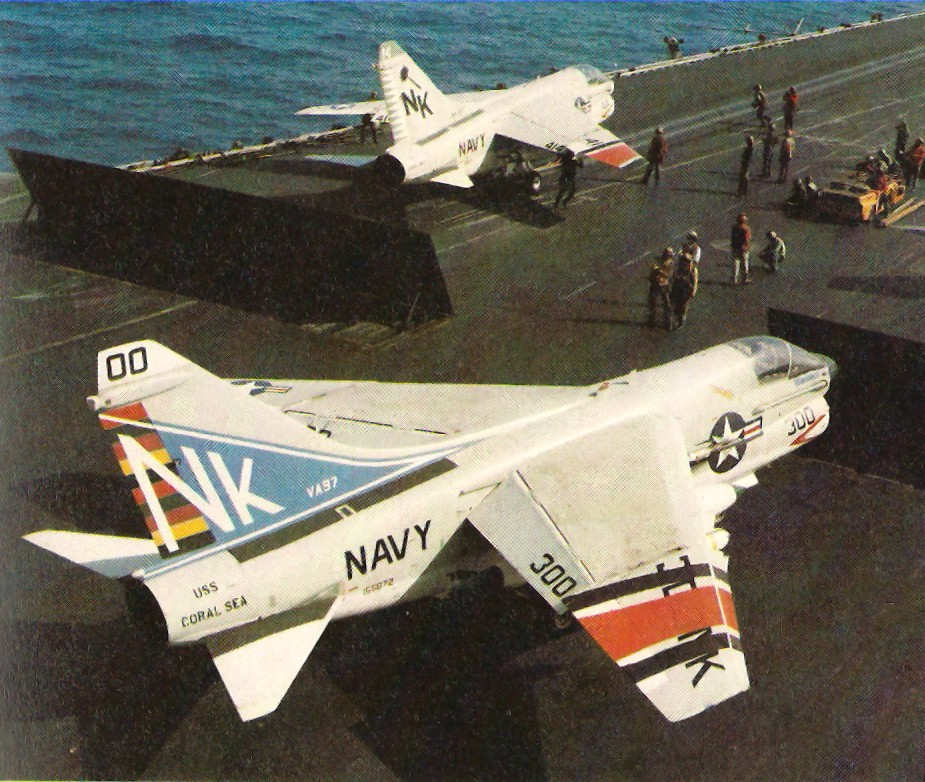
A-7Es aboard Coral Sea with special identification stripes added specifically for Operation Eagle Claw

First, CIA officers who were already inside Iran would bring trucks they had sourced to Desert Two. Together, the CIA officers and ground forces would then drive from Desert Two into Tehran. This team would assault the embassy and Foreign Affairs building, eliminate the guards, and rescue the hostages, with air support from Air Force AC-130 gunships flying from Desert One. The hostages and rescue team would then rendezvous with the helicopters from Desert Two at the nearby Amjadieh Stadium, where the hostages and rescue teams would board the helicopters.

=== Egress ===
In parallel to the rescue, an Army Ranger company would capture the abandoned Manzariyeh Air Base, (34°58′58″N 50°48′20″E) about 60 miles (100 km) southwest of Tehran, to allow two C-141 Starlifters to arrive from Saudi Arabia. The helicopters would bring all parties from the stadium to the Manzariyeh airbase, and the C-141s would fly them to an airbase in Egypt. The eight helicopters would be destroyed before departure.

=== Protection and support ===
Protection for the operation was to be provided by Carrier Air Wing Eight (CVW-8) operating from Nimitz and CVW-14 operating from USS Coral Sea. For this operation, the aircraft bore special invasion stripe identification on their right wings. This was necessary to distinguish support aircraft from Iranian F-14 and F-4 aircraft purchased by Iran from the US in the time of the Shah. CVW-14 Marine F-4Ns were marked with a red (VMFA-323) or yellow (VMFA-531) stripe enclosed by two black stripes while CVW-14 attack aircraft (A-7s and A-6s) had an orange stripe enclosed by two black stripes.

== The mission ==
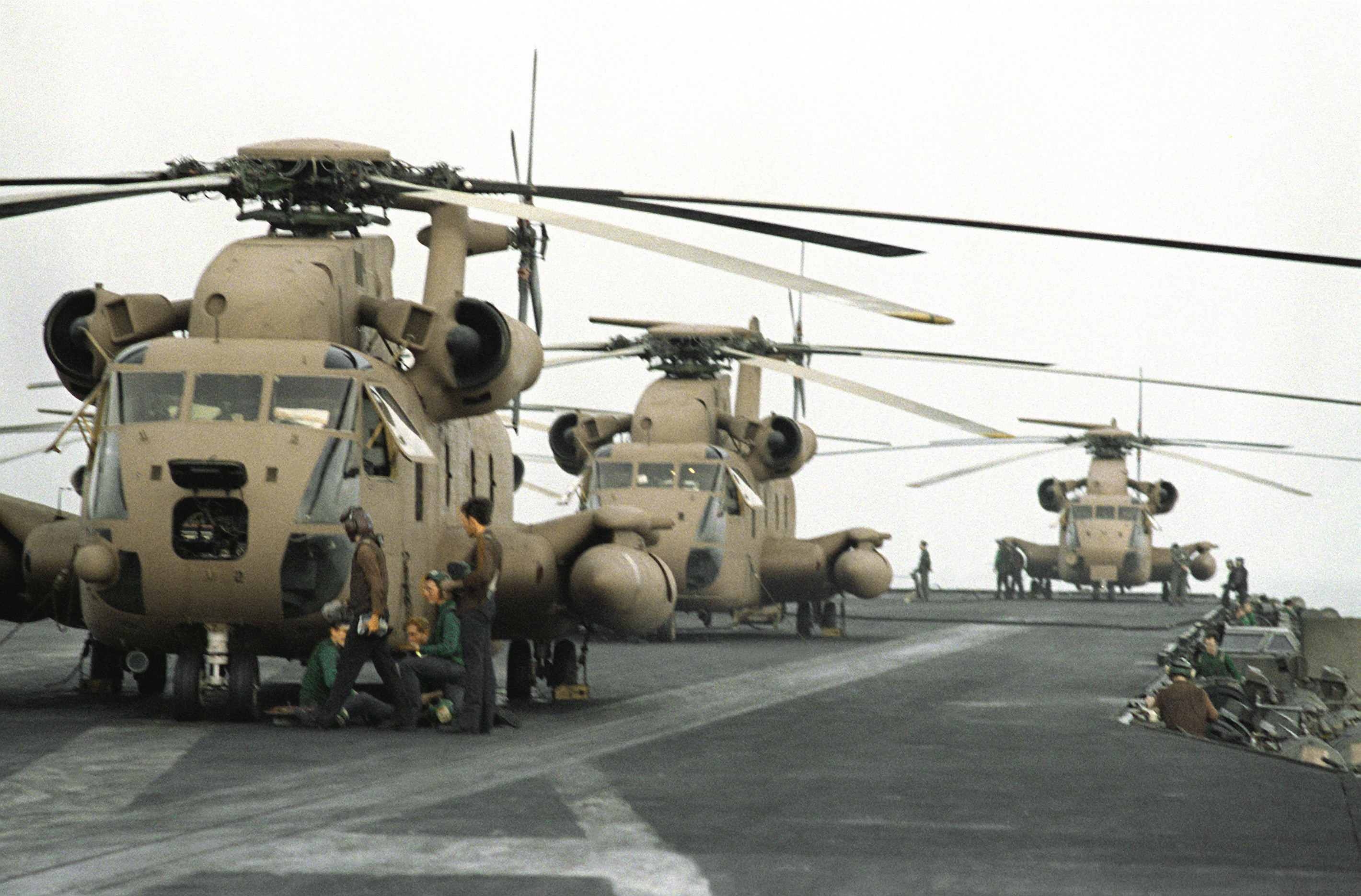
Repainted Bluebeard RH-53D helicopters in sand camouflage and without markings aboard USS Nimitz

Only the delivery of the soldiers, equipment and fuel by the C-130 aircraft went according to plan. MC-130 Dragon 1 landed at Desert One at 22:47 local time. The landing was made under blacked-out conditions using the improvised infrared landing light system installed by Carney on the airstrip, visible only through night vision goggles. The heavily loaded Dragon 1 required four passes to determine that there were no obstructions on the airstrip (Note: This was done by use of a Forward looking infrared (FLIR) pass before attempting to land.) and to align with the runway. Dragon 1 off-loaded the road-watch teams in Jeeps and a USAF Combat Control Team (CCT) to establish a parallel landing zone north of the dirt road and to set out TACAN beacons to guide in the helicopters.

Soon after the first crews landed and began securing Desert One, a civilian Iranian bus with a driver and 43 passengers was stopped while traveling on the road, which now served as the runway for the aircraft. The bus was forced to halt by the Rangers and the passengers were detained aboard Dragon 3. (Note: It was originally planned to simulate a head-on accident between the tanker and the bus, flying the bus passengers out of Iran aboard Dragon 3 and then returning them to Manzaniyeh on the second night.) Minutes after the bus had been stopped, the Rangers in the road-watch team observed a fuel tanker truck, ignoring their orders to halt, bearing down on them. The truck, apparently smuggling fuel, was blown up by the Army Ranger roadblock team using a shoulder-fired rocket as it tried to escape the site. The truck's passenger was killed, but the driver managed to escape in an accompanying pickup truck. As the tanker truck was thought to be engaged in clandestine smuggling, the driver was not considered to pose a security threat to the mission. The resulting fire illuminated the nighttime landscape for many miles around, and provided a visual guide to Desert One for the disoriented incoming helicopters.

Two hours into the flight, RH-53D Bluebeard 6 made an emergency landing in the desert when a sensor indicated a cracked rotor blade. (Note: A Blade Inspection Method, or BIM, warning light came on in the cockpit which warned of a possible leak of the pressurized nitrogen that filled the Sea Stallion's hollow rotors. In the H-53 models that the Marine pilots were accustomed to flying, the BIM indicator meant a crack in one of the massive blades, which had caused rotor failures and several fatal crashes in the past. As a result, Marine H-53 pilots were trained to land immediately after a BIM warning. However, the Navy's RH-53s had newer BIM systems that usually did not foretell a fatal blade failure and no RH-53s had experienced a blade break. Unknown to the Marine pilots, the manufacturer had determined that the helicopter could fly safely for up to 79 hours at reduced speed after a BIM alert.) Its crew was picked up by Bluebeard 8 and the aircraft was abandoned in the desert. The remaining helicopters ran into an unexpected weather phenomenon known as a haboob (an enormous, nearly opaque cloud of fine dust). Bluebeard 5 flew into the haboob, but abandoned the mission and returned to the Nimitz when electrical problems disabled flight instruments and flying without visual references proved impossible. The remaining six helicopters reached Desert One, 50 to 90 minutes behind schedule. Bluebeard 2 arrived last at Desert One at 01:00 with a malfunctioning secondary hydraulic system, leaving only one hydraulic system to control the aircraft.

With only five fully serviceable helicopters now remaining to transport the men and equipment to Desert Two (minimum of six aircraft was the planned mission's abort threshold), the various commanders reached a stalemate. Senior helicopter pilot Seiffert refused to use unsafe Bluebeard 2 on the mission, while Beckwith (field commander for ground forces) refused to consider reducing his trained rescue team's size. Kyle (the field aviation commander), therefore, recommended to Vaught that the mission be aborted. The recommendation was passed on by satellite radio to the president. After two and a half hours on the ground, the presidential abort confirmation was received.

== Collision and fire ==
Plan sketch of Desert One

Fuel consumption calculations showed that the extra 90 minutes idling on the ground waiting for the abort confirmation order had made fuel critical for one of the EC-130s. When it became clear that only six helicopters would arrive at Desert One, Kyle had authorized the EC-130s to transfer 1,000 US gallons (3,800 L) from the bladders to their own main fuel tanks, but Republic 4 had already expended all of its bladder fuel refueling three of the helicopters and had none to transfer. To make it to the air tanker refueling track without running out of fuel, it had to leave immediately and was already loaded with part of the Delta team. In addition, RH-53D Bluebeard 4 needed additional fuel, requiring it to be moved to the opposite side of the road.

To accomplish both actions, Bluebeard 3 piloted by Maj. James Schaefer had to be moved from directly behind the EC-130. The aircraft could not be moved by ground taxi and had to be moved by hover taxi (flying a short distance at low speed and altitude). (Note: Either because of a deflated nose gear tire, because of the layer of soft sand, or both. It had originally been positioned behind the EC-130 by a flight technique in which its nose gear was held off the ground while it rolled on its main gear.) A combat controller attempted to direct the maneuver from in front of the aircraft but was blasted by desert sand churned up by the rotor. The controller attempted to back away, which led Bluebeard 3's pilot to mistakenly perceive that his craft was drifting backward (engulfed in a dust cloud, the pilot only had the controller as a point of reference) and thus attempted to correct this situation by applying forward stick to maintain the same distance from the rearward moving marshaller. The RH-53D struck the EC-130's vertical stabilizer with its main rotor and crashed into the EC-130's wing root.

In the ensuing explosion and fire, eight servicemen died: five of the fourteen USAF aircrew in the EC-130, and three of the five USMC aircrew in the RH-53D, with only the helicopter's pilot and co-pilot (both badly burned) surviving. (Note: The five US airmen killed were Major Richard L. Bakke, Navigator; Major Harold L Lewis Jr., Pilot & Aircraft Commander; TSgt Joel C. Mayo, Flight Engineer; Major Lyn D. McIntosh, Co-Pilot; and Captain Charles T. McMillan, Navigator. The three US Marine fatalities were Sgt John D. Harvey, Cpl George N. Holmes Jr., and SSgt Dewey L Johnson, the three of them were Marine helicopter crewmen and riflemen. USMC Majors Jim Schaefer, pilot, and Les Petty, co-pilot, were casualties.) After the crash, it was decided to abandon the helicopters. During the frantic evacuation to the EC-130s by the helicopter crews, unsuccessful attempts were made to retrieve their classified mission documents and destroy the aircraft. The helicopter crews boarded the EC-130s. Five RH-53D aircraft were left behind at Desert One mostly intact, some damaged by shrapnel. They could not be destroyed because they were loaded with ammunition and any fire or explosion would have endangered the EC-130s.

The EC-130s carried the remaining forces back to the intermediate airfield at Masirah Island, where two C-141 medical evacuation aircraft from the staging base at Wadi Abu Shihat, Egypt, (Note: Referred to as Wadi Kena by the US forces due to its location near Qena, 26°33′18″N 33°07′58″E)) picked up the injured personnel, helicopter crews, Rangers, and Delta Force members, and returned to Wadi Kena. The injured were then transported to Landstuhl Army Regional Medical Center in Germany. The following day, after learning about the events at Desert One from the local Iranian news, the Tehran CIA team quietly left Iran, with the Iranians unaware of their presence.

== Aftermath ==
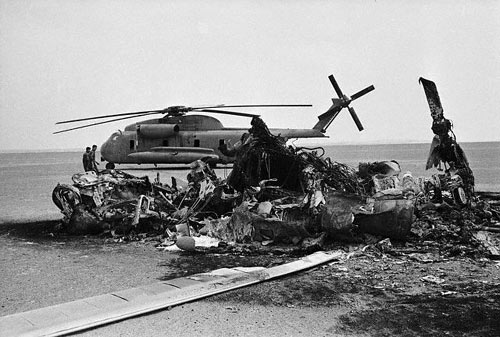
Wreckage of one of the destroyed Bluebeard helicopters with an abandoned RH-53D behind

The White House announced the failed rescue operation at 01:00 a.m. the following day (25 April 1980). Iranian Army investigators found eight bodies (eight Americans) and also alleged to have found the body of an Iranian civilian. However, it has been acknowledged that the fuel tank driver near the landing site who refused to stop, and whose tanker truck exploded after being hit by an anti-tank round, managed to leap from his vehicle and escape in a nearby pickup truck which was following; it was reported that the gas tank truck and a bus with 44 civilians were the vehicles which were stopped at the opposite ends of the dirt road near the Desert One landing site when the C-130 aircraft landed. Nine caskets were made, with Ayatollah Sadegh Khalkhali alleging that nine Americans were killed. The American bodies, which were acknowledged to have been numbered at eight, were returned to the United States on 6 May 1980, and buried at various locations across the country. The 44 Iranian civilians taken prisoner on the bus were released and subsequently gave eyewitness accounts of the operation.

=== Casualties ===
The eight Americans who died included three Marines and five Air Force personnel. On 25 April 1980, Major General Robert M. Bond read a message from President Jimmy Carter at a memorial service commemorating them in Niceville, Florida. A memorial honoring them was erected in the Arlington National Cemetery and Carter attended a memorial service there with the families on 9 May. Three of the servicemen who died – Maj. Richard Bakke, Maj. Harold Lewis Jr., and Sgt. Joel Mayo – were buried in Arlington National Cemetery in a grave marked by a common headstone, located about 25 feet from the group memorial.

After the termination of the operation and the abandonment of equipment by the infiltration team, the Iranians became aware of the landings as well as the subsequent accident and fire. Mohammad Montazer al-Qaim, commander of the Yazd Iranian Revolutionary Guards Corps (IRGC) went to the scene to investigate reports from locals. At the same time, without knowing of the investigation activities of the IRGC, the Iranian Air Force conducted two observation flights over the incident area. During the first flight, two F-14s flew over the abandoned US equipment and the flight requested permission to fire on the equipment. This was refused by the Iranian command. The next day, Iranian Air Force F-4 fighter jets patrolling the area thought that the American helicopters were about to fly and they fired at the remaining American equipment with direct order from Abolhassan Banisadr (Iran's president at the time) killing Mohammad Montazer al-Qaim, an IRGC commander responsible for securing the site.

=== Political consequences ===
President Carter continued to attempt to secure the hostages' release before the end of his presidency. On 20 January 1981, minutes after Carter's term ended, the 52 US captives held in Iran were released, ending the 444-day Iran hostage crisis. US Secretary of State Cyrus R. Vance, believing that the operation would not work and would only endanger the lives of the hostages, opted to resign, regardless of whether the mission was successful or not. His resignation was confirmed several days later.

Ruhollah Khomeini condemned Jimmy Carter, and in a speech after the incident, credited God with protecting Iran. He said:

"Who crushed Mr. Carter's helicopters? We did? The sands did! They were God's agents. Wind is God's agent ... These sands are agents of God. They can try again!"

The embassy hostages were subsequently scattered across Iran to preclude any second rescue attempt and were released on 20 January 1981, minutes after Ronald Reagan had taken the oath of office after having defeated Carter in the 1980 election.

=== Investigation and recommendations ===
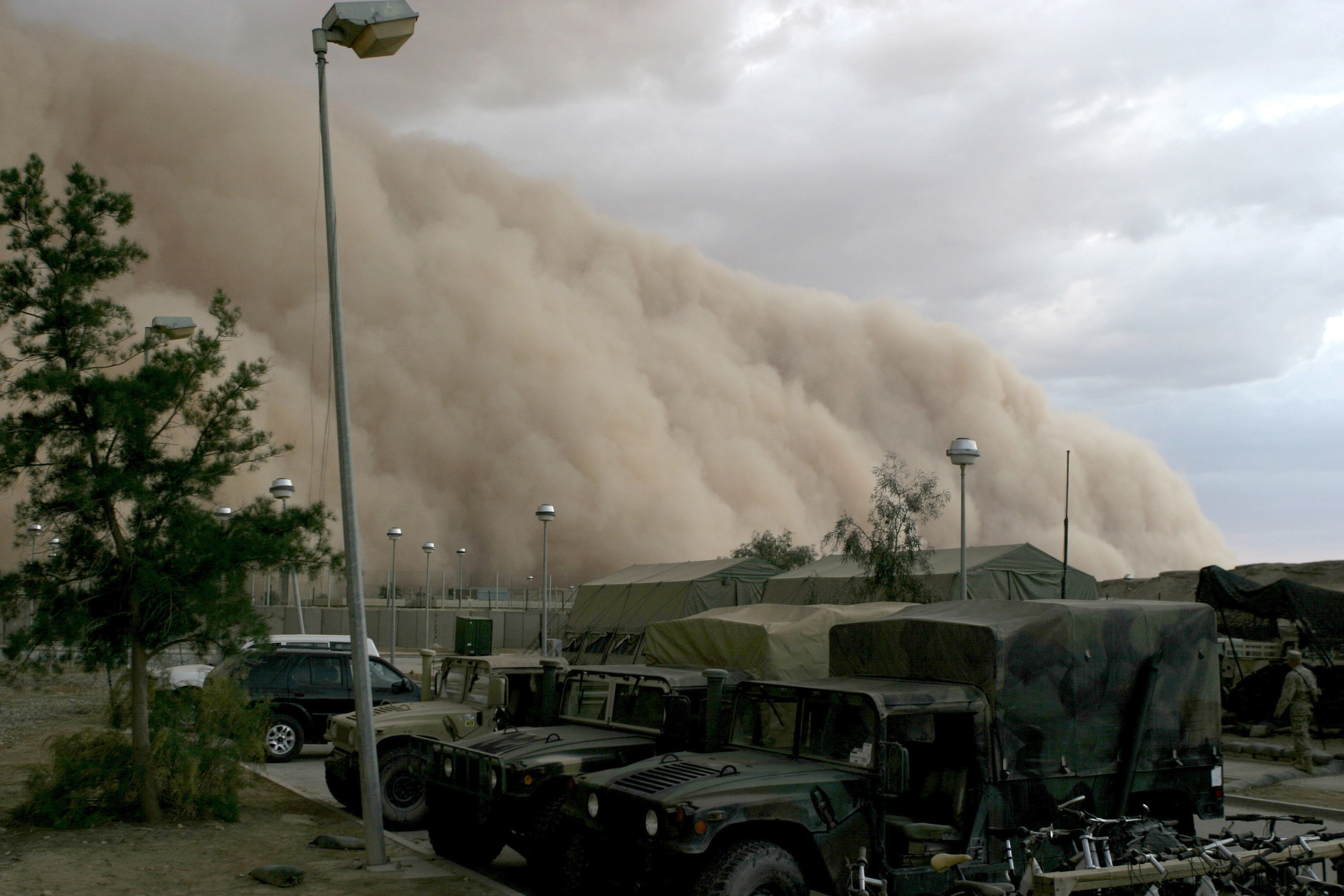
Example of a haboob, one of the factors that influenced the outcome of the operation

Retired Chief of Naval Operations Admiral James L. Holloway III led the official investigation in 1980 into the causes of the operation's failure on behalf of the Joint Chiefs of Staff. The Holloway Report primarily cited deficiencies in mission planning, command and control, and inter-service operability, and provided a catalyst to reorganize the Department of Defense.

==== Creation of the USSOCOM ====
The various services' failure to cohesively work together prompted the establishment of a new multi-service organization several years later. The United States Special Operations Command (USSOCOM) became operational on 16 April 1987. Each service now has its own special operations forces under USSOCOM's overall control. (Note: For example, the Army has its own special operations command, which controls its special operations forces. The USAF special operations units that supplied the rescue attempt's MC-130 elements were awarded the Air Force Outstanding Unit Award for both that year and the next, had the initial squadron of nine HH-53 Pave Low helicopters transferred from Military Airlift Command to its jurisdiction for long-range low-level night flying operations, and became co-hosts at its home base of Hurlburt Field with Air Force Special Operations Command.)

==== Creation of the SOAR ====
The lack of well-trained Army helicopter pilots who were capable of the low-level night flying needed for modern special operations missions prompted the creation of the 160th Special Operations Aviation Regiment (SOAR) (Night Stalkers). In addition to the 160th SOAR's creation, the US Defense Department now trains many military helicopter pilots in low-level penetration, aerial refueling, and use of night-vision goggles. In addition to the formal report, various reasons for the mission failure have been argued, with most analysts agreeing that an excessively complex plan, poor operational planning, flawed command structure, lack of adequate pilot training and poor weather conditions were contributing factors.

==== Creation of the JCU ====
The Joint Communications Unit (JCU) is a unit of the Joint Special Operations Command charged to standardize and ensure interoperability of the communication procedures and equipment of JSOC and its subordinate units. The JCU was created in 1980 after the failure of Eagle Claw. Its headquarters are in Fort Bragg, North Carolina.

== Units involved in the operation ==
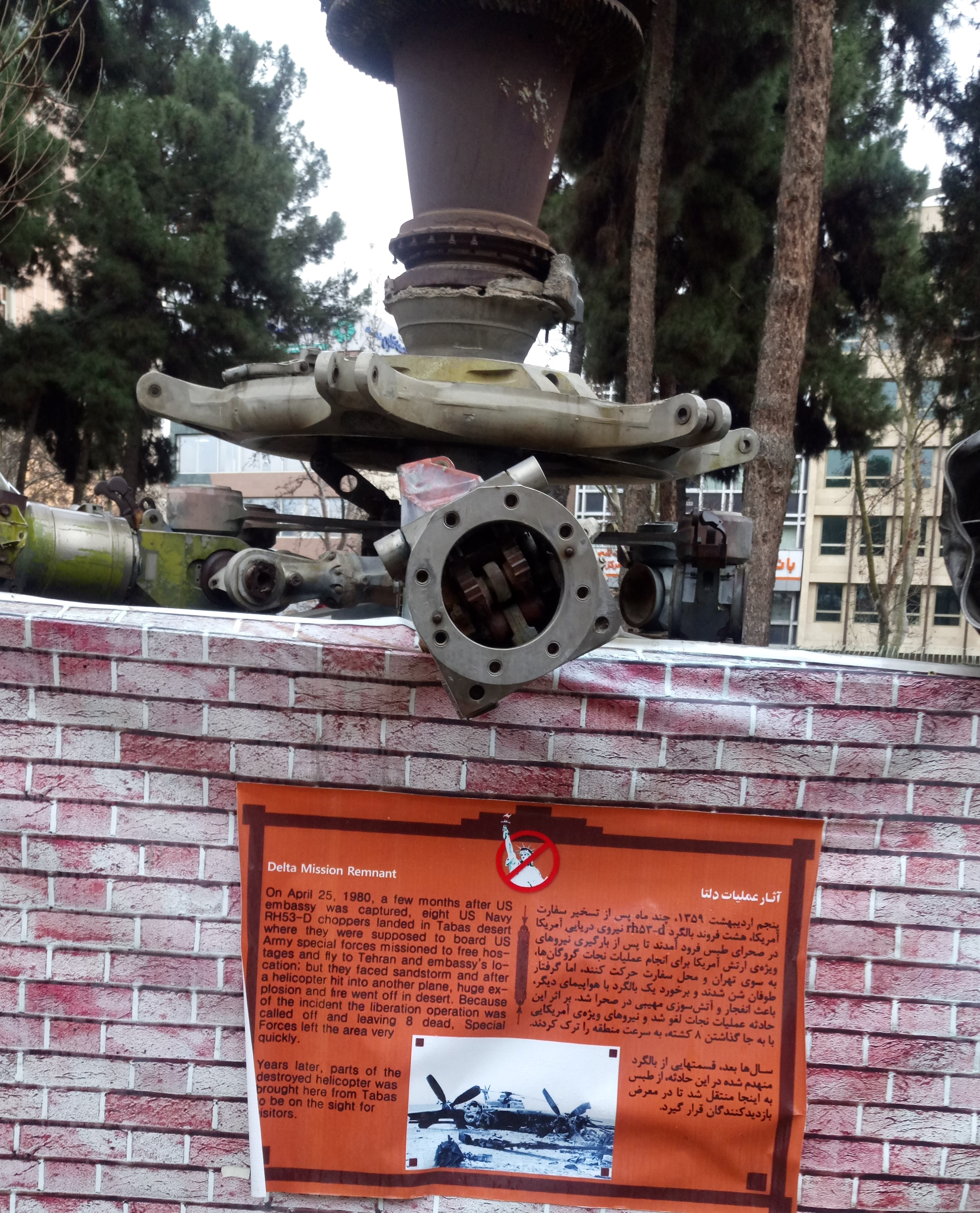
RH-53D helicopter rotor remnant from Operation Eagle Claw on display in the former US Embassy in Tehran

=== CIA ===
- Special Activities Division/Special Operations Group (SAD/SOG)

=== US Air Force ===
- 1st Special Operations Wing: 8th Special Operations Squadron (EC-130)
- 436th Military Airlift Wing
- 437th Military Airlift Wing
- 438th Military Airlift Wing
- 322d Airlift Division

=== US Army ===
- 1st Special Forces Operational Detachment-Delta ("Delta Force")
- 10th Special Forces Group Special Forces Detachment "A"
- 75th Infantry Regiment (elements from 1st and 2nd Ranger Battalions)

=== US Navy and Marine Corps ===
- USS Nimitz (CVN-68) with Carrier Air Wing 8
- USS Coral Sea (CV-43) with Carrier Air Wing 14
- USS California (CGN-36)
- USS Gridley (CG-21)
- USS Okinawa (LPH-3)
- USS Alamo (LSD-33)
- USS Newport (LST-1179)
- USS San Bernardino (LST-1189)
- USS Mobile (LKA-115)
- USS Barbey (FF-1088)
- USS William H. Standley (CG-32)
- USS Texas (CGN-39)
- USS Davidson (FF-1045)
- USS Flint (AE-32) was also present with USS Coral Sea as well as other support ships.

== Commemoration ==
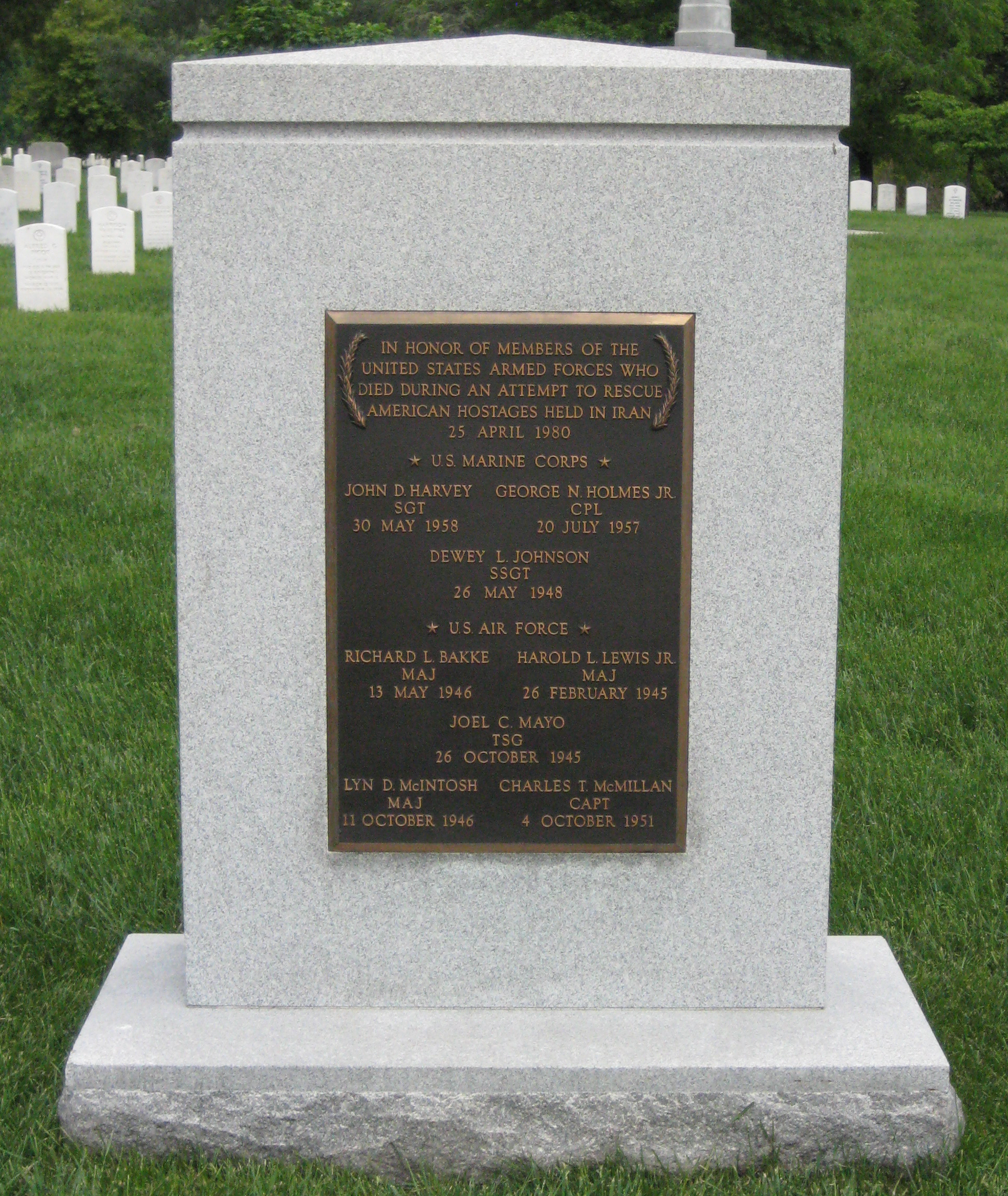
Operation Eagle Claw Memorial in Arlington National Cemetery

=== United States ===
The official Operation Eagle Claw Memorial is at Arlington National Cemetery and is described by cemetery literature thusly:

Dedicated in 1983, the Iran Rescue Mission Memorial consists of a white marble column with a bronze plaque listing the names and ranks of those who lost their lives during the mission.

=== Iran ===
The incident is considered as a US defeat and is commemorated annually in Tabas where government officials, religious leaders and people gather and display wreckage of the American planes and helicopters from the incident. A mosque called "gratitude mosque" was built at the crash site. On the road from Ashkezar to Tabas, at the location of Desert One there are several remnants of the operation, including wreckage and mock-ups of the RH-53D helicopters.

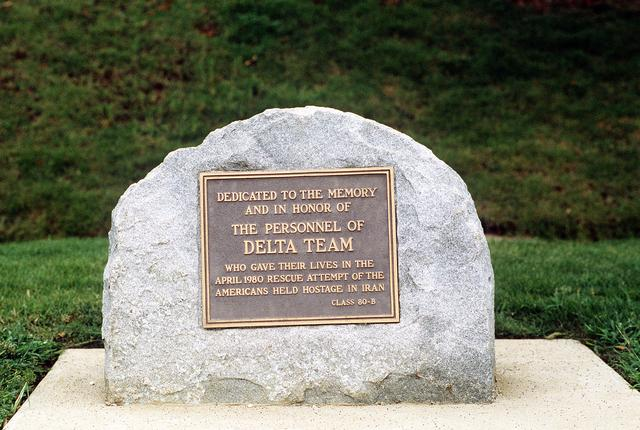
Commemoration for Delta Team casualties at Gunter Annex, Maxwell Air Force Base, Alabama

An Iranian air-defense system is named Tabas, in commemoration of the crash site. At the old Tehran Airport, there is the shell of a RH-53D airframe on display.

=== Aircraft ===
- The abandoned Bluebeards 2 and 8 were inducted into service with the Islamic Republic of Iran Navy.
- RH-53D Bluebeard 5 is immortalized at Wrightstown Gate Joint Base McGuire–Dix–Lakehurst, New Jersey
- EC-130E Republic 5 which returned successfully, was retired by the USAF in June 2013 and is now on display at the Carolinas Aviation Museum.

== Second rescue plan ==
Shortly after the first mission failed, planning for a second rescue mission was authorized under the name Project Honey Badger. Plans and exercises were conducted, but the manpower and aircraft requirements grew to involve nearly a battalion of troops, more than fifty aircraft, and such contingencies as transporting a 12-ton bulldozer to rapidly clear a blocked runway. Even though numerous rehearsal exercises were successful, the helicopters' failure during the first attempt resulted in the development of a subsequent concept involving only fixed-wing STOL aircraft capable of flying from the US to Iran using aerial refueling, then returning to land on an aircraft carrier for medical treatment of wounded.

The concept called Operation Credible Sport, was developed but never implemented. It called for a modified Hercules, the YMC-130H, outfitted with rocket thrusters fore and aft to allow an extremely short landing and take-off in Amjadieh Stadium. Three aircraft were modified under a rushed secret program. The first fully modified aircraft crashed during a demonstration at Duke Field at Eglin Air Force Base on 29 October 1980, when its landing braking rockets were fired too soon. The misfire caused a hard touchdown that tore off the starboard wing and started a fire. All on board survived without injury. The impending change of administration in the White House forced this project's abandonment.

== Popular culture ==
- "O Superman" (1981) – the song by Laurie Anderson "is directly related to" the incident.
- The Delta Force (1986) – a fictionalized retelling of the incident's "Desert One disaster" serves as the prologue, maintaining its "failed mission" narrative.
- Sand Storm (Persian: توفان شن), 1997 Iranian film directed by Javad Shamaghdari
- Argo (2012) makes reference to the operation and centres on the 1979 revolution
- "Ham Avaz-e Toofan" (Persian: هم‌آواز طوفان, "Singing with the Storm"), a 2014 song by Hamed Zamani
- Desert One, 2019 US documentary by Barbara Kopple about the operation
- This incident is referenced a few times in the G.I. Joe: A Real American Hero comic book, in particular as the source of the injuries sustained by the popular masked character Snake Eyes

== See also ==
- Canadian Caper – 1980 rescue of US diplomats from Iran
- 2026 U.S. pilot rescue operation in Iran, 2026 rescue of US F-15 crew members in Iran

== Notes and references ==
=== General and cited references ===
- Beckwith, Charlie A. (2000). Delta Force: The Army's Elite Counter Terrorist Unit. Avon. ISBN 0-380-80939-7.
- Bottoms, Mike (2007). "Carney receives Simons Award" (PDF). Tip of the Spear. United States Special Operations Command Public Affairs Office. pp. 26–31. Archived (PDF) from the original on 1 June 2016.
- Bowden, Mark (2006). Guests of the Ayatollah: The First Battle in America's War With Militant Islam. Atlantic Monthly Press. ISBN 0-87113-925-1.
- Carter, Jimmy (1 October 1982). Keeping Faith: Memoirs of a President. Bantam Books. ISBN 0-553-05023-0.
- Aeronautical Information Manual (PDF). Federal Aviation Administration. 2012. pp. 4–3–18. Archived from the original (PDF) on 5 March 2013.
- Gabriel, Richard A. (1985). Military Incompetence: Why the American Military Doesn't Win. Hill and Wang. ISBN 0-374-52137-9.
- Haney, Eric (2002). Inside Delta Force: The Story of America's Elite Counter Terrorist Unit. Random House. ISBN 0-385-33603-9.
- Kamps, Charles Tustin (2006). "Operation Eagle Claw: The Iran Hostage Rescue Mission". Air & Space Power Journal. Archived from the original on 2 April 2010.
- Ryan, Paul B. (1985). The Iranian Rescue Mission: Why It Failed. Annapolis: Naval Institute Press. ISBN 0-87021-321-0.
- Thigpen (2001). The Praetorian STARShip: The Untold Story of the Combat Talon. DIANE Publishing. ISBN 9781428990432.
