= The Boo =

1970 novel by Pat Conroy

- First edition cover
- Author: Pat Conroy
- Language: English
- Genre: Short stories/Memoirs etc
- Publisher: McClure Press
- Publication date: 1970
- Publication place: United States
- Media type: Print (hardback & paperback)
- Followed by: The Water is Wide

The Boo was the first book by writer Pat Conroy. Written when Conroy was newly graduated (1967) from The Citadel in 1970, it is a collection of letters, short stories, and anecdotes about Lt. Colonel Thomas "The Boo" Courvoisie. As Commandant of Cadets at the Citadel. Courvoisie was a friend and father figure to many of the college's cadets, including Conroy.
