= Thelma & Louise =

1991 film by Ridley Scott

- Theatrical release poster
- Directed by: Ridley Scott
- Written by: Callie Khouri
- Produced by: Ridley Scott; Mimi Polk Gitlin
- Starring: Susan Sarandon; Geena Davis; Harvey Keitel
- Cinematography: Adrian Biddle
- Edited by: Thom Noble
- Music by: Hans Zimmer
- Production companies: Metro-Goldwyn-Mayer; Pathé Entertainment; Percy Main Productions; Star Partners III Ltd.
- Distributed by: MGM-Pathé Communications
- Release dates: May 20, 1991 (Cannes); May 24, 1991 (United States)
- Running time: 129 minutes
- Country: United States
- Language: English
- Budget: $16.5 million
- Box office: $45.4 million

Thelma & Louise is a 1991 American buddy comedy-drama film directed by Ridley Scott and written by Callie Khouri. The film stars Geena Davis and Susan Sarandon as Thelma and Louise, two friends who embark on a road trip that ends up in unforeseen circumstances. The supporting cast includes Harvey Keitel, Michael Madsen, Christopher McDonald, and Brad Pitt. Filming took place in California and Utah from June to August 1990.

Following its premiere at the 44th Cannes Film Festival on May 20, 1991, Thelma & Louise was theatrically released in the United States on May 24. It became a critical and commercial success, receiving six nominations at the 64th Academy Awards, with Khouri winning Best Original Screenplay. Scott was nominated for Best Director, and both Sarandon and Davis were nominated for Best Actress.

Thelma & Louise has influenced other artistic works, and became a landmark of feminist film. In 2006, the American Film Institute ranked it 78th on its list of most inspiring films. In 2016, the Library of Congress selected the film for preservation in the National Film Registry, finding it "culturally, historically, or aesthetically significant". A musical based on the film premiered in September 2026.

== Plot ==
Friends Thelma Dickinson and Louise Sawyer set out for a weekend vacation at a fishing cabin. Thelma, a housewife, is married to disrespectful and controlling carpet salesman Darryl, while sharp-tongued Louise works as a waitress. When Louise arrives to pick her up, Thelma confesses she was too timid to ask Darryl if she could go. So, she left him a note instead, as he has already left for work. Thelma has packed Darryl's gun in her purse and shows it to Louise, who admonishes her for bringing it.

The pair stops at a roadhouse bar. The waitress brings them drinks paid for by Harlan, a regular at the bar. Thelma is happy to have the attention of a man other than Darryl and dances with him, despite Louise's disapproval. When Thelma says she feels sick, Harlan takes her outside to the parking lot and tries to rape her. Louise intervenes with Darryl's gun and threatens to shoot him.

As Thelma and Louise walk away, Harlan yells that he should have continued the rape, which causes Louise to fatally shoot him in a fit of rage. The two women immediately drive off. Thelma wants to go to the police, but Louise fears that no one will believe a claim of attempted rape, as Thelma was seen drinking and dancing with Harlan and they would be facing a murder charge. She tells Thelma she is going to flee to Mexico.

At a gas station, Thelma calls Darryl, who demands that she come home immediately. She tells him off and lets Louise know she is coming to Mexico. J.D., a handsome and charming young drifter, approaches the women asking for a lift out west, and a reluctant Louise allows it when Thelma takes a liking to him. Louise contacts her non-committal musician boyfriend Jimmy, asking him to wire her life savings to her, without saying why.

Jimmy surprises Louise by delivering the money in person. He becomes angry in the hotel room when she does not answer his questions, and she goes to leave. Jimmy then apologizes and gives Louise a diamond ring, prompting her to question his timing. They spend the night together. Meanwhile, J.D. talks his way into Thelma's room. She learns he is a convicted armed robber who has violated his parole. They have sex, the first time Thelma has had an enjoyable sexual experience.

The following morning, Louise tells Jimmy she will not marry him. Jimmy leaves, devastated. Thelma later tells her about her night with J.D. Louise panics when she realizes Thelma left him alone with the money, so the women run to the room, discovering he has stolen Louise's savings and fled. Louise is distraught, so a guilt-ridden Thelma takes charge, later robbing a nearby convenience store using tactics she learned from J.D.

The FBI closes in on the duo after witnesses at the bar identify Louise's 1966 Ford Thunderbird convertible. Led by Arkansas State Police Investigator Hal Slocumb, the police question J.D. and tap into the phone line at Darryl's house. Slocumb sympathizes with the pair's situation and understands why they did not report Harlan's killing. During a few brief phone conversations with Louise, Hal expresses his concerns but is unable to persuade her to surrender.

Later, Thelma and Louise are pulled over by a New Mexico state trooper for speeding. Knowing he will soon discover they are wanted for murder and armed robbery, Thelma holds him at gunpoint and locks him in the trunk of his police car. Driving further west, they encounter a foul-mouthed truck driver who repeatedly makes obscene gestures at them. They pull over and demand an apology from him. When he refuses, they fire at his fuel tanker, causing it to explode.

The FBI locates the women, who lead them on a high-speed chase. They are finally cornered, only 100 yards from the edge of the Grand Canyon. Hal arrives on the scene, but the women refuse his last attempt to talk them into surrendering. Rather than be captured, Thelma proposes that they "keep going". They kiss and hold hands as Louise steps on the gas and, as Hal desperately pursues them on foot waving at them to stop, they accelerate over the cliff and fly off to their deaths.

== Cast ==
- Susan Sarandon as Louise Sawyer
- Geena Davis as Thelma Dickinson
- Harvey Keitel as Det. Hal Slocumb
- Michael Madsen as Jimmy Lennox
- Christopher McDonald as Darryl Dickinson
- Stephen Tobolowsky as FBI Agent Max
- Brad Pitt as J.D.
- Timothy Carhart as Harlan Puckett
- Lucinda Jenney as Lena, The Waitress
- Jason Beghe as State Trooper
- Marco St. John as Truck Driver
- Shelly De Sai as Indian Motel Clerk

== Production ==
=== Development ===
The idea for Thelma & Louise originated in early 1988 when Callie Khouri, then a music video producer, was driving home from work to her apartment in Santa Monica. She spent the following six months working on her first screenplay, which drew inspiration from her own experience and her friendship with country music singer Pam Tillis. She had intended it to be a low-budget independent film, directed by herself and produced by fellow music video producer Amanda Temple (wife of British filmmaker Julien Temple).

After shopping the project around and finding no takers, Temple showed the script to her friend Mimi Polk Gitlin, who ran Ridley Scott's Percy Main Productions (later Scott Free Productions). Gitlin showed the script to Scott, who expressed great enthusiasm for it. He agreed to produce the film and bought the film rights for $500,000. Pathé Entertainment, then led by Scott's friend and collaborator Alan Ladd Jr., came on board as a co-producer and financier. Scott considered four people for the role of director, all of whom turned down the opportunity. Gitlin has said that three of the candidates were Bob Rafelson, Kevin Reynolds and Richard Donner. Scott was reluctant to direct the film himself but eventually took on the role, having been persuaded by Michelle Pfeiffer.

=== Casting ===
Michelle Pfeiffer and Jodie Foster were originally chosen for the leads; both accepted their roles with enthusiasm. During pre-production the two dropped out, with Pfeiffer going on to star in Love Field and Foster in The Silence of the Lambs. Pfeiffer later said she regretted passing on the film. Meryl Streep and Goldie Hawn then offered to play the leads, but Streep dropped out due to scheduling conflicts, while Hawn was not considered right for the part (a year later, in Death Becomes Her, Hawn and Streep played the lead roles). Geena Davis (who had been pursuing the lead role for nearly a year) and Susan Sarandon were ultimately chosen. The two took extensive driving and shooting lessons in preparation for their roles.

Scott convinced Harvey Keitel to take on the role of Hal, the sympathetic Arkansas detective. The two had previously collaborated in Scott's feature directorial debut, the 1977 film The Duellists. Davis recommended her ex-boyfriend Christopher McDonald for the role of Darryl, Thelma's controlling husband. Scott wanted Michael Madsen for Harlan, Thelma's would-be rapist, but Madsen was unwilling; he eventually played Jimmy, Louise's boyfriend. Brad Pitt auditioned for the hustler J.D.; Scott thought he was "too young" for the role so they moved on, and the part was offered to William Baldwin. Pitt eventually secured the role after both Baldwin and his replacement dropped out. Christian Slater, River Phoenix, George Clooney, Robert Downey Jr., Mark Ruffalo, Grant Show, John Mellencamp, Dylan McDermott, James LeGros, and Dermot Mulroney were also considered for the role of J.D. Davis tested scenes with Clooney, Show, Ruffalo and Pitt, and advised the directors to choose Pitt.

=== Filming ===
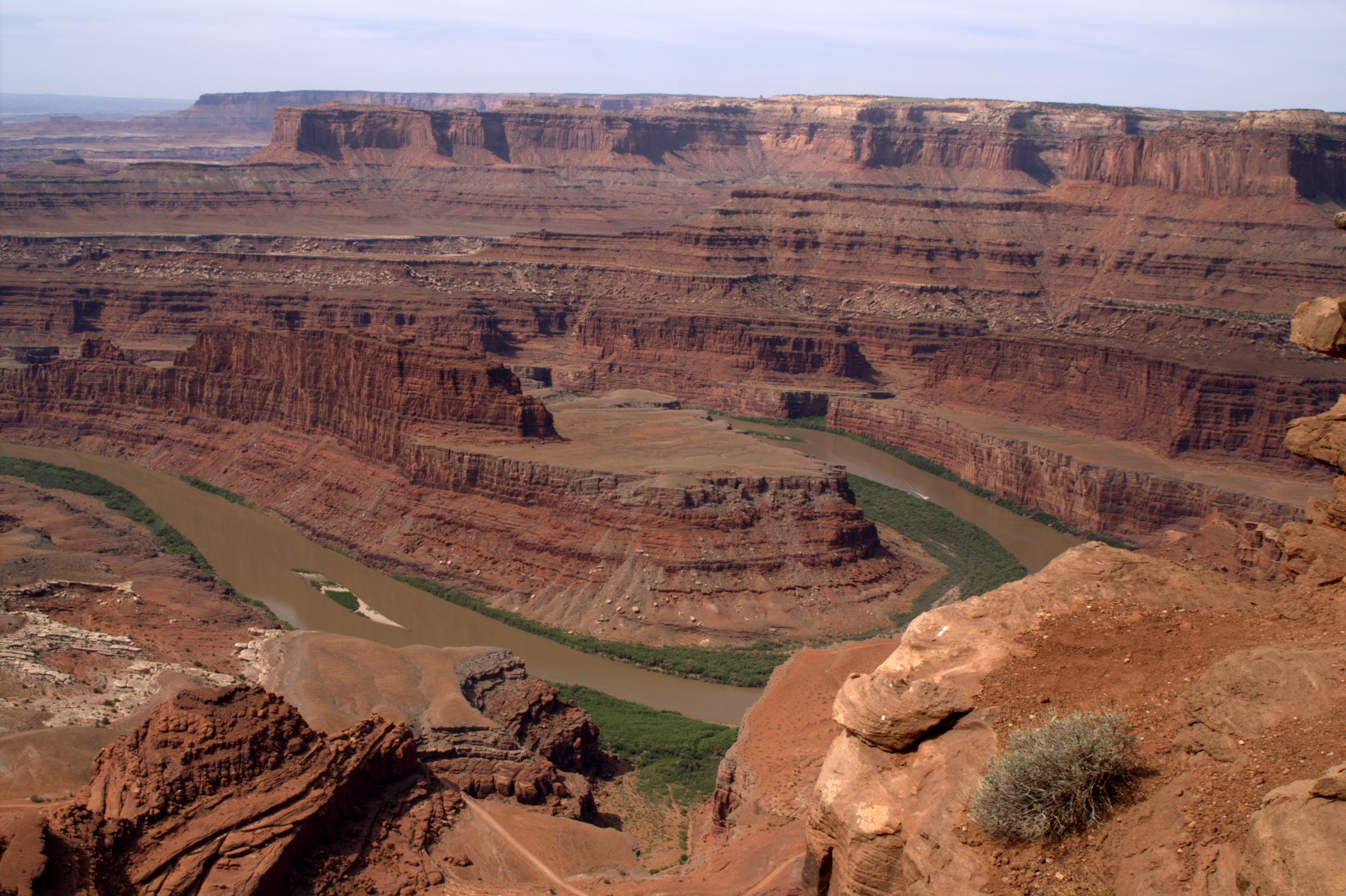
Dead Horse Point State Park

Principal photography for Thelma & Louise began on June 11, 1990, and concluded on August 31, 1990. Although the setting for the film is a fictional route between Arkansas and the Grand Canyon, it was filmed almost entirely in California and Utah. The primary filming locations were rural areas around Bakersfield, California and Moab, Utah. The Grand Canyon scenes were filmed just south of Dead Horse Point State Park in Utah. Parts of the film were also shot at Shafer Overlook, Monument Valley, La Sal Mountains, La Sal Junction, Cisco, Old Valley City Reservoir, Thompson Springs, Arches National Park, and Crescent Junction in Utah. Of filming his love scenes with Davis, Pitt said that it was awkward being nearly naked with everybody standing.

=== Soundtrack ===
Pete Haycock on slide guitar contributed to Thunderbird, the theme music for the film. In addition to Glenn Frey's "Part of Me, Part of You", which became the film's primary theme song, the soundtrack included songs performed by Chris Whitley ("Kick the Stones"), Martha Reeves ("Wild Night", written by Van Morrison), Toni Childs ("House of Hope"), Marianne Faithfull ("Ballad of Lucy Jordan", written by Shel Silverstein), Charlie Sexton ("Badlands"), Grayson Hugh ("I Can't Untie You from Me"), B. B. King ("Better Not Look Down", written by Joe Sample and Will Jennings), Michael McDonald ("No Lookin' Back"), The Temptations ("The Way You Do the Things You Do", written by Smokey Robinson and Bobby Rogers), and Johnny Nash ("I Can See Clearly Now").

== Release ==
Thelma & Louise was screened out of competition as the closing film at the 1991 Cannes Film Festival. Theatrical release was delayed due to financial turmoil at MGM-Pathé. The film eventually opened in American theaters on May 24, 1991 and was a box office success, grossing $45 million domestically.

=== Home media ===
The film was released on VHS on January 8, 1992 by MGM/UA Home Video. It proved especially successful in the home video market; with 380 000 copies being shipped throughout the United States, it became the most rented movie of 1992. In February 2023, The Criterion Collection announced the film would be joining the collection in May that year.

== Reception ==
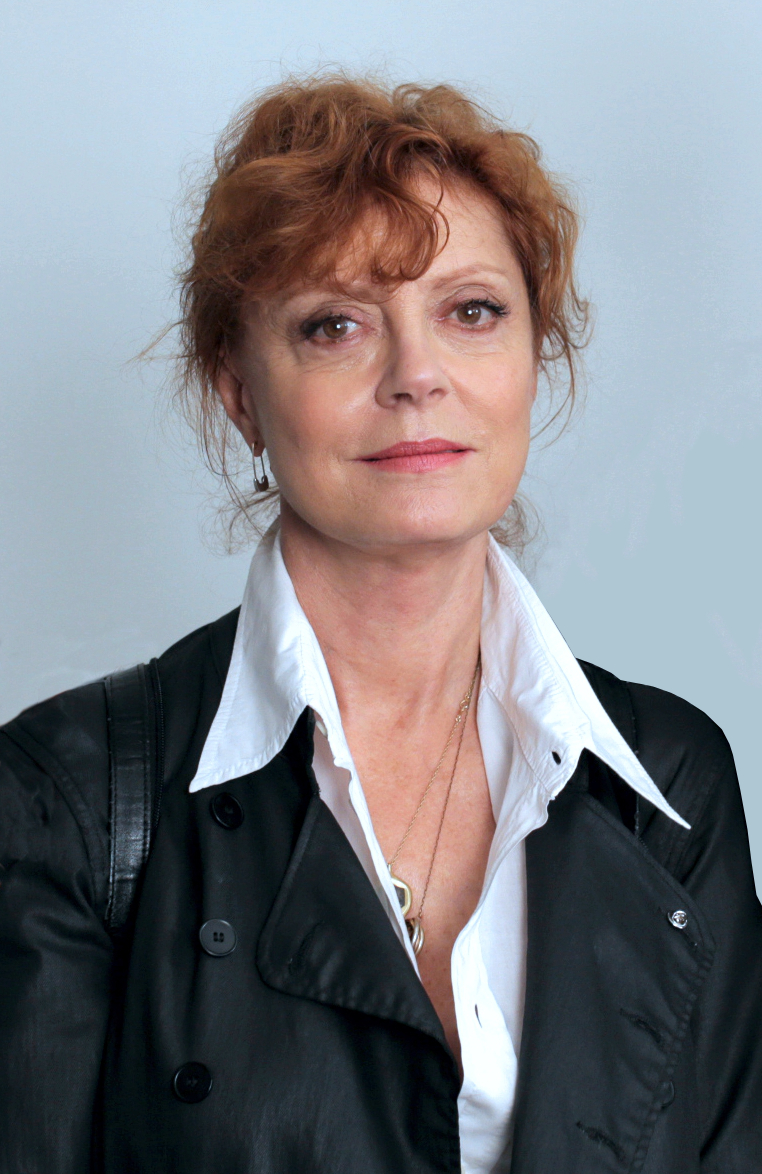
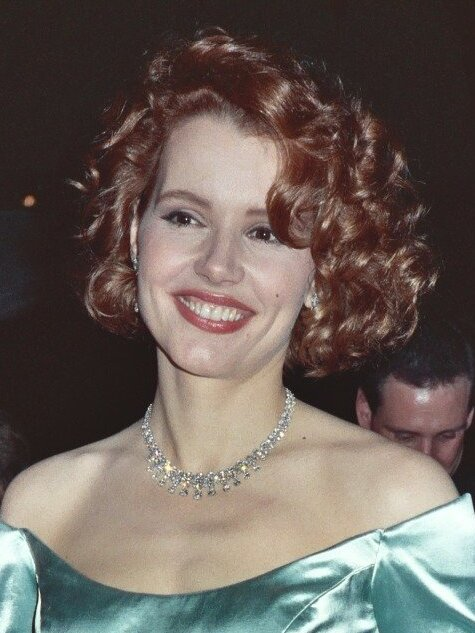
The performances of Susan Sarandon and Geena Davis earned them both nominations for the Academy Award for Best Actress.

Upon release, Thelma & Louise received largely positive reviews, which several publications described as "rave". Janet Maslin of The New York Times had only praise for the film in her review:

Mr. Scott's Thelma and Louise, with a sparkling screenplay by the first-time writer Callie Khouri, is a surprise on this and many other scores. It reveals the previously untapped talent of Mr. Scott (best known for majestically moody action films like Alien, Blade Runner and Black Rain) for exuberant comedy, and for vibrant American imagery, notwithstanding his English roots. It reimagines the buddy film with such freshness and vigor that the genre seems positively new. It discovers unexpected resources in both its stars, Susan Sarandon and Geena Davis, who are perfectly teamed as the spirited and original title characters.

Roger Ebert also praised the film, writing, "What sets Thelma & Louise aside from the great central tradition of the road picture – a tradition roomy enough to accommodate Easy Rider, Bonnie and Clyde, Badlands, Midnight Run and Rain Man – is that the heroes are women this time: Working-class girlfriends from a small Arkansas town, one a waitress, the other a housewife, both probably ready to describe themselves as utterly ordinary, both containing unexpected resources." He added, "This film shows a great sympathy for human comedy", and "Sarandon and Davis find in Callie Khouri's script the materials for two plausible, convincing, lovable characters. And as actors they work together like a high-wire team, walking across even the most hazardous scenes without putting a foot wrong." However, Ebert deducted half a star from his four-star review on the basis of "the last shot before the titles begin. It's a freeze frame that fades to white, which is fine, except it does so with unseemly haste .... It's unsettling to get involved in a movie that takes 128 minutes to bring you to a payoff that the filmmakers seem to fear."

The film also received harsh criticism from those who thought it was biased against men and that its depictions of men were unfairly negative. In response to these criticisms, Maslin and Khouri claimed that Thelma & Louise was being subjected to a double standard, as unethical behavior in male-driven road movies had not provoked a similar level of backlash. Maslin argued that viewers were simply offended at how "men in this story don't really matter ... They are treated as figures in the landscape through which these characters pass, and as such they are essentially powerless. For male characters, perhaps, this is a novelty, but women in road movies have always been treated in precisely the same way." In response to claims that the film had no sympathetic male characters, Khouri pointed to the character of Hal Slocumb, the Arkansas detective who shows empathy for Thelma and Louise’s situation. Khouri said that Hal represents "the moral sense of the audience". She also said she wrote the script in "a conscious effort to counter" Hollywood's tendency to portray women as "bimbos, whores and nagging wives." Khouri added, "If [critics are] feeling threatened, [they're] identifying with the wrong character."

On review aggregator Rotten Tomatoes, the film holds an approval rating of 87% based on 156 reviews, with an average rating of 7.9/10. The website's critical consensus reads, "Driven by the ride-or-die chemistry between Geena Davis and Susan Sarandon while director Ridley Scott provides scorching visuals fit for a postcard, Thelma & Louise is a feminist adventure that's equal parts provocative and rollicking." On Metacritic, the film received a score of 88 based on 12 reviews, indicating "universal acclaim". Audiences polled by CinemaScore gave the film an average grade of "B+" on an A+ to F scale. The film placed second to The Silence of the Lambs as the best film of 1991 in a poll of 81 critics.

=== Accolades ===
Award	Category	Nominee(s)	Result	Ref.
Academy Awards	Best Director	Ridley Scott	Nominated	
Academy Awards	Best Actress	Geena Davis	Nominated	
Academy Awards	Best Actress	Susan Sarandon	Nominated	
Academy Awards	Best Original Screenplay	Callie Khouri	Won	
Academy Awards	Best Cinematography	Adrian Biddle	Nominated	
Academy Awards	Best Film Editing	Thom Noble	Nominated	
Australian Film Institute Awards	Best Foreign Film	Mimi Polk Gitlin and Ridley Scott	Nominated	
Bodil Awards	Best Non-European Film	Ridley Scott	Won	
Boston Society of Film Critics Awards	Best Actress	Geena Davis	Won	
British Academy Film Awards	Best Film	Mimi Polk Gitlin and Ridley Scott	Nominated	
British Academy Film Awards	Best Direction	Ridley Scott	Nominated	
British Academy Film Awards	Best Actress in a Leading Role	Geena Davis	Nominated	
British Academy Film Awards	Best Actress in a Leading Role	Susan Sarandon	Nominated	
British Academy Film Awards	Best Screenplay – Original	Callie Khouri	Nominated	
British Academy Film Awards	Best Cinematography	Adrian Biddle	Nominated	
British Academy Film Awards	Best Editing	Thom Noble	Nominated	
British Academy Film Awards	Best Original Film Score	Hans Zimmer	Nominated	
British Society of Cinematographers Awards	Best Cinematography in a Theatrical Feature Film	Adrian Biddle	Nominated	
Chicago Film Critics Association Awards	Best Film		Nominated	
Chicago Film Critics Association Awards	Best Director	Ridley Scott	Nominated	
Chicago Film Critics Association Awards	Best Actress	Geena Davis	Nominated	
Chicago Film Critics Association Awards	Best Actress	Susan Sarandon	Nominated	
Chicago Film Critics Association Awards	Best Screenplay	Callie Khouri	Nominated	
Chicago Film Critics Association Awards	Most Promising Actor	Brad Pitt	Nominated	
César Awards	Best Foreign Film	Ridley Scott	Nominated	
Dallas–Fort Worth Film Critics Association Awards	Best Film		Nominated	
Dallas–Fort Worth Film Critics Association Awards	Best Actress	Geena Davis and Susan Sarandon	Nominated	
David di Donatello Awards	Best Foreign Film	Ridley Scott	Nominated	
David di Donatello Awards	Best Foreign Actress	Geena Davis	Won (Note: Tied with Susan Sarandon.)	
David di Donatello Awards	Best Foreign Actress	Susan Sarandon	Won (Note: Tied with Geena Davis.)	
Directors Guild of America Awards	Outstanding Directorial Achievement in Motion Pictures	Ridley Scott	Nominated	
Golden Globe Awards	Best Motion Picture – Drama		Nominated	
Golden Globe Awards	Best Actress in a Motion Picture – Drama	Geena Davis	Nominated	
Golden Globe Awards	Best Actress in a Motion Picture – Drama	Susan Sarandon	Nominated	
Golden Globe Awards	Best Screenplay – Motion Picture	Callie Khouri	Won	
London Film Critics Circle Awards	Film of the Year		Won	
London Film Critics Circle Awards	Director of the Year	Ridley Scott	Won	
London Film Critics Circle Awards	Actress of the Year	Susan Sarandon (also for White Palace)	Won	
Los Angeles Film Critics Association Awards	Best Actress	Geena Davis	Nominated	
MTV Movie Awards	Best Female Performance	Geena Davis	Nominated	
MTV Movie Awards	Best On-Screen Duo	Geena Davis and Susan Sarandon	Nominated	
Nastro d'Argento	Best Foreign Director	Ridley Scott	Nominated	
Nastro d'Argento	Best Female Dubbing	Rossella Izzo (for dubbing Susan Sarandon)	Won	
National Board of Review Awards	Top Ten Films		4th Place	
National Board of Review Awards	Best Actress	Geena Davis and Susan Sarandon	Won	
National Film Preservation Board	National Film Registry		Inducted	
National Society of Film Critics Awards	Best Actress	Susan Sarandon	3rd Place	
National Society of Film Critics Awards	Best Supporting Actor	Harvey Keitel (also for Bugsy and Mortal Thoughts)	Won	
New York Film Critics Circle Awards	Best Actress	Geena Davis and Susan Sarandon	Runner-up	
New York Film Critics Circle Awards	Best Screenplay	Callie Khouri	Nominated	
Online Film & Television Association Awards	Film Hall of Fame: Productions		Inducted	
PEN Center USA West Literary Awards	Screenplay	Callie Khouri	Won	
Sant Jordi Awards	Best Foreign Actress	Susan Sarandon	Nominated	
Turkish Film Critics Association Awards	Best Foreign Film		3rd Place	
Valladolid International Film Festival	Golden Spike	Ridley Scott	Won (Note: Tied with Atom Egoyan for The Adjuster.)	
Valladolid International Film Festival	Best Film (Audience Award)	Ridley Scott	Won	
Writers Guild of America Awards	Best Screenplay – Written Directly for the Screen	Callie Khouri	Won	

American Film Institute

- AFI's 100 Years...100 Cheers – No. 78
- AFI's 100 Years…100 Heroes and Villains – No. 24
- AFI's 100 Years…100 Thrills – No. 76

As part of a Modern Classics series, the British Film Institute published a book about the film in 2000. On the Writers Guild of America Award's list of 101 best screenplays released in 2006, it made No. 72.

== Legacy ==
The final scene, where the title characters embrace before driving off a cliff, has become iconic. Numerous homages and parodies of the scene have appeared, including alternate film endings, cartoon parodies, video game "Easter eggs", and as a tragic ending to television series, music videos, and commercials. After the film's release, there were reports of a few incidents where people appeared to copy Thelma and Louise's ending by driving off the edge of the Grand Canyon. After watching the film, singer-songwriter Tori Amos wrote "Me and a Gun", the story of her rape several years earlier.

=== Feminism ===
Many critics and writers have remarked on the strong feminist overtones of Thelma & Louise. Film critic B. Ruby Rich praises the film as an uncompromising validation of women's experiences, while Kenneth Turan calls it a "neo-feminist road movie". Jessica Enevold argues that the film constitutes "an attack on conventional patterns of chauvinist male behavior toward females". In addition, it "exposes the traditional stereotyping of male–female relationships" while rescripting the typical gender roles of the road movie genre.

In her review for the Los Angeles Times, film critic Sheila Benson objected to the characterization of the film as feminist, arguing that it is more preoccupied with revenge and violence than feminist values. In an article commemorating the film's 20th anniversary in 2011, Raina Lipsitz of The Atlantic called it "the last great film about women" and said that it heralded the achievements of women that caused 1992 to become "the year of the woman". However, she also said that women-themed films have since been losing ground.

== Stage adaptation ==
In early 2021, it was announced that Khouri was adapting the film as a stage musical alongside Halley Feiffer, with original songs by Neko Case, and Trip Cullman attached to direct. In January 2023, a workshop reading was held starring Amanda Seyfried and Evan Rachel Wood. The musical, with a book credited solely to Khouri and music and lyrics by Case, premiered at the Young Vic in London on 3 September 2026, directed by Cullman and starring Rachel Tucker as Louise and Amy Lennox as Thelma. It is scheduled to run until 24 October 2026.
