= Chicago Film Critics Association Award for Best Director =

Annual US film award

The Chicago Film Critics Association Award for Best Director is an annual award given by the Chicago Film Critics Association.

== Winners ==
=== 1980s ===
Year	Winner and nominees	Film
1988	Robert Zemeckis	Who Framed Roger Rabbit
1989	Spike Lee	Do the Right Thing
1989	Woody Allen	Crimes and Misdemeanors
1989	Kenneth Branagh	Henry V
1989	Tim Burton	Batman
1989	Steven Soderbergh	Sex, Lies, and Videotape

=== 1990s ===
Year	Winner and nominees	Film
1990	Martin Scorsese	Goodfellas
1991	Jonathan Demme	The Silence of the Lambs
1991	Kenneth Branagh	Peter's Friends
1991	Joel Coen	Barton Fink
1991	Martha Coolidge	Rambling Rose
1991	Terry Gilliam	The Fisher King
1991	Spike Lee	Jungle Fever
1991	Barry Levinson	Bugsy
1991	John Sayles	City of Hope
1991	Martin Scorsese	Cape Fear
1991	Ridley Scott	Thelma & Louise
1991	John Singleton	Boyz n the Hood
1992	Robert Altman	The Player
1992	Clint Eastwood	Unforgiven
1992	Neil Jordan	The Crying Game
1992	Spike Lee	Malcolm X
1992	Quentin Tarantino	Reservoir Dogs
1993	Steven Spielberg	Schindler's List
1993	Robert Altman	Short Cuts
1993	Jane Campion	The Piano
1993	Andrew Davis	The Fugitive
1993	Jonathan Demme	Philadelphia
1994	Quentin Tarantino	Pulp Fiction
1994	Tim Burton	Ed Wood
1994	Steve James	Hoop Dreams
1994	Krzysztof Kieślowski	Three Colours: Red
1994	Robert Zemeckis	Forrest Gump
1995	Oliver Stone	Nixon
1995	Clint Eastwood	The Bridges of Madison County
1995	Mike Figgis	Leaving Las Vegas
1995	Ron Howard	Apollo 13
1995	Martin Scorsese	Casino
1996	Joel Coen	Fargo
1996	Miloš Forman	The People vs. Larry Flynt
1996	Mike Leigh	Secrets & Lies
1996	John Sayles	Lone Star
1996	Lars von Trier	Breaking the Waves
1997	Curtis Hanson	L.A. Confidential
1997	Paul Thomas Anderson	Boogie Nights
1997	James L. Brooks	As Good as It Gets
1997	James Cameron	Titanic
1997	Atom Egoyan	The Sweet Hereafter
1997	Ang Lee	The Ice Storm
1998	Terrence Malick	The Thin Red Line
1998	John Boorman	The General
1998	Neil Jordan	The Butcher Boy
1998	Steven Spielberg	Saving Private Ryan
1998	Peter Weir	The Truman Show
1999	Sam Mendes	American Beauty
1999	Paul Thomas Anderson	Magnolia
1999	Spike Jonze	Being John Malkovich
1999	Stanley Kubrick	Eyes Wide Shut
1999	David Lynch	The Straight Story

=== 2000s ===
Year	Winner and nominees	Film
2000	Steven Soderbergh	Traffic
2000	Darren Aronofsky	Requiem for a Dream
2000	Cameron Crowe	Almost Famous
2000	Ang Lee	Crouching Tiger, Hidden Dragon
2000	Robert Zemeckis	Cast Away
2001	David Lynch	Mulholland Dr.
2001	Robert Altman	Gosford Park
2001	Ron Howard	A Beautiful Mind
2001	Peter Jackson	The Lord of the Rings: The Fellowship of the Ring
2001	Baz Luhrmann	Moulin Rouge!
2002	Todd Haynes	Far from Heaven
2002	Paul Thomas Anderson	Punch-Drunk Love
2002	Peter Jackson	The Lord of the Rings: The Two Towers
2002	Alexander Payne	About Schmidt
2002	Roman Polanski	The Pianist
2002	Martin Scorsese	Gangs of New York
2003	Peter Jackson	The Lord of the Rings: The Return of the King
2003	Tim Burton	Big Fish
2003	Sofia Coppola	Lost in Translation
2003	Clint Eastwood	Mystic River
2003	Peter Weir	Master and Commander: The Far Side of the World
2004	Clint Eastwood	Million Dollar Baby
2005	David Cronenberg	A History of Violence
2005	George Clooney	Good Night, and Good Luck.
2005	Peter Jackson	King Kong
2005	Ang Lee	Brokeback Mountain
2005	Steven Spielberg	Munich
2006	Martin Scorsese	The Departed
2006	Clint Eastwood	Letters from Iwo Jima
2006	Stephen Frears	The Queen
2006	Paul Greengrass	United 93
2006	Alejandro González Iñárritu	Babel
2007	Joel Coen and Ethan Coen	No Country for Old Men
2007	Paul Thomas Anderson	There Will Be Blood
2007	David Fincher	Zodiac
2007	Tony Gilroy	Michael Clayton
2007	Jason Reitman	Juno
2008	Danny Boyle	Slumdog Millionaire
2008	David Fincher	The Curious Case of Benjamin Button
2008	Christopher Nolan	The Dark Knight
2008	Andrew Stanton	WALL-E
2008	Gus Van Sant	Milk
2009	Kathryn Bigelow	The Hurt Locker
2009	Joel Coen and Ethan Coen	A Serious Man
2009	Spike Jonze	Where the Wild Things Are
2009	Jason Reitman	Up in the Air
2009	Quentin Tarantino	Inglourious Basterds

=== 2010s ===
Year	Winner and nominees	Film
2010	David Fincher	The Social Network
2010	Darren Aronofsky	Black Swan
2010	Debra Granik	Winter's Bone
2010	Tom Hooper	The King's Speech
2010	Christopher Nolan	Inception
2011	Terrence Malick	The Tree of Life
2011	Michel Hazanavicius	The Artist
2011	Alexander Payne	The Descendants
2011	Nicolas Winding Refn	Drive
2011	Martin Scorsese	Hugo
2012	Kathryn Bigelow	Zero Dark Thirty
2012	Ben Affleck	Argo
2012	Paul Thomas Anderson	The Master
2012	Steven Spielberg	Lincoln
2012	Benh Zeitlin	Beasts of the Southern Wild
2013	Steve McQueen	12 Years a Slave
2013	Joel Coen and Ethan Coen	Inside Llewyn Davis
2013	Alfonso Cuarón	Gravity
2013	Spike Jonze	Her
2013	David O. Russell	American Hustle
2014	Richard Linklater	Boyhood
2014	Wes Anderson	The Grand Budapest Hotel
2014	David Fincher	Gone Girl
2014	Alejandro G. Iñárritu	Birdman or (The Unexpected Virtue of Ignorance)
2014	Christopher Nolan	Interstellar
2015	George Miller	Mad Max: Fury Road
2015	Todd Haynes	Carol
2015	Alejandro G. Iñárritu	The Revenant
2015	Tom McCarthy	Spotlight
2015	Adam McKay	The Big Short
2016	Barry Jenkins	Moonlight
2016	Damien Chazelle	La La Land
2016	Pablo Larraín	Jackie
2016	Kenneth Lonergan	Manchester by the Sea
2016	Chan-wook Park	The Handmaiden
2017	Christopher Nolan	Dunkirk
2017	Guillermo del Toro	The Shape of Water
2017	Greta Gerwig	Lady Bird
2017	Luca Guadagnino	Call Me by Your Name
2017	Jordan Peele	Get Out
2018	Alfonso Cuarón	Roma
2018	Bradley Cooper	A Star Is Born
2018	Yorgos Lanthimos	The Favourite
2018	Lynne Ramsay	You Were Never Really Here
2018	Paul Schrader	First Reformed
2019	Bong Joon-ho	Parasite
2019	Noah Baumbach	Marriage Story
2019	Greta Gerwig	Little Women
2019	Martin Scorsese	The Irishman
2019	Quentin Tarantino	Once Upon a Time in Hollywood

=== 2020s ===
Year	Winner and nominees	Film
2020	Chloé Zhao	Nomadland
2020	Emerald Fennell	Promising Young Woman
2020	Spike Lee	Da 5 Bloods
2020	Steve McQueen	Lovers Rock
2020	Kelly Reichardt	First Cow
2021	Jane Campion	The Power of the Dog
2021	Paul Thomas Anderson	Licorice Pizza
2021	Ryusuke Hamaguchi	Drive My Car
2021	David Lowery	The Green Knight
2021	Steven Spielberg	West Side Story
2022	Daniel Kwan & Daniel Schinert	Everything Everywhere All at Once
2022	Park Chan-wook	Decision to Leave
2022	Todd Field	Tár
2022	Sarah Polley	Women Talking
2022	S. S. Rajamouli	RRR
2023	Christopher Nolan	Oppenheimer
2023	Greta Gerwig	Barbie
2023	Todd Haynes	May December
2023	Yorgos Lanthimos	Poor Things
2023	Martin Scorsese	Killers of the Flower Moon
2024	RaMell Ross	Nickel Boys
2024	Sean Baker	Anora
2024	Brady Corbet	The Brutalist
2024	Coralie Fargeat	The Substance
2024	Jane Schoenbrun	I Saw the TV Glow

== Multiple winners ==
5 directors have won the award multiple times.

Wins	Director
2	Kathryn Bigelow
2	Joel Coen
2	Terrence Malick
2	Martin Scorsese
2	Christopher Nolan
