= Boyz n the Hood =

1991 film directed by John Singleton

- Theatrical release poster
- Directed by: John Singleton
- Written by: John Singleton
- Produced by: Steve Nicolaides
- Starring: Ice Cube; Cuba Gooding Jr.; Morris Chestnut; Laurence Fishburne
- Cinematography: Charles Mills
- Edited by: Bruce Cannon
- Music by: Stanley Clarke
- Distributed by: Columbia Pictures
- Release dates: July 2, 1991 (Los Angeles); July 12, 1991 (United States)
- Running time: 112 minutes
- Country: United States
- Language: English
- Budget: $5.7–6.5 million
- Box office: $57.5 million

Boyz n the Hood is a 1991 American coming-of-age hood crime drama film, written and directed by John Singleton in his feature directorial debut. It stars Cuba Gooding Jr. and Laurence Fishburne, with Nia Long, Tyra Ferrell and Angela Bassett in supporting roles, and also marks the film debuts of Ice Cube, Morris Chestnut, and Regina King. Named after the 1987 Eazy-E song "The Boyz-n-the Hood", written by Ice Cube, the film follows Tre Styles (Gooding), who is sent to live with his father Furious Styles (Fishburne) in South Central Los Angeles, where he reunites with his childhood friends while being surrounded by the neighborhood's booming gang culture.

Singleton initially developed the film as a requirement for his application to film school in 1986 and sold the script to Columbia Pictures upon graduation in 1990. During writing, he drew inspiration from his own life and from the lives of people he knew and insisted he direct the project. Principal photography began in September 1990 and was filmed on location from October to November 1990. The film features breakout roles for Ice Cube, Gooding Jr., Chestnut, and Long.

Boyz n the Hood was screened in the Un Certain Regard section at the 1991 Cannes Film Festival. It premiered in Los Angeles on July 2, 1991, and was theatrically released in the United States ten days later. The film became a critical and commercial success, grossing $57.5 million in North America and earning nominations for Best Director and Best Original Screenplay at the 64th Academy Awards. Singleton became the youngest person and the first African American to be nominated for Best Director. In 2002, the United States Library of Congress deemed it "culturally, historically, or aesthetically significant" and selected it for preservation in the National Film Registry.

== Plot ==
In 1984, 10-year-old Jason "Tre" Styles III lives with his single mother, Reva Devereaux, in South Central Los Angeles. After Tre gets into an altercation at school, his teacher informs Reva that although intelligent, he lacks maturity and respect. Reva concernedly sends him to the Crenshaw neighborhood, hoping he will learn life lessons from his strict but also caring and attentive father Jason "Furious" Styles Jr., who is also her ex-husband.

While in Crenshaw, Tre reunites with childhood friends Darrin "Doughboy" Baker, Doughboy's half-brother Ricky, and their friend Chris Brown. One night, Furious notifies the LAPD, after shooting, of a burglar sneaking into their house who ultimately escapes. An hour later, two police officers arrive: Graham, the white officer, is civil and professional, while Coffey, the black officer, is hostile and demonstrates self-hatred. The next day, Chris leads his friends to a dead body, after which they are harassed by a group of Crips-affiliated teenagers. Later on, while returning from a fishing trip, Tre and Furious notice Doughboy and Chris being arrested for shoplifting.

Seven years later, Doughboy, now a Crip, high school dropout and drug dealer, is released from prison. Attending his homecoming party are Chris, now paraplegic from a gunshot wound, and new friends and fellow Crips Dooky and Monster. Ricky, now a star running back at Crenshaw High School, lives with his mother Brenda, his girlfriend Shanice, and their toddler son. Lewis Crump, a visiting University of Southern California recruiter, instructs Ricky to obtain an SAT score above a 700 to qualify for a football scholarship. Meanwhile, Tre, now mature and responsible, hopes to attend college with his girlfriend Brandi Harris. Their relationship is troubled over Tre's desire to have sex, while Brandi is a traditional Catholic who wants to wait until after marriage.

At a nighttime street gathering on Crenshaw Boulevard, Ferris, a member of the rival Bloods gang, bumps and provokes Ricky, inciting a confrontation that involves Doughboy flashing a handgun. Ferris fires an automatic weapon into the air, frightening all present into fleeing. As Tre and Ricky flee, they are pulled over by Officer Coffey, who harasses and intimidates them. Tre later retreats to Brandi's house and breaks down in her arms. After she comforts him, they have sex for the first time.

The next afternoon, Doughboy and his gang notice Ferris and two Bloods members driving through their neighborhood seeking retribution for the previous night's confrontation. Tasked by Brenda to run an errand, Ricky encounters and fights Doughboy, with Brenda defending Ricky and smacking Doughboy. Ricky's test results are delivered as he and Tre depart. Later spotted by the Bloods, they cut through back alleys to avoid them before splitting up. However, the Bloods locate and fatally shoot Ricky, and a distraught Doughboy helps Tre carry Ricky's bloodied corpse home. Brenda and Shanice, who are both devastated by Ricky's death, tearfully blame Doughboy for instigating the shooting. Later that night, Brenda and Shanice discover that Ricky scored a 710, enough to qualify for the scholarship he sought.

Vengefully taking and loading his father's gun, Tre almost departs to join Doughboy and the rest of his friends outside but Furious intercepts him, seemingly convincing him to reject revenge. Moments later, though, Furious and Brandi catch Tre sneaking out to join his friends. Later that night, as they drive around the city, Tre comes to his senses and returns home. After Doughboy, Dooky, and Monster unexpectedly encounter Ferris and the Bloods eating outside a fast food restaurant, Monster shoots the fleeing trio in a drive-by shooting. Doughboy then stops and exits his car to approach their bodies; aware Ricky's killer and Ferris are still alive, he coldly murders them. Later that evening, when Tre arrives home, he and Furious silently stare at each other before entering their bedrooms for the night.

Doughboy visits Tre the following morning, understanding why he abandoned the gang. Knowing he will face retaliation for killing Ferris, and reflecting on his own lifestyle, Doughboy questions why the plight of those living in the ghetto is ignored by the mainstream media, and laments Ricky's death and his mother's disaffection. Tre embraces him as a surrogate brother. As Doughboy departs and Tre goes back into his house, a postscript from the epilogue text reveals that Ricky was buried the next day and Doughboy was murdered two weeks later. Tre and Brandi ultimately depart in the fall to attend college at Morehouse and Spelman.

== Cast ==
- Ice Cube as Darrin "Doughboy" Baker
  - Baha Jackson as young Doughboy
- Cuba Gooding Jr. as Jason “Tre” Styles III
  - Desi Arnez Hines II as young Tre
- Laurence Fishburne as Jason “Furious” Styles Jr.
- Nia Long as Brandi Harris
  - Nicole Brown as young Brandi
- Morris Chestnut as Ricky Baker
  - Donovan McCrary as young Ricky
- Tyra Ferrell as Brenda Baker
- Angela Bassett as Reva Devereaux
- Meta King as Maria Harris
- Whitman Mayo as The Old Man
- Regina King as Shalika
- Redge Green as Chris Brown
  - Kenneth A. Brown as young Chris
- Dedrick D. Gobert as Dooky
- Baldwin C. Sykes as Monster
- Alysia Rogers as Shanice
- Tracey Lewis-Sinclair as Shaniqua
- Yolanda Whittaker as Yo-Yo
- Lexie Bigham as "Mad Dog"
- Raymond Turner as Ferris
- Malcolm Norrington as Knucklehead #1
- Lloyd Avery II as Knucklehead #2
- Chris Noth as The Waiter
- John Singleton as The Mailman
- Kirk Kinder as Officer Graham
- Jessie Lawrence Ferguson as Officer Coffey

== Production ==
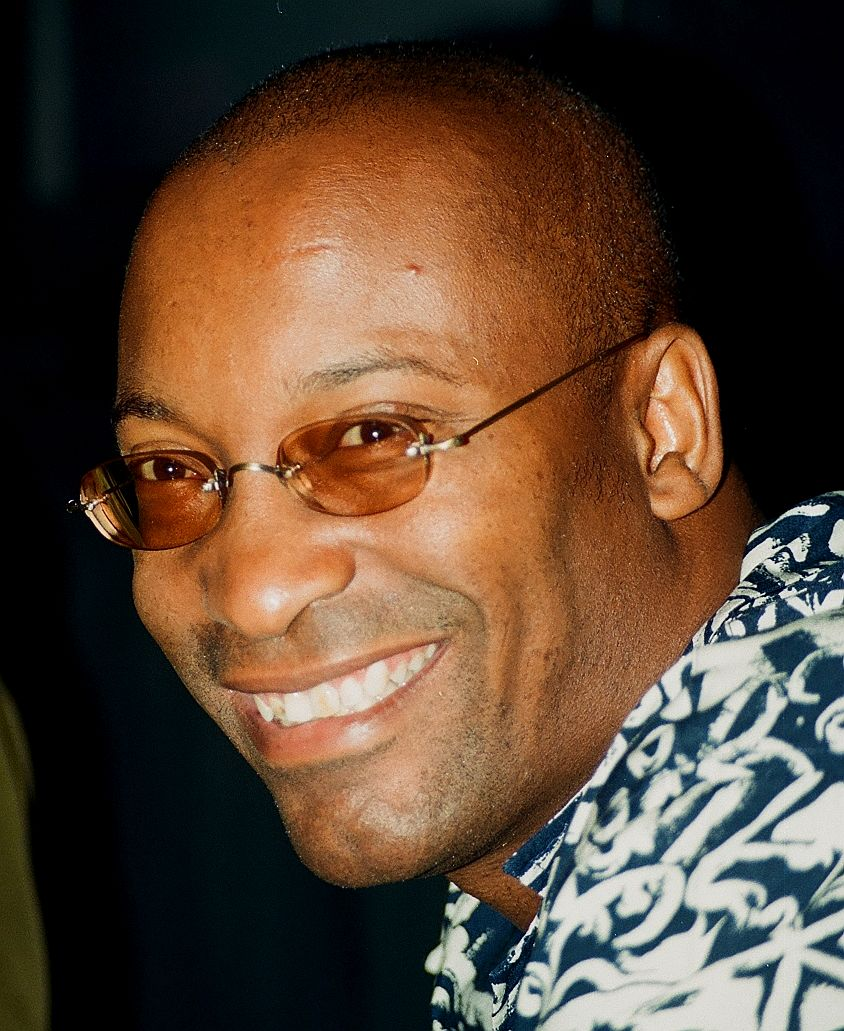
John Singleton wrote Boyz n the Hood based on his own life and that of people he knew.

Singleton wrote the film based on his own life and that of people he knew. When applying for film school, one of the questions on the application form was to describe "three ideas for films". One of the ideas Singleton composed was titled Summer of 84, which later evolved into Boyz n the Hood. During writing, Singleton was influenced by the 1986 film Stand by Me, which inspired both an early scene where four young boys take a trip to see a dead body and the closing fade-out of main character Doughboy.

Upon completion, Singleton was protective of his script, insisting that he be the one to direct the project, later explaining at a retrospective screening of the film "I wasn't going to have somebody from Idaho or Encino direct this movie." He sold the script to Columbia Pictures in 1990, who greenlit the film immediately out of interest in making a film similar to the comedy-drama film Do the Right Thing (1989).

The role of Doughboy was written specially for Ice Cube, whom Singleton met while working as an intern at The Arsenio Hall Show. Singleton also noted the studio was unaware of Ice Cube's standing as a member of rap group N.W.A. Singleton claims Gooding and Chestnut were cast because they were the first ones who showed up to auditions, while Fishburne was cast after Singleton met him on the set of Pee-wee's Playhouse, where Singleton worked as a production assistant and security guard.

Long grew up in the area the film depicts and has said, "It was important as a young actor to me that this feels real because I knew what it was like go home from school and hear gunshots at night." Bassett referred to Singleton as her "little brother" on set. "I'd been in LA for about three years and I was trying, trying, trying to do films," she said. "We talked, I auditioned and he gave me a shot. I've been waiting to work with him ever since."

The film was shot in sequence, with Singleton later noting that as the film goes on, the camera work gets better as Singleton was finding his foothold as a director. He has a cameo in the film, appearing as a mailman handing over mail to Brenda as Doughboy and Ricky are having a scuffle in the front yard. Filming began on October 1, 1990, in South Central Los Angeles, with several gang members serving as consultants, on "wardrobe, vocal emphasis and dialogue changes" to ensure authenticity.

== Reception and legacy ==
=== Box office ===
Boyz n the Hood was released in North America on July 12, 1991. It made $10 million in its opening weekend from 829 theaters, debuting at #3 at the box office. It finished its run with $57.5 million.

=== Critical response ===
Review aggregation website Rotten Tomatoes gives the film an approval rating of 93% based on 139 reviews and an average score of 8.10/10. The website's critical consensus reads, "Well-acted and thematically rich, Boyz n the Hood observes urban America with far more depth and compassion than many of the like-minded films its success inspired." At Metacritic, the film received an average score of 76 out of 100 based on 20 reviews, which indicates "generally favorable" reviews.

Film scholar Timothy Laurie suggests that Boyz n the Hood engages with the wider social and political issues of the early 1990s: "Tre Styles is already being ensnared within a discourse of risk that positions young black boys as potential perpetrators of violence; as Andrés Leal argues, the urban environment in Boyz n the Hood becomes ‘a definitory element in the formation of the "hood individuals" present and future identities’ (2013, 30). Tragedies have been pre-plotted in Tre's life story."

=== Cultural impact ===
Boyz n the Hood launched the acting careers of Gooding, Cube, Chestnut, Long and King, who were given their first major leading roles in the film, as well as the first significant film role for Angela Bassett.

For his work, Singleton earned nominations for Best Director and Best Original Screenplay at the 64th Academy Awards, making him the youngest person and first African American to be nominated for Best Director. Since then, the only black nominees in the category have been Lee Daniels, Steve McQueen, Barry Jenkins, Jordan Peele, Spike Lee and Ryan Coogler. In 2002, the United States Library of Congress deemed the film to be "culturally, historically, or aesthetically significant" and selected it for preservation in the National Film Registry.

In 2024 the Academy Museum of Motion Pictures launched an exhibition based on Boyz n the Hood, curated by Esme Douglas. Located in The Significant Movies and Moviemakers gallery as part of their Stories of Cinema series, the exhibition examines John Singleton's debut film Boyz n the Hood as well as "the movie's groundbreaking depiction of Black life in South Central Los Angeles as well as its lasting impact in popular culture." The exhibition features location and production photographs by D Stevens and Ithaka Darin Pappas, costumes and props, behind the scenes footage, a mural, and displays discussing the film's impact on pop culture. It opened on February 6, 2024 and ran to January 4, 2026.

=== Accolades ===
Award	Category	Nominee(s)	Result	Ref.
Academy Awards	Best Director	John Singleton	Nominated	
Academy Awards	Best Screenplay – Written Directly for the Screen	John Singleton	Nominated	
BMI Film & TV Awards	Film Music Award	Stanley Clarke	Won	
Chicago Film Critics Association Awards	Best Film		Nominated	
Chicago Film Critics Association Awards	Best Director	John Singleton	Nominated	
Chicago Film Critics Association Awards	Best Supporting Actor	Ice Cube	Nominated	
Chicago Film Critics Association Awards	Best Supporting Actor	Laurence Fishburne	Nominated	
Chicago Film Critics Association Awards	Best Screenplay	John Singleton	Nominated	
Chicago Film Critics Association Awards	Most Promising Actor	Ice Cube	Won	
Chicago Film Critics Association Awards	Most Promising Actor	Cuba Gooding Jr.	Nominated	
Dallas–Fort Worth Film Critics Association Awards	Best Film		Nominated	
Dallas–Fort Worth Film Critics Association Awards	Best Director	John Singleton	Nominated	
Kids' Choice Awards	Favorite Movie		Nominated	
Kids' Choice Awards	Favorite Movie Actor	Ice Cube	Nominated	
Los Angeles Film Critics Association Awards	New Generation Award	John Singleton	Won	
MTV Movie Awards	Best Movie		Nominated	
MTV Movie Awards	Best New Filmmaker	John Singleton	Won	
NAACP Image Awards	Outstanding Motion Picture		Won	
National Board of Review Awards	Top Ten Films		7th Place	
National Film Preservation Board	National Film Registry		Inducted	
New York Film Critics Circle Awards	Best New Director	John Singleton	Won	
Online Film & Television Association Awards	Hall of Fame – Motion Picture		Won	
Political Film Society Awards	Exposé		Nominated	
Political Film Society Awards	Human Rights		Won	
Political Film Society Awards	Peace		Won	
Stockholm International Film Festival	Bronze Horse	John Singleton	Nominated	
Writers Guild of America Awards	Best Screenplay – Written Directly for the Screen	John Singleton	Nominated	
Young Artist Awards	Outstanding Young Ensemble Cast in a Motion Picture	Desi Arnez Hines II, Baha Jackson, and Donovan McCrary	Won	

- In 2007, Boyz n the Hood was selected as one of the 50 Films To See in your lifetime by Channel 4.

==== American Film Institute Lists ====
- AFI's 100 Years...100 Movies (10th Anniversary Edition) – Nominated

== Home media ==
Boyz n the Hood was released on VHS and LaserDisc in 1992, DVD in 1998, Blu-ray in 2011, and Ultra HD Blu-ray in 2020. The film was released on Blu-ray and Ultra HD Blu-ray by The Criterion Collection in April 2026 in the "John Singleton’s Hood Trilogy" set with Poetic Justice and Baby Boy.

== Soundtrack ==
Album	Peak chart positions		Certifications
Album	U.S.	U.S. R&B	Certifications
Boyz n the Hood: Released: July 9, 1991; Label: Qwest/Warner Bros. Records	12	1	US: Gold
