= Rambling Rose (film) =

1991 American dramatic film directed by Martha Coolidge

- Official poster
- Directed by: Martha Coolidge
- Screenplay by: Calder Willingham
- Based on: Rambling Rose; 1972 novel by Calder Willingham
- Produced by: Renny Harlin; Mario Kassar; Edgar J. Scherick
- Starring: Laura Dern; Diane Ladd; Lukas Haas; Robert Duvall; John Heard
- Cinematography: Johnny E. Jensen
- Edited by: Steven Cohen
- Music by: Elmer Bernstein
- Production companies: Carolco Pictures; Midnight Sun Pictures
- Distributed by: Seven Arts (through New Line Cinema)
- Release date: September 20, 1991
- Running time: 112 minutes
- Country: United States
- Language: English
- Budget: $7.5 million
- Box office: $6.3 million

Rambling Rose is a 1991 American drama film directed by Martha Coolidge and written by Calder Willingham (based on his 1972 novel of the same name). It stars Laura Dern and Robert Duvall in leading roles, with Lukas Haas, John Heard, and Diane Ladd in supporting roles. The film is set in Georgia during the Great Depression (1935).

Ahead of the 64th Academy Awards in 1992, Dern was nominated for the Academy Award for Best Actress, while her real-life mother Ladd was nominated for Best Supporting Actress, making them the first mother-daughter duo to be nominated for Academy Awards for the same film or in the same year. The film won the Independent Spirit Award for Best Film and Coolidge won the Independent Spirit Award for Best Director.

== Plot ==
Glennville, Georgia 1971: Buddy Hillyer returns to his former family home and reflects on his youth during the Great Depression, when Rose came to live with his family to escape her miserable life in Birmingham, where she was being forced into prostitution. The Hillyers are an eccentric family who take Rose in as a domestic servant. Rose quickly begins to admire Mrs. Hillyer, who is working on her master's thesis and who she learns was orphaned at a young age, just as Rose had been. Rose also develops a crush on the paternal and warm Mr. Hillyer. The three Hillyer children and Mr. Hillyer become aware of this while Mrs. Hillyer remains oblivious. Because she is hard of hearing (she carries an early kind of hearing aid), she misses some of the byplay.

Eventually, Rose kisses Mr. Hillyer, who at first responds to her advances and then becomes angry and rebuffs her. Buddy witnesses Rose and Mr. Hillyer kissing, and later, when Rose gets into his bed to talk to him at night, he repeatedly tries and eventually is allowed to fondle her breast just as his father had done while he was kissing Rose. Eventually, to satisfy his curiosity, Rose allows 13-year-old Buddy to perform manual sex on her. Afterwards, she is apologetic and upset and begs him not to tell anyone.

The Hillyers begin to disagree about Rose's presence in their lives. Mr. Hillyer worries that Rose is too promiscuous when she goes to town and will cause them problems, but Mrs. Hillyer sees her promiscuity as her way of trying to obtain love and attention.

Strange men begin lurking around the house and even fighting with one another. Mr. Hillyer attributes this to Rose, but she repeatedly denies knowing them before eventually admitting it. However, Rose is eventually arrested when some of her men begin brawling in a bar over her, and she bites the finger of a policeman. Though the police and Mrs. Hillyer are willing to forgive Rose, Mr. Hillyer insists on firing her, but before he can, Rose is hospitalized with a bad case of pneumonia. The attending doctor tells them that Rose has too strong a basic constitution to have had the desperately poor country background she has asserted. During her convalescence, she develops a passion for the doctor, who spends hours in her room during his visits to her. After she recovers, Rose seems to be on her best behavior but Mr. Hillyer eventually catches her with another man in her room. He fires her but obtains a position on a dairy farm in Tennessee for her. When he informs Rose, she begins crying and says that she is pregnant and does not want her baby to be born on a farm.

Mr. Hillyer believes she is lying about being pregnant and the Hillyers take her to a doctor where they learn that while she is showing signs of being pregnant she actually has an ovarian cyst and is sterile because of untreated gonorrhea contracted when she was 15. The doctor recommends a radical full hysterectomy, involving the removal of the womb and both ovaries, potentially resulting in a less feminine appearance and reduced sexual drive, as it would reduce Rose's promiscuous behavior. While Mr. Hillyer initially agrees to the operation, Mrs. Hillyer argues against it and eventually persuades the two men. Rose is treated for her cyst and returns home where she eventually marries the policeman whose finger she bit. Returning to the 1971 reflection, Buddy reveals that Rose married three more times and was eventually happy with and faithful to her last husband with whom she lived for 25 years. He goes to talk to his father who tells him that Rose died the previous week. When Buddy begins crying Mr. Hillyer tells him that Rose is a person who will never really die as she will live on forever in their hearts.

== Cast ==
- Laura Dern as Rose, an orphan who comes to work for the Hillyer family
- Diane Ladd as Mrs. Hillyer
- Lukas Haas as Willcox "Buddy" Hillyer
  - John Heard as Adult Buddy Hillyer
- Robert Duvall as Mr. Hillyer
- Kevin Conway as Dr. Martinson
- Robert John Burke as Dave Wilkie, Rose's first husband
- Lisa Jakub as Frances "Dolly" Hillyer
- Evan Lockwood as Warren "Waski" Hillyer

== Production ==
Edgar Scherick admired the novel and hired Calder Willingham to write a script but could not get finance. He showed it to Martha Coolidge, who showed the script to Laura Dern who loved it. Scherick said, "Laura was living with Finnish action director Renny Harlin, and she told him that she wanted to make that picture more than anything in the world. And he had some pull with Miramax and they wanted to do what he wanted to do. And that's how the movie got made."

In reference to the bed scene between Rose (Laura Dern) and young Buddy Hillyer (Lukas Haas), director Martha Coolidge said Haas was sort of the perfect age to play the part of Buddy. "It was important not to have a child because the scene would have been unpleasant. It was also important not to have a man because the scene would have meant something else." Capitalizing on the actor's curiosity about sex, Coolidge said, "Lukas knows that acting is living. He has made 25 movies. His great gift in Rambling Rose is that he shared something important, his first experience with sex, with the audience. Yet the whole scene is an illusion, except when he touches Laura's breasts."

== Reception ==
The film received overwhelmingly positive reviews. On Rotten Tomatoes, it has a 100% approval rating, based on 19 reviews, with the critics consensus calling it "a touching, bittersweet, and wonderfully-acted film." Peter Travers of Rolling Stone praised the storytelling and performances, summarizing the film as "beauty." Roger Ebert of the Chicago Sun-Times gave the film 3 out of 4 stars, saying "The movie is all character and situation, and contains some of the best performances of the year, especially in the ensemble acting of the four main characters." On his TV program with Gene Siskel, At the Movies, both critics gave it a thumbs up. Owen Gleiberman of Entertainment Weekly gave the film a B, extolling the performances, particularly Dern. He wrote, "No young actress today can play emotionally hungry postadolescents with such purity and yearning."

=== Awards and nominations ===
Award	Category	Nominee(s)	Result
Academy Awards	Best Actress	Laura Dern	Nominated
Academy Awards	Best Supporting Actress	Diane Ladd	Nominated
Chicago Film Critics Association Awards	Best Director	Martha Coolidge	Nominated
Chicago Film Critics Association Awards	Best Actress	Laura Dern	Nominated
Chicago Film Critics Association Awards	Best Supporting Actress	Diane Ladd	Nominated
Dallas–Fort Worth Film Critics Association Awards	Best Actress	Laura Dern	Nominated
Golden Globe Awards	Best Actress in a Motion Picture – Drama	Laura Dern	Nominated
Golden Globe Awards	Best Supporting Actress – Motion Picture	Diane Ladd	Nominated
Independent Spirit Awards	Best Feature		Won
Independent Spirit Awards	Best Director	Martha Coolidge	Won
Independent Spirit Awards	Best Male Lead	Robert Duvall	Nominated
Independent Spirit Awards	Best Supporting Female	Diane Ladd	Won
Independent Spirit Awards	Best Cinematography	Johnny E. Jensen	Nominated
Los Angeles Film Critics Association Awards	Best Supporting Actor	Robert Duvall	Runner-up
Montreal World Film Festival	Best Actress	Laura Dern	Won (Note: Tied with Lee Hye-sook for Silver Stallion.)
National Board of Review Awards	Top Ten Films		8th Place
National Society of Film Critics Awards	Best Screenplay	Calder Willingham	3rd Place
USC Scripter Awards		Calder Willingham	Nominated
Yoga Awards	Worst Foreign Casting	Diane Ladd (also for Wild at Heart)	Won
Young Artist Awards	Best Young Actor Starring in a Motion Picture	Lukas Haas	Nominated
Young Artist Awards	Best Young Actress Co-Starring in a Motion Picture	Lisa Jakub	Nominated
