= Chicago Film Critics Association Awards 1991 =

Annual US film awards ceremony

4th CFCA Awards

Best Film:
Silence of the Lambs

The 4th Chicago Film Critics Association Awards were announced on March 5, 1992 during a ceremony at The Pump Room. They honored the finest achievements in 1991 filmmaking. The nominees were revealed in January 1992. Thelma & Louise and Barton Fink tied for the most nominations with six each. The Silence of the Lambs earned the most awards (5), including Best Film.

== Winners and nominees ==
The winners and nominees for the 4th Chicago Film Critics Awards are as follows:

=== Best Actor ===
Anthony Hopkins – The Silence of the Lambs

- Warren Beatty – Bugsy
- Val Kilmer – The Doors
- Nick Nolte – The Prince of Tides
- John Turturro – Barton Fink

=== Best Actress ===
Jodie Foster – The Silence of the Lambs

- Geena Davis – Thelma & Louise
- Laura Dern – Rambling Rose
- Anne Parillaud – La Femme Nikita
- Susan Sarandon – Thelma & Louise

=== Best Cinematography ===
Roger Deakins – Barton Fink

=== Best Director ===
Jonathan Demme – The Silence of the Lambs

- Joel Coen – Barton Fink
- Ridley Scott – Thelma & Louise

=== Best Film ===
The Silence of the Lambs

- Barton Fink
- Beauty and the Beast
- Boyz n the Hood
- Thelma & Louise

=== Best Foreign Film ===
An Angel at My Table

=== Best Screenplay ===
Ted Tally – The Silence of the Lambs

- Joel and Ethan Coen – Barton Fink
- Callie Khouri – Thelma & Louise

=== Best Supporting Actor ===
Harvey Keitel – Bugsy

- John Goodman – Barton Fink

=== Best Supporting Actress ===
Mercedes Ruehl – The Fisher King

=== Most Promising Actor ===
Ice Cube – Boyz n the Hood

- Brad Pitt – Thelma & Louise

=== Most Promising Actress ===
Juliette Lewis – Cape Fear

=== Commitment to Chicago ===
Irv and Essie Kupcinet
