= Boston Society of Film Critics Awards 1991 =

Annual US film awards ceremony

12th BSFC Awards

December 26, 1991

Best Film:
The Silence of the Lambs

The 12th Boston Society of Film Critics Awards honored the best filmmaking of 1991.

== Winners ==
- Best Film:
  - The Silence of the Lambs
- Runner-up: JFK
- Best Actor:
  - Nick Nolte – The Prince of Tides
- Runner-up: Robin Williams - The Fisher King
- Best Actress:
  - Geena Davis – Thelma & Louise
- Runner-up: Jodie Foster - The Silence of the Lambs
- Best Supporting Actor:
  - Anthony Hopkins – The Silence of the Lambs
- Runner-up: Harvey Keitel - Bugsy
- Best Supporting Actress:
  - Mercedes Ruehl – The Fisher King
- Runner-up: Juliette Lewis - Cape Fear
- Best Director:
  - Jonathan Demme – The Silence of the Lambs
- Runner-up: Oliver Stone - JFK
- Best Screenplay:
  - David Cronenberg – Naked Lunch
- Runner-up: Ted Tally - The Silence of the Lambs
- Best Cinematography:
  - Tak Fujimoto – The Silence of the Lambs
- Best Documentary:
  - Paris Is Burning
- Best Foreign-Language Film:
  - Europa Europa • Germany/France/Poland
