= National Board of Review Awards 1991 =

Annual film awards

63rd National Board of Review Awards

Best Picture:
The Silence of the Lambs

The 63rd National Board of Review Awards, honoring the best in filmmaking in 1991, were announced on 16 December 1991 and given on 24 February 1992.

== Top 10 films ==
1. The Silence of the Lambs
2. Bugsy
3. Grand Canyon
4. Thelma & Louise
5. Homicide
6. Dead Again
7. Boyz N the Hood
8. Rambling Rose
9. Frankie and Johnny
10. Jungle Fever

== Top Foreign Films ==
1. Europa Europa
2. The Vanishing
3. La Femme Nikita
4. My Father's Glory and My Mother's Castle
5. Toto le Héros

== Winners ==
- Best Picture:
  - The Silence of the Lambs
- Best Foreign Language Film:
  - Europa Europa, Germany/France
- Best Actor:
  - Warren Beatty - Bugsy
- Best Actress:
  - Geena Davis and Susan Sarandon - Thelma & Louise
- Best Supporting Actor:
  - Anthony Hopkins - The Silence of the Lambs
- Best Supporting Actress:
  - Kate Nelligan - Frankie and Johnny
- Best Director:
  - Jonathan Demme - The Silence of the Lambs
- Best Documentary:
  - Hearts of Darkness: A Filmmaker's Apocalypse
- Special Award for Animation:
  - Beauty and the Beast
- Career Achievement Award:
  - Lauren Bacall
