= 49th Golden Globe Awards =

Film award ceremony in 1992

- Date: January 18, 1992
- Site: The Beverly Hills Hilton Hotel, Beverly Hill, Los Angeles, California, U.S.
- Hosted by: Jacqueline Bisset; Pierce Brosnan

Highlights
- Best Film: Drama: Bugsy
- Best Film: Musical or Comedy: Beauty and the Beast
- Best Drama Series: Northern Exposure
- Best Musical or Comedy Series: Brooklyn Bridge
- Most awards: (3) Beauty and the Beast
- Most nominations: (8) Bugsy

Television coverage
- Network: TBS

The 49th Golden Globe Awards, honoring the best in film and television for 1991, were held on January 18, 1992 at the Beverly Hilton. The nominations were announced on December 27, 1991.

== Winners and nominees ==
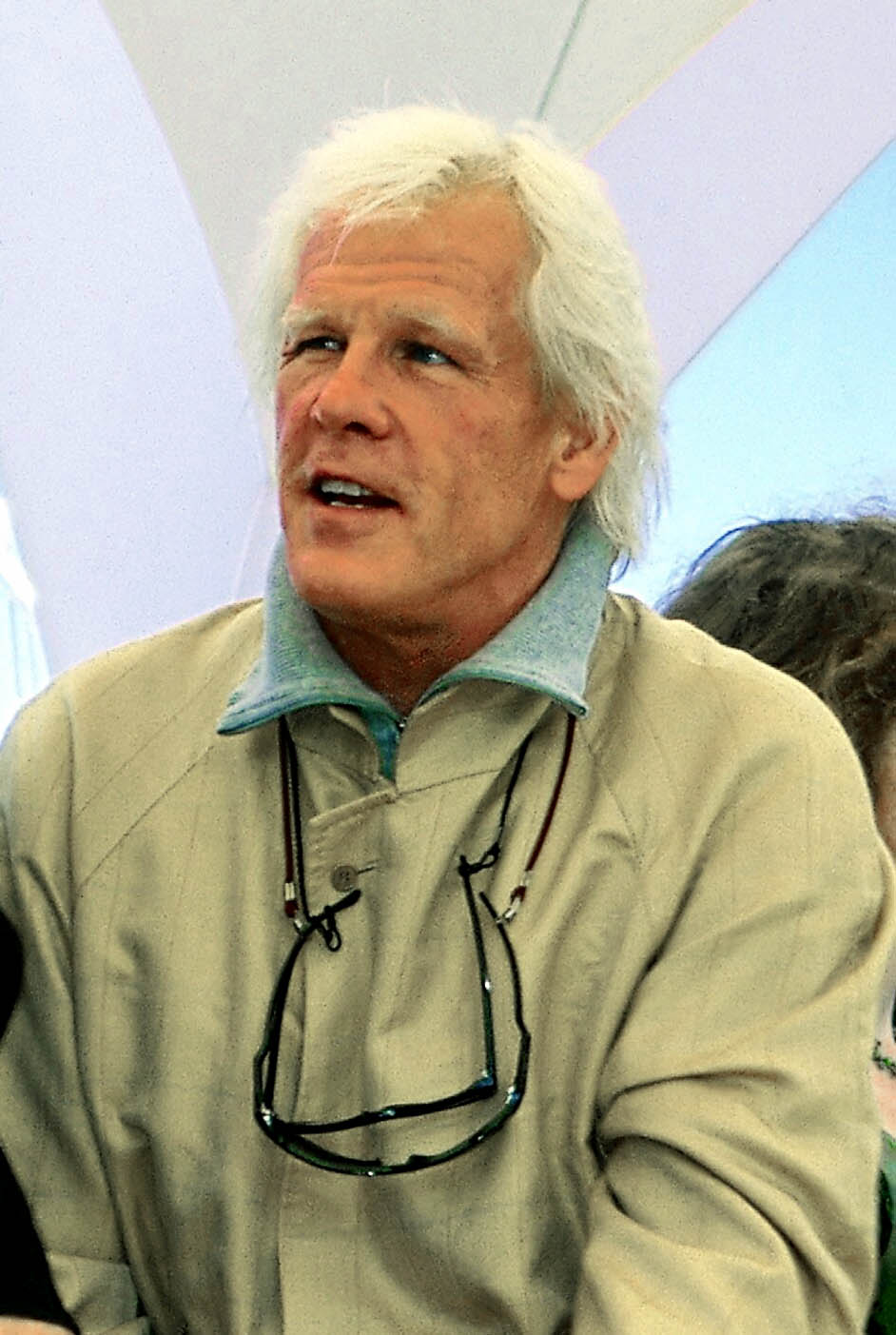
Nick Nolte, Best Actor Motion Picture – Drama winner

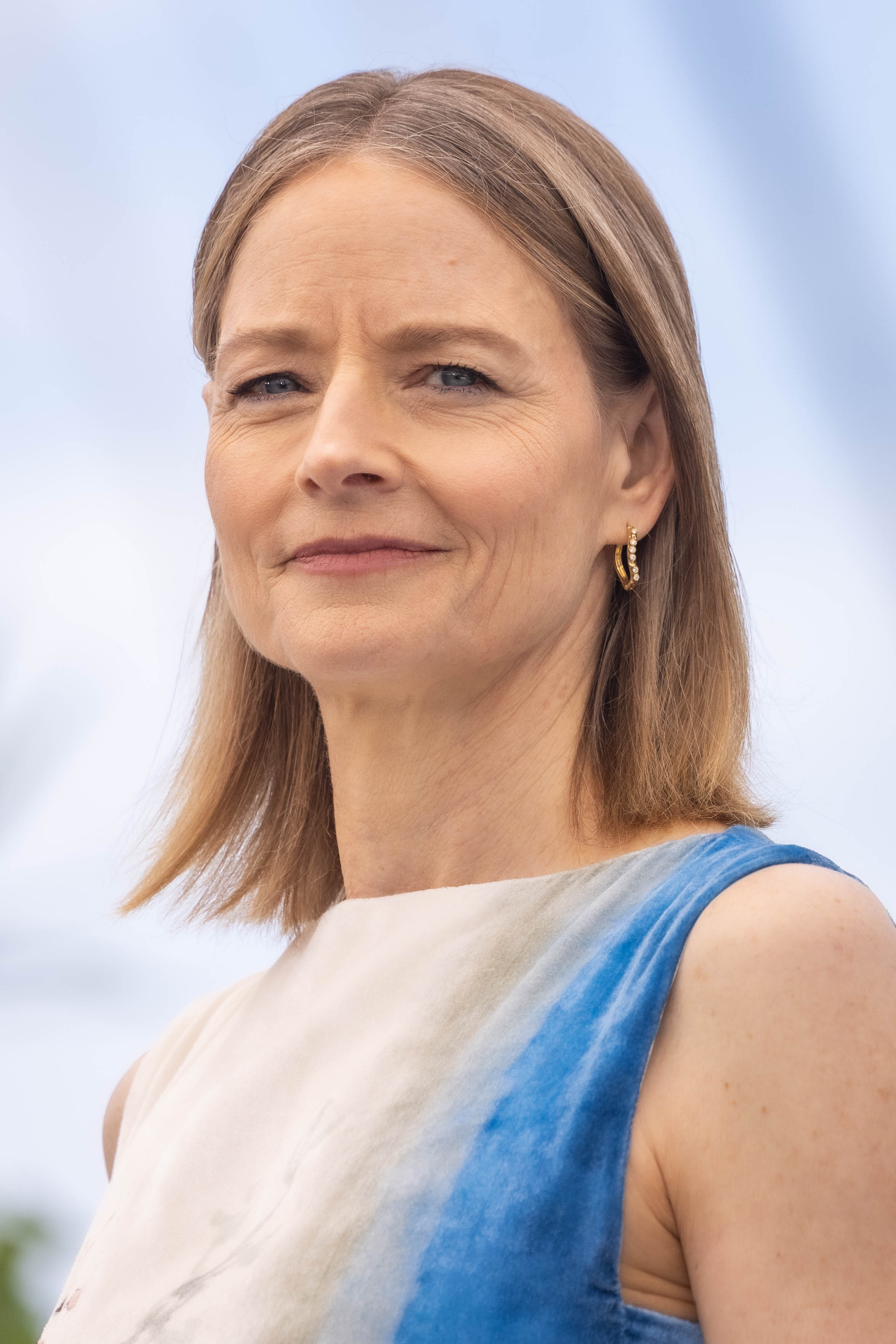
Jodie Foster, Best Actress Motion Picture – Drama winner

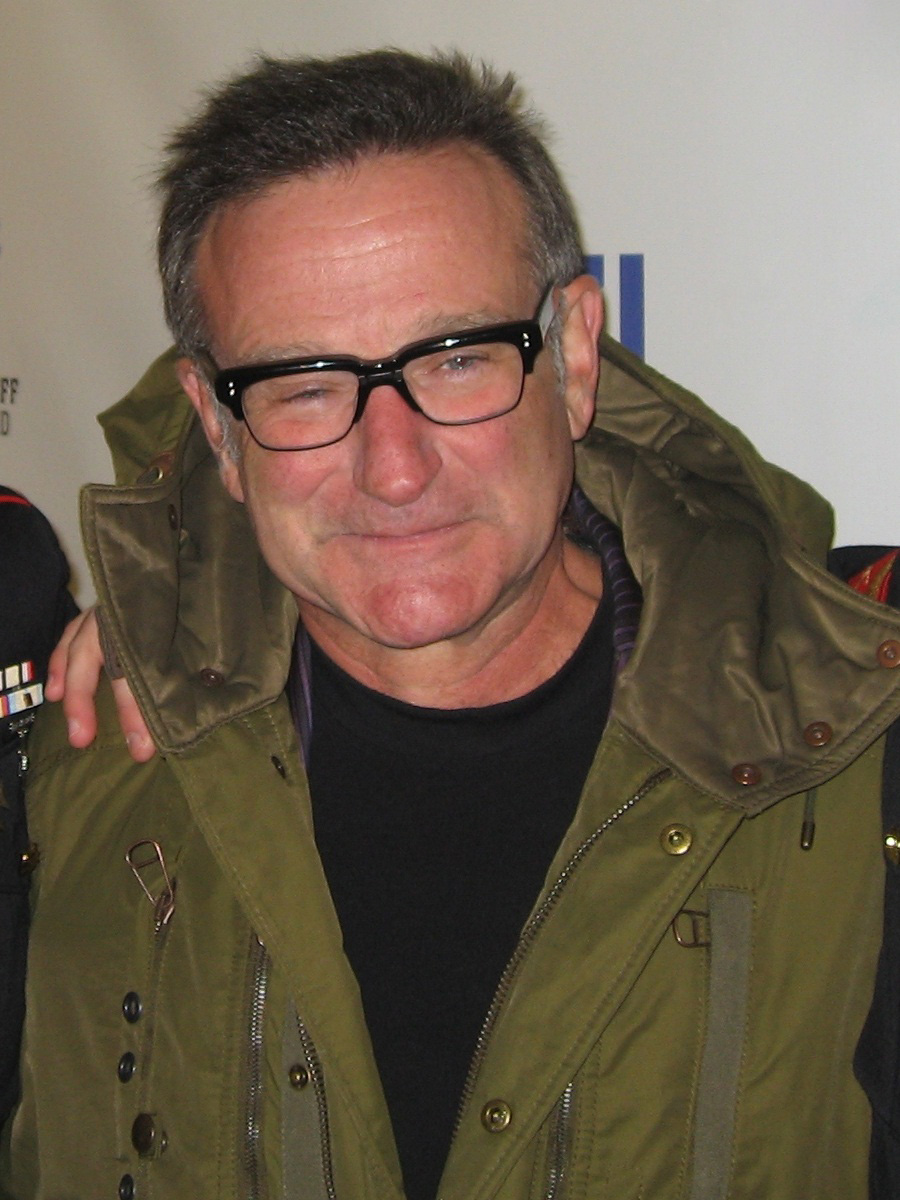
Robin Williams, Best Actor Motion Picture – Musical or Comedy winner

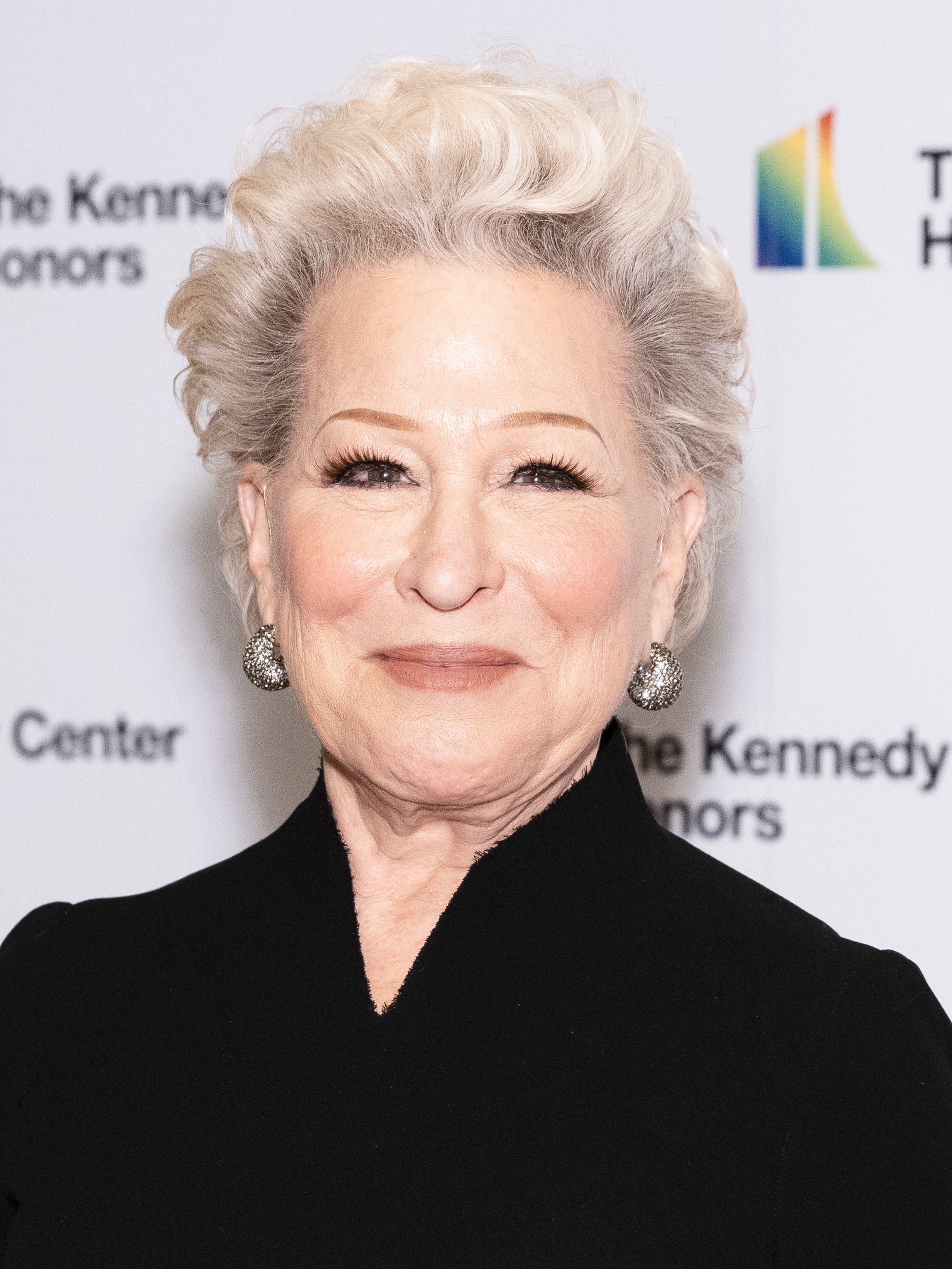
Bette Midler, Best Actress Motion Picture – Musical or Comedy winner

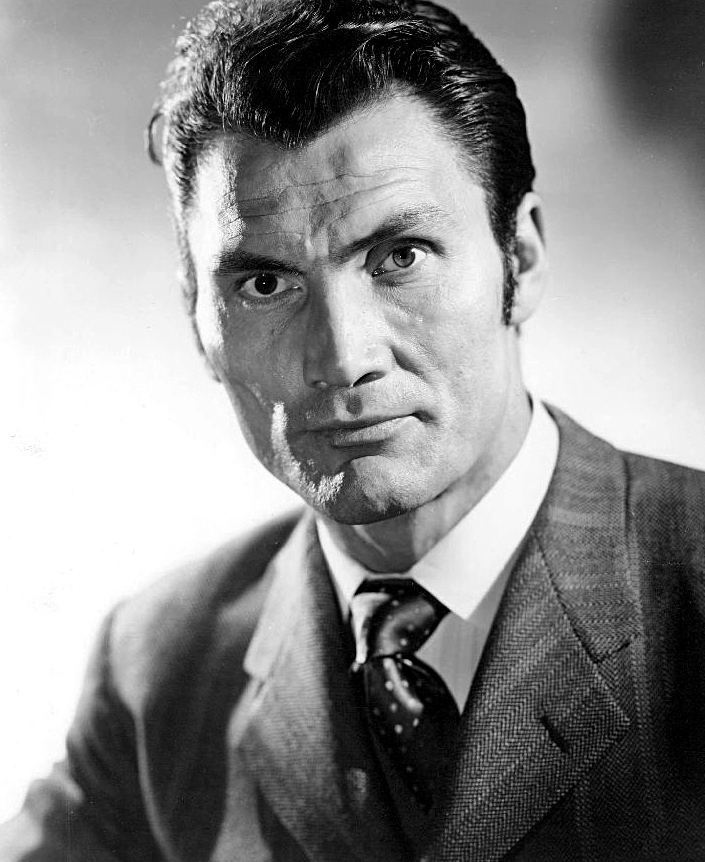
Jack Palance, Best Supporting Actor winner

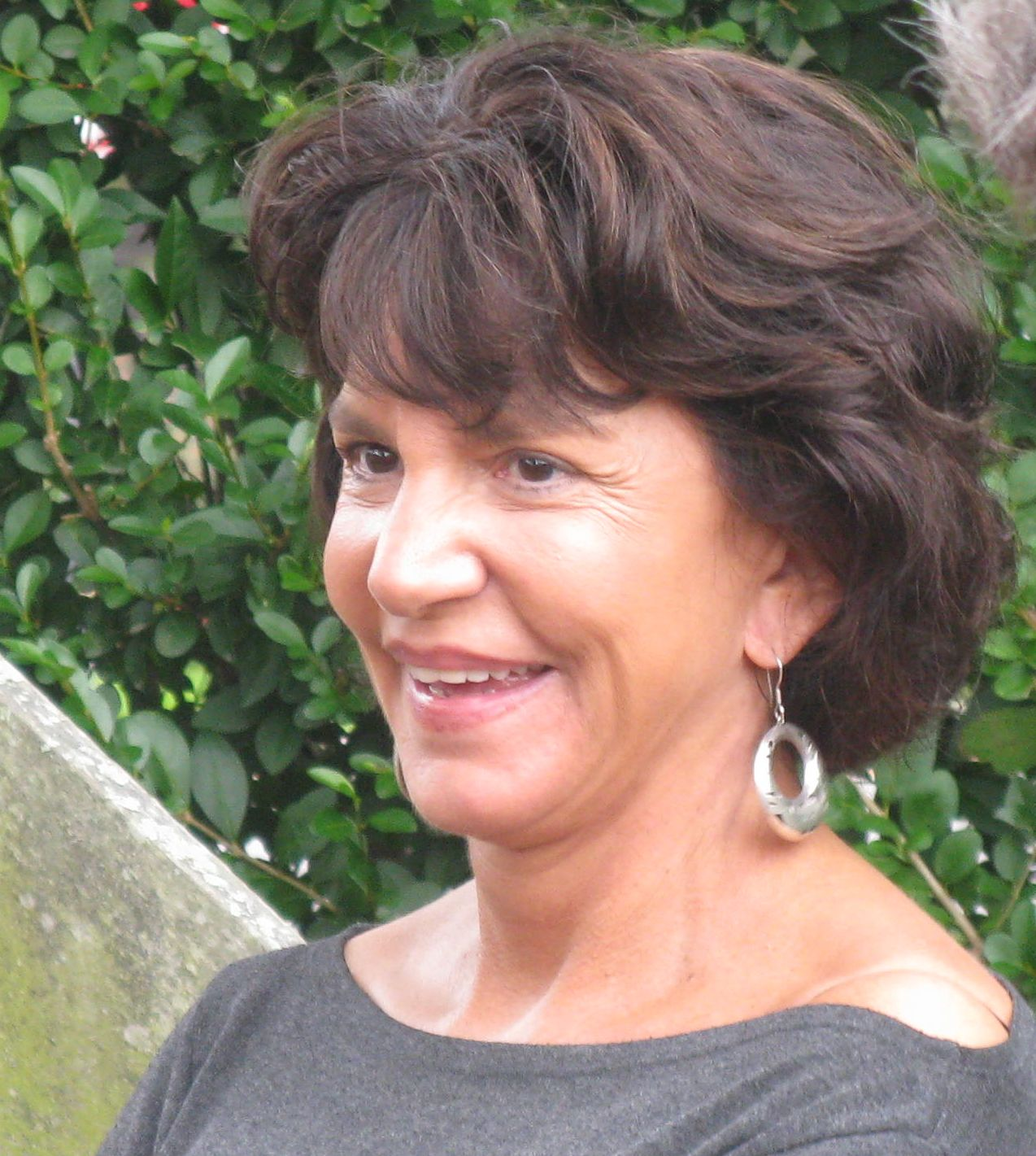
Mercedes Ruehl, Best Supporting Actress winner

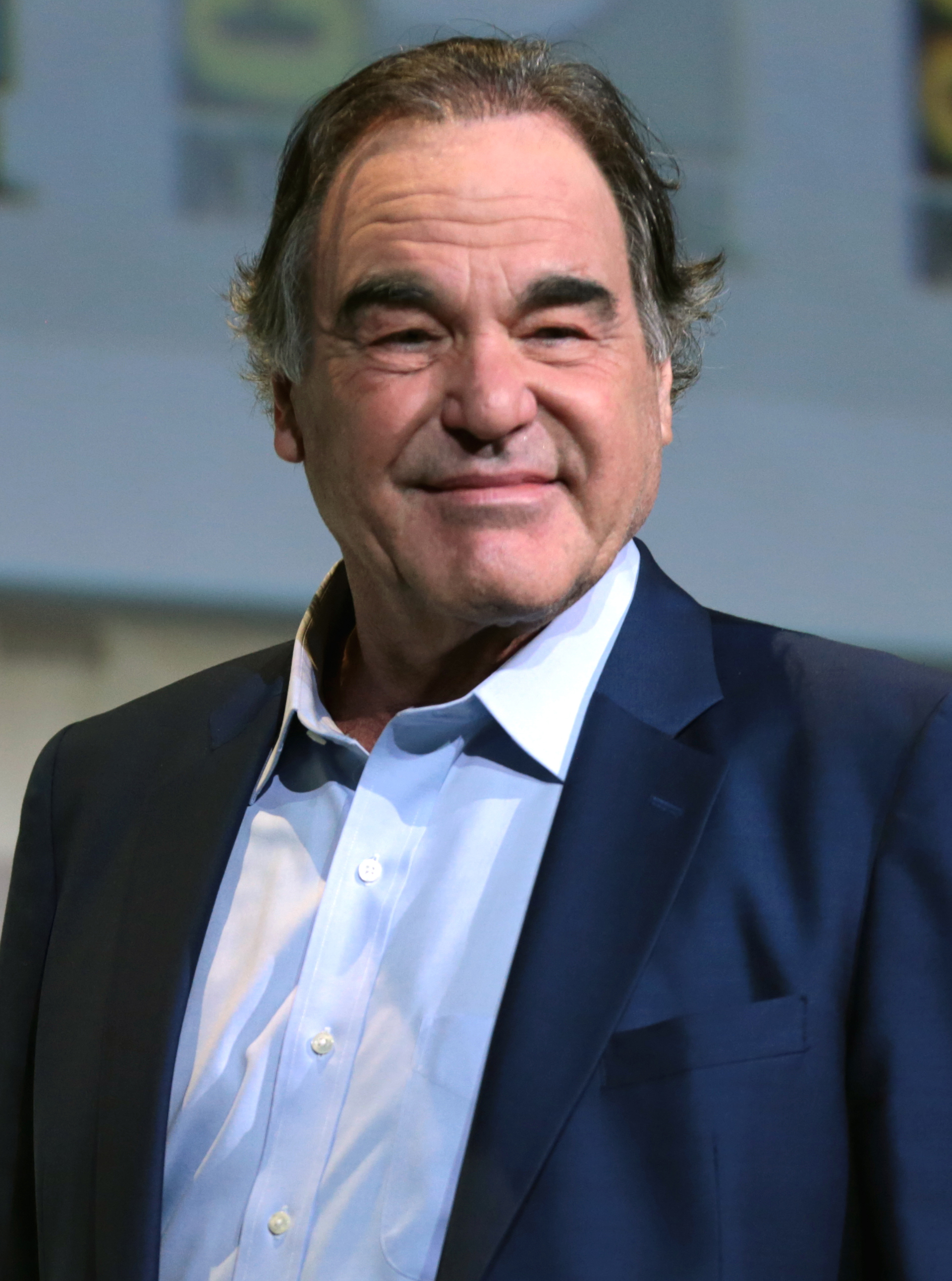
Oliver Stone, Best Director winner

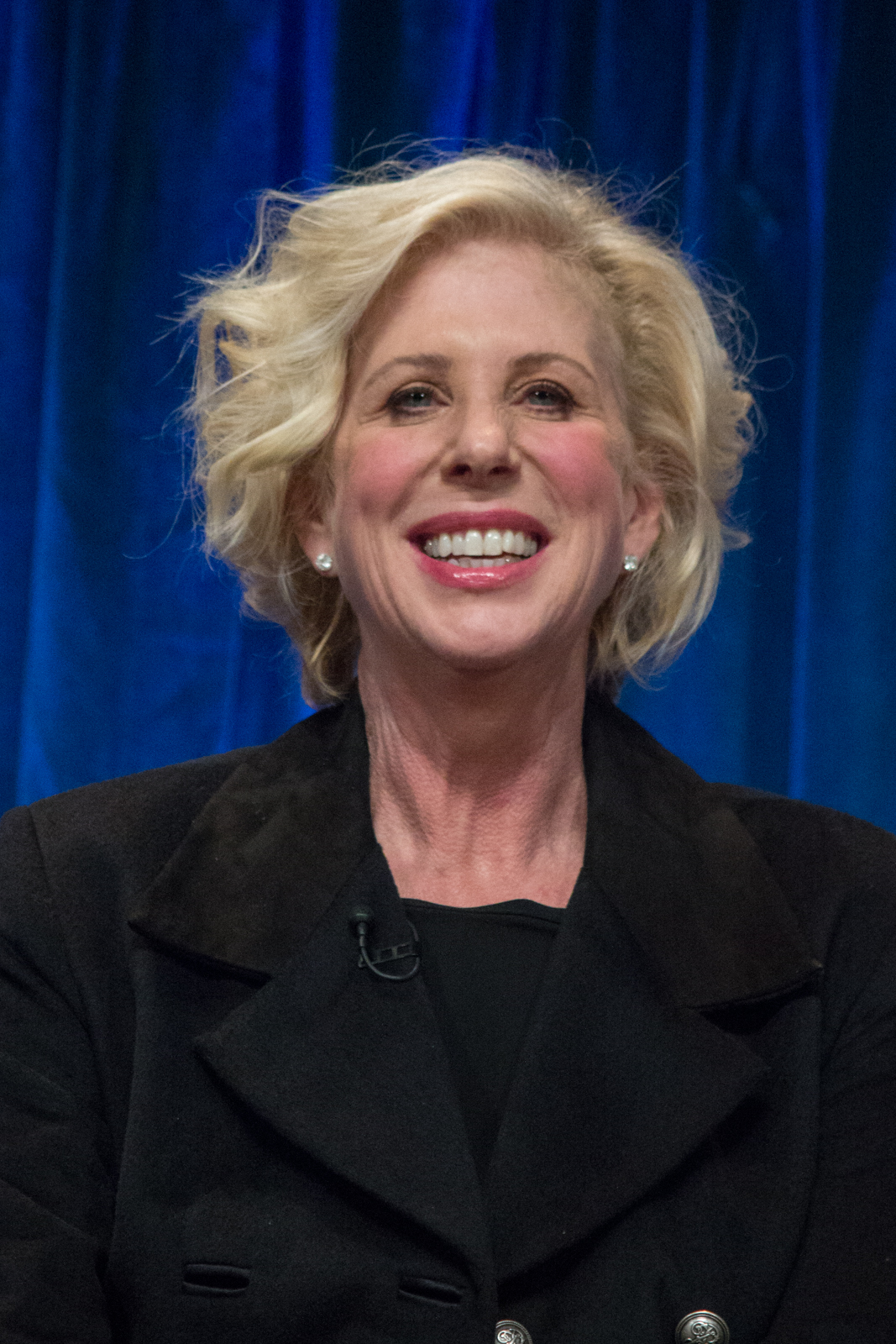
Callie Khouri, Best Screenplay winner

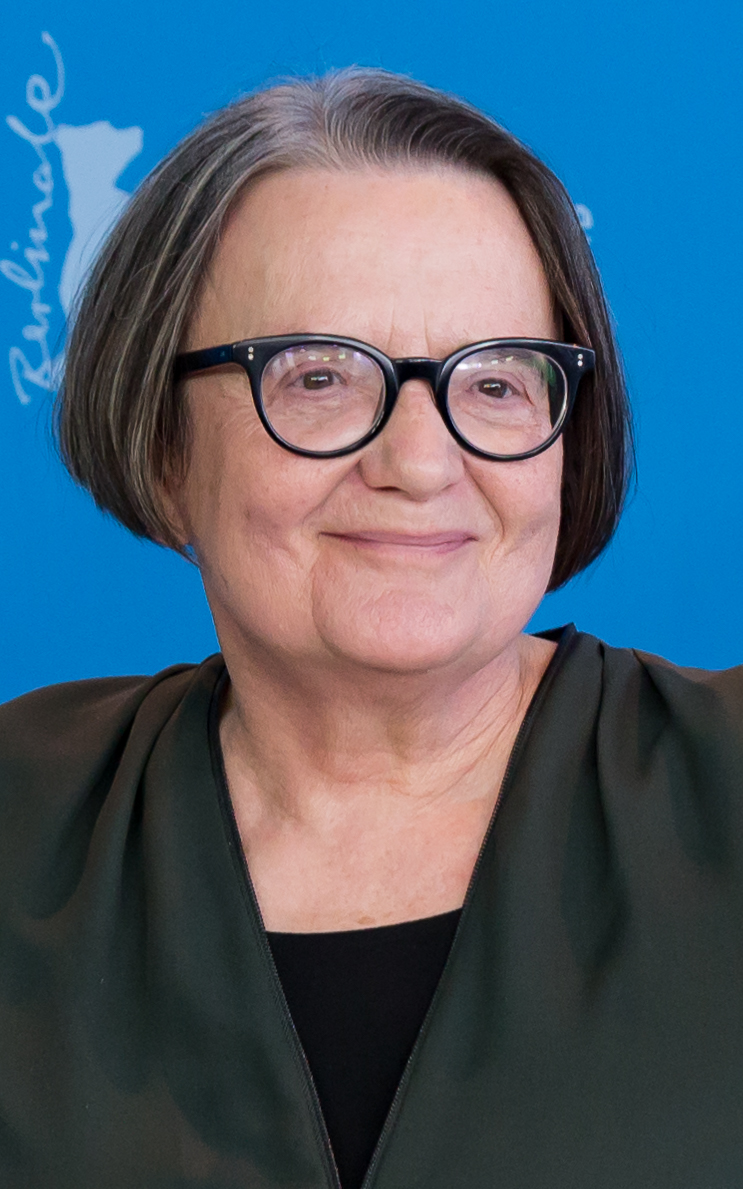
Agnieszka Holland, Best Foreign Language Film winner

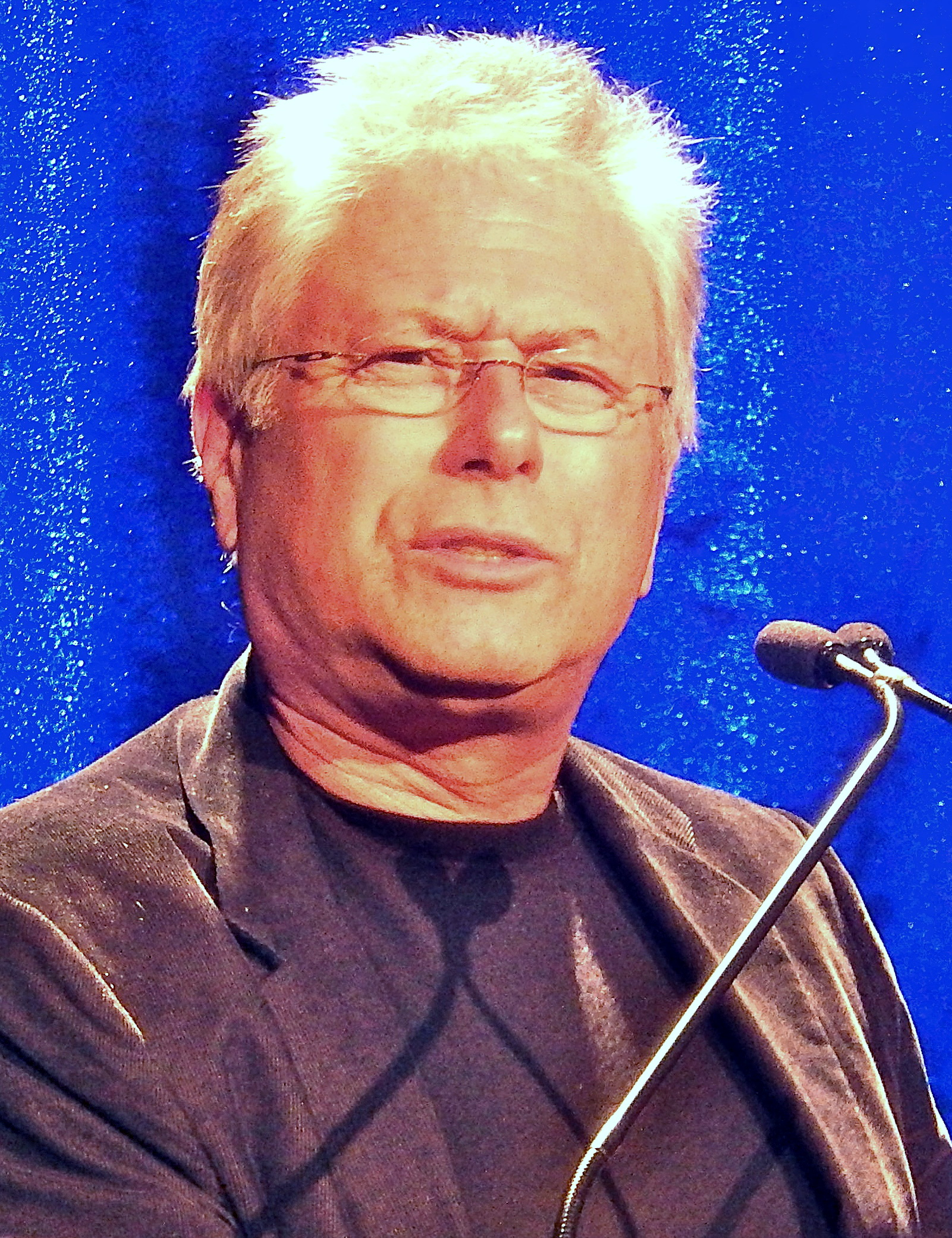
Alan Menken, Best Original Score winner

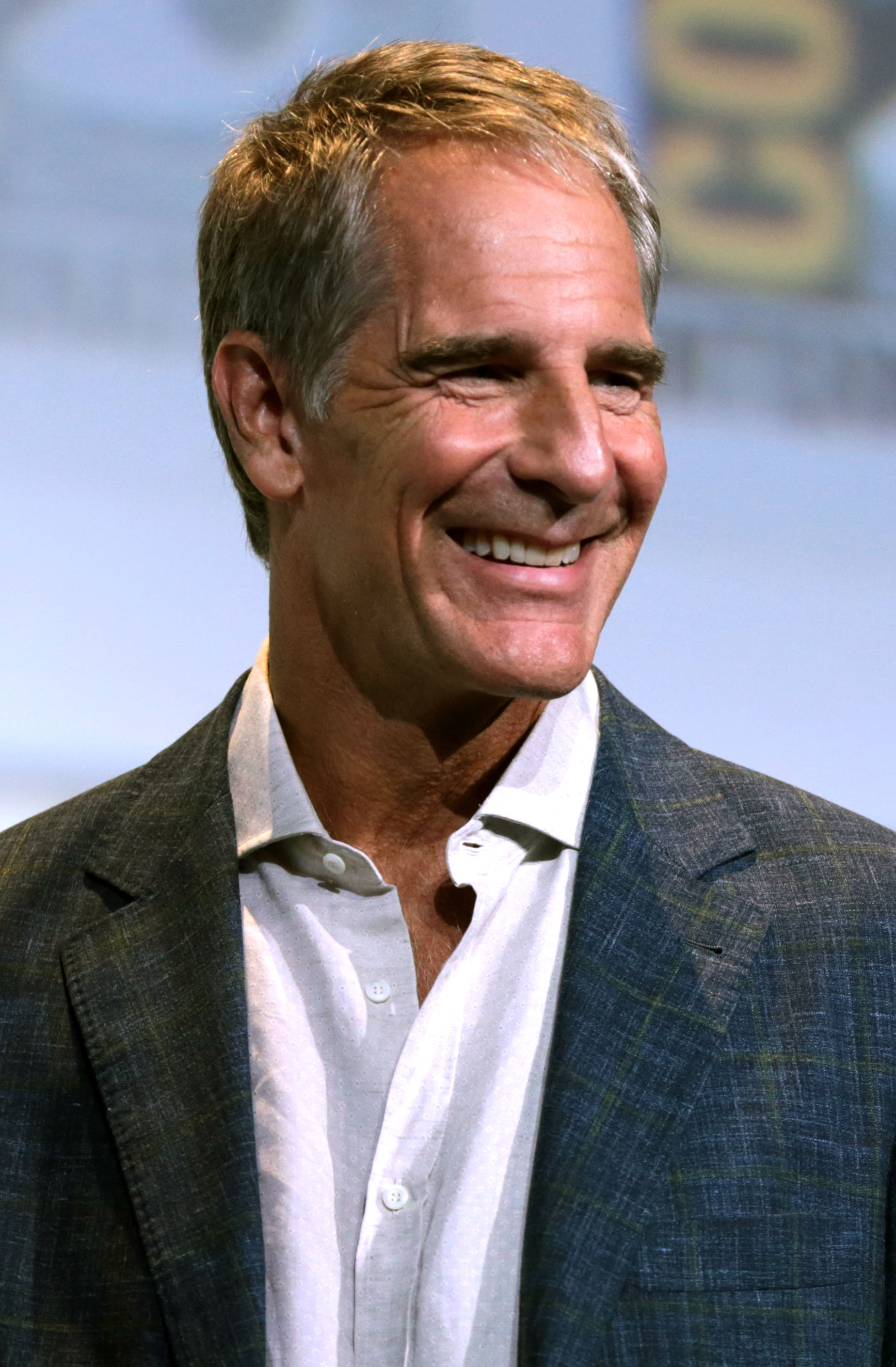
Scott Bakula, Best Actor – Drama Series winner

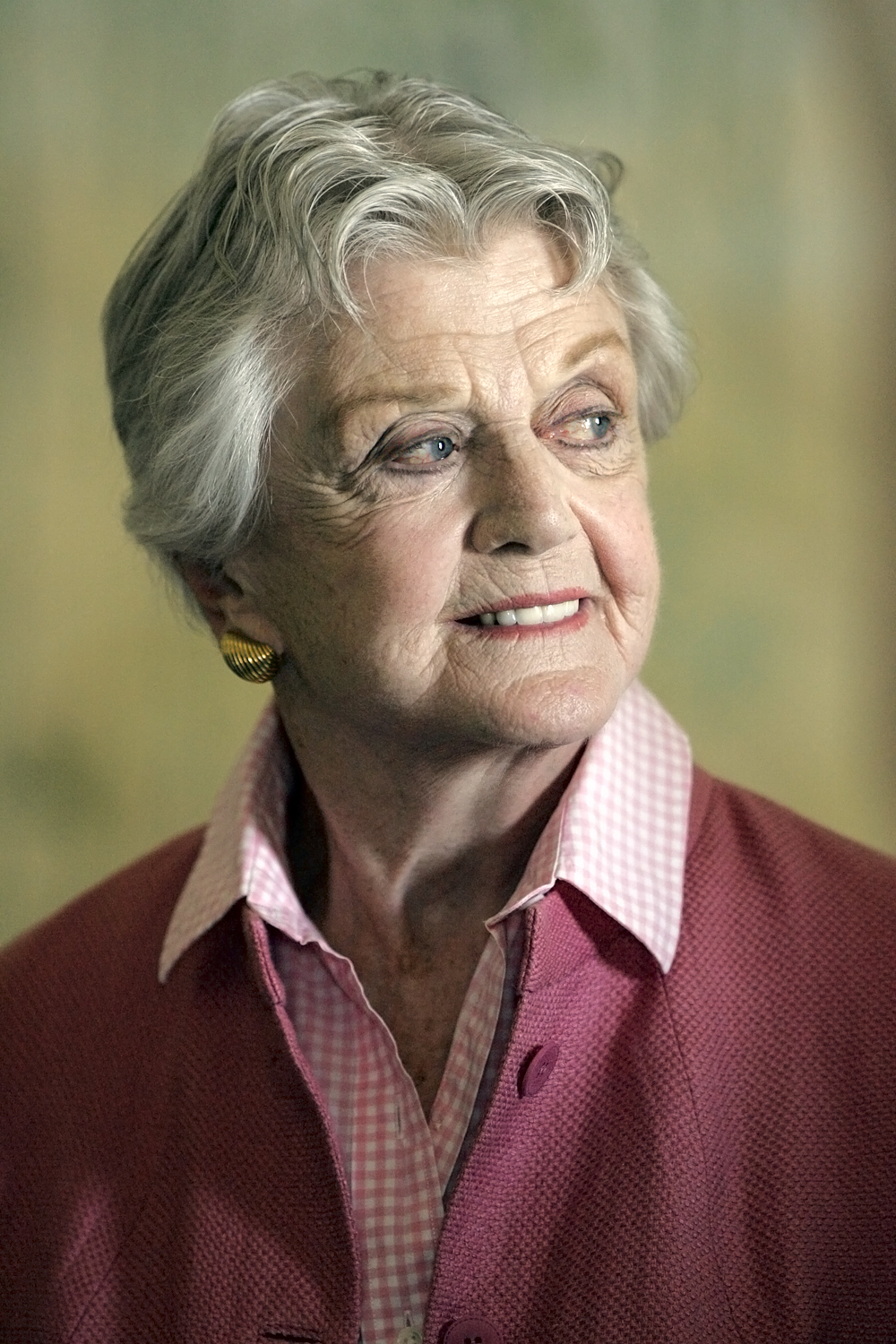
Angela Lansbury, Best Actress – Drama Series winner

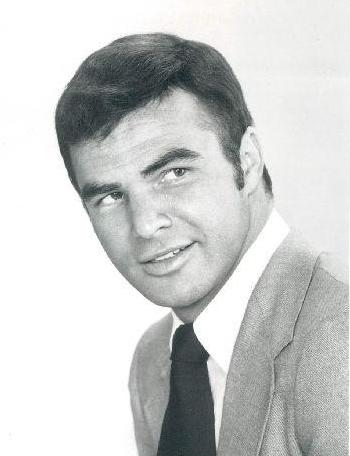
Burt Reynolds, Best Actor – Comedy or Musical Series winner

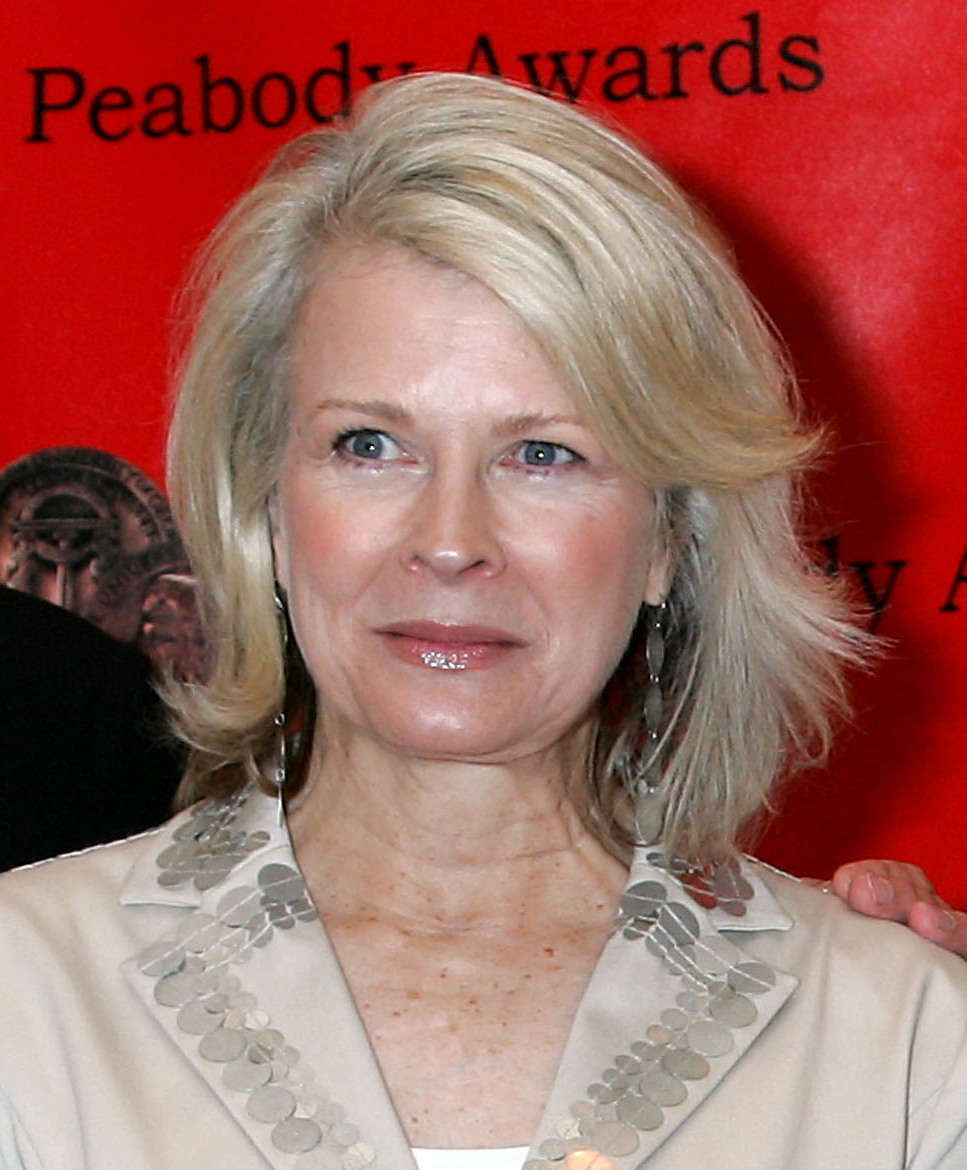
Candice Bergen, Best Actress – Comedy or Musical Series winner

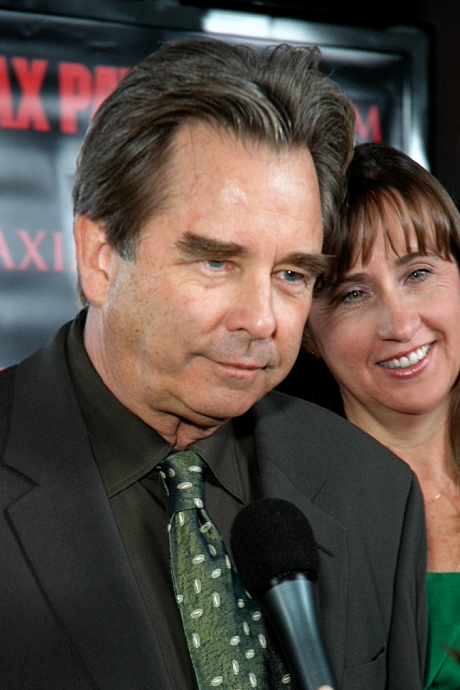
Beau Bridges, Best Actor – Miniseries or Television Movie winner

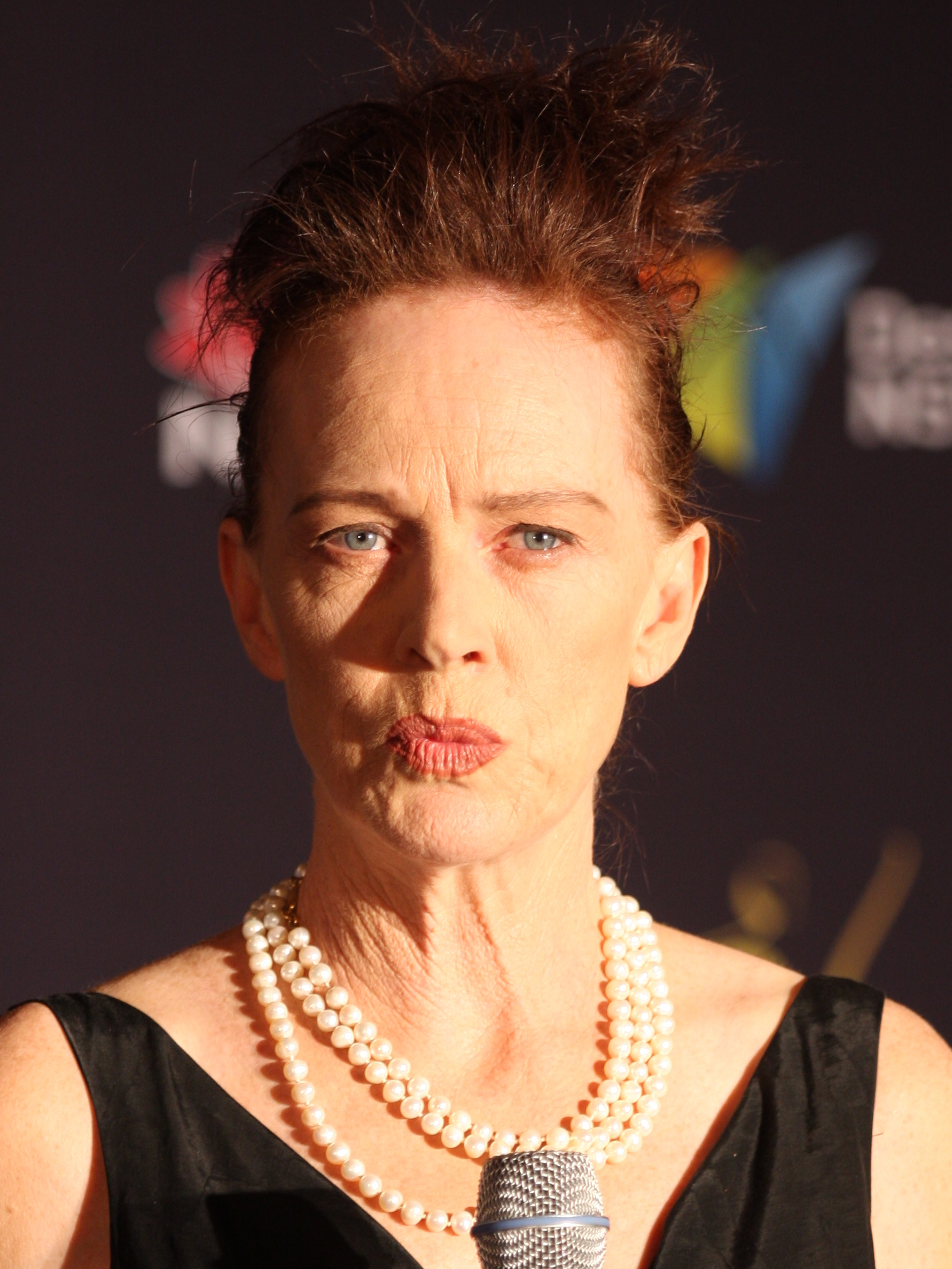
Judy Davis, Best Actress – Miniseries or Television Movie winner

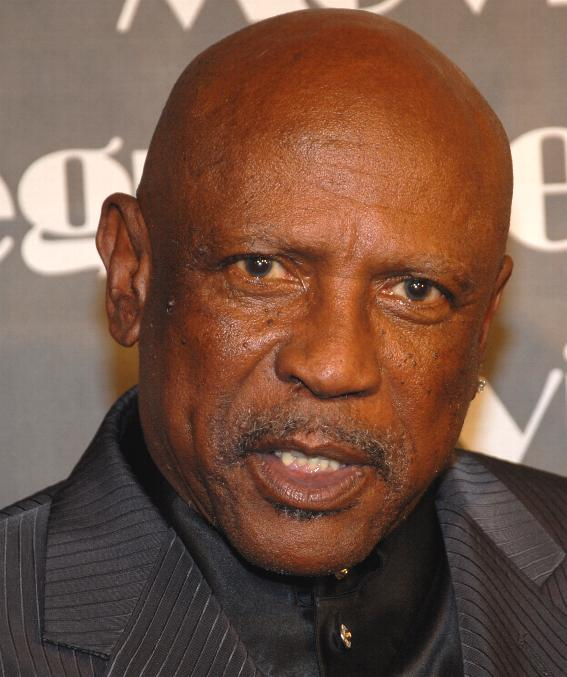
Louis Gossett Jr., Best Best Supporting Actor – Series, Miniseries or Television Film winner

=== Film ===
Best Motion Picture
Drama	Musical or Comedy
Bugsy: JFK; The Prince of Tides; The Silence of the Lambs; Thelma & Louise	Beauty and the Beast: City Slickers; The Commitments; The Fisher King; Fried Green Tomatoes
Best Performance in a Motion Picture – Drama
Actor	Actress
Nick Nolte – The Prince of Tides as Tom Wingo: Warren Beatty – Bugsy as Benjamin "Bugsy" Siegel; Kevin Costner – JFK as Jim Garrison; Robert De Niro – Cape Fear as Max Cady; Anthony Hopkins – The Silence of the Lambs as Hannibal Lecter	Jodie Foster – The Silence of the Lambs as Clarice Starling: Annette Bening – Bugsy as Virginia Hill; Geena Davis – Thelma & Louise as Thelma Dickinson; Laura Dern – Rambling Rose as Rose; Susan Sarandon – Thelma & Louise as Louise Sawyer
Best Performance in a Motion Picture – Musical or Comedy
Actor	Actress
Robin Williams – The Fisher King as Parry: Jeff Bridges – The Fisher King as Jack Lucas; Billy Crystal – City Slickers as Mitch Robbins; Dustin Hoffman – Hook as Captain Hook; Kevin Kline – Soapdish as Jeffrey Anderson	Bette Midler – For the Boys as Dixie Leonard: Ellen Barkin – Switch as Amanda Brooks; Kathy Bates – Fried Green Tomatoes as Evelyn Couch; Anjelica Huston – The Addams Family as Morticia Addams; Michelle Pfeiffer – Frankie and Johnny as Frankie
Best Supporting Performance in a Motion Picture – Drama, Musical or Comedy
Supporting Actor	Supporting Actress
Jack Palance – City Slickers as Curly Washburn: Ned Beatty – Hear My Song as Josef "Jo" Locke; John Goodman – Barton Fink as Charlie Meadows; Harvey Keitel – Bugsy as Mickey Cohen; Ben Kingsley – Bugsy as Meyer Lansky	Mercedes Ruehl – The Fisher King as Anne Napolitano: Nicole Kidman – Billy Bathgate as Drew Preston; Diane Ladd – Rambling Rose as Mrs. Hillyer; Juliette Lewis – Cape Fear as Danielle "Danny" Bowden; Jessica Tandy – Fried Green Tomatoes as Ninny Threadgoode
Best Director	Best Screenplay
Oliver Stone – JFK: Barry Levinson – Bugsy; Jonathan Demme – The Silence of the Lambs; Terry Gilliam – The Fisher King; Barbra Streisand – The Prince of Tides	Thelma & Louise – Callie Khouri: Bugsy – James Toback; Grand Canyon – Lawrence Kasdan and Meg Kasdan; JFK – Zachary Sklar and Oliver Stone; The Silence of the Lambs – Ted Tally
Best Original Score	Best Original Song
Beauty and the Beast – Alan Menken: At Play in the Fields of the Lord – Zbigniew Preisner; Bugsy – Ennio Morricone; Dead Again – Patrick Doyle; For the Boys – Dave Grusin; Robin Hood: Prince of Thieves – Michael Kamen	"Beauty and the Beast" performed by Peabo Bryson and Céline Dion – Beauty and the Beast: "Be Our Guest" performed by Angela Lansbury and Jerry Orbach – Beauty and the Beast; "Dreams to Dream" – An American Tail: Fievel Goes West; "(Everything I Do) I Do It for You" – Robin Hood: Prince of Thieves; "Tears in Heaven" performed by Eric Clapton – Rush
Best Foreign Language Film	
Europa, Europa, Germany: The Double Life of Véronique (La double vie de Véronique), France; High Heels (Tacones lejanos), Spain; Lost in Siberia (Zateryannyy v Sibiri), USSR; Madame Bovary, France; Nikita, France	

The following films received multiple nominations:

Nominations	Title
8	Bugsy
5	The Fisher King
5	The Silence of the Lambs
4	Beauty and the Beast
4	JFK
4	Thelma & Louise
3	City Slickers
3	Fried Green Tomatoes
3	The Prince of Tides
2	Cape Fear
2	For the Boys
2	Rambling Rose
2	Robin Hood: Prince of Thieves

The following films received multiple wins:

Wins	Title
3	Beauty and the Beast
2	The Fisher King

=== Television ===
Best Television Series
Best Series – Drama	Best Series – Comedy or Musical
Northern Exposure: Beverly Hills, 90210; I'll Fly Away; L.A. Law; Law & Order	Brooklyn Bridge: Cheers; Evening Shade; The Golden Girls; Murphy Brown
Best Lead Actor in a Television Series
Best Actor – Drama Series	Best Actor – Comedy or Musical Series
Scott Bakula – Quantum Leap: Mark Harmon – Reasonable Doubts; James Earl Jones – Pros & Cons; Rob Morrow – Northern Exposure; Carroll O'Connor – In the Heat of the Night; Sam Waterston – I'll Fly Away	Burt Reynolds – Evening Shade: Ted Danson – Cheers; Neil Patrick Harris – Doogie Howser, M.D.; Craig T. Nelson – Coach; Ed O'Neill – Married... with Children
Best Lead Actress in a Television Series
Best Actress – Drama Series	Best Actress – Comedy or Musical Series
Angela Lansbury – Murder, She Wrote: Susan Dey – L.A. Law; Sharon Gless – The Trials of Rosie O'Neill; Marlee Matlin – Reasonable Doubts; Janine Turner – Northern Exposure	Candice Bergen – Murphy Brown: Kirstie Alley – Cheers; Jamie Lee Curtis – Anything But Love; Roseanne Barr – Roseanne; Katey Sagal – Married... with Children
Best Supporting Performance – Series, Miniseries or Television Film
Best Supporting Actor – Series, Miniseries or Television Film	Best Supporting Actress – Series, Miniseries or Television Film
Louis Gossett Jr. – The Josephine Baker Story: Larry Drake – L.A. Law; Michael Jeter – Evening Shade; Richard Kiley – Separate but Equal; Dean Stockwell – Quantum Leap	Amanda Donohoe – L.A. Law: Sammi Davis – Homefront; Faith Ford – Murphy Brown; Estelle Getty – The Golden Girls; Park Overall – Empty Nest; Rhea Perlman – Cheers; Jean Stapleton – Fire in the Dark
Best Actor – Miniseries or Television Movie	Best Actress – Miniseries or Television Movie
Beau Bridges – Without Warning: The James Brady Story: Sam Elliott – Conagher; Peter Falk – Columbo and the Murder of a Rock Star; Sam Neill – One Against the Wind; Sidney Poitier – Separate but Equal	Judy Davis – One Against the Wind: Glenn Close – Sarah, Plain and Tall; Sally Kirkland – The Haunted; Jessica Tandy – The Story Lady; Lynn Whitfield – The Josephine Baker Story
Best Miniseries or Television Movie	
One Against the Wind: In a Child's Name; The Josephine Baker Story; Sarah, Plain and Tall; Separate But Equal	

The following programs received multiple nominations:

Nominations	Title
4	Cheers
4	L.A. Law
3	Evening Shade
3	Murphy Brown
3	One Against the Wind
3	The Josephine Baker Story
3	Northern Exposure
3	Separate but Equal
2	The Golden Girls
2	I'll Fly Away
2	The Josephine Baker Story
2	Married... with Children
2	Quantum Leap
2	Reasonable Doubts
2	Sarah, Plain and Tall

The following films and programs received multiple wins:

Wins	Title
2	One Against the Wind

== Ceremony ==
=== Presenters ===
- Kathy Bates
- Corbin Bernsen
- Michael Caine
- Bruce Davison
- Shannen Doherty
- Charles Durning
- Valeria Golino
- John Goodman
- Rutger Hauer
- Jeremy Irons
- Piper Laurie
- Jennifer Jason Leigh
- Kyle MacLachlan
- Kate Nelligan
- Luke Perry
- Jason Priestley
- Aidan Quinn
- Mimi Rogers
- Jane Russell
- Arnold Schwarzenegger
- Patricia Wettig

=== Cecil B. DeMille Award ===
Robert Mitchum

=== Miss Golden Globe ===
Joely Fisher (daughter of Connie Fisher & Eddie Fisher)

== Awards breakdown ==
The following networks received multiple nominations:

Nominations	Network
20	NBC
16	CBS
9	ABC
4	Fox
2	HBO

The following networks received multiple wins:

Wins	Network
2	CBS

== See also ==
- 64th Academy Awards
- 12th Golden Raspberry Awards
- 43rd Primetime Emmy Awards
- 44th Primetime Emmy Awards
- 45th British Academy Film Awards
- 46th Tony Awards
- 1991 in film
- 1991 in American television
