= The Fisher King =

1991 film by Terry Gilliam

- Theatrical release poster
- Directed by: Terry Gilliam
- Written by: Richard LaGravenese
- Produced by: Debra Hill; Lynda Obst
- Starring: Robin Williams; Jeff Bridges; Amanda Plummer; Mercedes Ruehl
- Cinematography: Roger Pratt
- Edited by: Lesley Walker
- Music by: George Fenton
- Production company: Hill/Obst Productions
- Distributed by: Tri-Star Pictures
- Release date: September 20, 1991
- Running time: 137 minutes
- Country: United States
- Language: English
- Budget: $24 million
- Box office: $72.4 million

The Fisher King is a 1991 American fantasy comedy drama film written by Richard LaGravenese and directed by Terry Gilliam. Starring Robin Williams and Jeff Bridges, with Mercedes Ruehl, Amanda Plummer and Michael Jeter, the film tells the story of a radio shock jock who tries to find redemption by helping a man whose life he inadvertently shattered. It explores "the intermingling of New York City's usually strictly separated social strata", and has been described as "a modern-day Grail Quest that fused New York romantic comedy with timeless fantasy".

The film was released in the United States by Tri-Star Pictures on September 20, 1991. It received generally favorable reviews from critics, and grossed $72 million on a $24 million budget. At the 64th Academy Awards, the film earned five nominations, including Best Actor for Williams and Best Original Screenplay for LaGravenese, with Ruehl winning Best Supporting Actress, making The Fisher King the only Oscar-winning film of Gilliam's career to date.

== Plot ==
Jack Lucas, a narcissistic, misanthropic radio shock jock, dismisses a disturbed regular caller, Edwin, over his infatuation with a woman he met at a Manhattan restaurant. Jack brashly describes his social circle as a vain enemy to people like Edwin that "must be stopped before it's too late." Meanwhile, Jack has an equally vain girlfriend, a high-rise penthouse apartment, and is being considered for the lead in a comedic TV pilot. While practicing a line read at home, he turns on a news report and discovers, to his horror, that his comments spurred Edwin to commit a mass murder–suicide at the restaurant that kills 7 people before killing himself.

Three years later, Jack works for his new girlfriend, Anne, in her video store. He is mostly drunk, depressed, and fearful of being recognized. One night, while on a bender, he is moments from suicide. Teenage punks attack him, nearly setting him on fire after mistaking him for a homeless person. Parry, a delusional homeless man, rescues Jack.

Parry claims cherubs have tasked him with finding the Holy Grail and tries to enlist Jack's help in retrieving it. He recounts the legend of God charging the Fisher King with finding the Grail, but the King receives an incapacitating wound for his sin of pride: "A Fool asks the King why he suffers, and when the King says he is thirsty, the Fool gives him a cup of water to drink. The King realizes the cup is the Grail and asks, 'How did you find what my brightest and bravest could not?' The Fool said, 'I don't know. I only knew that you were thirsty.'"

Jack is initially reluctant but agrees after learning his role in Parry's current condition. Parry, whose real name is Henry Sagan, had been a teacher at Hunter College. After witnessing his wife's death during Edwin's massacre, Henry suffered a psychotic break and became catatonic. Upon awakening, he assumed the persona of Parry and became obsessed with the Fisher King's legend. As Parry, reality panics him, and he is continually haunted by a hallucinatory Red Knight, born from a distorted memory of his wife's face exploding from a shotgun blast.

Jack seeks redemption by helping Parry find love again. Lydia, a shy woman Parry admires, is first sent a cabaret telegram performed by a homeless singer, inviting her to Anne's video store. There, she is encouraged to meet Parry and join Jack and Anne for dinner. Afterward, Parry walks Lydia home and declares his love, having observed her for months. She reciprocates, but Parry's new romance summons the Knight. Fleeing his vision, memories of his wife's murder, and his institutionalization, he is ambushed by the teenage punks. Beaten and knifed, Parry becomes catatonic again. Meanwhile, Jack, feeling whole after "saving" Parry, breaks up with Anne and decides to rebuild his career, although he then learns that Parry's condition continues to be grounded in the loss of his wife.

Jack experiences a crisis of conscience during a business meeting after ignoring the homeless cabaret singer's calls for help. He returns to see Parry, who is still catatonic. Determined to help his friend, he dons Parry's clothing, infiltrates the Upper East Side castle of a famous architect, and retrieves a trophy Parry believes to be the real Grail. During the theft, Jack finds the architect unconscious from a suicide attempt. He deliberately triggers the alarm while leaving, alerting authorities and saving the man's life.

Jack brings the "Grail" to Parry, who regains consciousness and says he is ready to miss his wife. Lydia, who has been frequently visiting Parry in the hospital, arrives to find him awake, leading the ward patients in a rendition of "How About You?" with Jack. Parry and Lydia embrace. Jack reconciles with Anne, professing his love; she slaps him, then grabs and kisses him. That night, Jack and Parry lie naked in Central Park, gazing at the clouds and a fireworks display over New York.

== Cast ==
- Robin Williams as Henry "Parry" Sagan
- Jeff Bridges as Jack Lucas
- Mercedes Ruehl as Anne Napolitano
- Amanda Plummer as Lydia Sinclair
- Christian Clemenson as Edwin Malnek
- Michael Jeter as Homeless Cabaret Singer
- David Hyde Pierce as Lou Rosen
- Lara Harris as Sondra
- Harry Shearer as Ben Starr
- William Jay Marshall as Jamaican Bum
- Chris Howell as the Red Knight
- Kathy Najimy as Crazed Video Customer
- John de Lancie as TV Executive
- Tom Waits as Disabled Veteran
- Melinda Culea as Sitcom Wife
- Paul Michael Lombardi as Radio Engineer
- Ted Ross as Limo Bum
- Carlos Carrasco as Doctor

== Production ==
Richard LaGravenese had to jettison his initial draft after finding it was too similar to Rain Man. Jack Lucas was a "cynical cab driver" before LaGravanese had an epiphany after listening to The Howard Stern Show which caused him to change Lucas to a DJ.

Gilliam stated he was motivated to make this film after the experience of his previous movie, The Adventures of Baron Munchausen. That film, a big-budget special-effects production, had gone significantly over budget, costing more than $45 million—nearly double the $24 million budget of The Fisher King. This project also marked two firsts for Gilliam: it was the first film he directed without being involved in writing the screenplay, and his first not to feature any other members of Monty Python.

Also per The Directors, Gilliam conceived the scene where Robin Williams shadows Amanda Plummer through a waltzing crowd in Grand Central Terminal. He felt the original scene, written by LaGravenese, in which a homeless woman's beautiful singing voice fills a crowded subway, was not working. Gilliam initially hesitated to change it, wanting to remain faithful to the script and concerned the waltz would make the film feel too much like "a Terry Gilliam film". The scene was ultimately shot in a single night using a mix of professional extras and actual train passengers.

Jeff Bridges later said Gilliam allowed Robin Williams carte blanche to engage in comedy between takes.

== Reception ==
=== Box office ===
The film did moderately well at the box office, with a gross of almost $42 million in the United States and Canada, and an international gross of $30.5 million, for a worldwide total of $72.4 million.

=== Critical response ===
On Rotten Tomatoes, The Fisher King has an approval rating of 83%, based on 66 reviews, with an average rating of 7.2/10. The site's critics' consensus reads: "An odd but affecting mixture of drama, comedy and fantasy, The Fisher King manages to balance moving performances from Robin Williams and Jeff Bridges with director Terry Gilliam's typically askew universe." On Metacritic, the film has a weighted average score of 67 out of 100, based on nine critics, indicating "generally favorable reviews". Audiences surveyed by CinemaScore gave the film a grade of "B+" on scale of A+ to F.

Peter Travers of Rolling Stone wrote that the film "sweeps you up on waves of humor, heartbreak and ravishing romance".

John Simon of the National Review described The Fisher King as "one of the most nonsensical, pretentious, mawkishly cloying movies I ever had to wretch[sic] through".

Following Robin Williams's death, a reappraisal of the film on RogerEbert.com said that "no Williams film can hit harder—or be so fully consoling in such heartbreaking circumstances—than The Fisher King", in which his character "gradually simmers to a boil of bristling insecurities, terror and agonizing internalized pain".

== Accolades ==
Award	Category	Nominee(s)	Result	Ref.
Academy Awards	Best Actor	Robin Williams	Nominated	
Academy Awards	Best Supporting Actress	Mercedes Ruehl	Won	
Academy Awards	Best Original Screenplay	Richard LaGravenese	Nominated	
Academy Awards	Best Production Design	Art Direction: Mel Bourne; Set Decoration: Cindy Carr	Nominated	
Academy Awards	Best Original Score	George Fenton	Nominated	
American Comedy Awards	Funniest Actor in a Motion Picture (Leading Role)	Robin Williams	Nominated	
American Comedy Awards	Funniest Supporting Actress in a Motion Picture	Mercedes Ruehl	Won	
Artios Awards	Outstanding Achievement in Casting – Comedy	Howard Feuer	Won	
Boston Society of Film Critics Awards	Best Supporting Actress	Mercedes Ruehl	Won	
British Academy Film Awards	Best Actress in a Supporting Role	Amanda Plummer	Nominated	
British Academy Film Awards	Best Original Screenplay	Richard LaGravenese	Nominated	
Chicago Film Critics Association Awards	Best Director	Terry Gilliam	Nominated	
Chicago Film Critics Association Awards	Best Supporting Actress	Amanda Plummer	Nominated	
Chicago Film Critics Association Awards	Best Supporting Actress	Mercedes Ruehl	Won	
Dallas–Fort Worth Film Association Awards	Best Film		Nominated	
Dallas–Fort Worth Film Association Awards	Best Actor	Robin Williams	Nominated	
Dallas–Fort Worth Film Association Awards	Best Supporting Actress	Amanda Plummer	Nominated	
Dallas–Fort Worth Film Association Awards	Best Supporting Actress	Mercedes Ruehl	Won	
Golden Globe Awards	Best Motion Picture – Musical or Comedy		Nominated	
Golden Globe Awards	Best Actor in a Motion Picture – Musical or Comedy	Jeff Bridges	Nominated	
Golden Globe Awards	Best Actor in a Motion Picture – Musical or Comedy	Robin Williams	Won	
Golden Globe Awards	Best Supporting Actress – Motion Picture	Mercedes Ruehl	Won	
Golden Globe Awards	Best Director	Terry Gilliam	Nominated	
Guldbagge Awards	Best Foreign Film		Nominated	
Los Angeles Film Critics Association Awards	Best Film		Runner-up	
Los Angeles Film Critics Association Awards	Best Director	Terry Gilliam	Runner-up	
Los Angeles Film Critics Association Awards	Best Supporting Actress	Amanda Plummer	Runner-up	
Los Angeles Film Critics Association Awards	Best Supporting Actress	Mercedes Ruehl	Won	
Los Angeles Film Critics Association Awards	Best Screenplay	Richard LaGravenese	Runner-up	
Saturn Awards	Best Fantasy Film		Nominated	
Saturn Awards	Best Actor	Jeff Bridges	Nominated	
Saturn Awards	Best Actor	Robin Williams	Nominated	
Saturn Awards	Best Supporting Actress	Mercedes Ruehl	Won	
Saturn Awards	Best Director	Terry Gilliam	Nominated	
Saturn Awards	Best Writing	Richard LaGravenese	Nominated	
Saturn Awards	Best Costumes	Beatrix Aruna Pasztor	Nominated	
Toronto Film Critics Association Awards	People's Choice Award	Terry Gilliam	Won	
Turkish Film Critics Association Awards	Best Foreign Film		6th Place	
Venice International Film Festival	Golden Lion	Terry Gilliam	Nominated	
Venice International Film Festival	Little Golden Lion	Terry Gilliam	Won	
Venice International Film Festival	Silver Lion	Terry Gilliam	Won (Note: Tied with Philippe Garrel for J'entends plus la guitare and Yimou Zhang for Raise the Red Lantern.)	
Venice International Film Festival	Best Actress (Pasinetti Award)	Mercedes Ruehl	Won	
Writers Guild of America Awards	Best Screenplay – Written Directly for the Screen	Richard LaGravenese	Nominated	

== Home media ==
=== Laserdisc ===
The film was released on VHS and LaserDisc by Columbia TriStar Home Video in 1992. The first Laserdisc release was a fullscreen presentation, but showed more vertical information while cropping horizontally. The second release in 1997 presented the film in its 1.85:1 theatrical ratio. The Criterion Collection released their Laserdisc version in 1993 with several extras that have not surfaced on any other release (until Criterion's own DVD and Blu-ray releases of the film), and a director-approved widescreen transfer in 1.66:1.

=== DVD and Blu-ray ===
The film was released on DVD in 1999 by Columbia TriStar Home Video, using the same master as the 1997 Laserdisc release, with only the theatrical trailer as a special feature. In 2011, Image Entertainment released the film on Blu-ray, utilizing a new high-definition master in the 1.85:1 theatrical ratio, with Dolby Digital Tru-HD 5.1 surround, with no special features.

On June 23, 2015, The Criterion Collection re-released the film on Blu-ray and DVD, featuring a brand new 2K transfer and DTS-HD 5.1 surround sound mix.

On April 11, 2023, Criterion again released the film on 4K Ultra HD Blu-ray, featuring a brand new 4K restoration approved by Terry Gilliam.

== See also ==
- List of films based on Arthurian legend
