= 1991 Los Angeles Film Critics Association Awards =

Annual US film awards ceremony

17th LAFCA Awards
- Date: December 14, 1991

Highlights
- Best Picture: Bugsy

The 17th Los Angeles Film Critics Association Awards were announced on 14 December 1991 and given on 21 January 1992.

== Winners ==
- Best Picture:
  - Bugsy
  - Runner-up: The Fisher King
- Best Director:
  - Barry Levinson – Bugsy
  - Runner-up: Terry Gilliam – The Fisher King
- Best Actor:
  - Nick Nolte – The Prince of Tides
  - Runner-up: Warren Beatty – Bugsy
- Best Actress:
  - Mercedes Ruehl – The Fisher King
  - Runner-up: Jodie Foster – The Silence of the Lambs
- Best Supporting Actor:
  - Michael Lerner – Barton Fink
  - Runner-up: Robert Duvall – Rambling Rose
- Best Supporting Actress:
  - Jane Horrocks – Life Is Sweet
  - Runner-up: Amanda Plummer – The Fisher King
- Best Screenplay:
  - James Toback – Bugsy
  - Runner-up: Richard LaGravenese – The Fisher King
- Best Cinematography:
  - Roger Deakins – Barton Fink and Homicide
  - Runner-up: John J. Campbell and Eric Alan Edwards – My Own Private Idaho
- Best Music Score:
  - Zbigniew Preisner – The Double Life of Veronique (La double vie de Véronique), At Play in the Fields of the Lord and Europa Europa
  - Runner-up: Howard Shore – The Silence of the Lambs and Naked Lunch
- Best Foreign Film:
  - La Belle Noiseuse • France/Switzerland
  - Runner-up: Europa Europa • Germany/France/Poland
- Best Non-Fiction Film:
  - American Dream
- Best Animation:
  - Beauty and the Beast
- Experimental/Independent Film/Video Award:
  - Jon Jost – All the Vermeers in New York
- New Generation Award:
  - John Singleton – Boyz n the Hood
- Career Achievement Award (tie):
  - Elmer Bernstein
  - Vincent Price
- Special Citation:
  - The National Film Board of Canada on the 50th anniversary of its animation unit.
