= 64th Academy Awards =

- Official poster by Dana Duncan
- Date: March 30, 1992
- Site: Dorothy Chandler Pavilion; Los Angeles, California, U.S.
- Hosted by: Billy Crystal
- Produced by: Gil Cates
- Directed by: Jeff Margolis

Highlights
- Best Picture: The Silence of the Lambs
- Most awards: The Silence of the Lambs (5)
- Most nominations: Bugsy (10)

TV in the United States
- Network: ABC
- Duration: 3 hours, 33 minutes
- Ratings: 44.44 million 29.84% (Nielsen ratings)

The 64th Academy Awards ceremony, presented by the Academy of Motion Picture Arts and Sciences (AMPAS), honored the best films of 1991 in the United States and took place on March 30, 1992, at the Dorothy Chandler Pavilion in Los Angeles beginning at 6:00 p.m. PST / 9:00 p.m. EST. During the ceremony, the Academy of Motion Picture Arts and Sciences presented Academy Awards (commonly referred to as Oscars) in 23 categories. The ceremony, televised in the United States by ABC, was produced by Gil Cates and directed by Jeff Margolis. Actor Billy Crystal hosted the show for the third consecutive year. Three weeks earlier, in a ceremony held at the Century Plaza Hotel in Los Angeles on March 7, the Academy Awards for Technical Achievement were presented by host Tom Hanks.

The Silence of the Lambs won five awards, including Best Picture. Other winners included Terminator 2: Judgment Day with four awards, Beauty and the Beast, Bugsy, and JFK with two, and City Slickers, Deadly Deception: General Electric, Nuclear Weapons and Our Environment, The Fisher King, In the Shadow of the Stars, Manipulation, Mediterraneo, Session Man, and Thelma & Louise with one. The telecast garnered more than 44 million viewers in the United States.

== Winners and nominees ==
The nominees for the 64th Academy Awards were announced on February 19, 1992, at 5:38 a.m. PST (13:38 UTC) at the Samuel Goldwyn Theater in Beverly Hills, California, by Karl Malden, president of the Academy, and actress Kathleen Turner. Bugsy led all nominees with ten nominations; JFK came in second with eight.

The winners were announced during the awards ceremony on March 30, 1992. The Silence of the Lambs became the first horror film to win Best Picture and the first film to be released on home video prior to winning that award. Moreover, it was the third film to win the "Big Five" major categories for picture, directing, lead acting performances, and screenwriting. The other two films to achieve this feat were 1934's It Happened One Night and 1975's One Flew Over the Cuckoo's Nest. Beauty and the Beast became the first animated film to be nominated for Best Picture and the first film with three nominations for Best Original Song. Boyz n the Hood's John Singleton became the first African-American to be nominated for Best Director and the youngest nominee in that category. Nominated for Best Supporting Actress and Best Actress, respectively, Diane Ladd and Laura Dern became the first mother and daughter nominated in the same year.

=== Awards ===
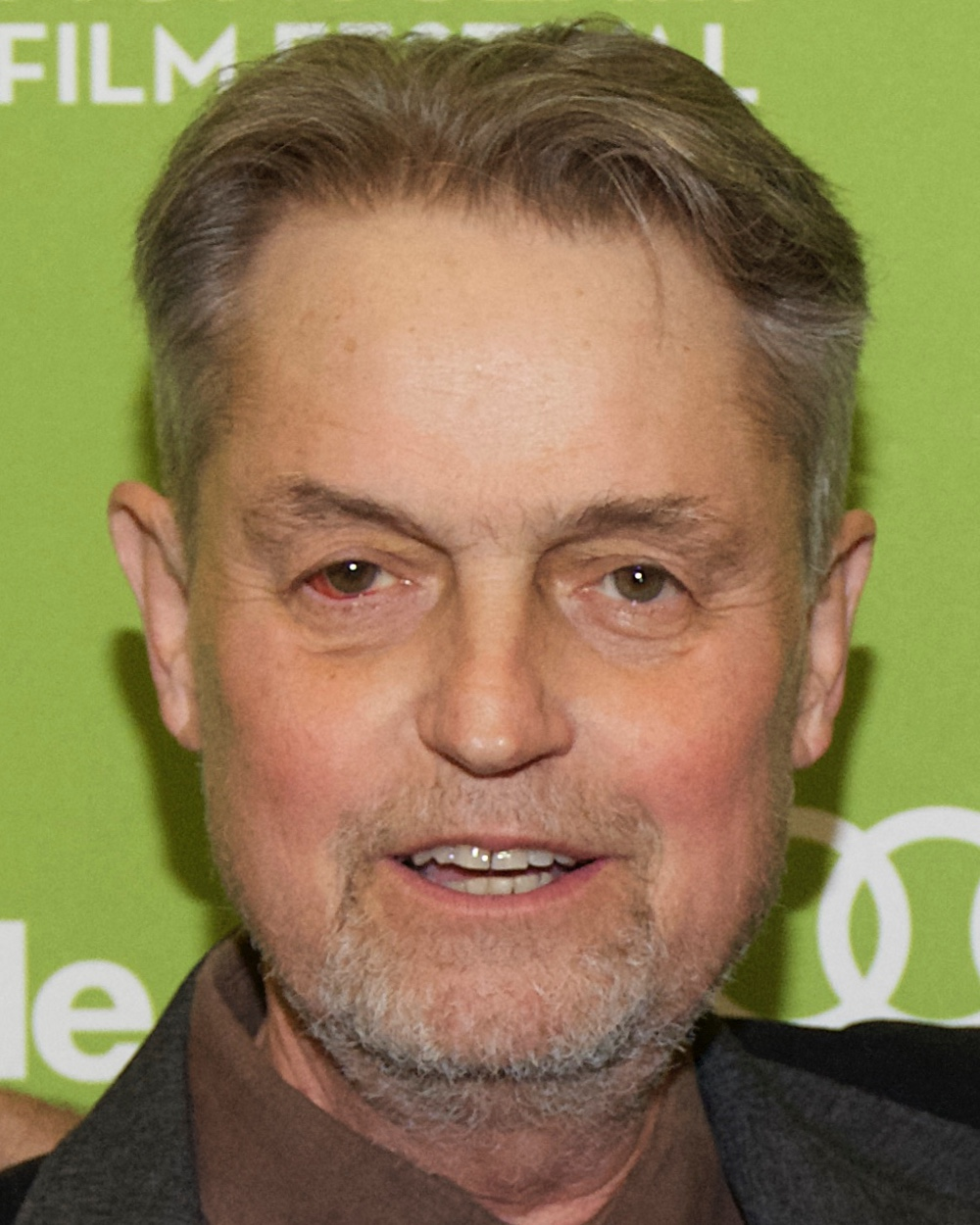
Jonathan Demme, Best Director winner

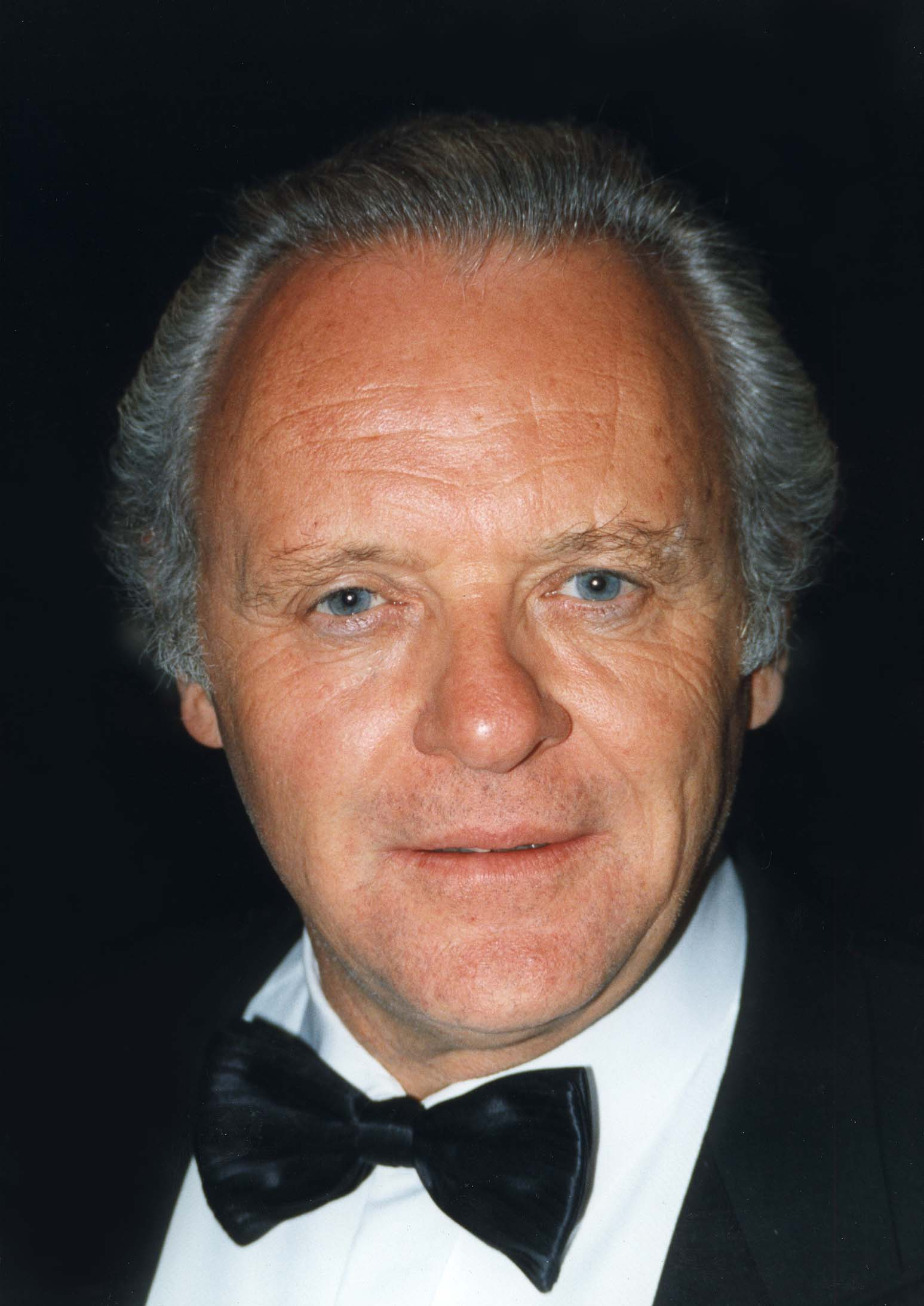
Anthony Hopkins, Best Actor winner

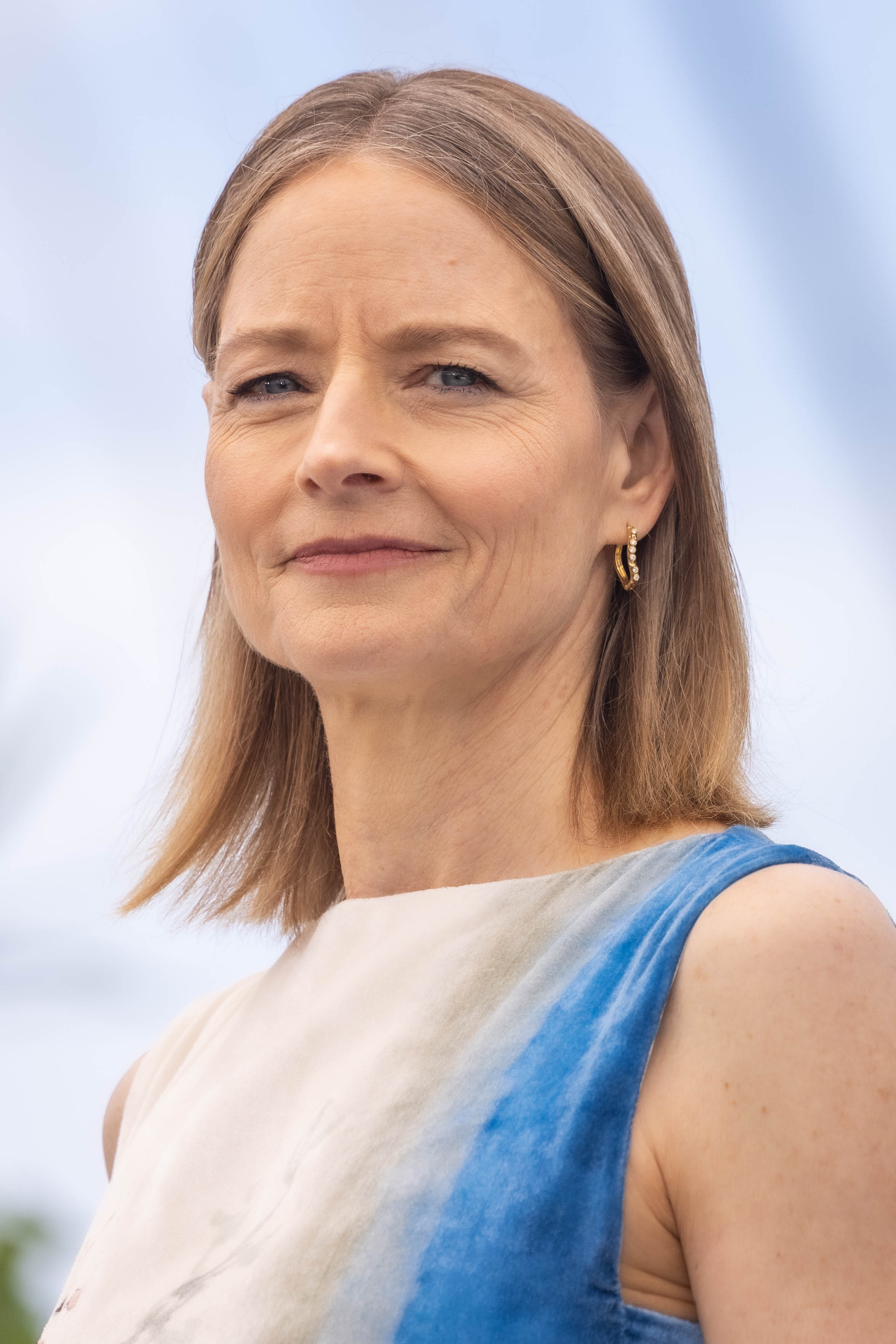
Jodie Foster, Best Actress winner

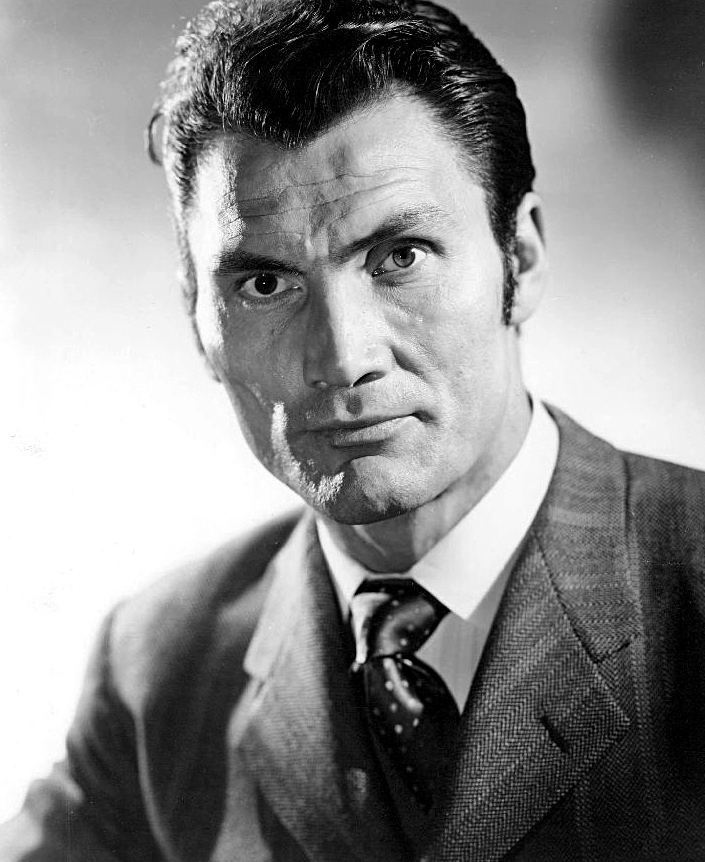
Jack Palance, Best Supporting Actor winner

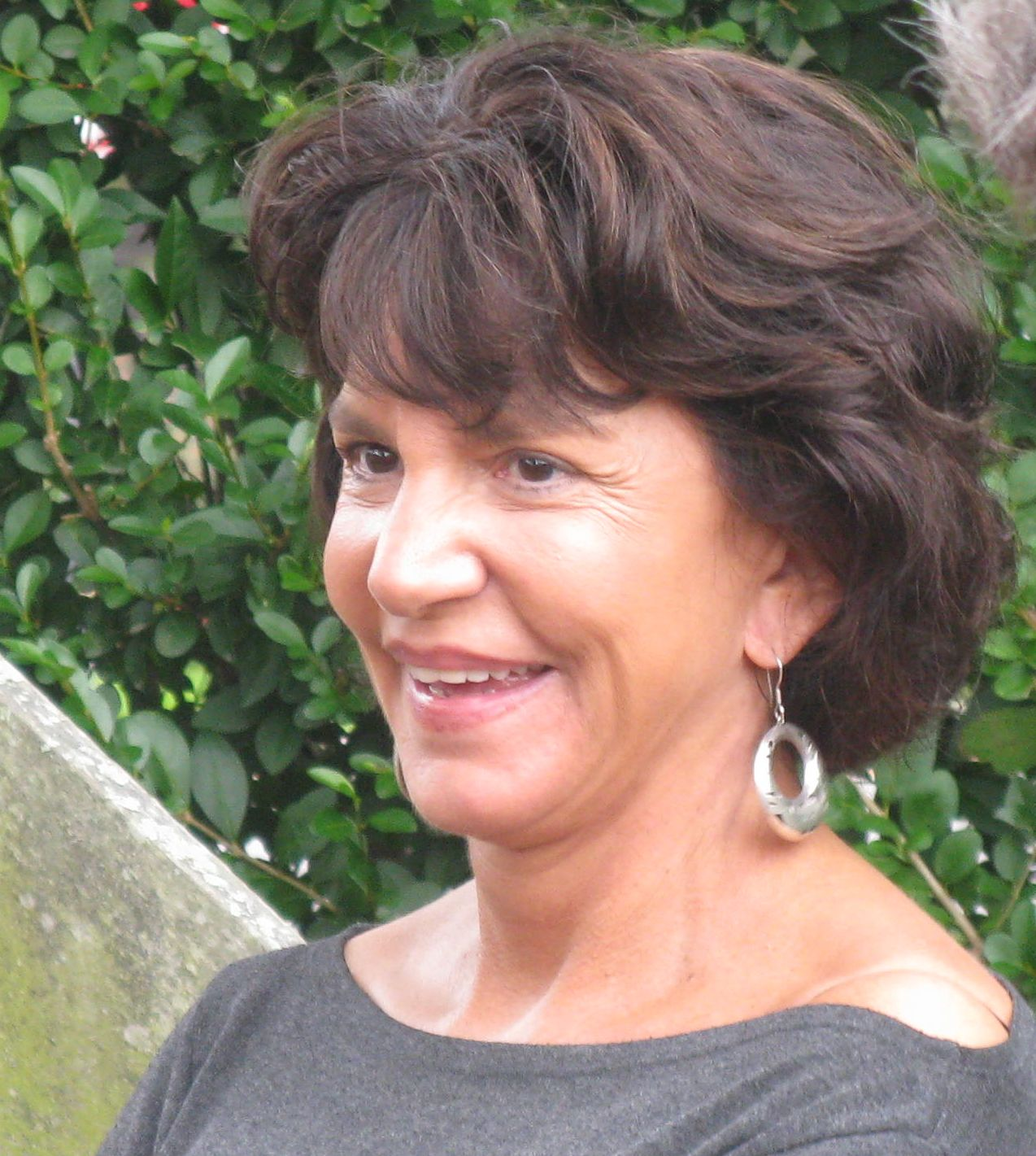
Mercedes Ruehl, Best Supporting Actress winner

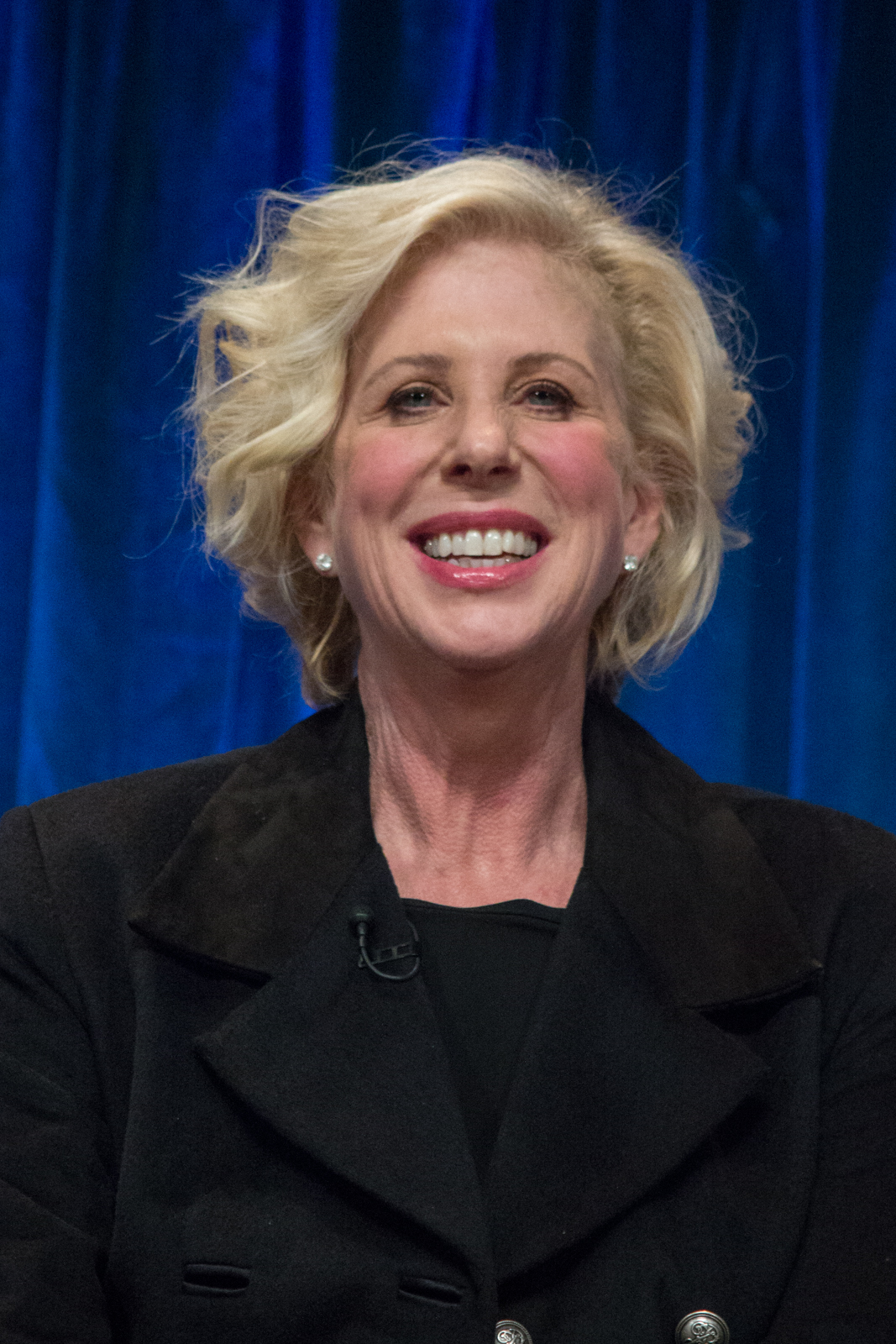
Callie Khouri, Best Original Screenplay winner

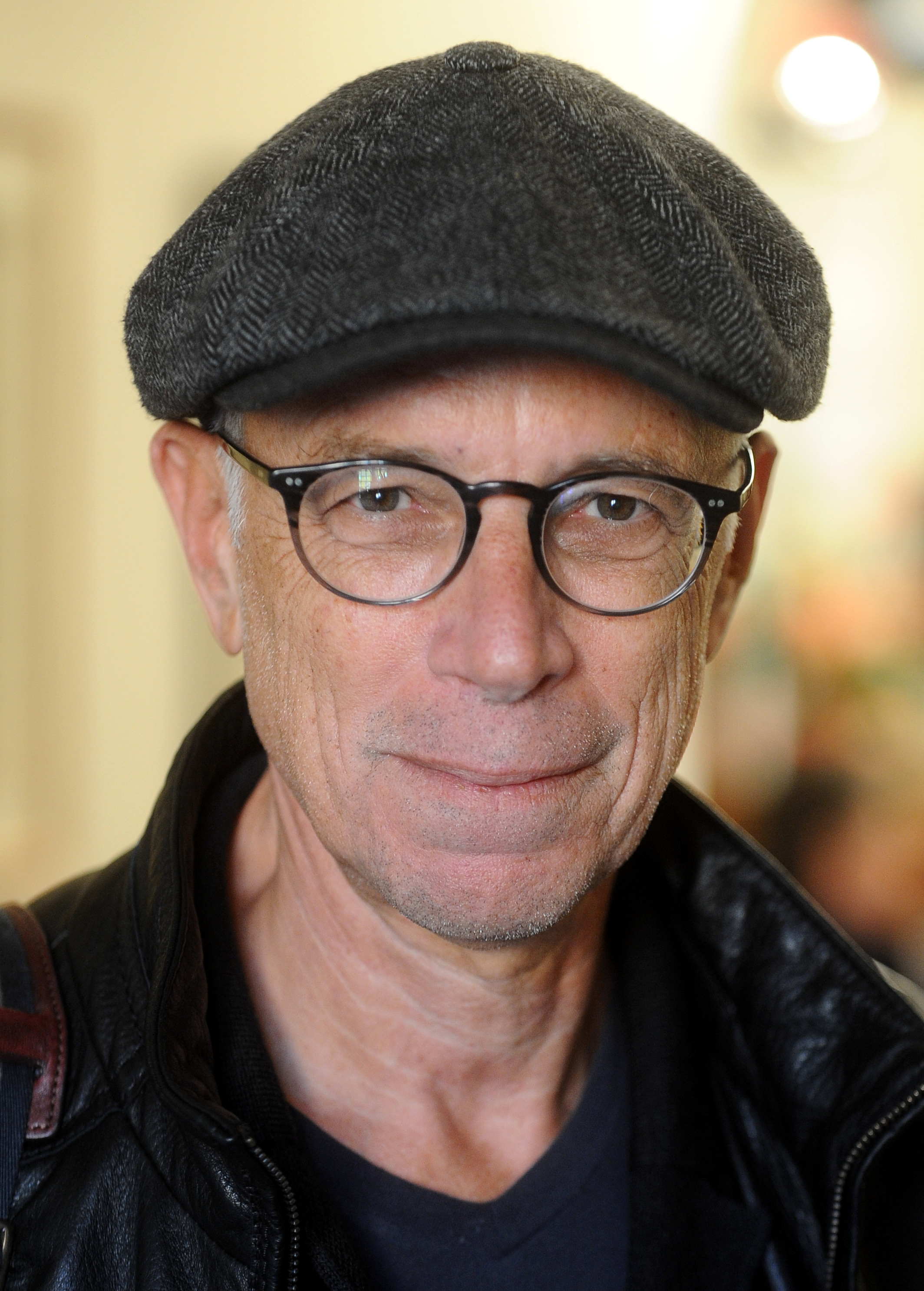
Gabriele Salvatores, Best Foreign Language Film winner

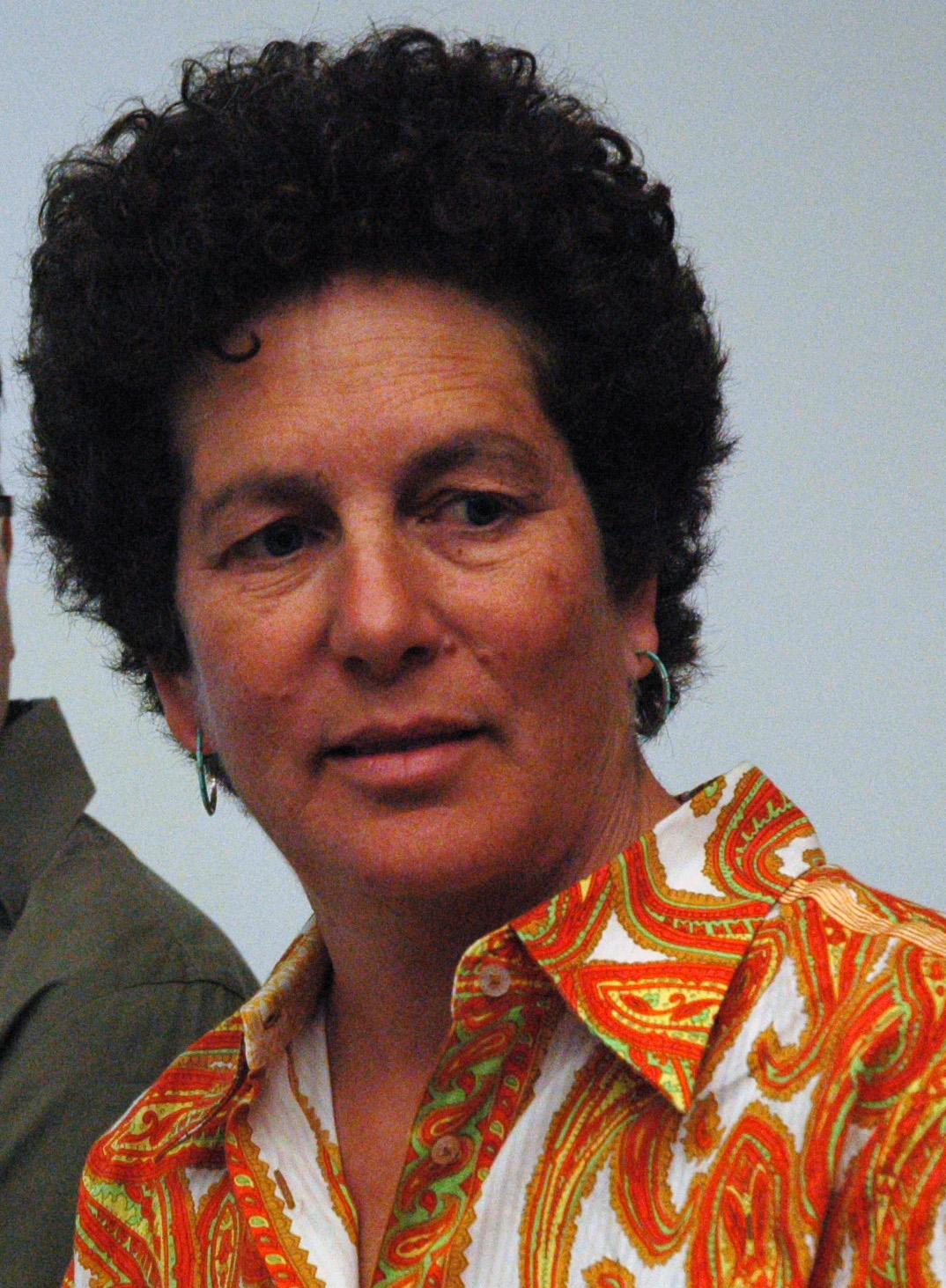
Debra Chasnoff, Best Documentary Short Subject winner

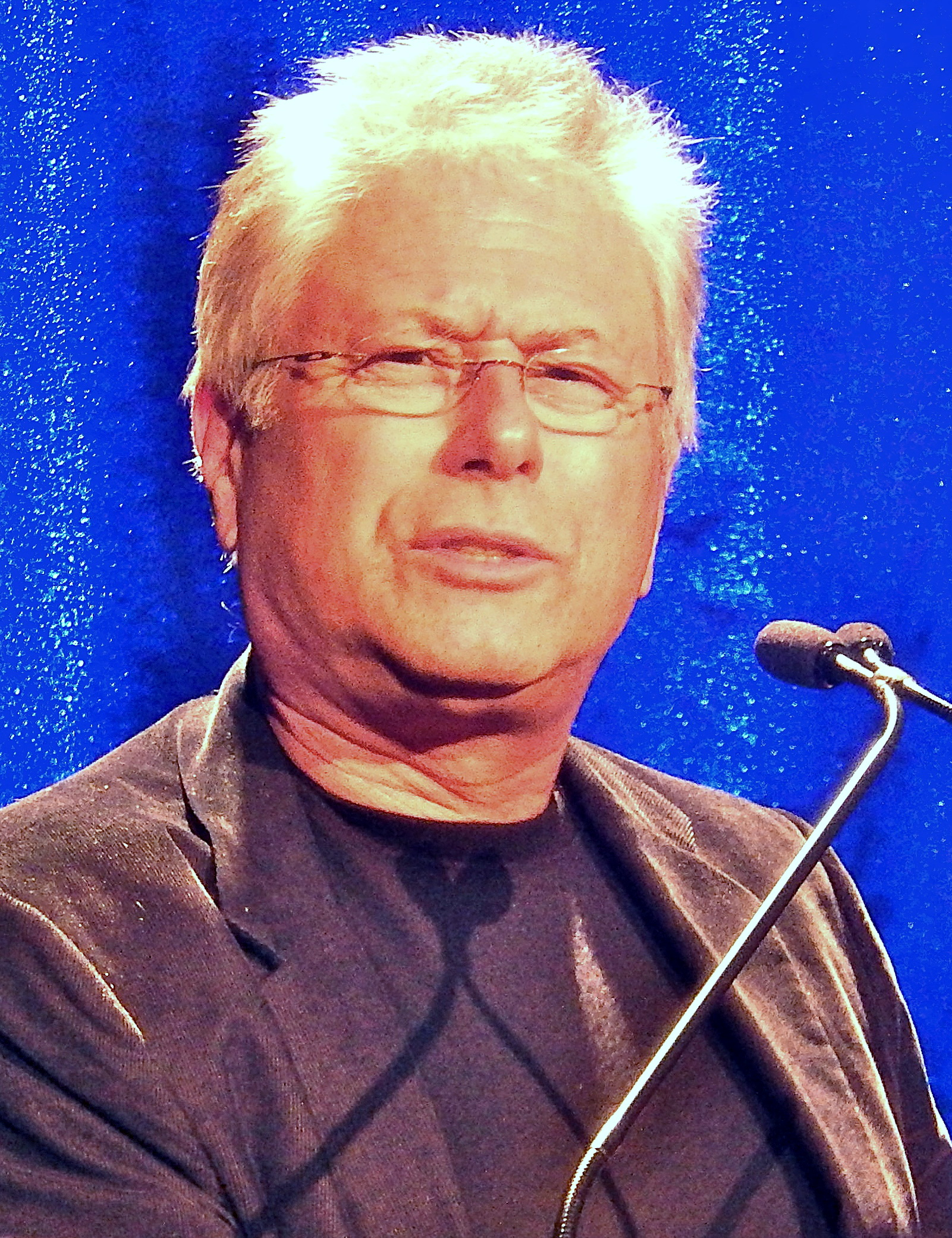
Alan Menken, Best Original Score winner and Best Original Song co-winner

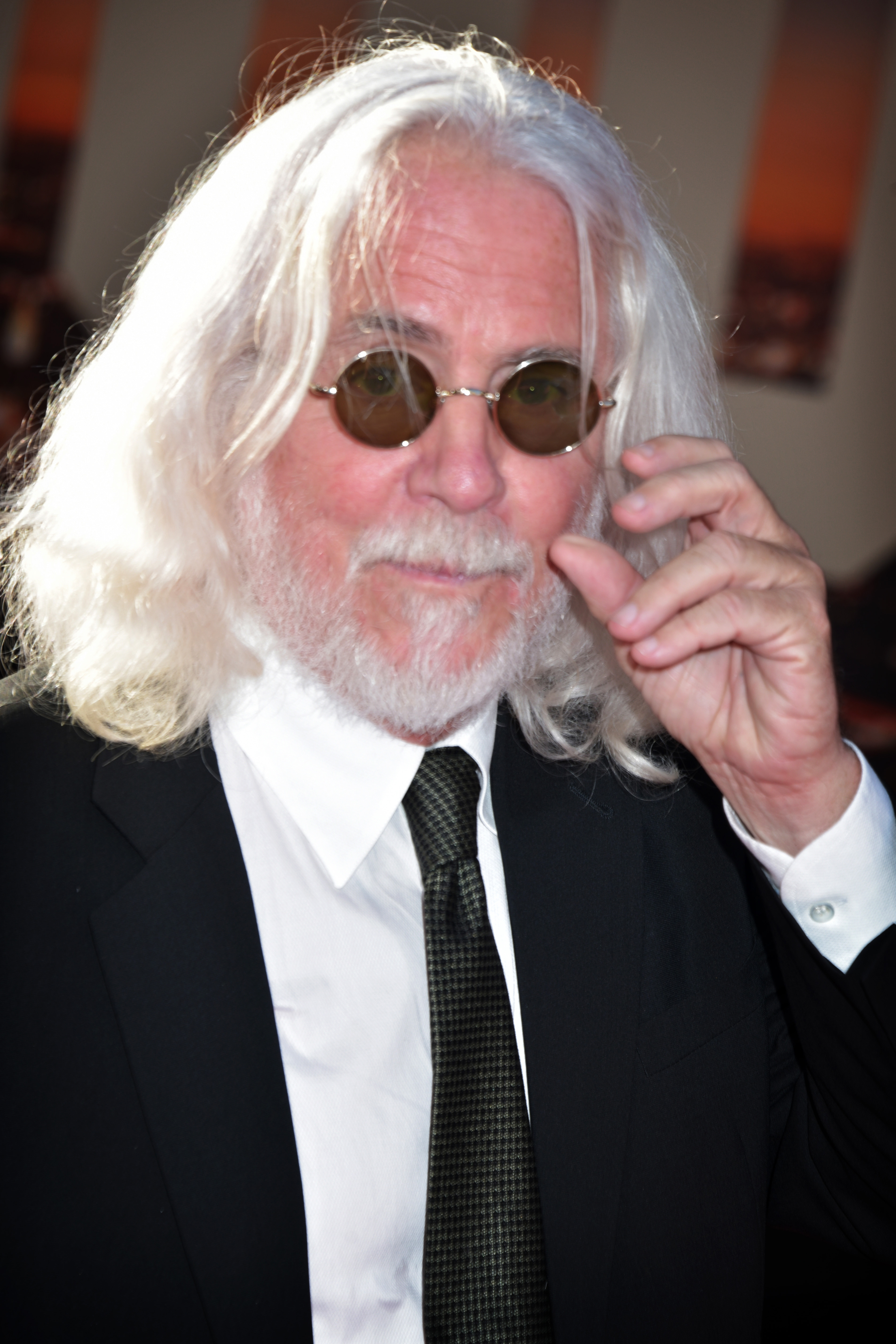
Robert Richardson, Best Cinematography winner

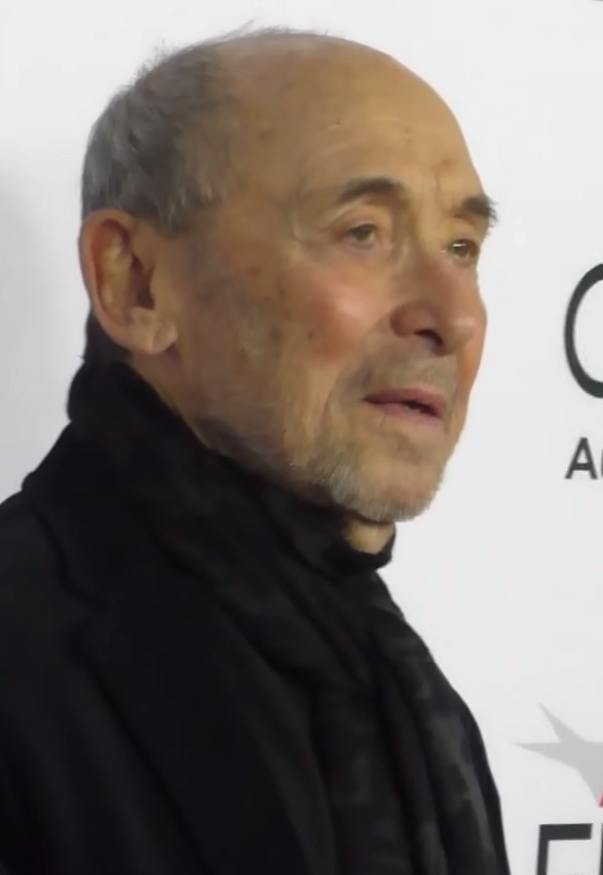
Albert Wolsky, Best Costume Design winner

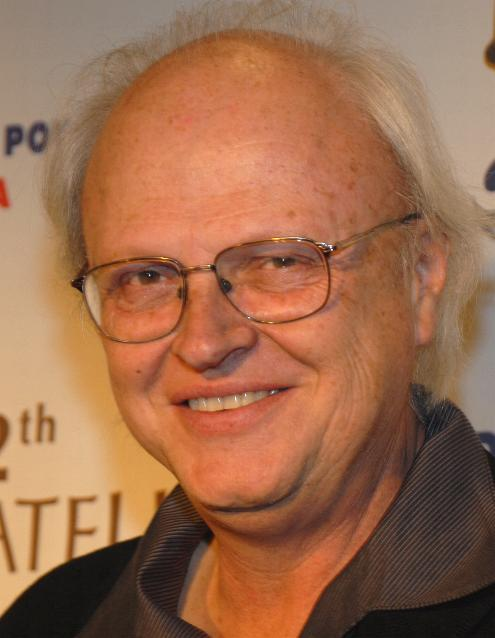
Dennis Muren, Best Visual Effects co-winner

Winners are listed first, highlighted in boldface, and indicated with a double dagger (‡).

**Best Picture**: **The Silence of the Lambs – Edward Saxon, Kenneth Utt and Ron Bozman, producers**‡; Beauty and the Beast – Don Hahn, producer; Bugsy – Mark Johnson, Barry Levinson and Warren Beatty, producers; JFK – A. Kitman Ho and Oliver Stone, producers; The Prince of Tides – Barbra Streisand and Andrew S. Karsch, producers	**Best Directing**: **Jonathan Demme – The Silence of the Lambs**‡; John Singleton – Boyz n the Hood; Barry Levinson – Bugsy; Oliver Stone – JFK; Ridley Scott – Thelma & Louise
**Best Actor in a Leading Role**: **Anthony Hopkins – The Silence of the Lambs as Dr. Hannibal Lecter**‡; Warren Beatty – Bugsy as Benjamin "Bugsy" Siegel; Robert De Niro – Cape Fear as Maximilian "Max" Cady; Nick Nolte – The Prince of Tides as Tom Wingo; Robin Williams – The Fisher King as Henry "Parry" Sagan	**Best Actress in a Leading Role**: **Jodie Foster – The Silence of the Lambs as Clarice Starling**‡; Geena Davis – Thelma & Louise as Thelma Dickinson; Laura Dern – Rambling Rose as Rose; Bette Midler – For the Boys as Dixie Leonard; Susan Sarandon – Thelma & Louise as Louise Sawyer
**Best Actor in a Supporting Role**: **Jack Palance – City Slickers as Curly Washburn**‡; Tommy Lee Jones – JFK as Clay Shaw/Clay Bertrand; Harvey Keitel – Bugsy as Mickey Cohen; Ben Kingsley – Bugsy as Meyer Lansky; Michael Lerner – Barton Fink as Jack Lipnick	**Best Actress in a Supporting Role**: **Mercedes Ruehl – The Fisher King as Anne Napolitano**‡; Diane Ladd – Rambling Rose as Mother; Juliette Lewis – Cape Fear as Danielle Bowden; Kate Nelligan – The Prince of Tides as Lila Wingo Newbury; Jessica Tandy – Fried Green Tomatoes as Virginia "Ninny" Threadgoode
**Best Writing (Screenplay Written Directly for the Screen)**: **Thelma & Louise – Callie Khouri**‡; Boyz n the Hood – John Singleton; Bugsy – James Toback; The Fisher King – Richard LaGravenese; Grand Canyon – Lawrence Kasdan and Meg Kasdan	**Best Writing (Screenplay Based on Material Previously Produced or Published)**: **The Silence of the Lambs – Ted Tally based on the novel by Thomas Harris**‡; Europa Europa – Agnieszka Holland based on the memoirs of Solomon Perel; Fried Green Tomatoes – Fannie Flagg and Carol Sobieski (posthumous nomination) based on the novel Fried Green Tomatoes at the Whistle Stop Cafe by Fannie Flagg; JFK – Oliver Stone and Zachary Sklar based on the books Crossfire: The Plot That Killed Kennedy by Jim Marrs and On the Trail of the Assassins by Jim Garrison; The Prince of Tides – Pat Conroy and Becky Johnston based on the novel by Pat Conroy
**Best Foreign Language Film**: **Mediterraneo (Italy) in Italian – Gabriele Salvatores**‡; Children of Nature (Iceland) in Icelandic – Friðrik Þór Friðriksson; The Elementary School (Czechoslovakia) in Czech – Jan Svěrák; The Ox (Sweden) in Swedish – Sven Nykvist; Raise the Red Lantern (Hong Kong) in Mandarin – Zhang Yimou	**Best Documentary (Feature)**: **In the Shadow of the Stars – Allie Light and Irving Saraf, producers**‡; Death on the Job – Vince DiPersio and William Guttentag, producers; Doing Time: Life Inside the Big House – Alan Raymond and Susan Raymond, producers; The Restless Conscience: Resistance to Hitler Within Germany 1933–1945 – Hava Kohav Beller, producer; Wild by Law – Lawrence Hott and Diane Garey, producers
**Best Documentary (Short Subject)**: **Deadly Deception: General Electric, Nuclear Weapons and Our Environment – Debra Chasnoff, producer**‡; Birdnesters of Thailand aka Shadowhunters – Éric Valli and Alain Majani, producers; A Little Vicious – Immy Humes, producer; The Mark of the Maker – David McGowan, producer; Memorial: Letters from American Soldiers – Bill Couturié and Bernard Edelman, producers	**Best Short Film (Live Action)**: **Session Man – Seth Winston and Rob Fried**‡; Birch Street Gym – Stephen Kessler and Thomas R. Conroy; Last Breeze of Summer – David M. Massey
**Best Short Film (Animated)**: **Manipulation – Daniel Greaves**‡; Blackfly – Christopher Hinton; Strings – Wendy Tilby	**Best Music (Original Score)**: **Beauty and the Beast – Alan Menken**‡; Bugsy – Ennio Morricone; The Fisher King – George Fenton; JFK – John Williams; The Prince of Tides – James Newton Howard
**Best Music (Original Song)**: **"Beauty and the Beast" from Beauty and the Beast – Music by Alan Menken; Lyrics by Howard Ashman (posthumous award)**‡; "Be Our Guest" from Beauty and the Beast – Music by Alan Menken; Lyrics by Howard Ashman (posthumous nomination); "Belle" from Beauty and the Beast – Music by Alan Menken; Lyrics by Howard Ashman (posthumous nomination); "(Everything I Do) I Do It for You" from Robin Hood: Prince of Thieves – Music by Michael Kamen; Lyrics by Bryan Adams and Robert John "Mutt" Lange; "When You're Alone" from Hook – Music by John Williams; Lyrics by Leslie Bricusse	**Best Sound**: **Terminator 2: Judgment Day – Gary Rydstrom, Tom Johnson, Gary Summers and Lee Orloff**‡; Backdraft – Gary Rydstrom, Randy Thom, Gary Summers and Glenn Williams; Beauty and the Beast – Terry Porter, Mel Metcalfe, David J. Hudson and Doc Kane; JFK – Michael Minkler, Gregg Landaker and Tod A. Maitland; The Silence of the Lambs – Tom Fleischman and Christopher Newman
**Best Sound Effects Editing**: **Terminator 2: Judgment Day – Gary Rydstrom and Gloria S. Borders**‡; Backdraft – Gary Rydstrom and Richard Hymns; Star Trek VI: The Undiscovered Country – George Watters II and F. Hudson Miller	**Best Art Direction**: **Bugsy – Art Direction: Dennis Gassner; Set Decoration: Nancy Haigh**‡; Barton Fink – Art Direction: Dennis Gassner; Set Decoration: Nancy Haigh; The Fisher King – Art Direction: Mel Bourne; Set Decoration: Cindy Carr; Hook – Art Direction: Norman Garwood; Set Decoration: Garrett Lewis; The Prince of Tides – Art Direction: Paul Sylbert; Set Decoration: Caryl Heller
**Best Cinematography**: **JFK – Robert Richardson**‡; Bugsy – Allen Daviau; The Prince of Tides – Stephen Goldblatt; Terminator 2: Judgment Day – Adam Greenberg; Thelma & Louise – Adrian Biddle	**Best Makeup**: **Terminator 2: Judgment Day – Stan Winston and Jeff Dawn**‡; Hook – Christina Smith, Monty Westmore and Greg Cannom; Star Trek VI: The Undiscovered Country – Michael Mills, Edward French and Richard Snell
**Best Costume Design**: **Bugsy – Albert Wolsky**‡; The Addams Family – Ruth Myers; Barton Fink – Richard Hornung; Hook – Anthony Powell; Madame Bovary – Corinne Jorry	**Best Film Editing**: **JFK – Pietro Scalia and Joe Hutshing**‡; The Commitments – Gerry Hambling; The Silence of the Lambs – Craig McKay; Terminator 2: Judgment Day – Conrad Buff, Mark Goldblatt and Richard A. Harris; Thelma & Louise – Thom Noble
**Best Visual Effects**: **Terminator 2: Judgment Day – Dennis Muren, Stan Winston, Gene Warren Jr. and Robert Skotak**‡; Backdraft – Mikael Salomon, Allen Hall, Clay Pinney and Scott Farrar; Hook – Eric Brevig, Harley Jessup, Mark Sullivan and Michael Lantieri

=== Honorary Award ===
- To Satyajit Ray, in recognition of his rare mastery of the art of motion pictures, and of his profound humanitarian outlook, which has had an indelible influence on filmmakers and audiences throughout the world.

=== Irving G. Thalberg Memorial Award ===
- George Lucas

=== Films with multiple nominations and awards ===
The following 16 films had multiple nominations:

Nominations	Film
10	Bugsy
8	JFK
7	The Prince of Tides
7	The Silence of the Lambs
6	Beauty and the Beast
6	Terminator 2: Judgment Day
6	Thelma & Louise
5	The Fisher King
5	Hook
3	Backdraft
3	Barton Fink
2	Boyz n the Hood
2	Cape Fear
2	Fried Green Tomatoes
2	Rambling Rose
2	Star Trek VI: The Undiscovered Country

The following five films received multiple awards:

Awards	Film
5	The Silence of the Lambs
4	Terminator 2: Judgment Day
2	Beauty and the Beast
2	Bugsy
2	JFK

== Presenters and performers ==
The following individuals presented awards or performed musical numbers:

=== Presenters (in order of appearance) ===
Name(s)	Role
Les Marshak	Announcer for the 64th annual Academy Awards
Karl Malden (AMPAS President)	Giver of opening remarks welcoming guests to the awards ceremony
Whoopi Goldberg	Presenter of the award for Best Supporting Actor
Kathleen Turner	Presenter of the film Bugsy on the Best Picture segment
Rebecca De Mornay; Christopher Lloyd	Presenters of the award for Best Makeup
Angela Lansbury	Introducer of the performances of the Best Original Song nominees "Belle" and "Be Our Guest"
Joe Pesci	Presenter of the award for Best Supporting Actress
Annette Bening	Presenter of the award for Best Art Direction
Steven Spielberg	Presenter of the Irving G. Thalberg Memorial Award to George Lucas
Nicole Kidman	Introducer of the performance of Best Original Song nominee "Everything I Do (I Do It For You)"
Antonio Banderas; Sharon Stone	Presenters of the award for Best Sound Effects Editing
Denzel Washington	Presenter of the film JFK on the Best Picture segment
Geena Davis; Susan Sarandon	Presenters of the award for Best Film Editing
Dana Carvey; Mike Myers	Presenters of the award for Best Live Action Short Film and introduced Belle and Beast
Belle (Paige O'Hara); Beast (Robby Benson); Chip (Bradley Pearce)	Presentations of the award for Best Animated Short Film
Demi Moore	Presenter of the award for Best Costume Design
Sylvester Stallone	Presenter of the award for Best Foreign Language Film
Daryl Hannah; Edward James Olmos	Presenters of the award for Best Sound
John Candy	Introducer of the performance of Best Original Song nominee "When You're Alone"
Tom Hanks	Presenter of the segment of the Academy Awards for Technical Achievement and the Gordon E. Sawyer Award
Spike Lee; John Singleton	Presenters of the awards for Best Documentary Short Subject and Best Documentary Feature
Sally Field	Presenter of the film Beauty and the Beast on the Best Picture segment
Richard Gere	Presenter of the award for Best Cinematography
Laura Dern; Diane Ladd	Presenters of the award for Best Visual Effects
Patrick Swayze	Introducer of the special dance number to the tune of the Best Original Score nominees and presenter of the award for Best Original Score
Jack Valenti	Introducer of presenter, Audrey Hepburn
Audrey Hepburn	Presenter of the Honorary Academy Award to Satyajit Ray
John Lithgow	Presenter of the film The Silence of the Lambs on the Best Picture segment
Robert Duvall; Anjelica Huston	Presenters of the awards for Best Screenplay Written Directly for the Screen and Best Screenplay Based on Material Previously Produced or Published
Kathy Bates	Presenter of the award for Best Actor
Shirley MacLaine; Liza Minnelli	Presenters of the award for Best Original Song
Michael Douglas	Presenter of the award for Best Actress
Jessica Tandy	Presenter of the film The Prince of Tides on the Best Picture segment
Kevin Costner	Presenter of the award for Best Director
Paul Newman; Elizabeth Taylor	Presenters of the award for Best Picture

=== Performers (in order of appearance) ===
Name(s)	Role	Performed
Bill Conti	Musical arranger	Orchestral
Billy Crystal	Performer	Opening number: Beauty and the Beast (to the tune of the theme song from The Patty Duke Show), The Silence of the Lambs (to the tune of "The Shadow of Your Smile" from The Sandpiper), Bugsy (to the tune of "Toot Toot Tootsie Goo' Bye" from The Jazz Singer), JFK (to the tune of "Three Coins in the Fountain" from Three Coins in the Fountain), and The Prince of Tides (to the tune of "Don't Rain on My Parade" from Funny Girl)
Paige O'Hara; Richard White	Performers	"Belle" from Beauty and the Beast
Jerry Orbach	Performer	"Be Our Guest" from Beauty and the Beast
Bryan Adams	Performer	"(Everything I Do) I Do It for You" from Robin Hood: Prince of Thieves
Amber Scott	Performer	"When You're Alone" from Hook
Peabo Bryson; Celine Dion; Angela Lansbury	Performers	"Beauty and the Beast" from Beauty and the Beast

== Ceremony information ==
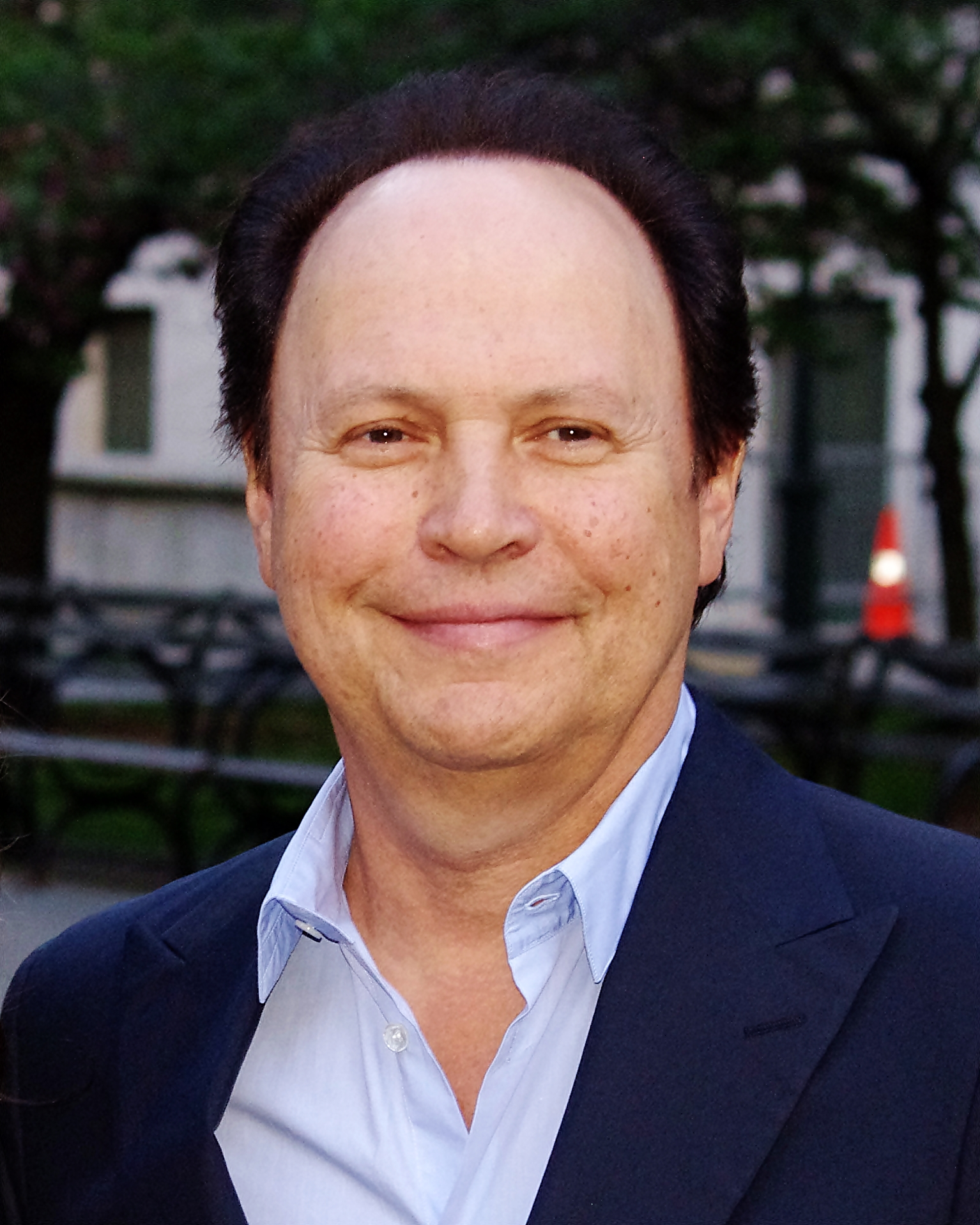
Billy Crystal hosted the 64th Academy Awards.

Riding on the success of the previous year's ceremony which won several Emmys, AMPAS rehired Gil Cates for the third consecutive year. He christened the 1992 ceremony with the theme "Pure Joy of the Movies," explaining that "Motion pictures provide us with laughter, romance, adventure and a deeper understanding of ourselves. With all the extraordinary events that are taking place today, it's wonderful that we can still get away to see a film."

A month before the festivities, Cates recruited actor and comedian Billy Crystal to host the ceremony for the third straight year. Shortly before the ceremony, Crystal got the flu, so Cates asked Tom Hanks for a possible replacement. Hanks agreed, but ultimately Crystal informed the producers that he would be able to host. According to Variety columnist Army Archerd, Crystal planned to perform a bungee jump stunt as part of his entrance at the beginning of the ceremony. However, the act was scrapped due to high insurance costs for the AMPAS and Crystal coming down with the flu. Instead, Crystal, who was wearing Hannibal Lecter's mask from The Silence of the Lambs, was hauled onto the stage by two men.

Several other people were involved in the production of the ceremony. Choreographer Debbie Allen supervised the Best Song nominee performances and the Best Original Score dance number. Film composer and musician Bill Conti served as musical director of the ceremony. In tandem with the theme of the ceremony, Chuck Workman produced a montage highlighting famous comedy movie scenes from past and present.

=== Box office performance of nominees ===
At the time of the nominations announcement on February 19, the combined gross of the five Best Picture nominees at the US box office was $393 million with an average of $78.7 million per film. The Silence of the Lambs was the highest earner among the Best Picture nominees, with $130.7 million in domestic box office receipts. The film was followed by Beauty and the Beast ($106.6 million), The Prince of Tides ($59.3 million), JFK ($58.1 million), and finally Bugsy ($38.9 million).

Of the 50 top-grossing movies of the year, 72 nominations went to 15 of them. Only Silence of the Lambs (3rd), Beauty and the Beast (6th), Cape Fear (10th), The Prince of Tides (18th), JFK (21st), Boyz n the Hood (22nd), Thelma and Louise (27th), The Fisher King (30th), and Bugsy (32nd) were nominated for Best Picture, directing, acting, or screenwriting. The other top 50 box office hits that earned nominations were Terminator 2: Judgment Day (1st), Robin Hood: Prince of Thieves (2nd), Hook (5th), The Addams Family (7th), Backdraft (12th), and Star Trek VI: the Undiscovery Country (13th).

=== LGBT in film protest ===
Several days before the ceremony, LGBT activist groups such as Queer Nation and Out in Film announced plans to stage a protest outside the Dorothy Chandler Pavilion. The organizations were voicing their complaints regarding derogatory and unflattering portrayals of homosexuals in film such as The Silence of the Lambs, JFK, and the upcoming film Basic Instinct. Queer Nation spokesman Rick Wilson said that the demonstrators "would stop cars from getting to the Oscars. It'll be a stall-in". Wilson also announced plans to disrupt the proceedings inside the theater. In response, producer Gil Cates stated, "Anyone can protest about anything they want outside the show." But he said that the standard, "generic response" to something happening during the ceremony on camera, "would be to cut to a commercial." Moreover, Academy spokesman Bob Werden reiterated that while security plans would not be as stringent as the previous year, firemen and police officers would be on hand in case of fallout from the protests.

On the day of the telecast, several protesters carried various signs that contained statements such as "Stop Hollywood's Homophobia" and "Hollywood Stop Censoring Our True Queer Lives." One man who had purchased tickets to the ceremony yelled statistics regarding AIDS in protest as John Candy was introducing a Best Song performance. Without making any arrests or having his comments heard during the broadcast, security immediately escorted the protester out.

=== Critical reviews ===
The show received a positive reception from most media publications. The New York Times film critic Janet Maslin raved that the telecast was "uncharacteristically lively". She also praised host Crystal, saying that his opening monologue "set the evening's clever and iconoclastic tone." Columnist Scott Williams of the Associated Press wrote that "Crystal was charming from the moment he was wheeled onstage and strolled into the audience wearing the face mask of the demonic Hannibal 'The Cannibal' Lecter from The Silence of the Lambs, which was named best picture." Ray Richmond from the Orange County Register commented that Crystal "is such a magnificent Oscar host that the job should be his as long as he wants it."

=== Ratings and reception ===
The American telecast on ABC drew in an average of 44.44 million people over its length, which was a 5% increase from the previous year's ceremony. The show also drew higher Nielsen ratings compared to the previous ceremony, with 29.84% of households watching over a 50.26 share. In addition, it also drew a higher 18–49 demo rating with a 20.71 rating over a 39.51 share among viewers in that demographic.

In July 1992, the ceremony presentation received nine nominations at the 44th Primetime Emmys. The following month, the ceremony won three of those nominations for Outstanding Writing for a Variety Program (Hal Kanter, Buz Kohan, Billy Crystal, Marc Shaiman, David Steinberg, Robert Wuhl, Bruce Vilanch), Outstanding Music Direction (Bill Conti, Jack Eskew, Julie Giroux, Ashley Irwin, and Hummie Mann), and Outstanding Costume Design for a Variety or Music Program (Raymond Aghayan).

== See also ==
- 12th Golden Raspberry Awards
- 34th Grammy Awards
- 44th Primetime Emmy Awards
- 45th British Academy Film Awards
- 46th Tony Awards
- 49th Golden Globe Awards
- List of submissions to the 64th Academy Awards for Best Foreign Language Film
- 1991 in film

== Bibliography ==
- Levy, Emanuel (2003). All About Oscar: The History and Politics of the Academy Awards. New York, United States: Continuum International Publishing Group. ISBN 0-8264-1452-4.
- Wiley, Mason; Bona, Damien (1996). Inside Oscar: The Unofficial History of the Academy Awards (5 ed.). New York, United States: Ballantine Books. ISBN 0-345-40053-4. OCLC 779680732.
