= Fried green tomatoes (disambiguation) =

Fried green tomatoes may refer to:

- Fried green tomatoes, a culinary dish in the United States
- Fried Green Tomatoes at the Whistle Stop Cafe, the 1987 novel by Fannie Flagg
- Fried Green Tomatoes, the 1991 film adaptation of the Flagg novel

- Fried Green Tomatoes (score), the original film score by Thomas Newman

- Fried Green Tomatoes, the 2000 music album by country music artist Ricky Van Shelton
