= Daisy Fay and the Miracle Man =

Book by Fannie Flagg

- paperback cover
- Author: Fannie Flagg
- Language: English
- Genre: Historical novel
- Publisher: Warner Books
- Publication date: 1981
- Publication place: United States
- Media type: Print (Hardcover and Paperback)
- Pages: 320 pp
- ISBN: 0-446-39452-1
- OCLC: 25552110
- Dewey Decimal: 813/.54 20
- LC Class: PS3556.L26 C6 1992

Daisy Fay and the Miracle Man is a 1981 novel by author Fannie Flagg. It was originally published under the title Coming Attractions. The story is a series of diary entries that chronicle the main character's years growing up in Mississippi from 1952 to 1959.

== Plot ==
Daisy Fay and the Miracle Man is told in diary writings starting in 1952 when the protagonist, Daisy Fay Harper, is 11 years old. She lives with her mother and her father in Jackson, Mississippi. Daisy Fay received her name from a vase of flowers that her mother had in her hospital room. Her father involves her in many of his unsuccessful schemes to make money or build inventions. He alienates his family members but makes great friends when he drinks.

Her mother lives in a constant state of embarrassment, and tries to do what she can to make Daisy Fay into a lady, which consists of making her fetch endless cups of coffee in the cafeteria, and buying matching mother-daughter outfits.

Her mother, Daisy's Grandma Pettibone, believes she married beneath her. (Despite both sets of Grandparents not speaking to Daisy's father, they absolutely dote on Daisy) The diary reveals Daisy Fay has an expansive imagination and a detailed memory as a long list of endearing and strange characters are described and the story is told in humorous vignettes.

Soon after the beginning of the diary, Daisy Fay and her parents move to Shell Beach, Mississippi, after her father buys half a share of a malt shop on the beach with $500 her mother won at a Bingo game. Daisy's mother was dead set against moving from Jackson, but her father stated that since nobody in their respective families were speaking to him, they would have been unhappy staying in Jackson, hence the move.

Her father's plan is to become a taxidermist during the off season, and to use the malt shop's freezer to store the dead animals before stuffing them.

The biggest town near Shell Beach is Magnolia Springs, where the school, a movie theater and several other businesses are. Her parents' relationship becomes more tempestuous as her father drinks too much and hangs around a gentle crop duster named Jimmy Snow, and they manage to get into impossible situations.

When the fall starts, Daisy Fay starts the 6th grade and meets her classmates, which include the very snobby and spoiled Kay Bob Benson, who serves as a nemesis for Daisy Fay throughout the rest of the book. Daisy's best friend is Michael Romeo, a Catholic, and the only other child, aside from Daisy and Kay Bob, who lives in Shell Beach full-time.

She also makes friends with classmates, Patsy Ruth Coggins and Amy Jo Snipes, among others, and is good friends with an African-American mortician/bar owner named Peachy Wigham and her co-hort, an albino named Ula Sour. Peachy, the owner of the Elite Nightspot bar, had a secret on the white Sheriff's daughter, (she had had an abortion) which was why she wasn't ever arrested.

Also, she meets Mrs. Dudley Dot, a journalist (she writes the Dashes from Dot column for the local paper) and the leader of the Junior Debutantes, a pre-teen group which meets in the bait shop over the summer. Mrs. Dot is idolized by Daisy, and is eventually institutionalized after trying to kill her hateful husband.

The taxidermy doesn't seem to work out well, as the bobcat had a smile on its face and the flamingo's neck was crooked. Added to that is the fact that Daisy Fay's father didn't add bread to the hamburgers, and his drinking increased.

Daisy's parents relationship gets even more and more rancorous, with them fighting over money and various infidelities.

In fact, one argument was so bad that Mrs. Harper, armed with a gun, was intent on killing Mr. Harper dead. So angry was she at him that she kicks the screen door clean off the hinges and knocks him eight feet into the back yard. She then proceeded to chase him all over the beach, but she never catches him.

After the malt shop burns down in a suspicious fire (the insurance money wasn't enough anyway), Daisy Fay's mother, finally having had enough of Daisy Fay's father, leaves him to go live with her sister, Mignon, in Virginia.

With her mother gone, her father devises a three-day scheme with a scheming local preacher named Billy Bundy to use Daisy Fay as a "glory getter" to bring her back from the dead and bilk the faithful religious out of their donations. The plan falls apart of course, when Daisy is asked to heal a disabled girl named Betty Caldwell, the girl walked, and the crowd went berserk.

Her father and she had to escape quickly in Jimmy Snow's cropduster to Florida, and the diary takes a hiatus for four years.

Her mother finds out about what happened, and she is furious (allegedly Daisy's mother hears the news from Kay Bob Benson's equally snobby mother).

She pulls Daisy Fay from her father and puts her in a Catholic Boarding School in Bay St. Louis, Mississippi, on the Mississippi Gulf Coast.

When the diary resumes, the year is 1956, Daisy is 15, and she has returned to Shell Beach from living in the Catholic boarding school.

Her father still drinks - maybe even more - and her mother has died from cancer. Daisy Fay enters Magnolia Springs high school to find Kay Bob snobbier than ever, but now has a best friend, Pickle Watkins, to endure the trials of high school.

She meets Pickle after she comes to Daisy's aid by helping her beat up another local girl, Dixie Nash, who had insulted her because of her living in a Catholic school, while Daisy called Dixie, a Baptist baboon.

Along with Pickle, Daisy Fay meets her friend's siblings, older brother Lemuel and younger sister, Judy (aka Baby Sister), who also become her friends. Pickle is obsessed with being accepted by the popular seniors and gets them into situations where they must better themselves socially. Daisy Fay lives in various apartments, hotels, and porches with her father and Jimmy Snow.

Pickle gets raped by her father, a member of the White Citizens Council, and drops out of school after she finds out she is pregnant. When she learns about her pregnancy, her boyfriend, Mustard Smoot, marries her to give the baby a father. She eventually gives birth to a son, Lemuel, named after her brother, and they have another child.

Daisy Fay goes to Summer School in Jackson (she briefly stays with her grandmother) and later becomes involved in a community theater in Hattiesburg, Mississippi, where she and her father and Jimmy Snow had moved to.

She manages the spotlight, then becomes an actor in the various plays and musicals they put on.

Her closest friend at this point in her life, is a gay man named Mr. Cecil. Mr. Cecil, whose last name was never revealed, was a well known hat designer who happened to own a millinery shop in Hattiesburg.

Mr. Cecil also served as the costume designer for the theater and he is often seen with his ten male cohorts called the "Cecilettes".

Other friends at this point in her life included Professor Teasley, the head director of the theater; his wealthy and often eccentric mother Nanny Teasley; Tootie, Helen, and Dolores, three secretaries at the theater, J.R. Phillips, the theater's stage manager, who was supposedly also gay; Hubert Jamison, a fellow (and somewhat vain) actor; and a woman named Paris Knights, an artist who is a friend of Mr. Cecil's.

At this point, she is engaged and almost married, but was jilted by her fiancé, Ray Layne, when he returns to his former fiancée, named of Ann, and eventually marries her. She eventually graduates school, with the aid of Professor Teasley fixing it so she can graduate without having to deal with Algebra.

Seeing her only break to be a professional actress, Daisy Fay, with Mr. Cecil's help, enters the Miss Mississippi pageant in Tupelo, Mississippi, once more meeting up with her perennial antagonist, Kay Bob Benson, who is also a competitor.

However, she makes fast friends with four other girls, Darcy Lewis, Mary Cudsworth, Jo Ellen Feely and Penny Raymond (Darcy met Daisy Fay after overhearing her call Kay Bob a witch); and they help her contend with how the Pageant was rigged by the Pageant's head, a Mrs. Lulie Harde McClay, who had promised the title to a Margaret Poole, who was supposedly sweet and kind, but was very much a hypocrite.

Margaret drank, smoked, swore, had many, many boyfriends, and had a very bad reputation; but around Mrs. McClay, butter wouldn't melt in her mouth.

In fact, during one of her smoke breaks, while the pageant hopefuls were at the Tupelo Country Club, she tried to get Daisy Fay framed for smoking, and in trouble with Mrs. McClay.

Mrs. McClay, spitefully, left Daisy Fay out of the Country Club talent show, of course believing Margaret. Kay Bob couldn't resist gloating and laughed at Daisy in scorn.

However, Darcy and the others, who have waited three years to get even with Mrs. McClay and Margaret Poole for their deceit and want to avenge Daisy Fay's exclusion from the talent show, make up and sing an obscene song.

The extremely objectionable song stuns the well-heeled audience, and this stunt gets Darcy, Mary, Jo Ellen and Penny left backstage at the State Theater, during the final judging of the pageant.

After that song, however, Daisy was again set to perform at the theater, with Mrs. McClay thinking that what Darcy and her friends did by singing such an objectionable song was far worse than Daisy smoking a cigarette, which she was innocent of. So the plan succeeded.

The talent portion of the show at the theater degenerates into a comedy of errors, as every other contestant's talent entries, excepting Daisy Fay's and a few others, were sabotaged in one form or another by the stagehands union, of which her paternal grandfather was president of (the theater's microphones malfunctioning {it was during one of those "malfunctions" when Margaret Poole said an expletive word, which was heard by the audience}; the house organ gets unplugged; a dummy's mouth which was glued shut, Kay Bob Benson throwing her batons all over because her hands were covered with axle grease, etc.).

They carried on like troupers, but afterwards, the sabotaged contestants would either react in abject rage or out of fear. Either way, they whose talent had been sabotaged ended up making fools out of themselves.

It was shown that during the final vote, the judges get into a knock down drag out fight over the results.

Only the snobbish Mrs. McClay and her ally, Mrs. Peggy Buchanan, the head of the Mississippi Junior League, were on Margaret Poole's side, while the other judges were rooting for Daisy Fay. However Margaret Poole herself had not wanted the title because she was secretly married to an African-American and was pregnant. Whether this was truth, or just another scheme, wasn't revealed.

This angered Mrs. McClay all the more, and she screamed that she was being sabotaged. She thought of Daisy Fay as white trash, and wasn't refined enough or enough of a Southern lady to be Miss Mississippi. The other judges, though, had their good names and reputations in the community to consider, and they didn't want to run the risk of the news about Margaret Poole being true, hence how they voted.

In fact, one of the judges, Madame Rosa Alberghotti, a well-known opera singer, was dead set against awarding the title to Margaret because she had screamed an expletive into the microphone. Mrs. McClay yelled at her to shut up. She further states that Margaret hadn't screamed the word into the microphone, although her claims were easily disproven because the offending word was heard by the whole audience.

With a lot of help from a lot of people (some of it not quite legitimate), she unexpectedly wins the pageant, to Mrs. McClay's disgust and outrage (because of this, she quits running the Miss Mississippi pageant for good because she felt betrayed by her so-called "friends") and is off to Atlantic City.

It was revealed that Mr. Cecil and the Cecilettes were going to accompany her, although it was never revealed who in the Miss Mississippi organization, if anyone, did accompany her, since Mrs. McClay had stated that she would not accompany Daisy Fay to Atlantic City.

After she won, she also discovers, to her shock and joy, that her maternal grandfather, who everyone had thought had died, was in fact alive and well and working as a cab driver in Tupelo. In fact, it was he who had driven his granddaughter to the pageant events. He had kept in touch with her Daddy over the years, despite their not speaking.

Before she leaves for the Miss America pageant, however, she gets word that Jimmy Snow, who had been kind of a surrogate uncle to her, had been in a plane crash, and had died of a broken neck. She mourned him, as did her father, and her loyal friend, Mr. Cecil. Her father revealed to her that she was the only person that Jimmy really loved, which surprised Daisy. After that, she achieves her ends and gets out of Mississippi. At the book's end, she states that "I promise that I won't come back until I'm somebody. And I won't."

== Trivia ==
Daisy Fay's Aunt Bess is a minor character, but has a cafe Daisy Fay loves to visit. Her aunt plays tricks on everyone, such as putting mustard in a baby doll's diaper and driving Daisy Fay's mother to distraction with her lack of social propriety. This character is based on Fannie Flagg's real life Aunt Bess, who ran the Irondale Cafe in Irondale, Alabama. She is the basis for the character of Idgie in Fried Green Tomatoes at the Whistle Stop Cafe.

Attending the Santa Barbara Writer's Conference in 1978 to see her idol, Eudora Welty, Flagg won first prize in the writing contest for a short story told from the perspective of an 11-year-old girl, spelling mistakes and all—a literary device that she figured was ingenious because it disguised her own pitiful spelling, later determined to be an outgrowth of dyslexia. An editor at Harper & Row approached her about expanding the story into a full-length novel.

"I just burst into tears and said, 'I can't write a novel,'" she told The New York Times in 1994. "'I can't spell. I can't diagram a sentence.' He took my hand and said the most wonderful thing I've ever heard. He said, 'Oh, honey, what do you think editors are for?'"

The book stayed on The New York Times bestseller list for 10 weeks.
