= Manipulation (film) =

- Directed by: Daniel Greaves
- Written by: Daniel Greaves
- Produced by: Daniel Greaves
- Edited by: Rod Howick
- Production company: Tandem Films
- Release date: 1991
- Running time: 7 minutes
- Country: United Kingdom
- Language: English

Manipulation is a 1991 British animated short film written and directed by Daniel Greaves. The film won the Academy Award for Best Animated Short Film at the 64th Academy Awards.
