= Can't Wait to Get to Heaven =

2006 novel by Fannie Flagg

- Author: Fannie Flagg
- Language: English
- Genre: Fiction
- Publisher: Random House
- Publication place: United States
- Media type: Print
- Pages: 365

Can't Wait to Get to Heaven is a 2006 novel by Fannie Flagg. Based in the fictional town of Elmwood Springs, Missouri, it is a humorous look at Southern mores and small-town mentality in the context of death and the existence of an afterlife. Elner Shimfissle, the octogenarian protagonist, falls out of a tree while picking figs and is rushed to the hospital unconscious, where she is reported dead. The novel satirizes both the response of her neighbors down below—including the food they send for the funeral and the obituary written for a Southern newspaper—and the view from above, where Elner meets her dead sister, her hero Thomas Alva Edison, and God Himself: her former neighbor, Raymond, a modest, pipe-smoking divinity.

== Plot ==
Elner Shimfissle, an octogenarian who doesn't know her own age since her sister Ida buried the family Bible to conceal hers, is known and liked by a large circle of friends and admirers. One morning she is picking figs in her tree when she is stung by wasps, falls off the ladder, and loses consciousness. She is rushed to the hospital in Kansas City, where she apparently dies. Back home, Elner's acquaintances tidy her house, feed her cat, and start preparing for her funeral. Elner, meanwhile, wakes up in her pitch-black hospital room and calls for assistance. Not receiving any, she goes out to the hallway and enters an elevator, which takes her straight "up." Her sister Ida greets her at Heaven's gates and then she is ushered upstairs to meet God and ask any questions she likes. Besides sporting such fanciful things as polka-dotted squirrels and unusually colored landscapes, Heaven also looks like her hometown, Elmwood Springs, about 50 years in the past. Elner meets God—her former neighbor Raymond, a modest, pipe-smoking divinity—and they discuss how he and his wife Dorothy created mankind and the current state of the world. Then Raymond sends Elner back down to Elmwood Springs, where she wakes up in her hospital bed and sets in motion another round of shocked neighbors who are incredulous that she's really alive. Elner lives a few more years after that and finally dies peacefully in her sleep, as she'd always wanted to. The novel closes with a series of recipes for the various dishes that Elner's neighbors made to send to her funeral.

== Setting ==
Like Flagg's 2002 novel Standing in the Rainbow, the story is based in the fictional town of Elmwood Springs, Missouri. Elner has appeared as a minor character in other Flagg novels, including the 2016 novel The Whole Town's Talking.

== Critical reception ==
Reviewers praised the book for its spot-on depiction of Southern small-town life and mores, complete with sentimental, plain-speaking characters. "This is the sort of place where everyone looks out for everyone else and nobody minds their own business," writes The Guardian. The Bookreporter adds: "Flagg effortlessly transports you to a world of old – a place where your front porch was the place to go, where neighbors looked out for each other, and a cool glass of iced tea cured all the world's ills". Charlotte Hays, writing for The Washington Post, notes: "Southern readers also will be intimately acquainted with Elmwood Springs's characteristic form of grief therapy: carbs. Can't Wait to Get to Heaven – the title comes from a gospel song Elner has requested in advance – supplies recipes for several of those gooey comfort foods that neighbors bring practically before the body is cold. 'Nothing too spicy', Flagg writes. 'When you are upset, you need bland and simple cream-based food'". Hays further points out that the obituary written for the local newspaper reflects the Southern tendency "to flatter both the deceased and their survivors".
