= I Still Dream About You =

2010 novel by Fannie Flagg

- First edition
- Author: Fannie Flagg
- Language: English
- Publisher: Random House
- Publication date: November 2010
- Publication place: United States

I Still Dream About You is a 2010 comedy-mystery novel by American writer Fannie Flagg. Set in Birmingham, Alabama, the story centers on a former Miss Alabama who decides to end her life rather than continue living an unfulfilling existence, and her friendships with idiosyncratic colleagues in a local real estate agency. The novel takes a light tone in describing the main character's suicide attempts, and provides a vivid look at Birmingham's history, its role in the civil rights movement, and typical Southern mores.

== Synopsis ==
Margaret Anne "Maggie" Fortenberry has reached the age of 60 and feels she has nothing left to live for. A former Miss Alabama, Maggie never made anything of her life or married. She enjoys her work in a real estate agency and also her friendships with Hazel Whisenknott, a positive-thinking little person who founded the agency; her real estate partner Brenda Peoples, an overweight black woman who aspires to be the city's first black woman mayor; and Ethel Clipp, the 88-year-old purple-haired office manager who is disgruntled with the deterioration of modern society. The only thing Maggie thinks she will miss are spring and fall in her native city of Birmingham, and the view of the graceful historic home called Crestview perched atop Red Mountain. Maggie determines to kill herself in the most unobtrusive way possible so the news won't be splashed all over the headlines. But every time she sets off to do the deed she is interrupted, until she realizes that she really wants to continue living after all.

Subplots involve the rivalry between Red Mountain Realty and Babs "The Beast" Bingington, a non-native of Birmingham with a fake name and a fake Southern accent who will do anything, legal or not, to get a listing; and the mystery surrounding the last owner of Crestview, Edward Crocker, whose skeleton Maggie and Brenda find in a steamer trunk in the home's locked attic.

== Themes ==
Known as the "Magic City", Birmingham plays a prominent role in the novel. Flagg charts its history from the founding of the iron, steel, and mining industries in the late 1800s to the "bustling and alive" commercial center in the 1950s to the urban decay of the 1960s to the depressed housing market of the 2000s. Flagg also places Maggie in the center of the civil rights movement and the city's struggles over racial segregation.

== Development ==
Flagg said in an interview in Southern Living that she set the novel in Birmingham because "I was trying to write a Valentine to my hometown". Flagg's father and grandfather had worked as motion picture machine operators in numerous theaters, just as the fictional Maggie's parents ran a movie house. Flagg had also competed in Junior Miss Alabama pageants in order to win school scholarships.

== Critical reception ==
The Journal-Gazette states that the novel will more readily appeal to women than men, since women may have experienced some of the scenarios themselves while men "might have difficulty relating to them". These include Maggie's dissatisfaction with her life, though to the outside observer "she seems to have the perfect life: she lives in a luxury condo, she drives a lovely Mercedes, she has beautiful clothing, she has money to spend on what she might want to spend it on". BookPage writes: "Despite the dark opening, I Still Dream About You is a surprisingly light read, thanks to a cast of folksy, eccentric characters full of gumption and good judgment". The Washington Times agrees, adding that "there is a sly tongue-in-cheek quality to the plot and its cheerful tone". This review also commends the sentimental portrait Flagg paints of the city of Birmingham itself, saying, "For the reader, it is as much a pleasure to discover the charm of Miss Flagg's Birmingham as it is to be entertained by her witty plot machinations and her offbeat characters".
