= Session Man (film) =

1991 film

- Poster
- Directed by: Seth Winston
- Written by: Seth Winston
- Produced by: Robert N. Fried; June Rachel Guterman; Jana Sue Memel; Jonathan Sanger; Seth Winston
- Starring: James Remar
- Cinematography: Charlie Lieberman
- Edited by: Debra Bard
- Music by: Don Davis
- Production company: Chanticleer Films
- Release date: 1991
- Running time: 31 minutes
- Country: United States
- Language: English

Session Man is a 1991 American short drama film directed by Seth Winston and starring James Remar. In 1992, it won an Oscar at the 64th Academy Awards for Best Short Subject.

== Plot ==
An aging, but capable and talented session guitarist named McQueen (James Remar) is awakened by a late-night call from a nearby recording studio. He is needed to help smooth out some tracks that are being worked on by an established and popular hard rock band, the Raging Kings. The band’s own lead guitarist, Dean Storm (Jeff Kober) is resentful of McQueen’s involvement, and after an argument with the other members he decides to leave the group altogether. Impressed by McQueen’s skills, the band asks him on the spot to replace Storm and he graciously accepts, fulfilling his lifelong dream.

After a brief jam session, Storm suddenly returns to the studio and asks to speak privately with the original band. They soon return from the meeting, and one member comes to McQueen and reluctantly tells him that he is out. Stunned, McQueen manages to complete what he was called to do and returns home to his wife, who is still in bed. She asks how it went, to which McQueen replies “Ok, just another session.”

== Cast ==
- James Remar as McQueen
- Richard Aguilar as Parking Guard
- Erich Anderson as Peter Goffigon
- Teresa Crespo as Young woman
- Greg De Belles as Lee Fisher
- Michael Durrette as Leonard
- Bader Howar as Holly Mc Queen
- Robert Knepper as Torrey Cole
- Jeff Kober as Dean Storm
- Tito Larriva as Mouse
- Evan MacKenzie as Dabid Abrams
- Chris McCarty as Stuart
- Michael Harris as Chris Manning
- Henry G. Sanders as Louie
- Chad Smith as Spider Moore
- Lee Tergesen as Neal
- Elena Wohl as Darcy Vance (as Elena Stiteler)
- Carol Stoddard as Photographer (uncredited)
