= Fannie Flagg =

American actress, comedian and author

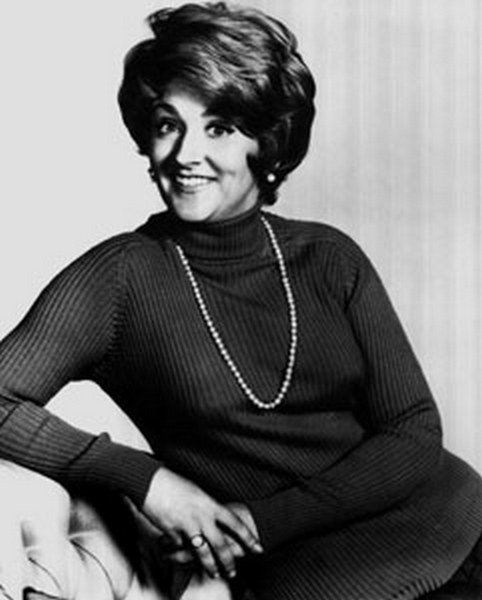
- Flagg in 1972
- Born: Patricia Neal; September 21, 1944 (age 81); Birmingham, Alabama, U.S.
- Occupations: Actress; comedian; author
- Years active: 1966–present
- Known for: Match Game; Fried Green Tomatoes at the Whistle Stop Cafe (book); Fried Green Tomatoes (film)

Fannie Flagg (born Patricia Neal; September 21, 1944) is an American actress, comedian, and author. She is most notable as a frequent panelist on the 1973–1982 versions of the game show Match Game and for her 1987 novel Fried Green Tomatoes at the Whistle Stop Cafe, which she adapted into the script for the 1991 motion picture Fried Green Tomatoes. She was nominated for an Academy Award for the screenplay adaptation. Flagg lives in California and Alabama.

== Early life ==
Born Patricia Neal in Birmingham, Alabama, Flagg is the only child of William Hurbert Neal Jr. and Marion Leona (née LeGore).

Aside from a brief period on the Gulf Coast near the town of Point Clear, Flagg spent her childhood in the Birmingham area.

Encouraged by her father, Flagg became interested in writing and performing at an early age, writing her first play when she was 10. As a teen, she entered the Miss Alabama pageant, where she won a scholarship to a local acting school for one year. She began co-hosting a locally produced "Morning Show" on WBRC-TV in Birmingham, but when she was denied a raise, she quit her job and decided to move to New York City.

As her acting career began, Flagg could not use her birth name professionally, as there was already an actress named Patricia Neal registered with Actors' Equity. Having only an hour to choose a stage name, she selected the first name "Fannie" at the suggestion of her grandfather, who recalled it being used by many comediennes in the vaudeville circuit, and "Flagg" at the suggestion of a friend.

== Career ==
=== Writing ===
During the 1960s, Flagg began writing skits for the New York nightclub Upstairs at the Downstairs. When one of the performers got sick, Flagg went on in her place and caught the attention of Candid Camera creator Allen Funt, who happened to be in the audience that night. Soon after, Flagg was invited to be a staff writer on his show and later became a performer as well.

In 1978, Flagg won first place in fiction for a short story that she had written at the Santa Barbara Writer's Conference. The work became the basis for the novel Coming Attractions which was published in 1981 following the deaths of her father and mother. The book was reissued in 1992 under the title Flagg originally wanted to use, Daisy Fay and the Miracle Man. The autobiographical coming-of-age novel is written as a diary that starts in 1952 with an 11-year-old protagonist, Daisy Fay Harper. Daisy uses diary entries to tell the story of her alcoholic father's get-rich-quick schemes and her well-mannered mother. The book stayed on The New York Times bestseller list for 10 weeks.

Fried Green Tomatoes at the Whistle Stop Cafe was published in 1987 and remained on The New York Times bestseller list for 36 weeks. It was praised by both Harper Lee and Eudora Welty. The novel is set in both the past and the present. The story focuses on Ninny Threadgoode, who recalls her past in the town of Whistle Stop, Alabama, in the 1920s and 1930s, but also shows the struggles of Evelyn Couch in present-day Birmingham. It is about the unlikely bonds forged between women who seemingly have nothing in common except restlessness. Flagg subsequently co-wrote the screenplay based on that book, which became the 1991 film Fried Green Tomatoes. The movie garnered her a nomination for an Academy Award. Fried Green Tomatoes starred Jessica Tandy, Kathy Bates, Mary Stuart Masterson, Mary-Louise Parker and Cicely Tyson.

She has also written Fannie Flagg's Original Whistle-Stop Café Cookbook (1993), Welcome to the World, Baby Girl! (1998), Standing in the Rainbow (2002), A Redbird Christmas (2004), Can't Wait to Get to Heaven (2006), I Still Dream About You (2010), The All-Girl Filling Station's Last Reunion (2013) and The Whole Town's Talking (2016). Her latest book, The Wonder Boy of Whistle Stop, was published in October 2020, and includes characters from Fried Green Tomatoes at the Whistle Stop Cafe.

=== Acting ===
During the 1970s, Flagg often appeared on game show panels, most notably Match Game (normally occupying the lower right-hand seat next to regular panelist Richard Dawson). In 1975, Flagg appeared on the game show Tattletales with Dick Sargent. Her stage acting credits include the short-lived 1978 Broadway play Patio/Porch and the original 1978 Broadway production of The Best Little Whorehouse in Texas (succeeding Carlin Glynn). She appeared in the films Five Easy Pieces (1970), Some of My Best Friends Are... (1971), Stay Hungry (1976), Grease (1978), and Crazy in Alabama (1999).

As well as minor roles in various television shows, she appeared as the Amazon Doctor in the 1975 pilot The New Original Wonder Woman with Lynda Carter. She is also known for being a regular on The New Dick Van Dyke Show, where for two seasons she played Mike Preston, sister to Van Dyke's character Dick Preston, and for her role as Cassie Bowman in all 30 episodes of the 1980-81 sitcom version of Harper Valley PTA starring Barbara Eden. She also appeared several times as a victim of alien abduction on the talk show parody Fernwood 2 Night in 1977. During the 1960s and 1970s, Flagg recorded two comedy albums with various skits that included many parodies of Lady Bird Johnson and Martha Mitchell.

=== Other TV appearances ===
In addition to her many game show appearances, Flagg has been a guest on several talk shows over the years, including The Joey Bishop Show, The Dick Cavett Show, The Merv Griffin Show, The Johnny Cash Show, Dinah!, and The Rosie O'Donnell Show. Flagg also appeared on Good Morning America to share some recipes from her book A Redbird Christmas.

== Personal life ==
Flagg has spoken publicly about being dyslexic. She has expressed the great challenge of being a writer, saying, "I was, am, severely dyslexic and couldn't spell, still can't spell. So I was discouraged from writing and embarrassed." Even though it was clear that she had an affinity for crafting stories, her dyslexia stalled any possible writing career through most of the 1970s.

It was not until a teacher spotted a pattern in Flagg's misspelled written answers on Match Game and sent her a note that she understood she had a learning disability; Flagg later stated she had not heard of the condition prior to this note. Eventually, Flagg was able to overcome her fear associated with the disorder and has since completed several novels.

In the mid-1970s, Flagg was in a relationship with American writer Rita Mae Brown, with whom she shared a house in Charlottesville, Virginia. The couple met at a party in the Hollywood Hills hosted by Marlo Thomas. According to Brown, Flagg dated and lived with former The Bold and the Beautiful actress Susan Flannery for eight years.

== Filmography ==
=== Film ===
Year	Title	Role	Notes
1970	Five Easy Pieces	Stoney	
1971	Some of My Best Friends Are...	Helen	
1976	Stay Hungry	Amy	Adaptation of the novel of the same name.
1978	Rabbit Test	The President's Wife	Directed by Joan Rivers.
1978	Grease	Nurse Wilkins	
1987	My Best Friend Is a Vampire	Mrs. Capello	Also known as I Was a Teenage Vampire.
1991	Fried Green Tomatoes	Teacher (uncredited); also Screenwriter	Academy Award screenplay nomination.
1998	Fried Green Tomatoes: The Moments of Discovery		Documentary
1999	Crazy in Alabama	Sally	

=== Television ===
Year	Title	Role	Notes
1967–1982	Match Game	Herself	Semi-Regular Panelist: 1967–1968; 1973–1982
1972	Love, American Style	Sally	Episode: "Love and the Bachelor Party" (S3: Ep 78)
1971–1973	The New Dick Van Dyke Show	Michelle "Mike" Preston	Main cast
1973–1974	$10,000 Pyramid	Herself	Fannie Flagg & Bill Cullen guest star (S1: Ep 22); Fannie Flagg & Wayne Rogers guest star (S2: Ep 47)
1974	Hollywood Squares	Herself	Recurring panelist
1975	Tattletales	Herself	(S2: Ep22) with Dick Sargent
1975	Wonder Woman	Amazon Doctor	Episode: "The New Original Wonder Woman" (Pilot)
1975	Home Cookin	Adelle	TV movie
1975	Match Game PM	Herself	Semi-Regular Panelist
1976	Word Grabbers	Herself	TV Movie; 2nd pilot
1977	Sex and the Married Woman	Virginia Ladysmith	TV movie
1977	Fernwood 2 Night	Sylvia Miller	Recurring
1979	The Love Boat	Alicia Finch	Episode: "The Decision/Poor Little Rich Girl/Love Me, Love My Dog" (S2: Ep 22)
1980	Battlestars	Herself	Guest star
1980	To Tell the Truth	Herself	Panelist
1981–1982	Harper Valley PTA	Cassie Bowman	Main Cast
1983	The Love Boat	Liz Merritt	Episode: "The Zinging Valentine/The Very Temporary Secretary/Final Score" (S6: Ep 20)
1986	The Love Boat	Laurie Ryan	Episode: "Father of the Bride/The Best Man/Members of the Wedding" (S9: Ep 10)
1987	Dolly	Screenwriter (S1: Episodes 1–5,8,10)	Variety show

== Published works ==
Year	Title	Notes
1981	Daisy Fay and the Miracle Man	Originally titled Coming Attractions, the title was changed when the book was reissued in 1992
1987	Fried Green Tomatoes at the Whistle Stop Cafe	Also wrote the screenplay for the film Fried Green Tomatoes
1993	Fannie Flagg's Original Whistle Stop Cafe Cookbook	
1998	Welcome to the World, Baby Girl!	First book in Elmwood Springs series
2002	Standing in the Rainbow	Second book in Elmwood Springs series
2004	A Redbird Christmas	
2006	Can't Wait to Get to Heaven	Third book in Elmwood Springs series
2010	I Still Dream About You	
2013	The All-Girl Filling Station's Last Reunion	Homage to the American WASPs during World War II
2016	The Whole Town's Talking	Fourth book in Elmwood Springs series
2020	The Wonder Boy of Whistle Stop	Sequel to Fried Green Tomatoes at the Whistle Stop Cafe
2025	Something to Look Forward To	

== Accolades ==
=== Awards and nominations ===
Year	Award	Category	Nominee	Result	Ref
1992	Academy Award	Best Adapted Screenplay	Fried Green Tomatoes	Nominated	
1992	Writers Guild of America Award	Best Adapted Screenplay	Fried Green Tomatoes	Nominated	
2012	Harper Lee Award	Alabama's Distinguished Writer of the Year			
