= Fried green tomatoes =

American dish

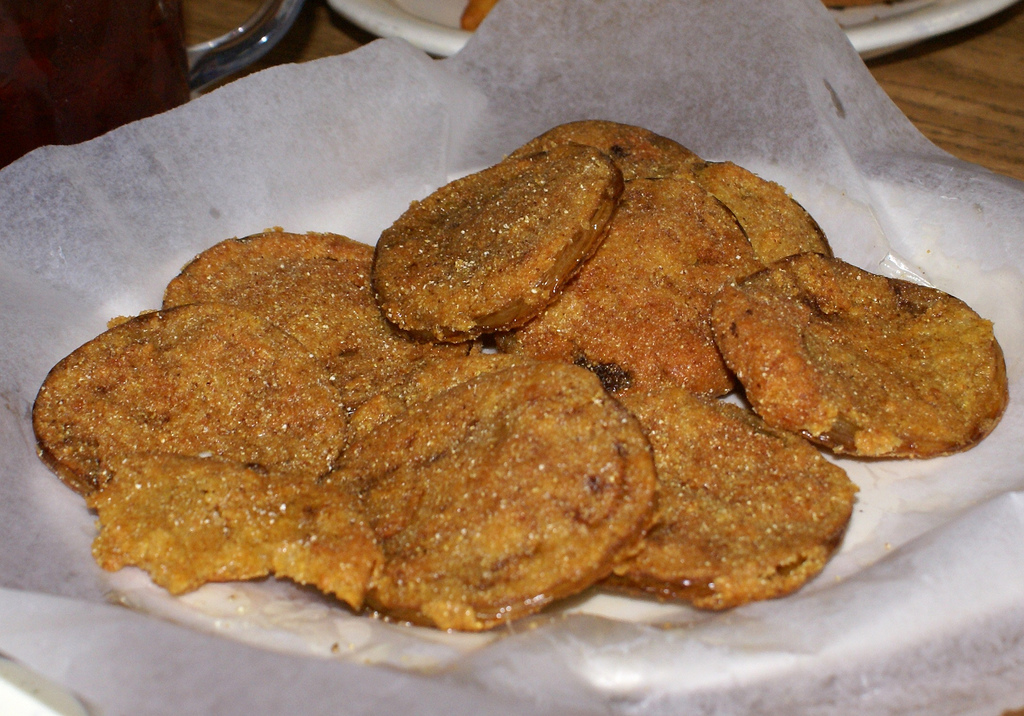
Fried green tomatoes

Fried green tomatoes is a culinary dish usually found in the United States, made from unripe (green) tomatoes coated with cornmeal and fried.

Recipes in the early 20th century were mainly published in the Northeastern United States and Midwestern United States. They became known as a food of the Southern United States after they were featured in the film Fried Green Tomatoes.

== Traditional preparation ==
Traditional preparation of fried green tomatoes begins by cutting the tomatoes into approximately 1/2 inch (1.3 cm), 1/4 in (~0.6 cm) or even 1/8 in (0.3 cm) slices. They are then seasoned with salt and pepper, coated with breadcrumbs, flour or cornmeal and fried in butter or lard until both sides are golden brown.

Some recipes include adding cayenne pepper or sugar, or serving with gravy. Alternative methods of preparation include using vegetable oil for frying, soaking the slices in salt water or dipping them in egg wash before coating, or directly putting the freshly cut slices into the frying pan.

== Distribution of the dish and popularity from the film ==
Historian Robert F. Moss found that from 1900–1911, there were 11 recipes for the dish published in U.S. newspapers. The articles were from the Northeastern United States and Midwestern United States. Moss believes that the dish originated from those areas, "perhaps with a link to Jewish immigrants".

According to Moss, instructors in cooking in home economics courses adopted the dish. The sole instance of the recipe in the 1920s in the southern United States' newspapers came from an article that was in syndication across the United States, instead of being specifically from the South. From the 1930s to the 1960s, there was one instance of the recipe in Southern American newspapers. After the film Fried Green Tomatoes was released, Americans associated the dish with the South despite the lack of evidence that the dish was previously widely prepared in the U.S. South.

As of 2017, within West Virginia, the dish is more often found in the southern portion of the state.

== Pennsylvania Dutch version ==
While fried green tomatoes are usually considered a southern dish, they are also part of Pennsylvania Dutch cuisine as well. The northern version is more likely to be made with white flour rather than corn meal. Also, green tomatoes tend to be prepared at the end of the season in the north when the remaining fruit is harvested before the first frosts, whereas green tomatoes are picked throughout the season in the south.

== Other preparations ==
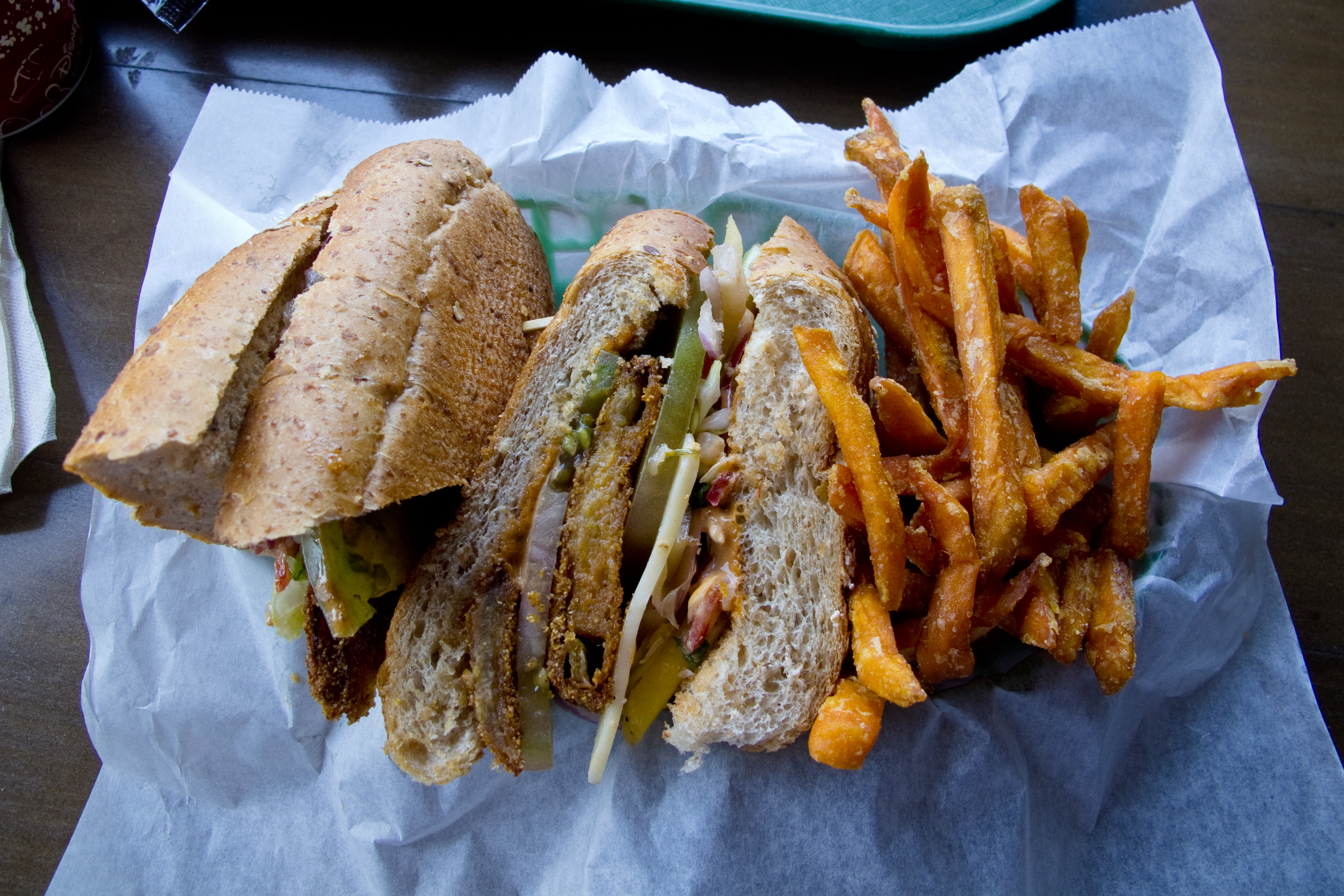
Fried green tomato sandwich at the Hungry Bear Restaurant, Disneyland Resort, California

Fried green tomatoes with shrimp remoulade is a southern and Creole combination served at many restaurants in New Orleans, Louisiana.

== See also ==
- Cuisine of the Southern United States
- List of tomato dishes
