= Glenn Williams (sound engineer) =

American sound engineer

- Occupation: Sound engineer
- Years active: 1980-1996

Glenn Williams is an American sound engineer. He was nominated for an Academy Award in the category Best Sound for the film Backdraft.

== Selected filmography ==
- Backdraft (1991)
