= The Mark of the Maker =

1991 film

- Produced by: David McGowan
- Production companies: McGowan Film and Video
- Distributed by: Direct Cinema
- Release date: 1991
- Country: United States
- Language: English

The Mark of the Maker is a 1991 American short documentary film about manual papermaking, produced by David McGowan. It was nominated for an Academy Award for Best Documentary Short.
