= Seth Winston =

American screenwriter

Seth Lance Winston (August 15, 1950 – June 5, 2015) was an American filmmaker best known for his short film Session Man.

Born in Philadelphia and raised in Los Angeles, Winston received a Bachelor of Arts in cinema production from the USC School of Cinematic Arts. He was selected by the Academy of Motion Picture Arts and Sciences for their director's internship program, where he worked on Steven Spielberg's Close Encounters of the Third Kind. He went on to write for television and film, including She's Out of Control, starring Tony Danza.

Winston won the Academy Award for Best Live Action Short along with Rob Fried in 1991 for Session Man. He taught at the USC School of Cinematic Arts, UC Santa Barbara and Columbia College Hollywood.

Winston died at his home in Woodland Hills from an apparent heart attack on June 5, 2015, aged 64. Director and writer Kim Nguyen dedicated his movie Two Lovers and a Bear (2016) in memory of Winston.
