= David Massey (director) =

American film director

David Maurice Massey (born 1957) is an American filmmaker. In 1992, he was nominated for an Academy Award for Best Live Action Short Film as a producer for the film Last Breeze of Summer. He is one of two African Americans to be nominated for a short film of any kind and the film won a Crystal Heart Award.

Massey has a BA in Communications & Education from Ohio Dominican University and an MFA in advanced film & television studies from the American Film Institute. He has received recognition by The National Education Association for the “Advancement of Learning through Broadcasting,” and is an inductee at The Black Filmmakers Hall of Fame. His From 1996 to 2000, Massey taught photojournalism, film, and video for the Los Angeles Unified School District. David Massey directed a short film about the Vietnam War.
