= Fried Green Tomatoes (score) =

Film score by Thomas Newman
- Released: June 9, 1992
- Genre: Soundtrack, Instrumental
- Length: 34:16
- Label: MCA

Thomas Newman chronology
| The Player | Fried Green Tomatoes | Scent of a Woman |

Fried Green Tomatoes: Original Motion Picture Score is the film score to the 1991 film Fried Green Tomatoes, composed by Thomas Newman. It was released on June 9, 1992, by MCA Records.

Professional ratings
Review scores
| Source | Rating |
|---|---|
| Allmusic | link |
| SoundtrackNet | 4.5/5 stars |

== Track listing ==
1. "Ghost Train", performed by Marion Williams (3:12)
2. "Whistle Stop, Ala." (1:16)
3. "A Charge To Keep I Have", performed by Marion Williams (2:34)
4. "Xmas in Hooverville" (1:51)
5. "The Tree House" (1:08)
6. "Night Baseball", performed by Marion Williams (0:57)
7. "Whither Thou Goest I Will Go" (1:51)
8. "Buddy Threadgoode" (1:18)
9. "Didn't It Rain", performed by Marion Williams (2:51)
10. "The Bee Charmer" (1:59)
11. "Wallpaper" (1:31)
12. "The Smell of Coffee" (1:10)
13. "Visiting Ruth" (1:43)
14. "Miss Otis Died" (1:27)
15. "The Town Follies", performed by Ralph Grierson (0:44)
16. "Klansmen" (2:04)
17. "Smokey Lonesome" (1:23)
18. "Big George", performed by Marion Williams
19. "Night Baseball" [Mandolin Reprise] (1:02)
20. "The Whistle Stop Cafe" (2:25)
