= Fried Green Tomatoes =

1991 film by Jon Avnet

- Theatrical release poster
- Directed by: Jon Avnet
- Screenplay by: Fannie Flagg; Carol Sobieski
- Based on: Fried Green Tomatoes at the Whistle Stop Cafe by Fannie Flagg
- Produced by: Jon Avnet; Jordan Kerner
- Starring: Kathy Bates; Jessica Tandy; Mary Stuart Masterson; Mary-Louise Parker; Cicely Tyson
- Cinematography: Geoffrey Simpson
- Edited by: Debra Neil-Fisher
- Music by: Thomas Newman
- Production companies: Avnet/Kerner Productions; Electric Shadow Productions; Act III Communications
- Distributed by: Universal Pictures (United States and Canada); Rank Film Distributors (International)
- Release date: December 27, 1991
- Running time: 130 minutes
- Country: United States
- Language: English
- Budget: $11 million
- Box office: $119.4 million

Fried Green Tomatoes is a 1991 American Southern Gothic comedy-drama film directed by Jon Avnet, and based on Fannie Flagg's 1987 novel Fried Green Tomatoes at the Whistle Stop Cafe. Written by Flagg and Carol Sobieski, and starring Kathy Bates, Jessica Tandy, Mary Stuart Masterson, Mary-Louise Parker, and Cicely Tyson, the film tells the story of a middle-aged housewife who, unhappy with her life, befriends an elderly lady in a nursing home and is enthralled by the tales she tells of people she used to know.

The film was released in theaters in the United States on December 27, 1991, garnered positive reviews from critics and was a box office success, grossing $119.4 million on a $11 million budget.

Fried Green Tomatoes received nominations for two Academy Awards and two BAFTA awards, as well as nominations for three Golden Globe Awards and a Guldbagge Award.

== Plot ==
Evelyn Couch is a timid housewife in her 40s in 1980s Birmingham, Alabama. Her husband Ed has an aunt with dementia living at an Alabama nursing home. While waiting for Ed in the waiting room, Evelyn meets the elderly Ninny Threadgoode, who says she is staying in the home to keep an old friend company and will then return to her house. Over several encounters, Ninny tells Evelyn about the long-abandoned town of Whistle Stop and its residents. (Note: The film's subplot concerns Evelyn's dissatisfaction with her marriage, her life, her growing confidence, and the developing friendship between her and Ninny. The timeline switches between the present and a flashback story set between World War I and World War II.)

Ninny's tale begins with tomboy Idgie, the youngest member of the Threadgoode family. She and Ruth Jamison are devastated when Buddy, Idgie's beloved older brother and Ruth's suitor, is killed by a train. Idgie remains socially withdrawn well into her adolescence. At the Threadgoode family's request, the straitlaced Ruth befriends a reluctant Idgie, and over the summer they gradually develop a deep attachment.

Ruth eventually moves to Valdosta, Georgia, to marry Frank Bennett. Idgie visits a pregnant Ruth, only to discover that Frank habitually abuses her. Against Frank's violent attempts to stop her, Idgie, together with her brother Julian and Big George, rescue Ruth who returns to Whistle Stop with them, where her son, Buddy Jr., is born. Papa Threadgoode gives Idgie money to start a business and help care for Ruth and Buddy Jr. She and Ruth open the Whistle Stop Cafe, employing the family cook, Sipsey, and her son, Big George, whose excellent barbecue becomes widely popular.

Frank arrives at Whistle Stop to kidnap his infant son, but an unseen assailant thwarts his attempt, and he is soon reported missing. About five years later, Frank's truck surfaces in a nearby river. Idgie becomes a suspect, having threatened Frank for beating Ruth. Sheriff Grady Kilgore detains both her and Big George, and Idgie rejects his offer to release her and pin Frank's supposed murder solely on Big George. During the subsequent trial, Reverend Scroggins provides false testimony that supports both Idgie's and Big George's alibis. Taking into account Frank's reputation for drunkenness and his body never being found, the judge rules his probable death as accidental and dismisses the case against Idgie and Big George. Shortly after the trial, Ruth is diagnosed with terminal cancer and soon dies. When trains stop running through Whistle Stop, the café closes, and the townsfolk drift away.

While listening to Ninny's story and taking more and more pleasure in her company, Evelyn, inspired by the women in the story, starts acting more assertive in her own life. Instead of trying to save her marriage by employing traditionally "womanly" wiles and cooking Ed's kind of food, she begins dressing more casually, exercising, retaliating when people do her wrong in public, and altering the house to her taste. Ed, who has been ignoring her for sports on television, gets interested in her new ways and starts bringing her flowers. She finally tells Ed she is going to bring Ninny there to live with them, despite his opposition to the idea.

When Evelyn goes to see Ninny, she finds out that Ninny's friend has died and she has left the nursing home. Evelyn drives to Whistle Stop and finds her sitting in the empty lot where her now-demolished house had stood. There, Ninny concludes her story by revealing that Sipsey killed Frank by hitting him over the head with a cast-iron skillet and pushed his car into the river, and that Idgie convinced Big George to butcher and barbecue Frank's body, which they later served to Sheriff Curtis Smoot, who relentlessly investigated Frank's disappearance for years.

Evelyn invites Ninny to live with her and Ed, to which she agrees. They pass by Ruth's grave which is freshly adorned with a jar containing honey and a honeycomb. A card reads, "I'll always love you, the Bee Charmer". Ninny had previously told Evelyn the Bee Charmer was Ruth's nickname for Idgie, revealing that she is still alive.

== Cast ==
- Kathy Bates as Evelyn Couch
- Mary Stuart Masterson as Idgie Threadgoode
- Mary-Louise Parker as Ruth Jamison
- Jessica Tandy as Ninny Threadgoode
- Chris O'Donnell as Buddy Threadgoode
- Stan Shaw as Big George Pullman
- Gailard Sartain as Ed Couch
- Tim Scott as Smokey Lonesome
- Gary Basaraba as Grady Kilgore
- Nick Searcy as Frank Bennett
- Lois Smith as Mama Threadgoode
- Cicely Tyson as Sipsey

== Production ==
=== Development ===
Jon Avnet first read the novel in 1987. He was introduced to it by producer Lisa Lindstrom, with whom he worked on television films Heat Wave and Breaking Point. Although he wanted her to give him a synopsis of the story, she insisted he read the book and like her, he loved it. He decided to turn the story into a film and pitched the idea to Norman Lear's company, Act III Communications, who were interested and gave him a small budget for a screenwriter. He hired Carol Sobieski who had written the screenplay for 1982's Annie. She wrote a draft for it as a musical, which he was unhappy with. Sobieski left the project and he hired Flagg, who had been surprised that anyone would want to turn the novel into a film, to develop the script. Although she had some screenwriting experience, she found the process of turning her own novel into a script a strange one. The job was made somewhat easier by the work done by Sobieski and Avnet in choosing which characters from the book were going to be featured, but she found it difficult and also left the project, after writing 70 pages of the screenplay. With no money left to hire another writer, Avnet took the script over himself and spent the next 2–3 years developing it. Flagg gave her blessing to the final draft.

Part of the film finance came from British production company The Rank Organisation; it would be their most successful film of the 1990s.

=== Casting ===
Avnet wrote the film with Jessica Tandy in mind; she expressed excitement about making the film. He had worked with Kathy Bates and Chris O'Donnell on the 1990 film Men Don't Leave before offering them the roles of Evelyn Couch and Buddy Threadgoode respectively. When Bates read the script she loved the characters and was particularly keen to work with Tandy. Mary-Louise Parker was casting director David Rubin's first choice for the role of Ruth Jamison. She read for the part several times, initially unhappy with her own tests. When she read along with Mary Stuart Masterson, they – and the producers – agreed that they had good chemistry.

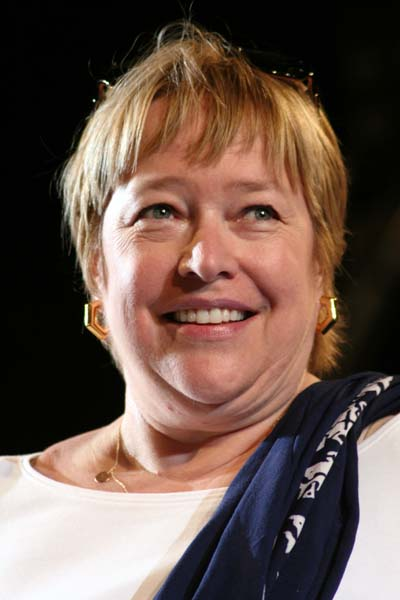
Kathy Bates (2006)

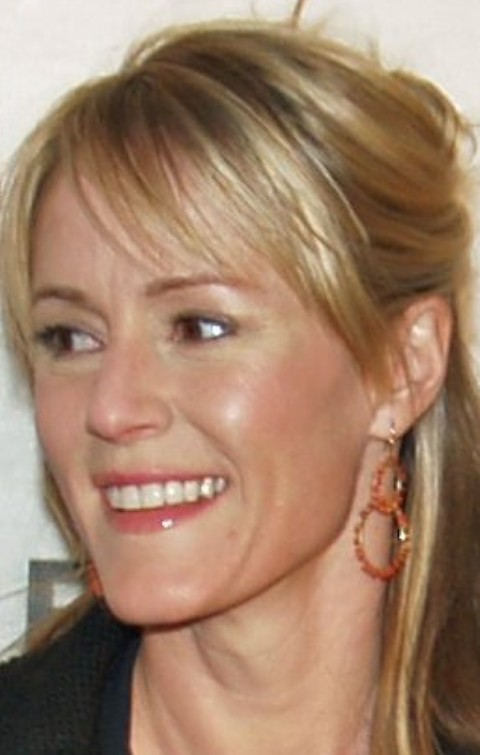
Mary Stuart Masterson (2007)

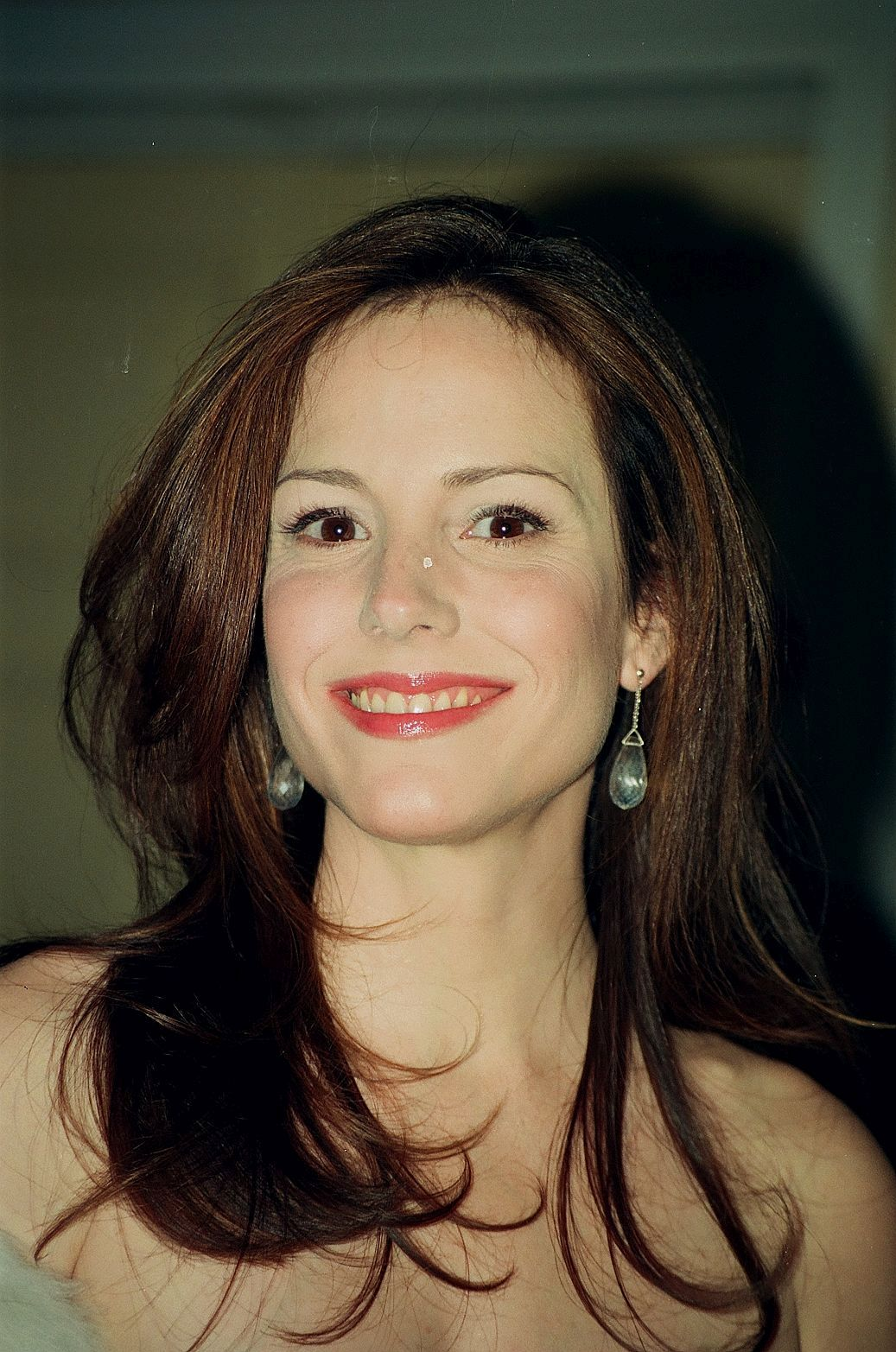
Mary-Louise Parker (1999)

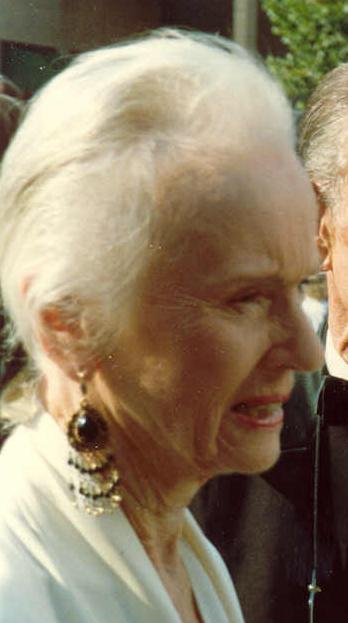
Jessica Tandy (1988)

=== Location and filming ===
Avnet hired Barbara Ling as production designer. Scouting for a location, she found Juliette, Georgia, a town that was, according to Avnet, nearly deserted. The building chosen to be the Whistle Stop Café was formerly an antique and hardware store. It was redesigned as a cafe, with a horseshoe-shaped counter to allow for optimal camera angles.

The scene where Idgie goes to collect honey from a tree stump for Ruth was originally intended to be performed by a stunt double. However, after the latter backed out at the last minute, Masterson volunteered to do it herself. The footage of her covered in a swarm of live bees is seen in the final version of the film.

Flagg based the Whistle Stop restaurant on the real-life Irondale Café in Irondale, Alabama. She was a frequent visitor and it was formerly owned by her great-aunt.

=== Differences between the film and novel ===
Unlike the novel, the film does not make the lesbian romance between the two central characters explicit, instead leaving the relationship between Idgie and Ruth ambiguous. The DVD contains an audio commentary by Avnet in which he refers to the scene of Idgie and Ruth's food fight as a "love scene".

At the time of the film's debut, it was criticized by reviewers and activists for what was seen as "glossing over" the lesbian relationship. But it won an award in 1992 from the Gay & Lesbian Alliance Against Defamation for best feature film with lesbian content.

Although in the book Idgie and Ninny are two distinctly separate characters, at the end of the film it is largely hinted that they are one and the same. This runs counter to two comments Ninny makes when she first meets Evelyn: "I was practically adopted by the Threadgoodes; I married her [Idgie's] brother, Cleo"; and "I had the biggest crush on him. [Buddy Threadgoode, Idgie's older brother]"

== Release ==
Fried Green Tomatoes was given a limited release in the United States on December 27, 1991, opening in five theaters. It went into wide release four weeks later, on January 24, 1992, in 673 theaters. It ran for 19 weeks in total, with its widest release having been 1,331 theaters.

== Reception ==
=== Critical response ===
On the review aggregator website Rotten Tomatoes, 77% of 47 critics' reviews are positive, with an average rating of 6.7/10. The website's consensus reads: "Fried Green Tomatoes' tearjerking drama is undeniably manipulative, but in the hands of a skilled cast that includes Jessica Tandy and Kathy Bates, it's also powerfully effective." Metacritic, which uses a weighted average, assigned the film a score of 64 out of 100, based on 21 critics, indicating "generally favorable" reviews. Audiences polled by CinemaScore gave the film an average grade of "A" on an A+ to F scale.

Critics enjoyed the narrative, but found it conventional and predictable. The adaptation of the separate narrative of book to the screen was criticized by Time Out as "clumsy", though Roger Ebert praised the performances, Janet Maslin praised the costume and production design, and Emanuel Levy praised the cinematography and score. The cast drew praise for their performances, particularly Masterson and Tandy.

In 2005, Fried Green Tomatoes was nominated by the American Film Institute for its "AFI's 100 Years...100 Cheers" list of most inspiring movies.

=== Box office ===
Fried Green Tomatoes grossed $82.4 million domestically (United States and Canada), and $37 million in other territories, for a worldwide total of $119.4 million, against a budget of $11 million. During its initial four weeks, the film appeared in no more than 35 theatres, but spent the following 10 weeks, in wide release, in the Top 10 (peaking at No. 2) at the domestic box office. According to Box Office Mojo, it ranked at No. 11 for all films released in the US in 1991.

== Accolades ==
Award	Date	Category	Nominee(s)	Result	Ref.
Academy Awards	March 30, 1992	Best Supporting Actress	Jessica Tandy	Nominated	
Academy Awards	March 30, 1992	Best Adapted Screenplay	Fannie Flagg, Carol Sobieski	Nominated	
BMI Awards	May 19, 1993	Motion Picture Composer Award	Thomas Newman	Won	
British Academy Film Awards	March 21, 1993	Best Actress in a Leading Role	Jessica Tandy	Nominated	
British Academy Film Awards	March 21, 1993	Best Actress in a Supporting Role	Kathy Bates	Nominated	
GLAAD Media Award	April 11, 1992	Outstanding Film – Wide Release	Fried Green Tomatoes	Won	
Golden Globe Awards	January 18, 1992	Best Motion Picture - Musical or Comedy	Fried Green Tomatoes	Nominated	
Golden Globe Awards	January 18, 1992	Best Actress in a Motion Picture - Musical or Comedy	Kathy Bates	Nominated	
Golden Globe Awards	January 18, 1992	Best Supporting Actress – Motion Picture	Jessica Tandy	Nominated	
Guldbagge Awards	March 1, 1993	Best Foreign Film	Fried Green Tomatoes	Nominated	
Writers Guild of America Awards	1992	Best Adapted Screenplay	Fannie Flagg and Carol Sobieski	Nominated	

== Soundtrack ==
Fried Green Tomatoes

Studio album by Various Artists
- Released: December 31, 1991
- Genre: Soundtrack
- Length: 39:24
- Label: MCA

The Fried Green Tomatoes: Original Motion Picture Soundtrack was supervised by Arthur Baker, who also produced several of the songs. Baker and American singer-songwriter Grayson Hugh co-arranged and recorded Bob Dylan's song "I'll Remember You" for the end-title song. British singer-songwriter Paul Young appears with the song "What Becomes of the Brokenhearted," which peaked at No. 22 on the Billboard Hot 100 in March 1992. The soundtrack featured Patti LaBelle performing Bessie Jackson's 1933 blues song, "Barbecue Bess".

The original score, composed by Thomas Newman, was released as Fried Green Tomatoes in June 1992.

== Home media ==
The VHS release from MCA/Universal Home Video was issued in North America on August 20, 1992.

The 137-minute "extended" collector's edition DVD for Region 1 was released by Universal Studios on April 18, 2000. The DVD features a documentary about the making of the film, commentary by Jon Avnet, original theatrical trailer, and the film poster campaign. The region free Blu-ray was released March 4, 2014.

In the United Kingdom, the film was released on VHS as Fried Green Tomatoes at the Whistle Stop Cafe by Columbia Tristar Home Video on October 2, 1992. The DVD for Region 2 was released by Carlton Visual Entertainment on September 9, 2002.

== Legacy ==
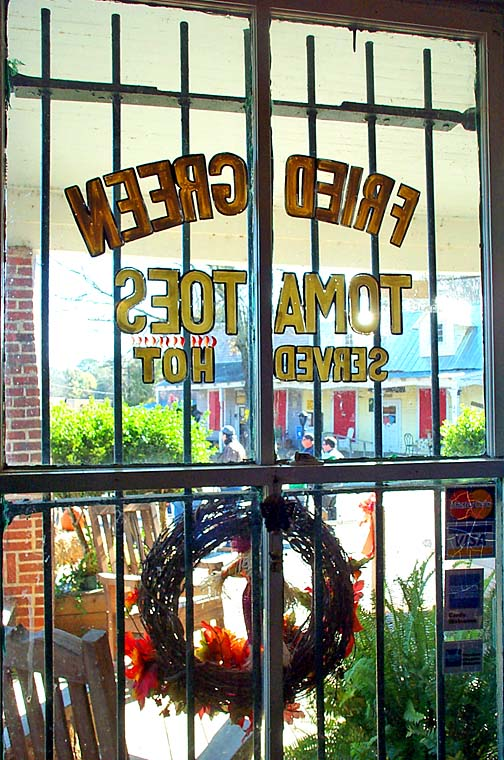
Inside the Whistle Stop Cafe, Juliette, Georgia.

After the release of Fried Green Tomatoes, the town of Juliette saw an influx of tourists and, with Jon Avnet's encouragement, locals opened the Whistle Stop Café, recreated to mirror the film set. Although "Whistle Stop Café" is a registered trademark, other establishments have appeared using that name.

The film caused the fried green tomatoes food dish to be known as a delicacy of the Southern United States, when it previously did not have such a status.
