= Fried Green Tomatoes at the Whistle Stop Cafe =

1987 novel by Fannie Flagg

- First edition cover
- Author: Fannie Flagg
- Language: English
- Genre: Fiction
- Publisher: Random House
- Publication date: August 12, 1987
- Publication place: United States
- Media type: Print
- Pages: 403 pp
- ISBN: 0-394-56152-X
- OCLC: 15792039
- Dewey Decimal: 813/.54 19
- LC Class: PS3556.L26 F7 1987

Fried Green Tomatoes at the Whistle Stop Cafe is a 1987 novel by American author Fannie Flagg. Set in Alabama, it weaves together the past and the present through the blossoming friendship between Evelyn Couch, a middle-aged housewife, and Ninny Threadgoode, an elderly woman who lives in a nursing home. Every week Evelyn visits Ninny, who recounts stories of her youth in Whistle Stop, Alabama, where her sister-in-law, Idgie, and her friend, Ruth, ran a café. These stories, along with Ninny's friendship, enable Evelyn to begin a new, satisfying life while allowing the people and stories of Ninny's youth to live on. The book explores themes of family, aging, lesbianism, and the dehumanizing effects of racism on both black and white people. It was adapted as a feature film, Fried Green Tomatoes, which was released in 1991.

== Plot ==
Throughout the novel the narrator and time period change, and chapter headings establish the date and source of the chapter. The narration alternates between the form of the fictional newsletter The Weems Weekly, the Threadgoodes' house in Birmingham, and an omniscient narration. The framing story, set in 1986, presents Evelyn Couch, who goes weekly with her husband to visit his mother in a nursing home. During one visit, Evelyn befriends Ninny Threadgoode, another resident. Ninny tells Evelyn stories of her youth in Whistle Stop in 1927 and succeeding years. Between subsequent visits, Evelyn begins to adopt aspects of figures in these stories as role models.

Ninny says she was an orphan raised by the Threadgoodes, and that she eventually married one of their sons. She principally talks about the youngest daughter, Imogene "Idgie" Threadgoode, an unrepentant tomboy who became reclusive after her brother, Buddy, was killed on the railway.

Ruth Jamison comes to live with the Threadgoodes while teaching at the Vacation Bible School. Idgie becomes enamored of her and is saddened when Ruth leaves Whistle Stop to marry Frank Bennett. Frank turns out to be a violent, abusive man who often beats Ruth, but she stays with him until her mother's death. Afterward, Ruth sends Idgie a message appealing for help. Idgie, along with several men, rescue her and her son from Bennett. Intimidated by Big George—the Threadgoodes' handyman—Bennett does not resist.

With money from her father, Idgie establishes the Whistle Stop Cafe, with Sipsey (Big George's adoptive mother) and her daughter-in-law Onzell as cooks. Idgie becomes secondary guardian to Ruth's son, Buddy Jr. A gossip columnist refers to him as "Ruth and Idgie's son", indicating recognition of the women's alternative family. Buddy becomes known as 'Stump' after losing an arm in an accident. The café quickly becomes known to homeless people all over the US during the Great Depression as a welcoming place to receive a meal. The most recurrent guest is "Smokey Lonesome" Phillips, who secretly loves Ruth. When Ruth dies of cancer, Idgie is heartbroken.

After the railroad yard closes, the cafe (and ultimately the town) ceases operation. Several years later, Idgie and Big George are arrested by the county for Frank Bennett's murder. The case is dismissed when the local minister, repaying Idgie for helping his son, falsely testifies she and Big George were at a three-day revival when Bennett went missing. Bennett's body was never found. It is later revealed that Sipsey killed him when he attempted to kidnap his and Ruth's son. His remains were barbecued by Big George and fed to the detectives investigating Frank's disappearance at the time.

Stump recounts the stories of his guardians to his daughter and granddaughter. Big George's sons, Jasper and Artis, take independent paths: Jasper as a pullman porter and Artis as a gambler and lady's man. After the decline of Whistle Stop, Idgie and her brother Julian relocated to Florida, where they operated a roadside food stand.

Inspired by these stories, Evelyn starts working outside the home, selling Mary Kay Cosmetics. At Mrs. Threadgoode's urging, she gets treated for negative symptoms of menopause. She also confronts various long-held fears. Evelyn becomes happier. While on vacation, she receives a letter from Mrs. Hartman, a neighbor of Mrs. Threadgoode, telling her of the latter's death and of her having bequeathed various trinkets to Evelyn.

== Themes ==
Although Idgie and Ruth's relationship is not explicitly described as lesbian, every resident both knows about it and accepts it; lesbianism is a theme in the novel.

The novel explores women's aging through the characters of Evelyn and Mrs. Threadgoode. Evelyn goes through menopause and Mrs. Threadgoode deteriorates with age. As the novel follows Sipsey's family, it analyzes the stark challenges they and other African Americans faced in society from the 1920s to the late 1980s. Memories and storytelling are important elements of the novel. The moral justifications of murder and euthanasia are touched upon.

Food is another literary theme in the novel. At the end of the book, Flagg included the recipes served by the cafe (including their signature fried green tomatoes).

== Development ==
The "Whistle Stop Cafe" is loosely based on the Irondale Cafe in Irondale, Alabama, a suburb near Flagg's birthplace. The cafe was bought by Flagg's aunt, Bess Fortenberry, in 1932 and run for four decades by her and two friends. It is still operating and, like the fictional cafe, is known for its fried green tomatoes.

== Reception ==
Fried Green Tomatoes at the Whistle Stop Cafe spent 36 weeks on The New York Times Best Seller List.

Harper Lee praised the book in the publisher's Reader's Guide, saying, "Airplanes and television have removed the Threadgoodes from the Southern scene. Happily for us, Fannie Flagg has preserved a whole community of them in a richly comic, poignant narrative that records the exuberance of their lives, the sadness of their departure. Idgie Threadgoode is a true original: Huckleberry Finn would have tried to marry her!"

== Adaptations ==
Flagg and Carol Sobieski wrote the screenplay for adaptation of the novel as a film, Fried Green Tomatoes, released in 1991. It is directed by Jon Avnet and stars Kathy Bates, Jessica Tandy, Mary Stuart Masterson, Mary-Louise Parker and Cicely Tyson. The film adaptation is a story within a story of Southern female friendship and love.

The film was nominated for two Academy Awards and received an award from the Gay & Lesbian Alliance Against Defamation (GLAAD).

In October 2020 it was reported that NBC was developing a television series adaptation of the film/novel. The series was to be produced by Universal Television with Norman Lear as executive producer and Jennifer Cecil as writer and executive producer. Reba McEntire was an executive producer and would have a starring role. However, in 2021 it was decided the show would not move forward.

== Sequel ==
On October 27th, 2020, in a Random House virtual event, Flagg announced the release of a sequel novel to Fried Green Tomatoes at Whistle Stop Cafe, titled The Wonder Boy of Whistle Stop, following Bud's return to the town.
