= George Columbus Barnhardt =

United States Army general (1868–1930)

George Barnhardt
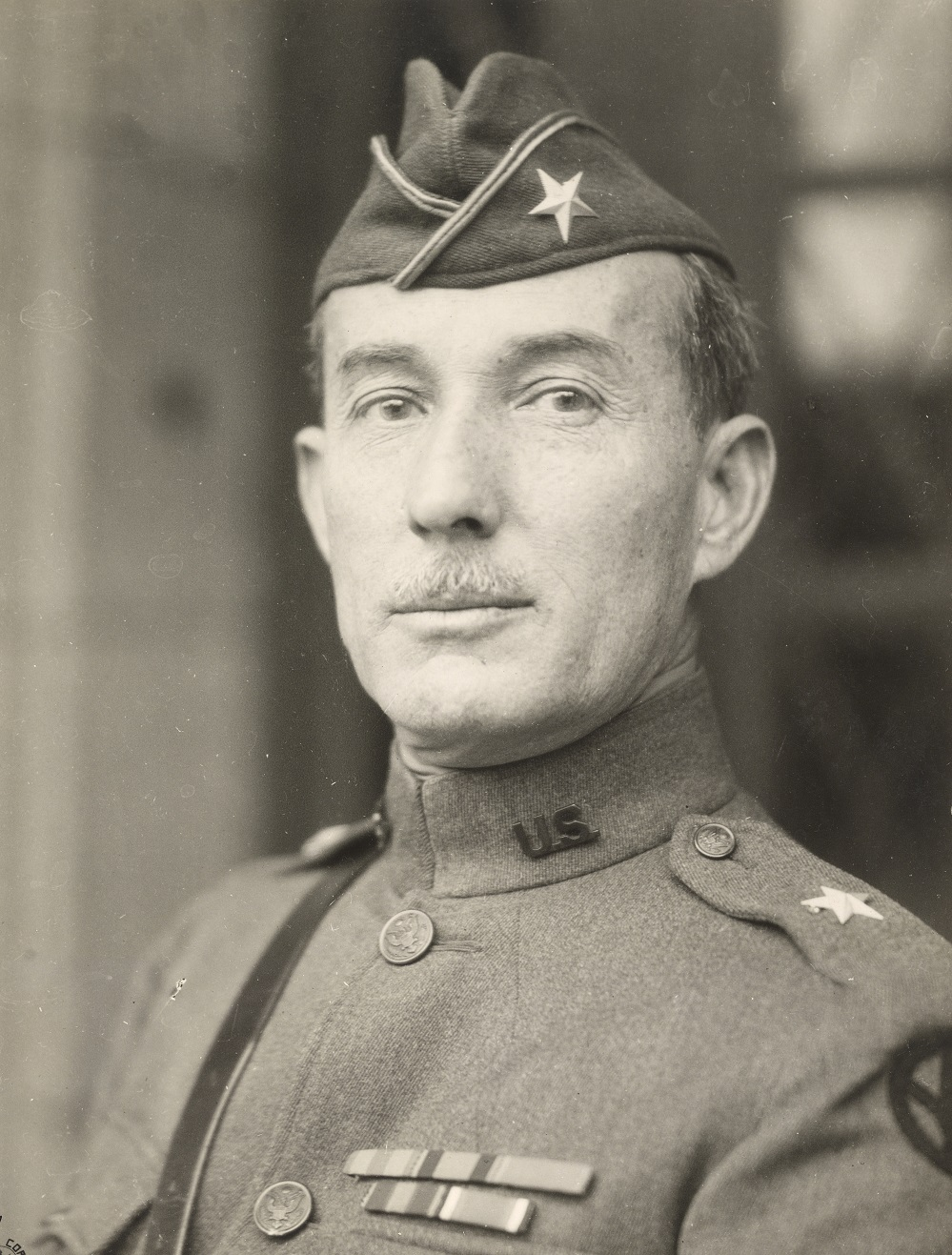
- George C. Barnhardt as a brigadier general in Prüm, 1919.
- Born: December 28, 1868; Gold Hill, North Carolina, U.S.
- Died: December 10, 1930 (aged 61); Fort Bliss, Texas, U.S.
- Burial place: West Point Cemetery
- Spouse: Florence Rice “Floy” Rodman (m. 1895–1930, his death)
- Children: 1
- Military career
- Allegiance: United States
- Branch: United States Army
- Service years: 1892–1930
- Rank: Brigadier General
- Service number: 0-400
- Unit: Cavalry Branch
- Commands: 28th Regiment; 2nd Brigade; 178th Brigade; 6th Cavalry Regiment; 1st Cavalry Division
- Wars: Spanish–American War; China Relief Expedition; World War I
- Awards: Distinguished Service Medal; Croix de Guerre with Palm (France); Legion of Honor (Officer) (France)

George Columbus Barnhardt (December 28, 1868 – December 10, 1930) was a United States Army officer who served during World War I. He attained the rank of brigadier general, and was best known for his command of the 28th Regiment, 2nd Brigade, 178th Brigade, 6th Cavalry Regiment, and 1st Cavalry Division.

== Early life ==
Barnhardt was born in Gold Hill, North Carolina on December 28, 1868, a son of Marshall Lank Barnhardt and Sarah Pines (Dunlap) Barnhardt. In June 1892, he graduated number seventeen of sixty-two from the United States Military Academy. Several of his fellow classmates included future general officers, such as Charles Pelot Summerall, Tracy Campbell Dickson, Julian Robert Lindsey, William Ruthven Smith, James Ancil Shipton, Louis Chapin Covell, Preston Brown, George Blakely, John M. Palmer, Frank W. Coe, Howard Russell Hickok, Robert Mearns, Henry Howard Whitney, William Chamberlaine, John E. Woodward and Peter Weimer Davison.

== Military career ==
Barnhardt was commissioned a second lieutenant in the Sixth Cavalry and served at Fort McKinney, New York, from September 30, 1892, to October 2, 1894.

During the Spanish–American War, he commanded a cavalry troop in the Santiago campaign. After the war, he spent two years at Fort Leavenworth, in Kansas and then participated in the China Relief Expedition, followed by four years in the Philippines.

From 1907 to 1909, he was in Cuba and from 1909 to 1912 was adjutant of the 15th Cavalry. Barnhardt then did General Staff duty from 1913 to 1916 and was on the Mexican border. In 1916, he was also serving with the Quartermaster Corps. He commanded the 329th Infantry at Camp Sherman, in Ohio, and was in France with the American Expeditionary Force after the American entry into World War I.

On August 1, 1918, he was promoted to brigadier general of the national army and assigned to the 178th Brigade in France and Germany. From 1921 to 1925, after arriving back in the United States, Barnhardt was a General Staff colonel, and from 1925 to 1927 he commanded the Sixth Cavalry. He also commanded the Military District of Washington from July to September 1927, and his last assignment was the command of the 22d Infantry Brigade in Hawaii.

== Awards ==
Barnhardt was awarded the Distinguished Service Medal from the United States, as well as the Croix de Guerre with Palm and the Legion of Honor (Officer) from France. The citation for his Army DSM reads:

The President of the United States of America, authorized by Act of Congress, July 9, 1918, takes pleasure in presenting the Army Distinguished Service Medal to Brigadier General George Columbus Barnhardt, United States Army, for exceptionally meritorious and distinguished services to the Government of the United States, in a duty of great responsibility during World War I. As Commander of the 28th Infantry, General Barnhardt handled his regiment so brilliantly under severe conditions during the St. Mihiel offensive, 12 and 13 September 1818, and during the battle of the Meuse-Argonne from 1 to 11 October 1918, that the regiment demonstrated an unusually high degree of efficiency and morale. He repeatedly displayed superior tactical judgment, and by his exceptional ability, leadership, and devotion to duty, he effectively executed the most difficult missions assigned to his regiment. Later, in command of the 2d Infantry Brigade and then the 178th Infantry Brigade, he again displayed high efficiency and military attainments, thereby rendering with all his commands important services to the American Expeditionary Forces.

== Death and legacy ==
Barnhardt died at Ft. Bliss on December 10, 1930. (Note: Davis gives an incorrect death date of May 14, 1924.) He was temporarily interred at Concordia Cemetery in El Paso, and permanently interred at West Point Cemetery.

== Bibliography ==
- Cullum, George W. 1891. Biographical register of the officers and graduates of the U.S. military academy at West Point, N.Y. Boston and New York: Houghton, Mifflin and Company. OCLC 1417240

Military offices
Preceded by Charles Symmonds	Commanding General 1st Cavalry Division; October–December 1930	Succeeded by Ewing E. Booth
