= Julian Robert Lindsey =

United States Army general

Julian Lindsey
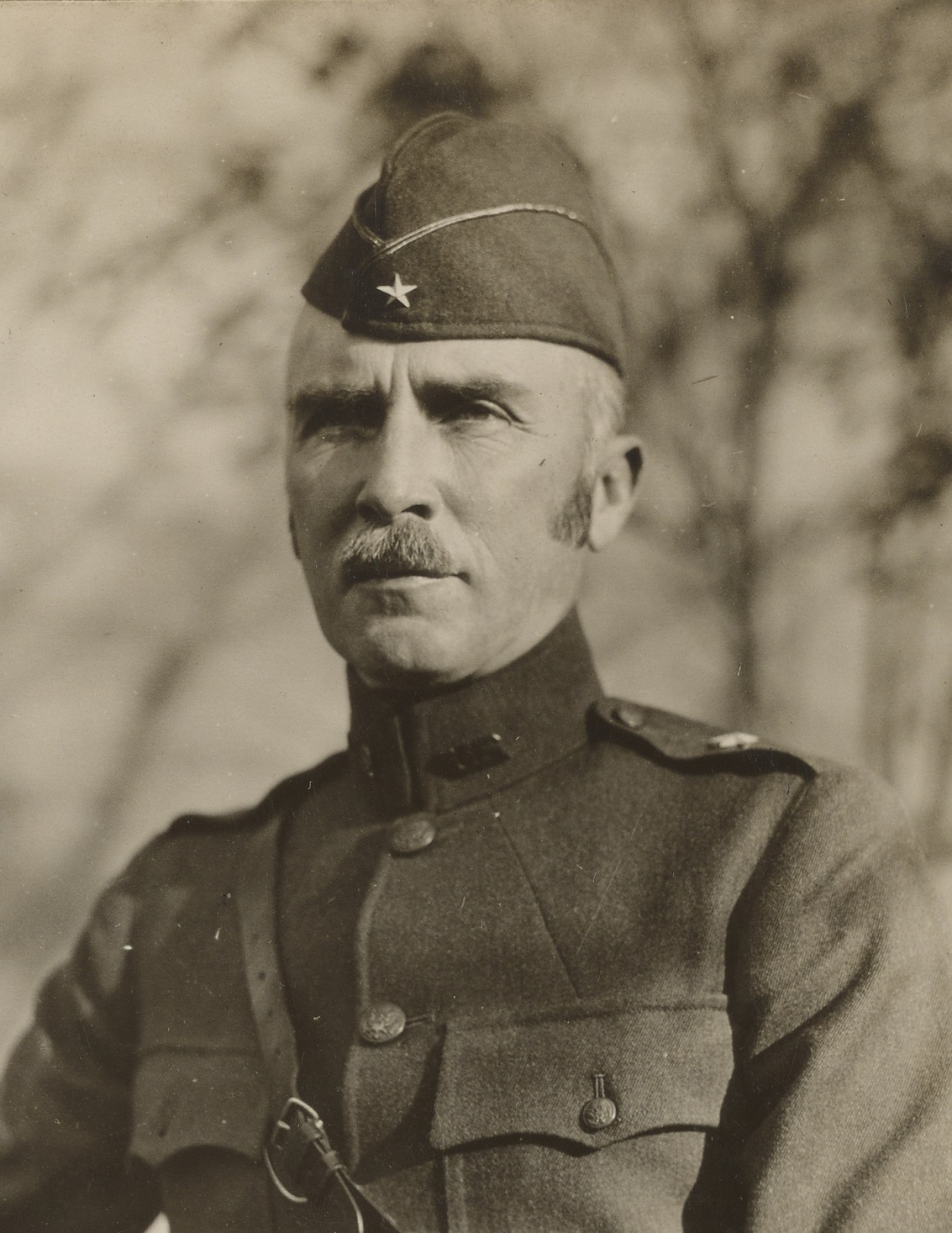
- Brigadier General Julian Lindsey, pictured here in November 1918.
- Born: 16 March 1871; Irwinton, Georgia, United States
- Died: 27 June 1948 (aged 77); Washington, D.C., United States
- Burial place: West Point Cemetery, West Point, New York, United States
- Children: Julian B. Lindsey
- Military career
- Allegiance: United States
- Branch: United States Army
- Service years: 1892–1934
- Rank: Major General
- Service number: 0-405
- Unit: Cavalry Branch
- Commands: 328th Regiment; 164th Brigade; 14th Cavalry Regiment; 7th Cavalry Brigade
- Conflicts: Boxer Rebellion; Pancho Villa Expedition; World War I
- Awards: Army Distinguished Service Medal

Major General Julian Robert Lindsey (16 March 1871 – 27 June 1948) was a United States Army cavalry officer in the late 19th and early 20th centuries. He served in the China Relief Expedition, the Pancho Villa Expedition and commanded a regiment, and later a brigade, in World War I. Sergeant Alvin York, perhaps the most well known American soldier of World War I, also served in Lindsey's brigade.

== Military career ==
Julian Lindsey was born on 16 March 1871, in Irwinton, Georgia. His parents were John W. Lindsey and Julia Lindsey. He entered the United States Military Academy and graduated four years later with the class of 1892, ranked 32nd of 62 cadets. His classmates included numerous men who would later attain general officer rank, such as Charles Pelot Summerall, Tracy Campbell Dickson, Frank W. Coe, William Ruthven Smith, James Ancil Shipton, Louis Chapin Covell, Preston Brown, George Blakely, Robert Mearns, Peter Weimer Davison, Howard Russell Hickok, Henry Howard Whitney, John E. Woodward, John McAuley Palmer and George Columbus Barnhardt.

His first assignment upon graduating was to the 9th Cavalry Regiment. After that, he served as an instructor at the Military Academy for four years before he became Adjutant General of Georgia.

During the Boxer Rebellion Lindsey joined the 15th Infantry as an Aide-de-Camp to Adna Chaffee in the China Relief Expedition in 1900.

He served at Fort Myer until December 1912, when he returned again to West Point as an instructor. He also installed a polo team at the academy in 1916. Lindsey was part of the Pancho Villa Expedition in 1916 and temporarily commanded the 11th Cavalry Regiment in Mai 1917. He returned to Fort Oglethorpe in Georgia.

He was assigned to Camp Gordon in 1917, the same year of the American entry into World War I, as commander of the 328th Infantry Regiment and promoted to colonel in the National Army in August that year. As part of the American Expeditionary Forces he took command of the 164th Infantry Brigade, 82nd Division and was promoted to brigadier general of the National Army in April 1918. Soon Lindsey asked for the replacement of two of his regiment commanders, Colonels Frank D. Ely and Hunter B. Nelson, and the chief medical officer of his brigade, for not meeting the standards.

During the Meuse-Argonne Offensive in early October 1918, Lindsey's brigade fought in the battles around the Aire river, Cornay and Buzancy.

Colonel Frank D. Ely, whom Lindsey had tried to remove before, fought with his 327th Regiment at Cornay. After capturing the village on 9 October 1918, he lost it to a German counter-attack a few hours later, winning it again the next day. After Ely had reported his formation exhausted on 11 October after continuous fighting and gas attacks and had ordered a retreat of the 327th, Lindsey relieved him of his command on the battlefield, to be replaced by Lieutenant Colonel Frank H. Burr. Burr reported that 80% of the men of the 327th that were left to be unfit for service, which resulted in the withdrawal of the formation on 14 October. Ely requested an investigation of Lindsey's decision, and Lindsey got in trouble with his commanding general Hunter Liggett.

After the war, Lindsey returned to the rank of lieutenant colonel. He graduated from the General Staff School in 1920 and was promoted to colonel effective 1 July 1920. Lindsey graduated from the Army War College in 1921 and then held a series of posts. He commanded the 14th Cavalry Regiment from 1925 to 1928 and was chief of staff of the 61st Cavalry Division from 1928 to 1932.

He was selected to command the newly formed 7th Cavalry Brigade (mech) in March 1932. He held that command at Fort Knox as a brigadier general of the army until May 1934. George Hofmann reports in his work about the mechanization of U.S. Cavalry, that Lindsey would be most remembered on this last command he held before his retirement for playing golf, entertaining and creating a golf course named after him.

In 1942, the U.S. Congress passed legislation that advanced World War I general officers by one rank on the retired list if they had been recommended for a wartime promotion which they did not receive, and had received the Medal of Honor, Distinguished Service Cross, or the Army Distinguished Service Medal. As a result of this law's enactment, Lindsey was promoted to major general.

== Family and later life ==
Lindsey married Hannah Broster in 1904. His wife died shortly after their son, Julian B. Lindsey, was born in 1905. In retirement, Lindsey moved to Washington, D.C., where he lived in the Army and Navy Club. He died from a heart attack on 27 June 1948, in the Walter Reed Hospital. Lindsey was buried at the West Point Cemetery on 1 July 1948.

== Bibliography ==
- Davis, Henry Blaine Jr. (1998). Generals in Khaki. Raleigh, NC: Pentland Press. pp. 41–42. ISBN 1571970886. OCLC 231779136.
