= Henry Howard Whitney =

United States Army general

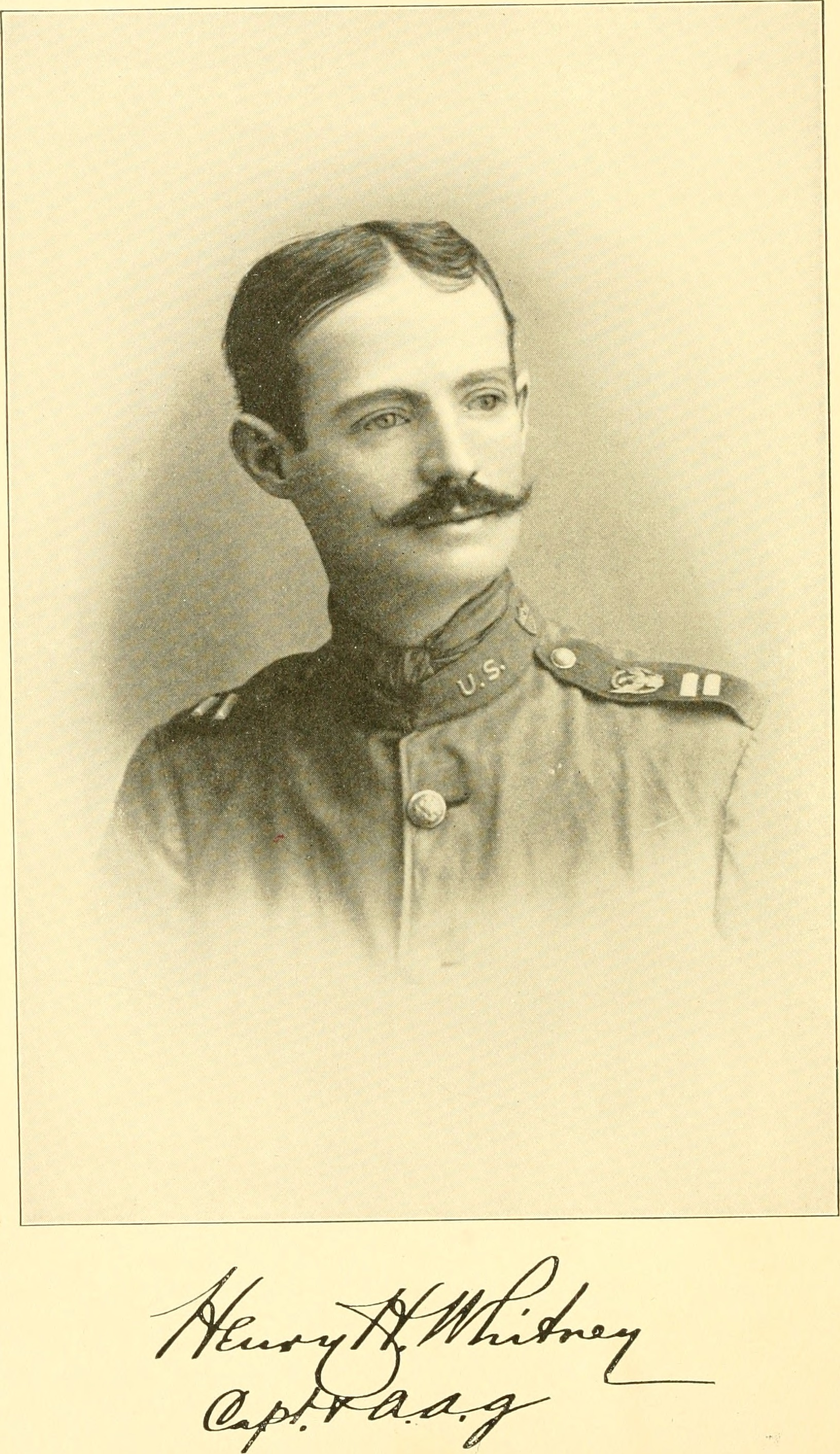
- Whitney as a captain at the time of the Spanish–American War.
- Born: December 25, 1866; Glen Hope, Pennsylvania, US
- Died: April 2, 1949 (aged 82); Madison, New Jersey, US
- Burial place: Arlington National Cemetery
- Military career
- Allegiance: United States of America
- Branch: United States Army
- Service years: 1892–1920
- Rank: Brigadier General
- Service number: 0-13460
- Conflicts: Spanish–American War; Pancho Villa Expedition; World War I
- Awards: Distinguished Service Cross; Army Distinguished Service Medal; French Legion of Honor (Officer); Romanian Order of the Crown (Commander); Order of Prince Danilo I (Commander) Montenegro

Henry Howard Whitney (December 25, 1866 – April 2, 1949) was a United States military officer who attained the rank of brigadier general. He was known primarily for the spy missions he carried out in Puerto Rico and Cuba prior to the start of the Spanish–American War.

== Early life ==
Whitney was born in Glen Hope, Pennsylvania on December 25, 1866. The son of a clergyman and Union Army veteran of the American Civil War, he graduated from Dickinson Seminary and passed a competitive examination for appointment to the United States Military Academy in 1888. He graduated number 11 of 62 in the class of 1892, and was the class president for all four of his years at West Point. His classmates included numerous men who would later attain general officer rank, such as Charles Pelot Summerall, Tracy Campbell Dickson, Frank W. Coe, William Ruthven Smith, James Ancil Shipton, Louis Chapin Covell, Preston Brown, George Blakely, Robert Mearns, Peter Weimer Davison, Howard Russell Hickok, Julian Robert Lindsey, John E. Woodward, John McAuley Palmer and George Columbus Barnhardt.

== Start of career ==
Whitney was commissioned in the 4th Field Artillery. He was on special duty at the War Department from 1896 to 1898. In 1898, he was appointed Military Attaché to the American legation in Buenos Aires, and soon afterwards agreed to undertake a covert mission for the Secretary of War in anticipation of the Spanish–American War.

== Spanish–American War ==
Whitney disguised himself as an English sailor, evaded capture by Spanish authorities, and made a military reconnaissance of Puerto Rico and Cuba, thereby gaining intelligence upon which General Nelson A. Miles based the war's Puerto Rican Campaign, and General William Rufus Shafter based his campaign in Cuba. In 1918, Whitney was awarded the Distinguished Service Cross for heroism in carrying out this spy mission. The citation for the medal reads:

The President of the United States of America, authorized by Act of Congress, July 9, 1918, takes pleasure in presenting the Distinguished Service Cross to Captain (Infantry) Henry Howard Whitney, United States Army, for extraordinary heroism while serving as Assistant Adjutant General, U.S. Volunteers, in action in connection with operations on the island of Puerto Rico in May, 1898, under disguise and in the midst of an enemy.

Whitney served throughout the war as an assistant adjutant on the Miles's staff; after the war he was appointed as an aide-de-camp to Miles, and accompanied him on his around the world tour from 1902 to 1903.

After the war, Whitney served in the Philippines; commanded the Presidio of San Francisco and Fort Point, San Francisco during the Panama–Pacific International Exposition; and served on the Mexican border during the Pancho Villa Expedition.

== World War I ==
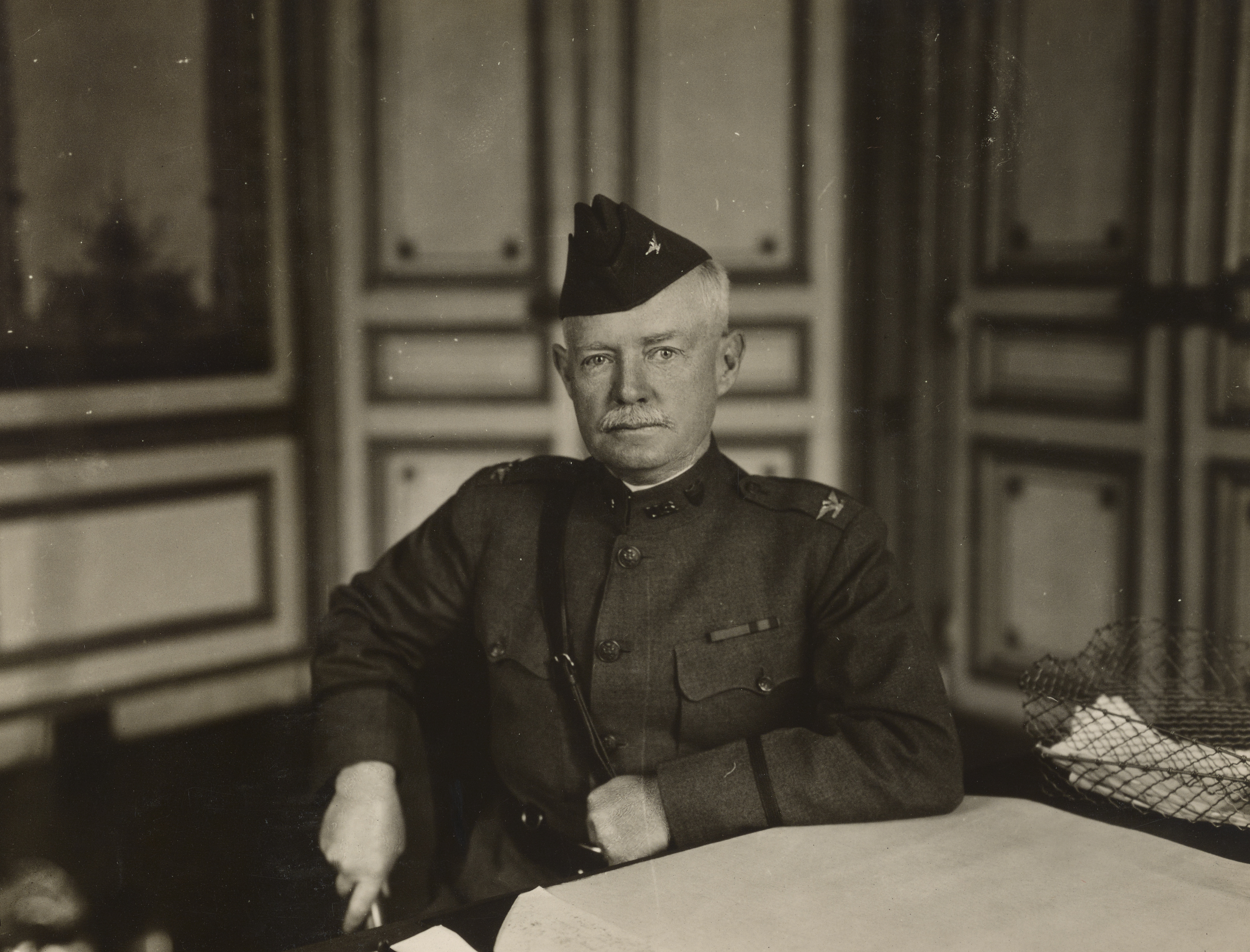
Colonel Whitney, chief of staff of the U.S. forces in Paris District, at the District's headquarters, Paris, France, October 1918.

During World War I, Whitney commanded the 63rd Field Artillery Brigade and was promoted to temporary brigadier general. He was later appointed a member of the staff of the American Expeditionary Forces headquarters, and was Chief of Staff for the Military District of Paris. Whitney retired as a colonel in 1920, and in 1930 he was promoted to brigadier general on the retired list as the result of a federal law which allowed World War I general officers to retire at the highest rank they had held.

== Retirement and death ==
After the war, Whitney lived in California, where he was the president of a real estate finance company. He subsequently moved to New York City. Whitney died Madison, New Jersey on April 2, 1949. He was buried at Arlington National Cemetery, Section 3, Site 1920 EH.

== Awards ==
In addition to the Distinguished Service Cross, Whitney received the Army Distinguished Service Medal, French Legion of Honor (Officer), Romanian Order of the Crown (Commander), and Montenegro's Order of Prince Danilo I (Commander).

== Family ==
In 1897, Whitney married Ellen Wadsworth Closson, the daughter of Brigadier General Henry W. Closson; they were the parents of two children, Julie and Henry Wadsworth Whitney (1907–1958). Henry W. Whitney was a career Army officer who retired as a colonel; he is buried along with his father and mother at Arlington National Cemetery.

== Sources ==
- Whitney, Henry Wadsworth. "Obituary, Henry Howard Whitney". apps.westpointaog.org. New York: West Point Association of Graduates. Archived from the original on December 20, 2016.
- Tucker, Spencer (2009). The Encyclopedia of the Spanish-American and Philippine-American Wars. Vol. 1. Santa Barbara, CA: ABC CLIO. p. 697. ISBN 978-1-85109-951-1.
