= Peter Weimer Davison =

American Brigadier General

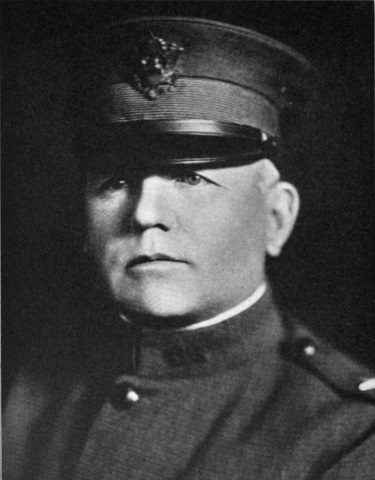
- From 1921's Annual report, published by the Association of Graduates of the United States Military Academy
- Born: May 15, 1869; Waupun, Wisconsin
- Died: February 12, 1920 (aged 50); Staten Island, New York
- Burial place: Forest Mound Cemetery, Waupun, Wisconsin
- Spouse(s): Mary Adele Casey (m. 1896-1898, her death); Esther Fleming (m. 1913-1920, his death)
- Military career
- Allegiance: United States
- Branch: United States Army
- Service years: 1892–1920
- Rank: Brigadier General
- Unit: US Army Infantry Branch
- Commands: 8th Infantry Regiment; 16th Division; Fort D. A. Russell
- Conflicts: Spanish–American War; Philippine–American War; World War I
- Awards: Navy Cross

Peter Weimer Davison (May 15, 1869 – February 12, 1920) was an American brigadier general during World War I.

== Early life and education ==
Peter Davison was born on his family's farm near Waupun, Wisconsin on May 15, 1869. He attended the United States Military Academy (USMA), graduating 45th with the class of 1892. During his time at the USMA, he helped found and played on the academy's football team. His classmates included numerous men who would later rise to the rank of brigadier general or higher, such as Charles Pelot Summerall (who would become Chief of Staff of the United States Army), Tracy Campbell Dickson, Frank W. Coe, William Ruthven Smith, James Ancil Shipton, George Blakely, Robert Mearns, Julian Robert Lindsey, Howard Russell Hickok, Henry Howard Whitney, John E. Woodward, John McAuley Palmer and George Columbus Barnhardt.

== Military career ==
As a second lieutenant, Davison served in the 22nd Infantry Regiment. He served in Montana from 1892 to 1896 and in Nebraska from 1896 to 1898. In 1899, he served in the Philippines with his regiment. Davison advanced through the ranks and was appointed to the rank of colonel on August 5, 1917. Davison commanded the 8th Infantry to September 1918. From October 1918 through February 1919, he commanded the 16th Division. From February 1919 to May 1919, he commanded Fort D. A. Russell in Cheyenne, Wyoming. In May 1919, he was assigned as executive officer of the Hoboken, New Jersey Port of Embarkation. he received the Navy Cross for his World War I service.

== Personal life ==
Davison was a Freemason and an Episcopalian.

Davison married Mary Adele Casey, the daughter of Colonel James Casey, on September 9, 1896. She died in 1898. Davison married Esther Fleming on April 11, 1913.

== Death and legacy ==
Davison died at a hospital on Staten Island, New York on February 12, 1920. He was buried at Forest Mound Cemetery in Waupun.
