= Charles Pelot Summerall =

12th Chief of Staff of the United States Army

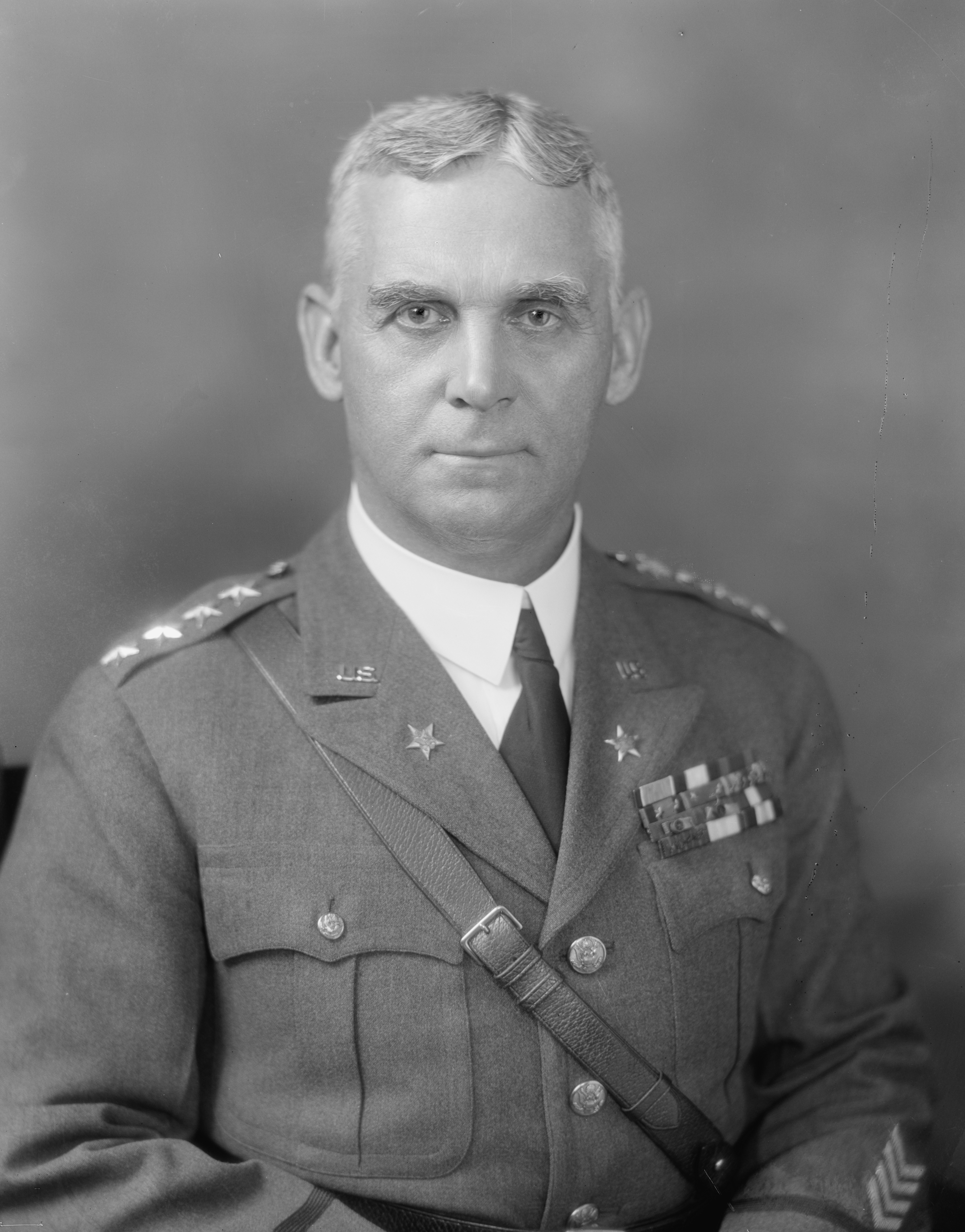
- Born: March 4, 1867; Blounts Ferry, Columbia County, Florida, United States
- Died: May 14, 1955 (aged 88); Washington, D.C., United States
- Burial place: Arlington National Cemetery
- Military career
- Allegiance: United States
- Branch: United States Army
- Service years: 1888–1931
- Rank: General
- Units: Infantry Branch; Field Artillery Branch
- Commands: Chief of Staff of the United States Army; Hawaiian Department; IV Corps; IX Corps; V Corps; 1st Division; 67th Field Artillery Brigade; 1st Field Artillery Brigade; Fort Flagler; Fort William H. Seward; Fort Lawton
- Conflicts: Spanish–American War; Philippine–American War; China Relief Expedition; World War I
- Awards: Distinguished Service Cross; Army Distinguished Service Medal; Silver Star (4)
- Other work: President of The Citadel (1931–1953)

General Charles Pelot Summerall (March 4, 1867 – May 14, 1955) was a senior United States Army officer. He commanded the 1st Infantry Division in World War I, was Chief of Staff of the United States Army from 1926 to 1930, and was President of The Citadel between 1931 and 1953.

== Childhood and education ==
Summerall was born in Blounts Ferry, Columbia County, Florida, on March 4, 1867, and attended the Porter Military Academy in South Carolina from 1882 to 1885. After graduation, he worked as a school teacher for three years. In 1888 he enrolled in the United States Military Academy (USMA) at West Point, New York, graduating in June 1892. His classmates included numerous men who would later attain general officer rank, such as Julian Robert Lindsey, Tracy Campbell Dickson, Frank W. Coe, William Ruthven Smith, James Ancil Shipton, Louis Chapin Covell, Preston Brown, George Blakely, Robert Mearns, Peter Weimer Davison, Howard Russell Hickok, Henry Howard Whitney, John E. Woodward, John McAuley Palmer and George Columbus Barnhardt.

== Early career ==
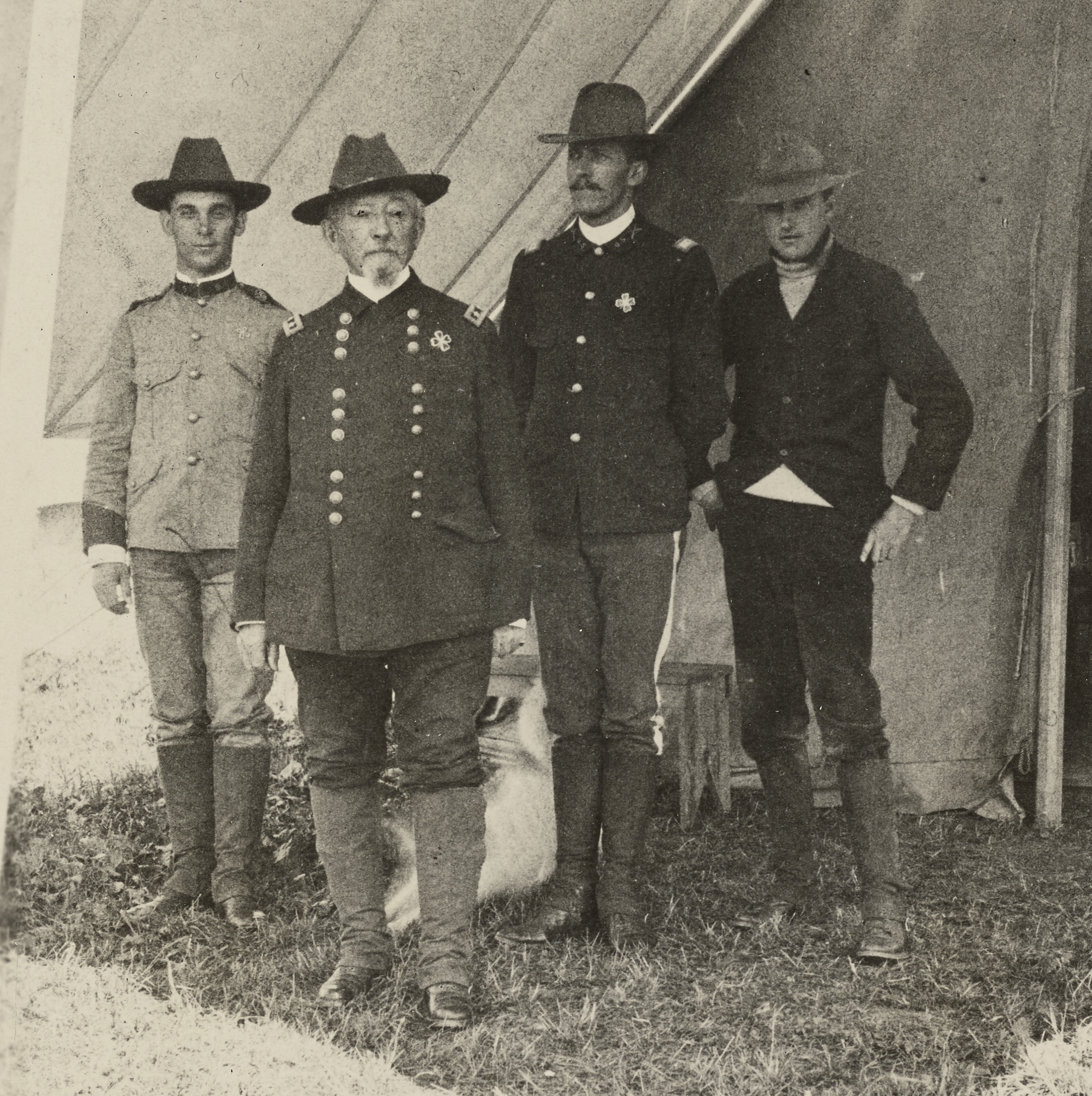
Summerall (far left) on the staff of Major General William M. Graham c. 1898

Commissioned as a second lieutenant, Summerall was assigned to the 1st Infantry Regiment, transferring to the 5th Artillery Regiment in March 1893. He performed garrison duty in California from 1893 to 1895, then served at Fort Hamilton, New York from 1895 to 1898. During the Spanish–American War, he was assigned to the Department of the Gulf as aide to the commander, Major General William Montrose Graham, and as an engineer officer in 1898 to 1899, receiving promotion to first lieutenant in March 1899.

Summerall participated with his unit in the Philippine Insurrection in 1899 to 1900, and was a member of the China Relief Expedition in 1900 to 1901, participating in the attack on Peking. He was promoted to captain and assigned to the 106th Coast Artillery Company in July 1901. He served at Forts Walla Walla and Lawton, in Washington state, commanding the latter post in 1901 to 1902. He was on duty at Camp Skagway and was in charge of preliminary work at Fort Seward in Alaska. He commanded Fort Flagler in 1902 to 1903, and then was transferred to the 3rd Field Artillery Battery with duty at Camp Thomas and Fort Myer in 1903 to 1905.

Summerall was the senior instructor of artillery tactics at West Point from 1905 to 1911. He was promoted to major in March 1911, and commanded the field artillery of the Maneuver Division at San Antonio, Texas. He commanded the summer camps of instruction for army and National Guard artillery in 1912 to 1914, was assistant chief of the Militia Bureau and in charge of National Guard artillery in 1915 to 1917. He was engaged in purchasing artillery ranges, and was a member of the Ordnance Board from 1915 to 1916, the commission to investigate the manufacture of munitions in 1916, the Board of Ordnance and Fortification in 1917, and the military mission to British and French armies in 1917. He was promoted to lieutenant colonel in 1916, colonel in 1917, and brigadier general in the National Army in August 1917.

== World War I ==
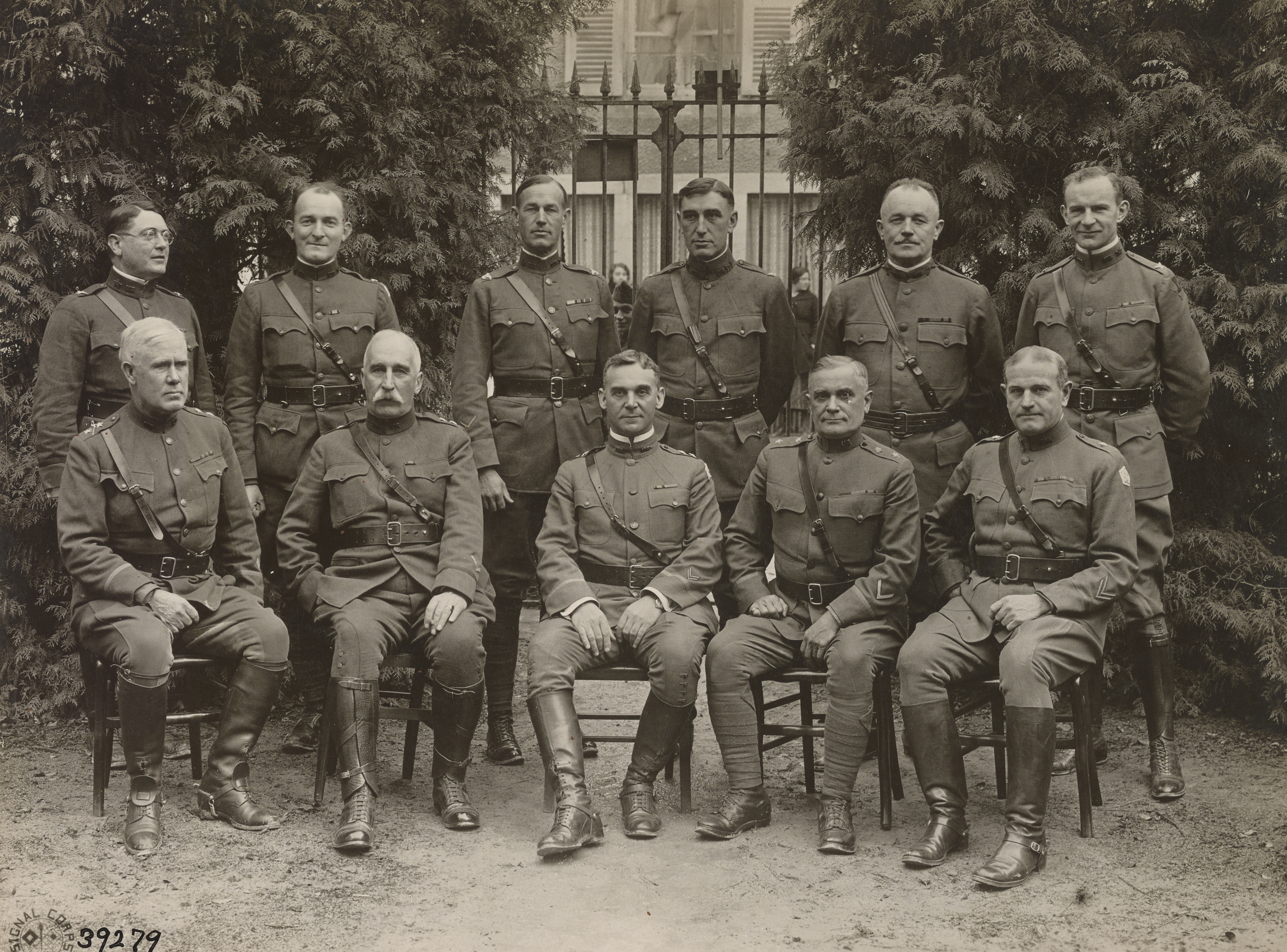
Major General Charles Pelot Summerall, sat in the middle, along with members of his staff and senior commanders in his V Corps, pictured here in 1918 or 1919.

Summerall commanded the 67th Field Artillery Brigade and the 1st Field Artillery Brigade in operations in France in 1917, was promoted to major general in the National Army, and successively commanded his brigade, the 1st Division, and V Corps, in the Cantigny, Soissons, St. Mihiel, and Meuse-Argonne operations in 1918. "Late on November 9th, instructions from the Allied Commander-In-Chief were transmitted by G.H.Q., A.E.F., directing a general attack, which was executed by the First Army on November 10th–11th. Crossings of the Meuse were secured by General Summerall's (V) Corps during the night of November 10th–11th and the remainder of the army advanced on the whole front." Summerall's actions on November 10–11 resulted in over eleven hundred American casualties. Some have criticized the allied operations in the final days of the war, including those ordered by Summerall, as causing unnecessary loss of life, but they are more understandable in the context of previous failed peace attempts and rumors. Marshal Ferdinand Foch, the Allied Supreme Commander, warned General John Joseph "Blackjack" Pershing, Commander-in-Chief of the American Expeditionary Forces (AEF) on the Western Front, on November 5: "It can happen that the enemy may spread rumors that an armistice is signed in order to deceive us. There is none. Let no one cease hostilities of any sort without information from the Marshal, Commander-In-Chief."

According to historian Niall Ferguson, Major General Summerall was equally capable of issuing orders that violated the laws and customs of war, as when he ordered U.S. Marine Corps officer Elton Mackin, "Way up there to the north is a railhead... Go cut it for me. And when you cut it, you will go hungry if you try to feed the prisoners you will take... Now I say, and you remember me on this, on those three ridges, take no prisoners."

Later, Summerall commanded IX and IV Corps and served on the American Peace Commission at the Peace Conference in 1919.

== Leadership and character ==
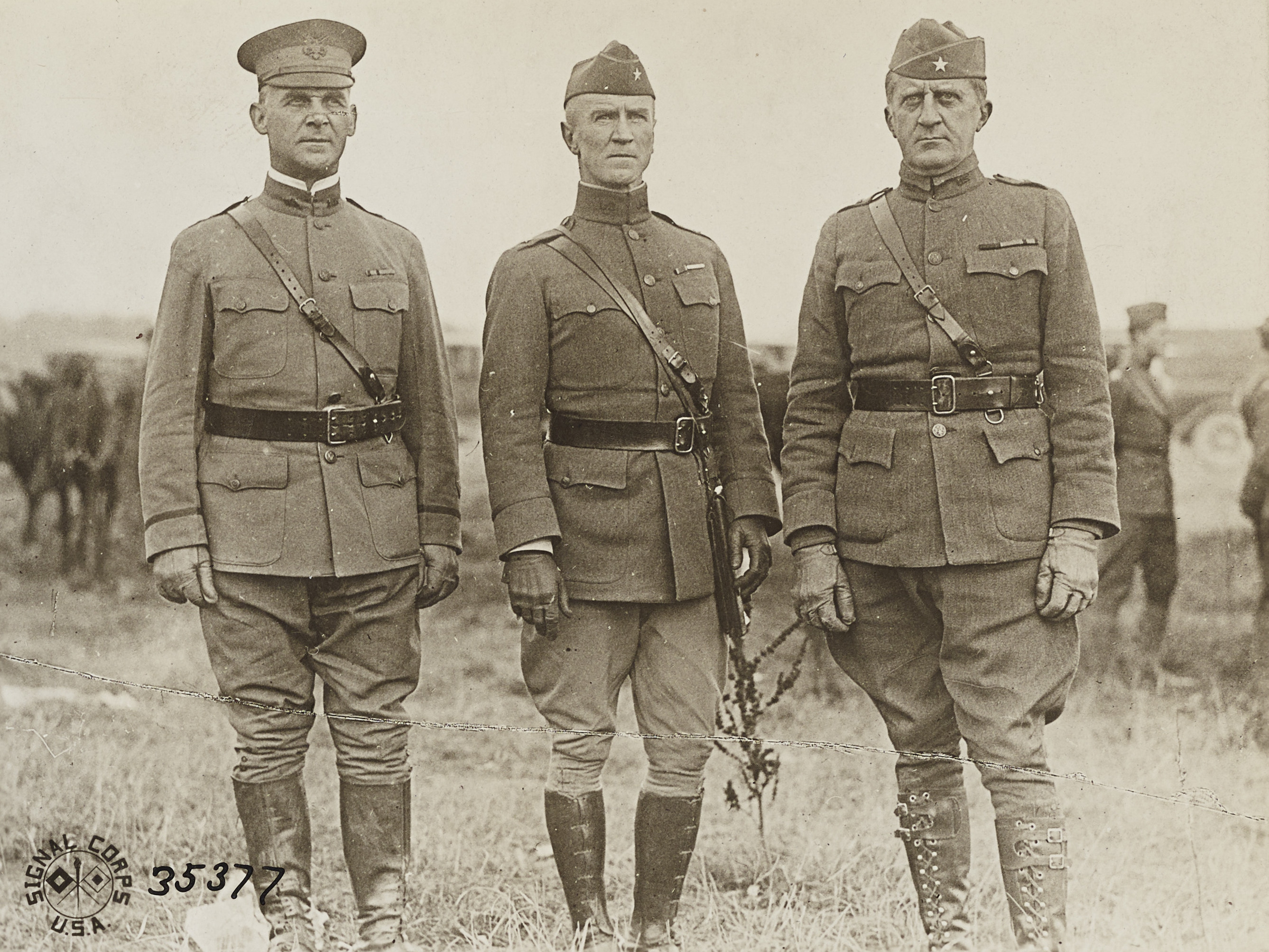
From left to right: Major General Charles P. Summerall, commanding V Corps, Brigadier General Frank Parker, commanding the 1st Division, Brigadier General Francis C. Marshall, commanding the 2nd Brigade, 1st Division, France, October 31, 1918.

General John J. Pershing, in a hand-written dedication to the official Report of the First Army, wrote in 1924: "To Major General Charles P. Summerall, whose loyal and distinguished services as Brigade, Division, and Corps Commander during Allied operations of the American Expedition army forces in the World War will ever remain the pride of his associates and will ever mark him as one of the outstanding figures of that great struggle. Especially will his name be linked with the wonderful achievements of the First Division which exemplifies his character as a soldier and a leader."

Brigadier General Theodore Roosevelt Jr. wrote in a letter to future Army Chief of Staff George C. Marshall: "in my humble opinion, General Summerall was the biggest troop leader we had in the American army and you were the best tactician. I have quite often expressed this view to people whom I know and you would be pleased and surprised to know how many agree with me." General Thomas T. Handy, discussing the impact of "real leaders", said "I remember old man Summerall, 5th Corps, way back in World War I. His personality was felt all the way down through it."

War correspondent Thomas Johnson wrote: "To command the V Corps in the place of General Cameron, came the epitome of a military leader, daring and careful, ruthless and inspiring, a Christian and a fighter, whose officers and men worshipped him, Major-General Charles P. Summerall of the 1st Division." He later observes "Summerall was spiritually a Civil war corps commander, mentally a scientific modern soldier, a twentieth-century Stonewall Jackson. He could deliver an exhortation to make men cry and curse and beg to get at the Germans."

In World War I, Summerall became embittered by General Joseph T. Dickman. During an attempted attack on Sedan in early November 1918, based on misleading orders by General Pershing, Summerall failed to coordinate with Dickman's I Corps and ordered his subordinate, Brigadier General Frank Parker, who had succeeded him in command of the 1st Division, to attack the city. During the attack, Parker's 1st Division entered Dickman's sector and mixed with two of his divisions and a French unit, causing confusion, delays and friendly fire incidents. Although the episode had no relevant military consequences, Gary Nichols reports, that even after Summerall became chief of staff, he attributed all criticism or resistance he encountered to supporters of Dickman, so "it became almost impossible to criticize him without incurring his wrath."

== Post-war career ==
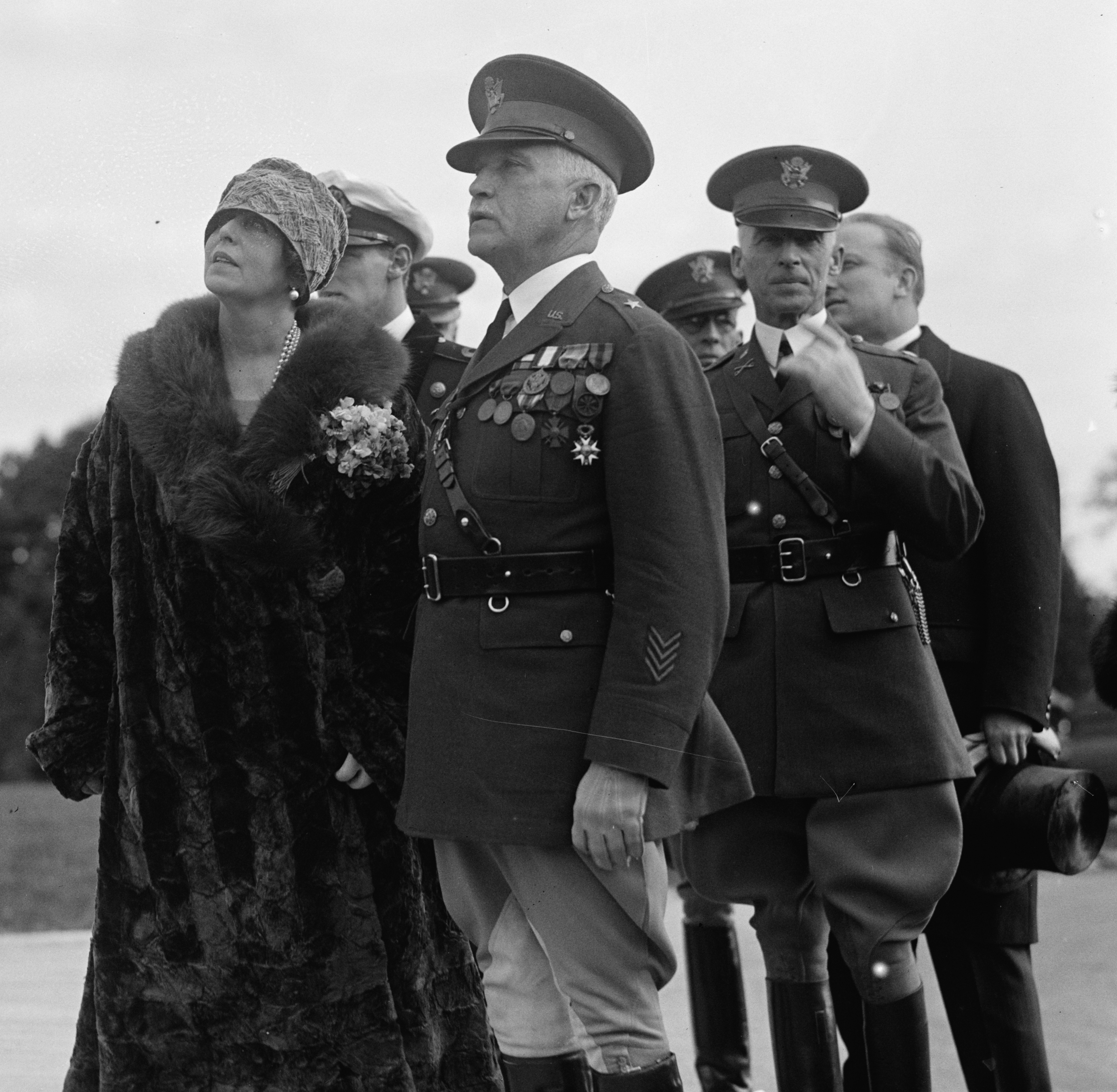
General Charles P. Summerall with Queen Marie of Romania on October `9, 1926.

Summerall commanded the 1st Division in 1919 to 1921, receiving promotion to brigadier general of the regular army in February 1919 and to major general in April 1920. He commanded the Hawaiian Department from August 1921 to August 1924. Colonel William "Billy" Mitchell visited Summerall during his command in Hawaii, and criticized the lack of air defenses for the islands. This angered Summerall, who attempted to preside over Mitchell's 1925 court-martial. Summerall testified against Mitchell, who was convicted and sentenced to a five-year suspension from duty.

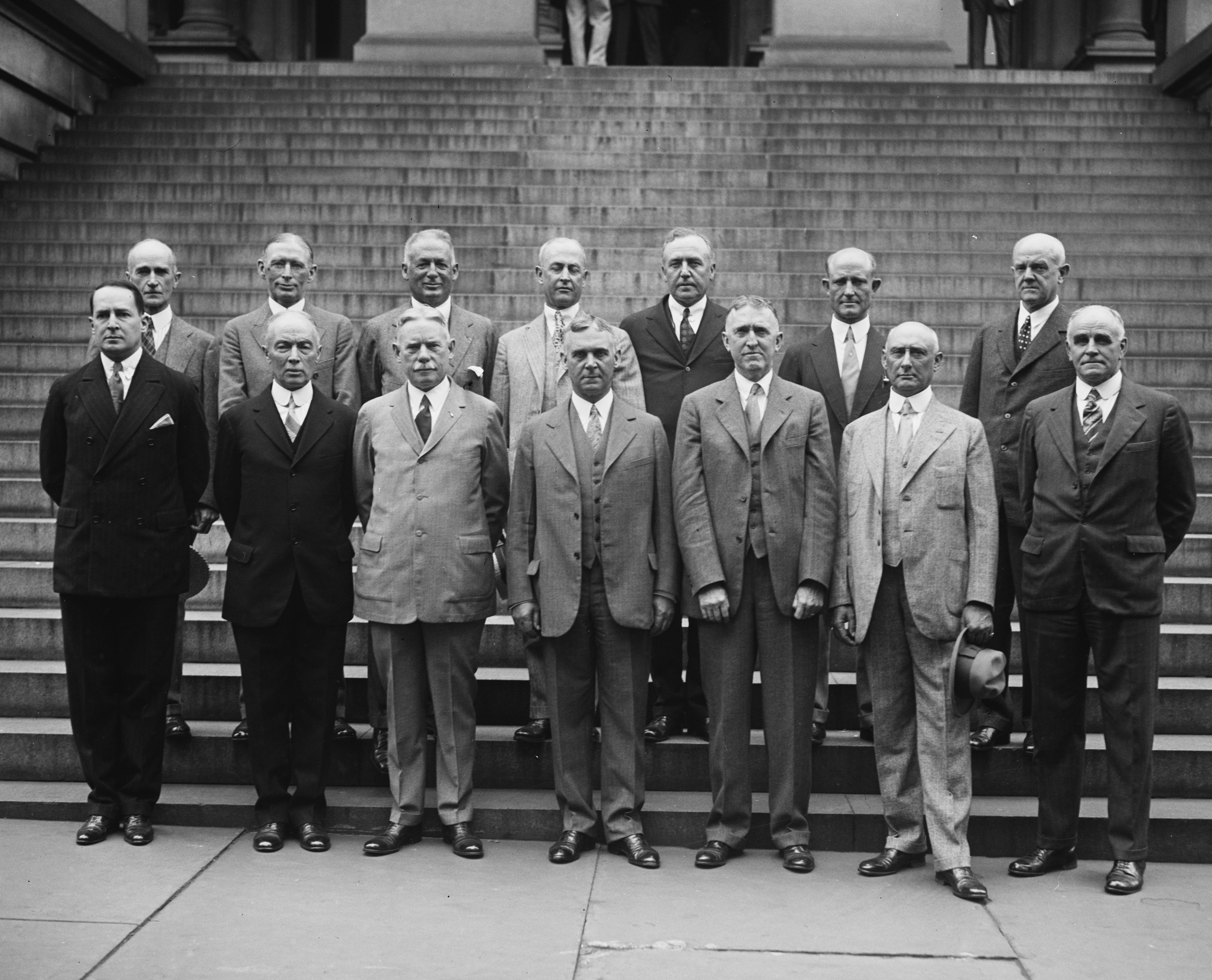
Corps area commanders and division commanders meet with the army chief of staff, Major General Charles P. Summerall, at the War Department, May 1927.

After commanding the Eighth and Second Corps Areas from 1924 to 1926, Summerall was appointed Chief of Staff of the United States Army. He served from 21 November 1926 until 20 November 1930, and was promoted to general in February 1929. During his tenure he directed the formation of a mechanized force and recommended an integrated mobile force of tank, artillery, engineer, and quartermaster elements. In 1927, Summerall joined the South Carolina Society of the Sons of the American Revolution, and he later became its president.

Summerall retired from active service in March 1931, and was president of The Citadel from 1931 until 1953. He died in Washington, D.C., on 14 May 1955. Summerall is buried in Arlington National Cemetery.

The elite rifle drill team at The Citadel is named The Summerall Guards in his honor. The Citadel's parade field, edged by the cadet barracks and most of the main buildings on campus, is named after him. The Summerall Chapel on the campus of The Citadel, built in 1936, is named for Summerall as well. Summerall Field is the main parade ground on Fort Myer, Virginia, where change of command ceremonies, retirements, the twilight tattoo and other major events are held featuring the 3d Infantry Regiment.

== Awards ==
General Summerall's military awards include the following –

- Distinguished Service Cross
- Distinguished Service Medal
- Silver Star with three oak leaf clusters
- Spanish War Service Medal
- China Campaign Medal
- Philippine Campaign Medal
- Mexican Border Service Medal
- Victory Medal
- Grand Cordon, Order of Polonia Restituta (Poland)
- Grand Officer, Order of the Crown of Belgium
- Grand Officer, Order of Prince Danilo I (Montenegro)
- Commander, Legion of Honor (France)
- Commander, Order of the Crown of Italy
- Order of Military Merit of Cuba
- Croix de Guerre (France) with two Palms
- Military Medal of the Second Class, Republic of Panama

=== Citations ===
Summerall's received the Distinguished Service Cross as commanding general of the 1st Division. The citation for the award reads:

...for extraordinary heroism in action before Berzy-le-Sec, near Soissons, France, during the Aisne-Marne offensive, July 19, 1918. General Summerall, commanding the 1st Division, visited, with great gallantry and with utter disregard for his own safety, the extreme front lines of his division and personally made a reconnaissance of the position in the face of heavy hostile machine-gun and artillery fire, exhorting his men to renew the attack on Berzy-le-Sec, promising them a powerful artillery support, and so encouraging them by his presence and example that they declared their readiness to take the town for him. Due to his great courage and utter disregard for his own safety, the men of his division were inspired to enormous and heroic efforts, capturing Berzy-le-Sec the next morning under terrific enemy fire, and later in the day the division reached all its objectives.

In contrast to the official citation, Colonel Conrad S. Babcock, commander of the 28th Infantry Regiment at Berzy-le-Sec, contended that Summerall was not at the front until after the battle.

The only time I saw General Summerall near the front was on the night of the 19th in the Missy-aux-Bois ravine, Ploisy had just been captured. If he exhorted any of the 1st Battalion that evening, after their strenuous and fierce 3,000 yard advance, I was never told of it.

The citation for Summerall's Distinguished Service Medal is as follows:

War Department, General Order No. 12 (1919) The President of the United States of America, authorized by Act of Congress, July 9, 1918, takes pleasure in presenting the Army Distinguished Service Medal to Major General Charles Pelot Summerall Sr., United States Army, for exceptionally meritorious and distinguished services to the Government of the United States, in a duty of great responsibility during World War I. General Summerall Commanded in turn a Brigade of the 1st Division in the operations near Montdidier, the 1st Division during the Soissons and St. Mihiel offensives and in the early battles of the Meuse-Argonne advance, and the 5th Army Corps in the latter battles of this advance. In all of these important duties his calm courage, his clear judgment, and his soldierly character had a marked influence in the attainment of the successes of his commands.

== Dates of rank ==
No pin insignia in 1892	Second lieutenant, Regular Army: June 11, 1892
	First lieutenant, Regular Army: March 2, 1899
	Captain, Regular Army: July 1, 1901
	Major, Regular Army: March 11, 1911
	Lieutenant colonel, Regular Army: July 1, 1916
	Colonel, Regular Army: May 15, 1917
	Brigadier general, National Army: August 5, 1917
	Major general, National Army: May 26, 1918
	Brigadier general, Regular Army: February 16, 1919
	Major general, Regular Army: April 5, 1920
	General, Temporary: February 23, 1929
	Major general, Regular Army: November 20, 1930
	General, Retired list: March 31, 1931

== See also ==
- The Summerall Guards

== Bibliography ==
- Davis, Henry Blaine Jr. (1998). Generals in Khaki. Raleigh, NC: Pentland Press. ISBN 1571970886. OCLC 40298151.
- Zabecki, David T.; Mastriano, Douglas V., eds. (2020). Pershing's Lieutenants: American Military Leadership in World War I. New York, NY: Osprey Publishing. ISBN 978-1-4728-3863-6.
- Charles Pelot Summerall (2010). Timothy K. Nenninger (ed.). The way of duty, honor, country : the memoir of General Charles Pelot Summerall. Lexington, Ky.: University Press of Kentucky. p. 298. ISBN 9780813126180.
- Cooke, James J. (1997). Pershing and his Generals: Command and Staff in the AEF. Praeger Publishers. ISBN 0-275-95363-7.
- Venzon, Anne Cipriano (2013). The United States in the First World War: an Encyclopedia. Hoboken, NJ: Taylor and Francis. ISBN 978-1-135-68453-2. OCLC 865332376.
- Lengel, Edward G. (2008). To Conquer Hell: The Meuse-Argonne 1918. Henry Holt and Company, 2008. ISBN 978-0-8050-7931-9.
- Persico, Joseph E. (2004). Eleventh Month, Eleventh Day, Eleventh Hour: Armistice Day, 1918, World War I and Its Violent Climax. Random House, 2004. ISBN 9780375508257.

Military offices
Preceded by Robert Lee Bullard	Commanding General 1st Division; July–October 1918	Succeeded by Frank Parker
Preceded by Edward McGlachlin Jr.	Commanding General 1st Division; 1919−1921	Succeeded by David C. Shanks
Preceded by George H. Cameron	Commanding General V Corps; 1918−1919	Succeeded by George W. Read
Preceded by Charles G. Morton	Commanding General Hawaiian Department; 1921−1924	Succeeded by Charles T. Menoher
Preceded by John L. Hines	Chief of Staff of the United States Army; 1926–1930	Succeeded by Douglas MacArthur
