= Summerall =

Summerall is a surname. Notable people with the surname include:

- Charles Pelot Summerall (1867–1955), United States Army general
  - The Summerall Guards
- Pat Summerall (1930–2013), American football player and sports announcer
- Susie Wiles (née Summerall, born 1957), American political consultant
