= John McAuley Palmer =

John McAuley Palmer may refer to:

- John M. Palmer (politician) (1817–1900), American politician, governor of Illinois
- John McAuley Palmer (general) (1870–1955), his grandson
