= General Chamberlain =

General Chamberlain may refer to:

- Crawford Chamberlain (1821–1902), British Indian Army general
- John Loomis Chamberlain (1858–1948), U.S. Army major general
- Joshua Chamberlain (1828–1914), Union Army brigadier general and brevet major general
- Neville Bowles Chamberlain (1820–1902), British Indian Army general
- Paul A. Chamberlain (fl. 2010s–2020s), U.S. Army major general

== See also ==
- William Chamberlaine (1871–1925), U.S. Army brigadier general
- Harry Chamberlin (1887–1944), U.S. Army brigadier general
- Stephen J. Chamberlin (1889–1971), U.S. Army lieutenant general
- Attorney General Chamberlain (disambiguation)
