= Frank Coe =

Frank Coe may refer to:

- Frank Coe (government official), United States government official alleged to be a Soviet spy
- Frank Coe (Lincoln County War), Old West cowboy, gunman, and member of the Lincoln County Regulators
- Frank W. Coe, United States Army general
