= Henry W. Closson =

US Army brigadier general

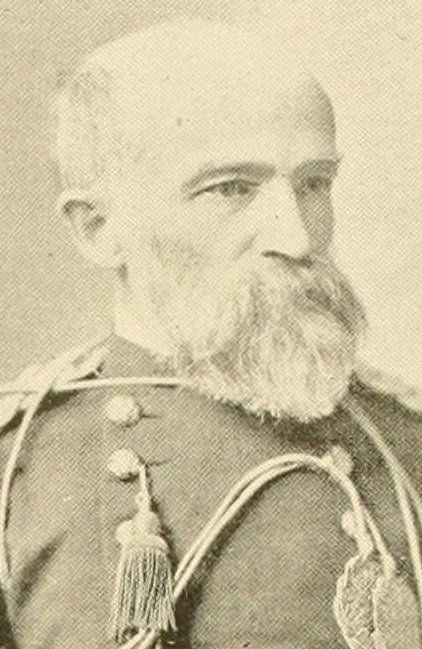
- Closson in uniform, c. 1892
- Born: June 6, 1832; Whitingham, Vermont, U.S.
- Died: July 15, 1917 (aged 85); Washington, D.C.
- Burial place: Arlington National Cemetery
- Spouse(s): Olivia Adelaide Burke (m. 1857–1866, her death); Julia Woodbridge Terry (m. 1868–1917, his death)
- Children: 4
- Relatives: Henry Howard Whitney (son in law); William L. Kenly (son in law)
- Military career
- Allegiance: United States
- Branch: United States Army; Union Army
- Service years: 1854–1861, 1865–1896 (U.S. Army); 1861–1866 (Union Army)
- Rank: Colonel (Army); Brigadier General (Retired list)
- Unit: U.S. Army Field Artillery Branch
- Commands: Chief of Artillery, District of Pensacola; Battery of Baton Rouge, Louisiana; Chief of Artillery, 4th Division, XIX Corps; Chief of Artillery, XIX Corps; Chief of Artillery and Cavalry Ordnance, Middle Military Division; Battery of Winchester, Virginia; Fort Barrancas, Florida; Little Rock Barracks, Arkansas; Fort Niagara, New York; Fort Wadsworth, New York; 4th Field Artillery Regiment; Fort Adams, Rhode Island
- Conflicts: American Indian Wars; American Civil War

Henry W. Closson (June 6, 1832 – July 15, 1917) was a career officer in the United States Army. A veteran of the American Indian Wars and the American Civil War, he served from 1854 to 1896 and attained the rank of colonel. During the Civil War, Closson received brevet promotions to major and lieutenant colonel to recognize his heroism during the Siege of Port Hudson, Louisiana and Siege of Fort Morgan, Alabama.

In retirement, Closson was a resident of Washington, D.C., In July 1904, he was promoted to brigadier general in accordance with a newly passed law which permitted Union Army veterans of the Civil War who had retired from the regular army at a rank lower than brigadier general to be advanced one grade on the Army's retired list. He died in Washington, D.C., on July 15, 1917, and was buried at Arlington National Cemetery.

== Early life ==
Henry Whitney Closson was born in Whitingham, Vermont, on June 6, 1832, the son of Henry and Emily (Whitney) Closson. He was raised and educated in Springfield, Vermont, where his father was a prominent attorney and judge.

In 1850, Closson began attendance at the United States Military Academy. He graduated in 1854 ranked eighth of 46. His classmates included several individuals who attained prominence during the American Civil War and the years that followed, including George Washington Custis Lee, Thomas H. Ruger, Oliver Otis Howard, J. E. B. Stuart, and Zenas Bliss. Closson was commissioned as a second lieutenant of Field Artillery.

== Start of career ==
Closson was initially assigned to the 1st Artillery Regiment and performed frontier duty at Fort Yuma, California, from 1854 to 1855. In 1855 and 1856 he accompanied Army officer Nathaniel Michler during Michler's survey of the Mexico–United States border. In 1856, Closson was posted to Fort Clark, Texas, where he took part in scouting and pursuit of several bands of Lipan Indians as part of the effort to force their settlement on the Brazos Indian Reservation. He was promoted to first lieutenant in October 1856.

After performing garrison duty at Baton Rouge Barracks, Louisiana at the end of 1856, in 1857 Closson was assigned to duty in Florida, where he took part in the Third Seminole War. He was assigned to duty at Fort Adams, Rhode Island from 1857 to 1859. From 1859 to 1860 he was again on duty at Fort Clark, Texas. From 1860 to 1861 he served at Fort Duncan, Texas, and in early 1861 he performed duty at Fort Taylor, Florida.

== American Civil War ==
In May 1861, Closson declined promotion to captain in the 19th Infantry to accept it in the 1st Artillery. He took part in the defense of Fort Pickens, Florida from May 1861 to May 1862, including response to Confederate attacks on November 22 and 23, 1861, January 1, 1862, and May 8, 1862. From May to December 1862 Closson was chief of artillery for the District of Pensacola. He commanded the Battery of Baton Rouge, Louisiana from December 1862 to March 1863. From March to August 1863, Closson took part in the Department of the Gulf's Bayou Teche campaign as commander of artillery for 4th Division, XIX Corps, including the skirmish at Grand Lake Landing on April 13, 1863, Battle of Irish Bend on April 14, 1863, Battle of Vermilion Bayou on April 17, 1863, and Siege of Port Hudson from May 24 to July 8, 1863, to include assaults on May 29 and June 14. Closson received promotion to brevet major to date from July 8, 1863, in recognition of his gallant conduct during the capture of Port Hudson.

After a leave of absence, Closson served as XIX Corps chief of artillery from October 1863 to July 1864. He took part in the Red River campaign of March to May 1864, including the Battle of Mansfield on April 8, 1864, Battle of Pleasant Hill on April 9, 1864, and Battle of Monett's Ferry on April 23, 1864.

Closson was corps chief of artillery in the Battle of Mobile Bay, Alabama of August 1864, including the Siege of Fort Gaines from August 4 to 7 and Siege of Fort Morgan from August 10 to 23. He was promoted to brevet lieutenant colonel to date from August 23 in recognition of his meritorious and gallant conduct at Fort Morgan.

After another leave of absence, Closson served as chief of artillery and cavalry ordnance for the Middle Military Division from November 1 to December 31, 1864. From January to April 1865 he was inspector of the Horse Artillery Brigade, and he commanded a battery in Winchester, Virginia from April to July 1865.

== Post-Civil War ==
Following the conclusion of the Civil War, Closson served in artillery assignments at Fort McHenry, Maryland from July to October 1865, Fort Schuyler, New York from October 1865 to June 1866, and Fort Porter, New York from July to August 1866.

Closson served on recruiting duty at various posts from August 1866 to January 1868. He served at Fort Hamilton, New York from January 1868 to November 1872. His subsequent assignments included Savannah, Georgia from November 1872 to December 1875, Plattsburgh Barracks, New York from December 1875 to October 1876, and Edgefield, South Carolina, from October to November 1876, during the Red Shirt Campaign. On November 1, 1876, Closson was promoted to major in the 5th Artillery.

From December 1876 to January 1877, Closson served at Plattsburgh Barracks. He was posted to Fort Barrancas, Florida from January 1877 to June 1879. After a leave of absence, from October 1879 to June 1880, Closson commanded the post at Fort Barrancas. He was in command at Little Rock Barracks, Arkansas from June to November 1880, Fort Barrancas from November 1880 to November 1881, and Fort Niagara, New York from November 1881 to September 1882.

From September 1882 to June 1888, Closson commanded Fort Wadsworth, New York, and he was promoted to lieutenant colonel on September 14, 1883. In April 1888, Closson was promoted to colonel as commander of the 4th Artillery, and he commanded the regiment and the post at Fort Adams, Rhode Island from June 1888 to May 1889. From 1888 to 1893, Closson performed additional duty as a member of the Army's Board of Ordnance and Fortifications.

== Later career ==
Closson continued in command of the 4th Artillery at Fort McPherson, Georgia from 1889 to 1893, and Washington Barracks in Washington, D.C., from 1893 to 1896. From 1890 to 1891 he performed additional duty as a member of the Army's Board on Gun Factories and Steel Forgings for High Power Guns. In addition, he served as a member of the board of visitors for the artillery school at Fort Monroe, Virginia.

== Career as author ==
Closson authored numerous articles for professional journals and other publications during his career and in retirement. A partial list includes:

"McDowell and Tyler at Bull Run". The United Service. Philadelphia, PA: L. R. Hamersly. January 1885. p. 9 – via Google Books.
"Chronicles of Carter Barracks". The United Service. Philadelphia, PA: L. R. Hamersly. August 1892. p. 125 – via Google Books.
"A Paper On Military Libraries". Journal of the Military Service Institution of the United States. New York, NY: Military Service Institution. May 1895. p. 457 – via Google Books.
King, Charles, ed. (1895). "The Colonel's Story". The Colonel's Christmas Dinner and Other Stories. Philadelphia, PA: J. B. Lippincott Company. p. 156 – via Google Books.
"Beyond and Back Again". The United Service. Philadelphia, PA: L. R. Hamersly. December 1904. p. 715 – via Google Books.

== Retirement and death ==
In June 1896, Closson left the Army because he had reached the mandatory retirement age of 64. In retirement, he resided in Washington, D.C. In April 1904, Congress enacted a law permitting Union Army officers who had retired from the regular army at a rank lower than brigadier general to be advanced one grade on the Army's retired list. Closson qualified under these criteria, and was advanced to brigadier general with an effective date of April 4, 1904.

Closson was a member of the Military Order of the Loyal Legion of the United States. He died in Washington on July 15, 1917, and was buried at Arlington National Cemetery.

== Legacy ==
Battery Closson, an artillery position that was part of the defenses of Pearl Harbor, Hawaii in the early to mid 1900s, was named for Closson. Closson was fluent in Latin, Greek, and Hebrew, and collected more than 10,000 books, including rare volumes and first editions. After his death, his library was sold at auction in several lots by Walpole Galleries of New York City.

== Family ==
In October 1857, Closson married Olivia Adelaide Burke (1835–1866). They were the parents of two children, Henry and Olivia. In 1868, Closson married Julia Woodbridge Terry, a cousin of Major General Alfred Terry. They were the parents of two daughters, Julie and Ellen.

Closson's daughter Ellen was the wife of Brigadier General Henry Howard Whitney. His daughter Julie was the wife of Major General William L. Kenly.
