= Attorney General Chamberlain =

Attorney General Chamberlain may refer to:

- Daniel Henry Chamberlain (1835–1907), Attorney General of South Carolina
- George Earle Chamberlain (1854–1928), Attorney General of Oregon

== See also ==
- General Chamberlain (disambiguation)
