= Franklin Guest Smith =

Frank G. Smith
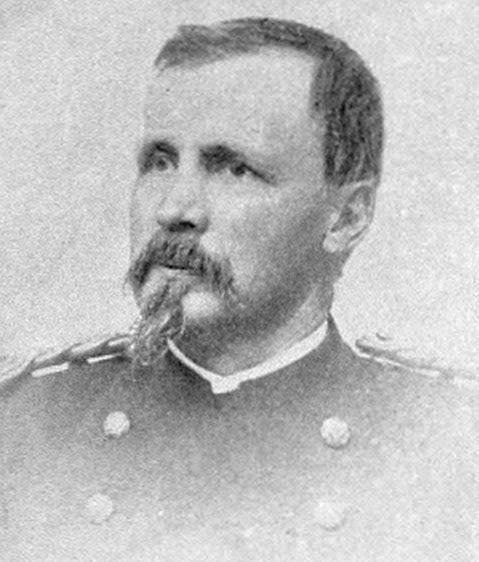
- From 1892's Officers of the Army and Navy (Regular) Who Served in the Civil War
- Born: Franklin Guest Smith; February 16, 1840; Blossburg, Pennsylvania, U.S.
- Died: October 7, 1912 (aged 72); Washington, D.C.
- Burial place: Arlington National Cemetery
- Education: Rensselaer Polytechnic Institute
- Spouse(s): Frances Louisa Dauchy (m. 1866–1878, her death); Georgiana Dauchy (m. 1881–1912, his death)
- Children: 4
- Relatives: William Chamberlaine (son in law)
- Military career
- Allegiance: Union; United States
- Branch: Union Army (1861–1865); United States Army (1865–1903)
- Service years: 1861–1903
- Rank: Brigadier General
- Unit: U.S. Army Field Artillery Branch
- Commands: Battery I, 4th Artillery Regiment; Battery F, 4th Artillery Regiment; Artillery Siege Train, Fort Tampa, Florida; Artillery District of Portland, Maine
- Conflicts: American Civil War; American Indian Wars; Spanish–American War
- Other work: Secretary and member, Chickamauga and Chattanooga National Military Park Commission

Franklin Guest Smith (February 16, 1840 – October 7, 1912) was a career officer in the United States Army. A Union Army veteran of the American Civil War, Smith also served in the American Indian Wars and the Spanish–American War, and attained the rank of brigadier general.

A native of Blossburg, Pennsylvania, Smith studied civil engineering at Rensselaer Polytechnic Institute, from which he graduated in 1859. After briefly working as private secretary for George B. McClellan, an executive with the Illinois Central Railroad and Ohio and Mississippi Railway, at the start of the American Civil War Smith followed McClellan into the Union Army and obtained a commission as a second lieutenant of Field Artillery. Smith served with the 4th Artillery Regiment, part of the Union's Army of the Cumberland. He commanded the 4th Artillery's Battery I, and took part in the Battle of Chickamauga and other engagements.

After the war, Smith continued to serve in the United States Army, including participation in the American Indian Wars and coastal artillery assignments on both the Atlantic and Pacific coasts. He was the longtime commander of Battery F, 4th Artillery, and in the 1890s began a long tenure as secretary and member of the Chickamauga and Chattanooga National Military Park Commission. During the Spanish–American War, Smith was assigned as artillery inspector for the army's Department of the South, then commanded a siege train of artillery at Fort Tampa, Florida, which was inactivated after the end of the war eliminated the need for Smith's command to deploy to Cuba.

After the war, Smith commanded the Artillery District of Portland, Maine. On August 3, 1903, Smith was promoted to brigadier general, and he retired on August 4. In retirement, Smith resided in Washington, D.C. He died in Washington on October 7, 1912, and was buried at Arlington National Cemetery.

== Early life ==
Franklin G. Smith (often referred to as Frank Guest Smith or Frank G. Smith) was born near Blossburg, Pennsylvania, on February 16, 1840, the son of Dr. Franklin Rushton and Mary (Guest) Smith. he attended the local schools, and was graduate of Bellefonte Academy. In 1859, he graduated from Rensselaer Polytechnic Institute with a degree in civil engineering. While in college, Smith became a member of the Theta Delta Chi fraternity. After graduating, he began a career in railroad management as private secretary to George B. McClellan, who was then serving as vice president of the Illinois Central Railroad and president of the Ohio and Mississippi Railway.

== Civil War ==
When McClellan was commissioned a major general in the Union Army at the start of the American Civil War, Smith continued to serve as his secretary. In August 1861, Smith received a commission as a second lieutenant in the 4th Artillery Regiment. He continued to serve with the 4th Artillery, primarily as commander of Battery I during the regiment's assignment to the Army of the Cumberland, and took part in the fight at Snodgrass Hill during the Battle of Chickamauga. During the war, Smith received brevet promotions to captain (December 31, 1862) and major (September 20, 1863) as commendations for his superior service.

== Continued career ==
Smith continued his army service after the Civil War, primarily in the western United States. This service included American Indian Wars campaigns against the Cheyenne, Sioux, Bannock, and Apache peoples. He received promotion to captain in 1867 and major in 1891. Smith also served in several coastal artillery assignments, and was the longtime commander of Battery F, 4th Artillery.

From 1893 to 1908, except for his Spanish–American War service in 1898, Smith was secretary and member of the Chickamauga and Chattanooga National Military Park Commission. Smith was one of the lead planners of the Chattanooga National Cemetery, and a monument in his honor was erected there to commemorate his efforts. Smith received promotion to lieutenant colonel in 1898.

During the Spanish–American War, Smith served first as artillery inspector for the army's Department of the South. He was subsequently appointed to command a siege train of 100 cannons that was organized in Tampa, Florida, for deployment to Havana, but the war ended before Smith's command could depart for Cuba. After the war, he resumed his duties at Chickamauga and Chattanooga.

In 1901, Smith was promoted to colonel. From November 1902 until August 1903, Smith was commander of the Artillery District of Portland, Maine. On August 3, 1903, he was promoted to brigadier general as the result of a federal law permitting still-serving Civil War veterans to be advanced one grade prior to retiring. He retired from the army on August 4, but continued to serve at Chickamauga and Chattanooga. He retired from this position in 1908.

== Later life ==
Smith was a member of the Military Service Institution of the United States, Military Order of the Loyal Legion of the United States, United States Naval Institute, Army and Navy Club, and Reunion of the Society of the Army of the Cumberland. In retirement, Smith was a resident of Washington, D.C. He died in Washington on October 7, 1912. Smith was buried at Arlington National Cemetery.

== Legacy ==
In 1921, the U.S. Army constructed Battery Smith, one of several coastal artillery positions on the island of Corregidor in Manila Bay, Philippines. The site was named for Smith, and remained in operation until U.S. soldiers disabled it at the start of World War II. After the Japanese occupation of the Philippines, the Japanese required U.S. prisoners of war to strip the usable parts of Battery Smith for use in rebuilding another coastal artillery emplacement, Battery Hearn. The ruins of Battery Smith still exist and are a frequent destination for tourists and historians exploring Corregidor.

== Family ==
In 1866, Smith married Frances Louisa Dauchy (1840–1878) of Troy, New York. In 1881 Smith married Georgiana Dauchy (1841–1933), the sister of his first wife. With his first wife, Smith was the father of four children: Mary Jessie; Frances Maria; Margaret; and Charles Franklin. Margaret Smith was the wife of Brigadier General William Chamberlaine.

Smith's grandson Franklin Guest Smith (1908–2001) was a 1933 graduate of the United States Military Academy and attained the rank of brigadier general. Smith's uncle Charles Eastwick Smith served as president of the Reading Railroad. His first cousin Thomas Guilford Smith was a prominent engineer and corporate executive who was associated with the steel businesses of Andrew Carnegie.
