= The Summerall Guards =

Military drill platoon at The Citadel, South Carolina

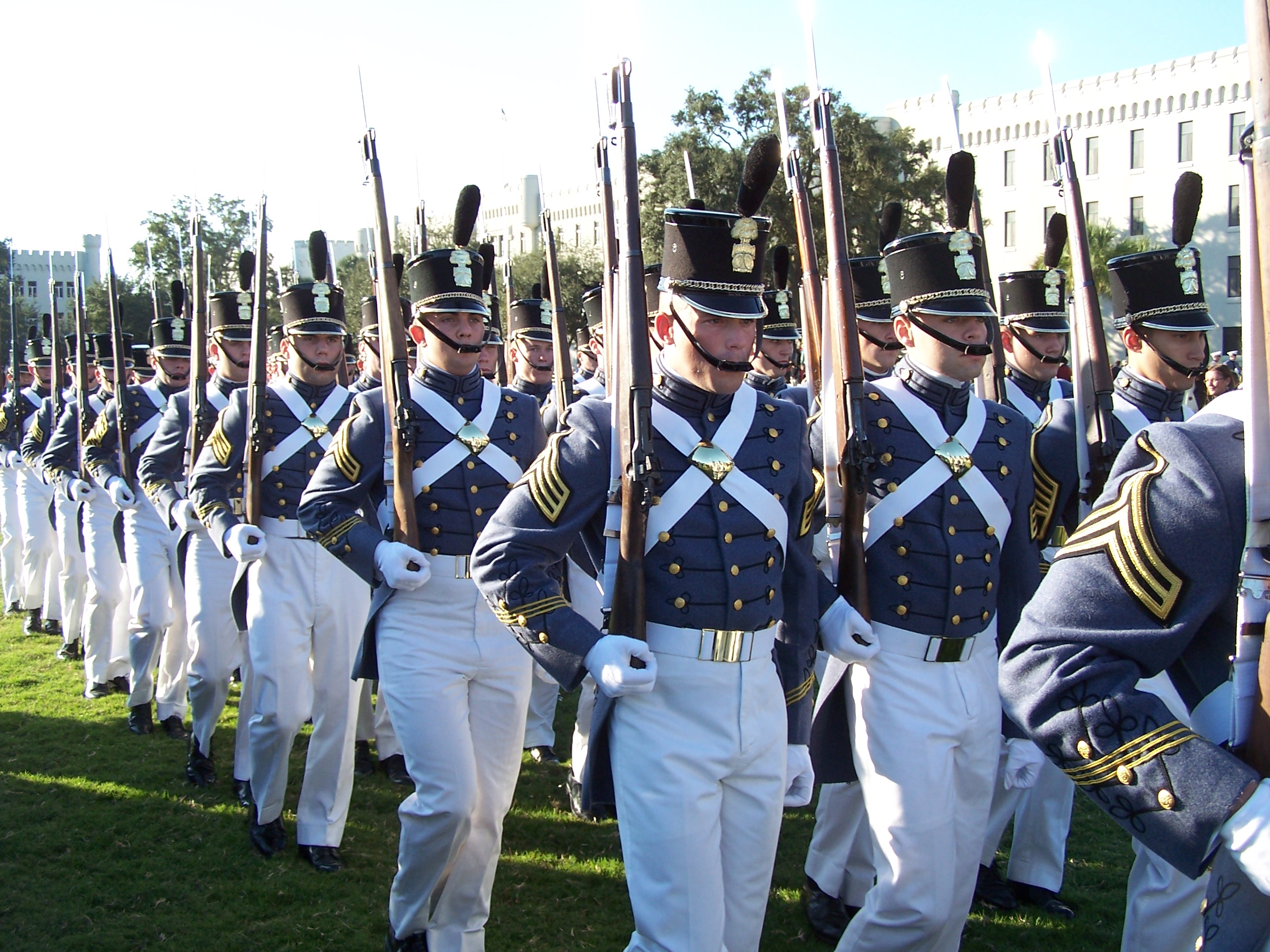
The Summerall Guards performing the Citadel Series

The Summerall Guards (previously known as the Richardson Rifles) are a military drill platoon at The Citadel, a military college in Charleston, South Carolina. The Summerall Guards were formed in 1932 and are named after General Charles P. Summerall, former chief of staff of the United States Army and president of The Citadel from 1931 to 1953.

== Unit history and background ==
Summerall Guard tradition states that their exhibition drill, known as the "Citadel Series", has remained virtually unchanged since 1932. The drill has never been written down and is passed from each class to the next. Becoming a member of the Guards is a competitive process and being selected for the Guards is considered one of the highest achievements a cadet can attain at The Citadel.

The drill steps are modeled on German close-order drill, including the Prussian Goose Step. The "Citadel Series" consists of a series of complex close-order drill movements, including the manual of arms, the German Squad Movement, the flank by flank, obliques, successive peeling movements, and varied individual squad maneuvers. The drill is silent and automatic except for an occasional "sound off" in unison by members of the group.

The Summerall Guards drill exclusively with the M1903 Springfield rifle with an attached parade chrome-plated bayonet. Other than regimental color guards, the Summerall Guards are the only unit at The Citadel to use this particular rifle. In addition to a buttstock identification number, each rifle is given both a first and middle female name. The name is carved or burned into the wooden stock of the rifle.

The unit has performed nationally at Disney World, the Cherry Blossom Festival in Washington, D.C., Mardi Gras in New Orleans, numerous National Football League sanctioned games, and St. Patrick's Day parade in Savannah, Georgia.

The Guards have been disbanded several times in its history, including the mid-1940s due to World War II and, most recently, in 1998, due to administrative changes to the Bond Volunteer Aspirant (BVA) training.

In 2017, the Summerall Guards made their fifth appearance at a presidential inaugural parade during the inauguration of Donald Trump. The Guards also participated in the inaugurations of Dwight D. Eisenhower in 1953, Ronald Reagan in 1985, George H. W. Bush in 1989, and George W. Bush in 2005.

The Guards also frequently perform on the campus grounds and can be seen free of charge by the public during major events.

Because of the COVID-19 pandemic, the 2021 Summerall Guards were selected but never performed.

== Leadership ==
Members who hold leadership positions within the Guards, depending on their position, are determined by both the Summerall Guards themselves and The Citadel's administration - by a meeting mirroring a standard military promotion board. Leadership positions are open to any member of the unit; however, only Guards who both exhibit strong leadership qualities in the larger Corps of Cadets and excel during BVA Training are usually nominated by their peers.

The Commander, First Sergeant, and Supply Sergeant are the only three positions nominated by the Guards to attend the boards held by The Citadel's administration. Usually, the Guards nominate at least two of their peers to fill each slot. However, the final decision lies with the administration. This is a fairly recent change. Prior to 2007, the Guards elected and appointed their own leadership without influence from the school.

=== Commander ===
The commander holds the overall responsibility for leading the platoon. He plans, along with guidance from the First Sergeant, performance dates, practice dates and times, and BVA Training. He is also the liaison between the platoon and The Citadel's administration. The Commander leads the Cuts Run during each day of BVA Training and is responsible for determining the desired run distance, pace and targeted attrition rate. The Commander fills the role commonly held by a platoon leader in the United States Army or platoon commander in the United States Marine Corps. He wears no cross webbing or cartridge box on his dress uniform. He wears an officer's maroon sash and feather plume in his shako. He is the only Summerall Guard who carries a sword during the performance of The Citadel Series. This is done to distinguish himself as the unit's leader.

=== First Sergeant ===
The First Sergeant is tasked with enforcing all standards and tasks given out by the Summerall Guard Commander. The First Sergeant ensures that discipline is achieved during practice and that all deadlines are met by the unit. He is the Commander's second in command and is prepared to assume command in his absence. The First Sergeant falls into the formation during performances and wears the standard dress uniform.

=== Supply Sergeant ===
The Supply Sergeant handles all logistical matters within the platoon. He is responsible for the issuing of the platoon's M1903 Springfield rifles and chrome-plated parade bayonets, as well as any other required equipment to the members. The Supply Sergeant also coordinates with the school administration to secure lodging and travel arrangements when the Guards must travel to conduct performances. He also has the additional duty of ordering uniform items for the unit. The Supply Sergeant falls into the formation during performances and wears the standard dress uniform.

=== Front guide ===
The front guide is responsible for directing the platoon's forward movement during performances and especially during marching parades. He is responsible for setting the unit's signature slow, high-step pace and is one of the tallest members of the platoon. He wears no cross webbing or cartridge box on his dress uniform. He wears an officer's maroon sash and feather plume in his shako.

=== Rear guide ===
The rear guide is the front guide's counterpart and mirrors all of his movements during a performance. He is responsible for directing the platoon's movement during certain segments of The Citadel Series and is usually one of the shortest members of the platoon. He wears no cross webbing or cartridge box on his dress uniform. He wears an officer's maroon sash and feather plume in his shako.

=== Battalion representatives ===
The battalion representatives are responsible for leading stations during BVA training, ensuring accountability of all aspirants, and generally representing their battalions. These positions are voted into their position by all aspirants in the battalion and retain the position if they are selected for the Summerall Guards. Some battalion representatives are known by a unique name, reflecting the battalion's traditions.

- Third battalion's representative is known as "the Warden".
- Fourth battalion's representative is known as "the Zookeeper".
- Fifth battalion's representative is known as "the Misfit".

== Decorations and awards ==
Three accouterments are currently authorized at The Citadel to distinguish current Summerall Guards from other cadets while wearing many of the school's various uniforms:

- The Summerall Guard Ribbon is a light-colored solid blue ribbon with a lacquered brass crossed rifle device affixed to the center of the ribbon. This award is worn in any uniform that allows the wear of Citadel awarded ribbons.
- The Circular Summerall Guard Patch or the "Guard Field Jacket Patch" - as it is commonly referred, is a circular, light blue embroidered patch worn on the left breast of The Citadel field jacket.
- The Summerall Guard Blazer Patch is an embroidered patch worn on the left breast pocket of The Citadel blazer leave uniform. The patch replaces the standard blue/black patch. The original design featured the Confederate battle flag; this design has since been discontinued and is no longer authorized for wear due to the controversy surrounding the flag. The blazer patch was redesigned in the early 2000s to include The Citadel's Big Red flag. This new design was put into production and subsequently authorized for wear by The Citadel; the older patch was phased out by the administration.
- The Clubb Award is presented each year at Corps Day to the member of the Summerall Guards voted by his peers as its most outstanding member. The award is named for Harold K. Clubb, Class of 1968, who died in a plane crash in 1971. The award is the current year's Summerall Guard field jacket patch centered on a wooden plaque with a brass plate engraved with the awarded Summerall Guard's name. The Clubb Award is usually awarded to the platoon's first sergeant as he devotes the most time ensuring the unit's success at all performances and training events.

== Uniforms ==
=== Summerall Guard uniforms ===
- Full Dress Salt and Pepper (Under Arms) is the traditional uniform worn for performances, public events, and for dress rehearsals. This uniform consists of the Full Dress wool blouse, white trousers, spit-shined leather shoes, black cotton socks, crossed webbing, cartridge box, webbed belt, shako, and white cotton parade gloves. Slight variations to this uniform are worn by the Commander, First Sergeant, Supply Sergeant, and Front/Rear Guides (see leadership section for further information).
- The Training Uniform is a less formal uniform worn by the unit during practice, formation runs, and BVA training events. This uniform consists of the black Summerall Guard PT shirt, dark blue Summerall Guard PT hooded sweatshirt (cold weather), OD green military duty pants, white socks, black and white painted Chuck Taylor All-Stars, OD green patrol cap (during BVA training and formation runs only), and webbed belt. White parade gloves are worn during drill practice only. Modifications to this uniform are made by the unit, particularly during cold weather, with additions such as black Under Armour long-sleeve shirts and The Citadel dark blue skullcap. Following a restructure of BVA training at the behest of The Citadel's administration in 2012, BVAs and Summerall Guards were disallowed to paint their "Chucks" following an order by then-Commandant of Cadets COL Leo Mercado.

=== Bond Volunteer uniforms ===
- Dress Salt and Pepper (Under Arms) is worn by Bond Volunteers only once during the changing of the Guard ceremony every year during Corps Day weekend at The Citadel. This uniform is identical to The Summerall Guard Full Dress Salt and Pepper (Under Arms) uniform, except the Bond Volunteers wear the white garrison cap and the regular dress wool blouse.

=== Bond Volunteer Aspirant uniforms ===
- BVA Training Uniform is worn during the entirety of phase two of BVA Training. It is similar to the Summerall Guard version; however, the BVA PT shirt, dark blue Citadel hooded sweatshirt (with a sewn name tag on chest), and white gloves are worn at all times.
- Cuts Day Duty Uniform is a modified version of The Citadel duty uniform. A cover, or side cap, is not worn. Also, slight changes are made based on the particular training squad a BVA belongs to. Usually, these changes lie in the collar insignia and military creases (or lack thereof), depending on the squad. This uniform is immaculately cleaned and steam pressed by each BVA. It is not uncommon for an aspirant to spend several hours preparing this one uniform for Cuts Day, as an inspection is conducted at the first Cuts Day station, and cuts are assigned for deficiencies in cleanliness and overall uniformity among the eight squad members.

== Bond Volunteer Aspirant (BVA) training ==
Each year, aspiring 2nd class cadets (Junior class) volunteer for a rigorous training and evaluation process that starts Parents' Weekend in October and goes until Corps Day in March, known as Bond Volunteer Aspirant (BVA) training. This annual training is considered the highlight of each Summerall Guard's tenure in the unit. It is their chance to choose the cadets that will replace their positions within the platoon and subsequently carry on the tradition to the next year.

== Feats ==
Once Cuts Day is complete and the rising Summerall Guards have been announced, the newly titled Bond Volunteers (BV) participate in "Feats Day". Feats Day is usually conducted the same day the former aspirants find out whether or not they have been selected to replace the current Summerall Guard class (the following morning after Cuts Day). All sixty-one BVs are invited to attend Feats Day and try out for any one feat of their choosing. This day is known for its relaxed military atmosphere. The feats center around competitions of physical prowess and strength. They range from wrestling matches, various runs and other competitions among the selected BVAs. Guards holding the old feats titles administer the competitions and regulate awarding of feats to deserving aspirants. BVAs may choose one event and the winner receives a much-coveted title.
