= Louis Chapin Covell =

United States Army general

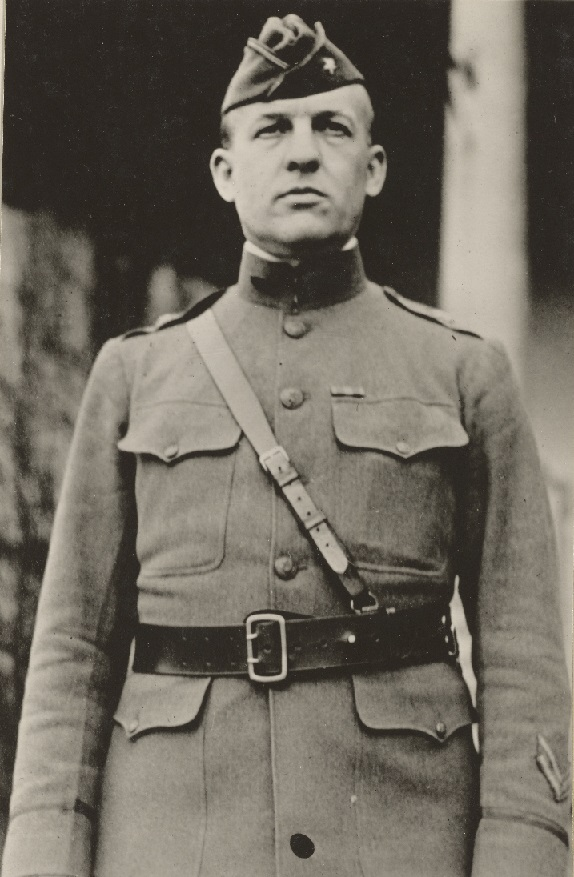
- Covell in 1919. National Archives and Records Administration.
- Born: 22 June 1875; Grand Rapids, Michigan
- Died: 26 August 1952 (aged 77); Plymouth, Massachusetts
- Burial place: Arlington National Cemetery
- Military career
- Allegiance: United States of America
- Branch: United States Army
- Service years: 1892–1919
- Rank: Brigadier general
- Unit: Michigan Army National Guard
- Commands: 126th Infantry Regiment; 63rd Infantry Brigade, 32nd Division
- Conflicts: Spanish–American War; World War I
- Awards: Croix de Guerre

Louis Chapin Covell (June 22, 1875 – August 26, 1952) was a United States army officer and businessman. He served in the Spanish–American War and World War I, and later worked for several automotive companies, including General Motors.

== Early life ==
Covell was born on June 22, 1875, in Grand Rapids, Michigan, to Elliot Franklin Covell and Laura (Chapin) Covell. After graduating from Grand Rapids High School in 1893, he worked at the Macey Company as an advertising and sales manager. In 1915 he was the organizer and president of Covell-Hensen Company, an advertising and printing company.

== Military career ==
Covell enlisted in the Michigan National Guard on April 6, 1892. On June 26, 1895, he was commissioned as a second lieutenant. Covell served as a captain in the Spanish–American War, advanced to major in 1900 and was promoted to lieutenant colonel in 1911. Covell became a brigadier general in the National Guard on February 7, 1917, and the National Army on August 5, 1917. He served during WWI in the American Expeditionary Force, commanding the 63rd Infantry Brigade. Covell received the French Croix de Guerre for his service and was discharged on February 17, 1919.

== Later life and career ==
After returning to civilian life, Covell was a manager at the Reynolds Chrysler Company in Flint, Michigan, and later a sales executive at General Motors in Detroit. In retirement, he lived in Maryland, New York and Virginia.

== Death and burial ==
Covell died in Plymouth, Massachusetts, on August 26, 1952. He was buried at Arlington National Cemetery.

He was a member of the American Legion, Sons of the American Revolution and the Military Order of Foreign Wars. Covell was also a Congregationalist, Freemason and Republican.

== Family ==
On 12 June 1906, Covell married Florence Holcomb Davidson (1879–1959). They were the parents of three sons: George Davidson (1907–1980), Louis Chapin (1909–2000), and Robert Leonard (1915–1987).
