= Howard Russell Hickok =

United States Army general

Howard Russell Hickock
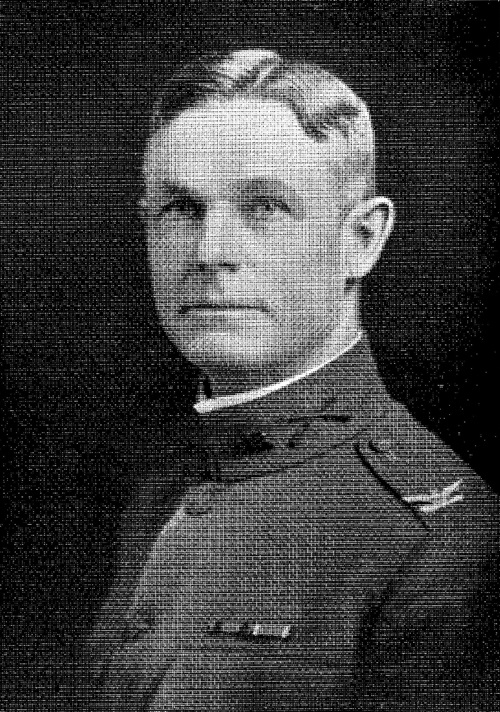
- Hickok as a colonel
- Born: November 26, 1870; Florida, Missouri, U.S.
- Died: July 7, 1926 (aged 55); Walter Reed Army Medical Center, Washington, D.C., U.S.
- Spouse: Anna Elizabeth Whitbread
- Military career
- Allegiance: United States
- Branch: United States Army
- Service years: 1892–1926
- Rank: Brigadier General
- Service number: 0-407
- Commands: 19th Infantry Brigade; Arizona District; 7th Cavalry Regiment (Acting); 4th Cavalry Regiment
- Conflicts: Philippine–American War; Moro Rebellion; World War I

Howard Russell Hickok (November 26, 1870 – July 7, 1926) was a United States Army officer in the late 19th and early 20th centuries. He served in World War I, among other conflicts.

== Biography ==
Hickok was born on November 26, 1870, in Florida, Missouri. He graduated from the United States Military Academy in 1892.

Hickok was commissioned into the 9th Cavalry Regiment, serving in the Northwestern U.S. and in Arizona and New Mexico. He served on duty with the U.S. National Guard in Pennsylvania and Washington, D.C., in 1904. He then served in the District of Alaska, and later in the Philippines, participating in both the Philippine–American War and the Moro Rebellion. Hickok graduated from the Infantry and Cavalry School with honors in 1906. After serving with the provisional government of Cuba from 1906 to 1907, he graduated from the Army Staff College at Fort Leavenworth, Kansas in 1908. He also served on the national guards of various states, including Indiana, Georgia, Florida, Mississippi, and West Virginia. Hickok graduated from the United States Army War College in June 1911 and then served as assistant director of the War College until June 1912.

Hickok was promoted to the temporary rank of colonel on August 5, 1917, and became the Chief of Staff of the 5th Division, serving in Europe because of World War I. On June 26, 1918, he was promoted to brigadier general, and he returned to the U.S. to assume command of the 19th Infantry Brigade of the 10th Division in Camp Funston. After the war's end, Hickok commanded the Arizona District from March to May 1919. He then reverted to his permanent rank of lieutenant colonel and served at Fort Bliss with the 7th Cavalry Regiment. Hickok was acting commander of the regiment during an engagement with Mexican bandits near Juárez in June 1919. He graduated from a second course at the Army War College in 1920 and then, having received a permanent promotion to colonel, commanded the 4th Cavalry Regiment at Fort Brown. Hickok then served as the Sixth Corps Area inspector in Chicago.

Hickok became ill and was hospitalized for six months. He was at the Army–Navy General Hospital at Hot Springs, Arkansas, and then at Walter Reed Army Medical Center. He died on July 7, 1926. Although Hickok died at the rank of colonel, Congress posthumously restored his brigadier general rank in June 1930. Hickok is buried at Arlington National Cemetery.

== Personal life ==
Hickok married Anna Elizabeth Whitbread, who was from Syracuse, New York, on June 3, 1895.

== Bibliography ==
- Davis, Henry Blaine Jr. (1998). Generals in Khaki. Raleigh, North Carolina: Pentland Press. ISBN 1571970886. OCLC 40298151.
