= James Ancil Shipton =

United States Army officer

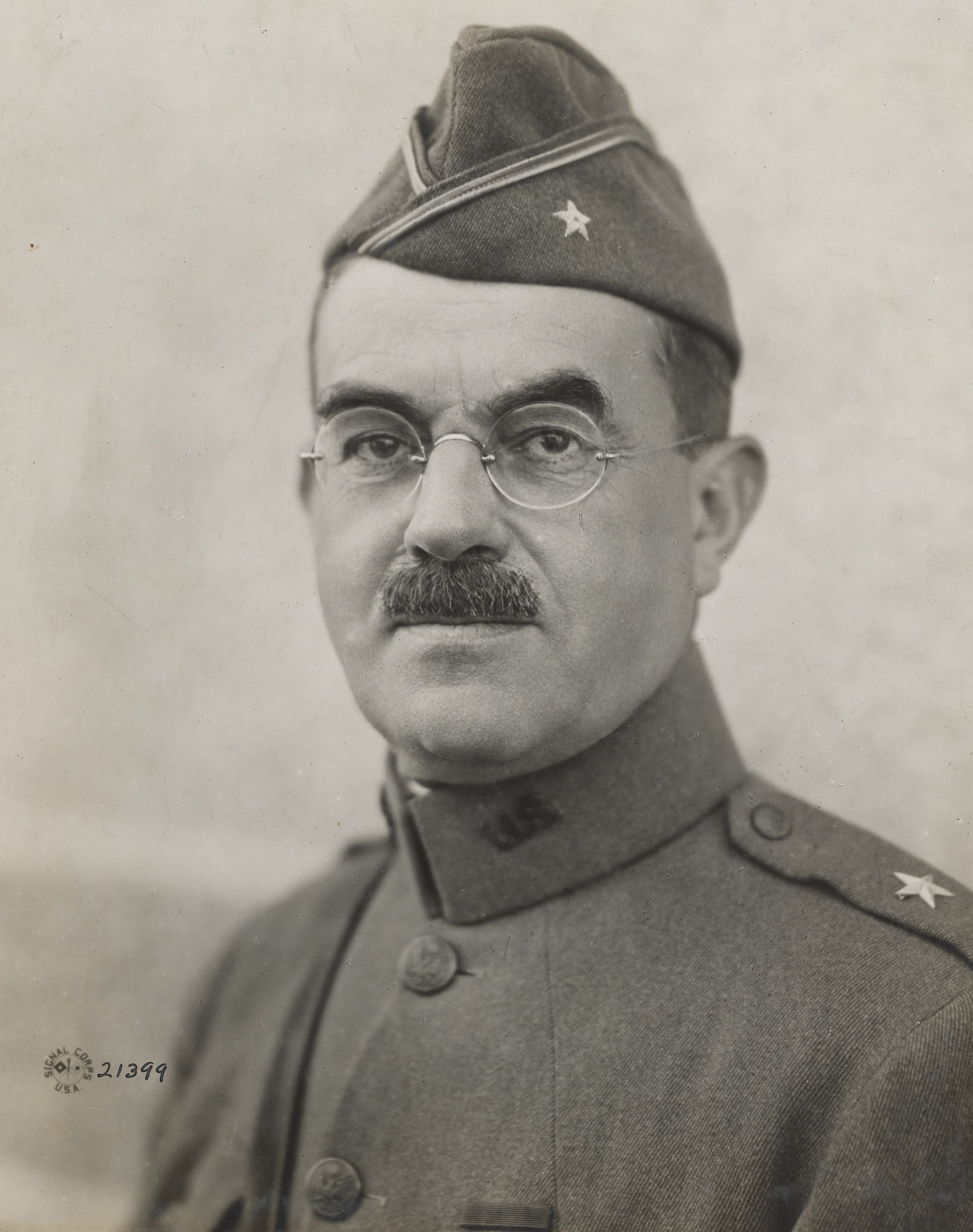
- Brigadier general James A. Shipton in October 1918
- Born: March 10, 1867; Ironton, Ohio, United States
- Died: February 15, 1926 (aged 58); Little Rock, Arkansas, United States
- Burial place: Mount Holly Cemetery, Little Rock, Arkansas
- Spouse: Georgia L. Shipton (nee Lincoln)
- Military career
- Allegiance: United States of America
- Branch: United States Army
- Service years: 1892–1920
- Rank: Brigadier General (posthumously)
- Commands: American Anti-Aircraft Service; 55th Field Artillery Brigade
- Conflicts: Philippine–American War; World War I
- Awards: Legion of Honour

Brigadier General James Ancil Shipton (March 10, 1867 – February 15, 1926) was a senior United States Army officer. He served in the Philippine–American War and World War I, where he held various commands on the Western Front.

== Early life ==
James Ancil Shipton was born in Ironton, Ohio on March 10, 1867, and was raised on a farm.

== Military service ==
=== World War I ===
==== Creation and command of the American Anti-Aircraft Service ====
On 26 July 1917, Brigadier General Shipton and two other officers, Captains Glenn Preston Anderson and George F. Humbert, departed for France with orders to "investigate the subject of antiaircraft defense as developed by the British and French at schools and at the front." The party was soon tasked with the organization of the A.E.F.'s antiaircraft defenses, and the American Anti-Aircraft Service (A.A.S.) formed as a result. Shipton mainly concentrated his attention on logistical matters while Anderson and Humbert were heavily involved in the actual development of the service.

By late October 1917 the structure for the A.A.S. was created, and the cadre for its Anti-Aircraft Artillery School (A.A.A. School) was trained. Personnel began to fill in the empty positions within the service. Shipton became its first commander on October 10 and remained in this position until June 29, 1918. Colonel Jay P. Hopkins, a former A.A.A. School director whom worked closely with Shipton, replaced Shipton as commander.

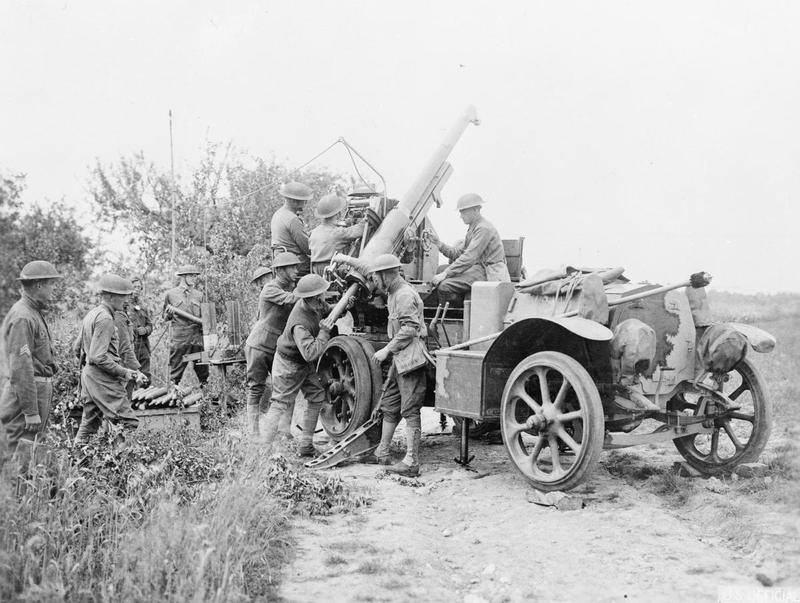
75 mm anti-aircraft gun on camouflaged motor-lorry mounting, of Battery "B", '1st Anti-Aircraft Regiment,' Second Division, in action at Montreuil on June 5, 1918.

Shipton instructed student officers at the A.A.A. School that the primary purpose of the A.A.S. was "to protect our own forces and establishments from hostile attack and observation from the air" by keeping "enemy aeroplanes at a distance." Their efficiency in combat would not be determined by how many airplanes they shot down. Nonetheless, units within the service revelled in the number of kills they received at the front. A German L.V.G. observation plane, shot down south-east of Verdun on May 18, 1918, was the first victory of the service. Shipton was himself excited and sent a fragment of the downed aircraft to Colonel F.K. Ferguson, Commandant of the Coast Artillery Corps. The policy for a unit to claim an official victory stipulated that it had to be done in an American unit and not on foreign equipment. The 2nd A.A. Battery, responsible for the 18 May victory, was training at the time with French forces and their victory was not officially recognized. The official number of airplanes downed by the service during the war was fifty-eight.

In keeping in line with their primary objective to keep "enemy aeroplanes at a distance," the A.A.S. was assigned by the General Headquarters (GHQ) of the A.E.F. to protect a number of important military installations. Shipton installed his first anti-aircraft defense system at Is-sur-Tille to protect Ordnance Depot No. One. Aerodromes initially received low priority in regards to receiving anti-aircraft defense systems. On June 8, 1918, GHQ approved a request to install air defense artillery at airfields that experienced aerial bombardment. These included Ourches, Colombey-les-Belles, and Orly airfields. Effective protection at these sites and all sites under the protection of the A.A.S., in general, was problematic for Shipton due to gun shortages and lack of trained personnel. These problems persisted in the A.A.S. for the duration of the war following Shipton's transfer in June 1918. Nonetheless, the immediate post war era saw "the creation of a fledging organization manned by well-trained personnel" whose wartime efficiency was higher than French and British anti-aircraft gunners.

==== Commanding the 55th Field Artillery Brigade ====
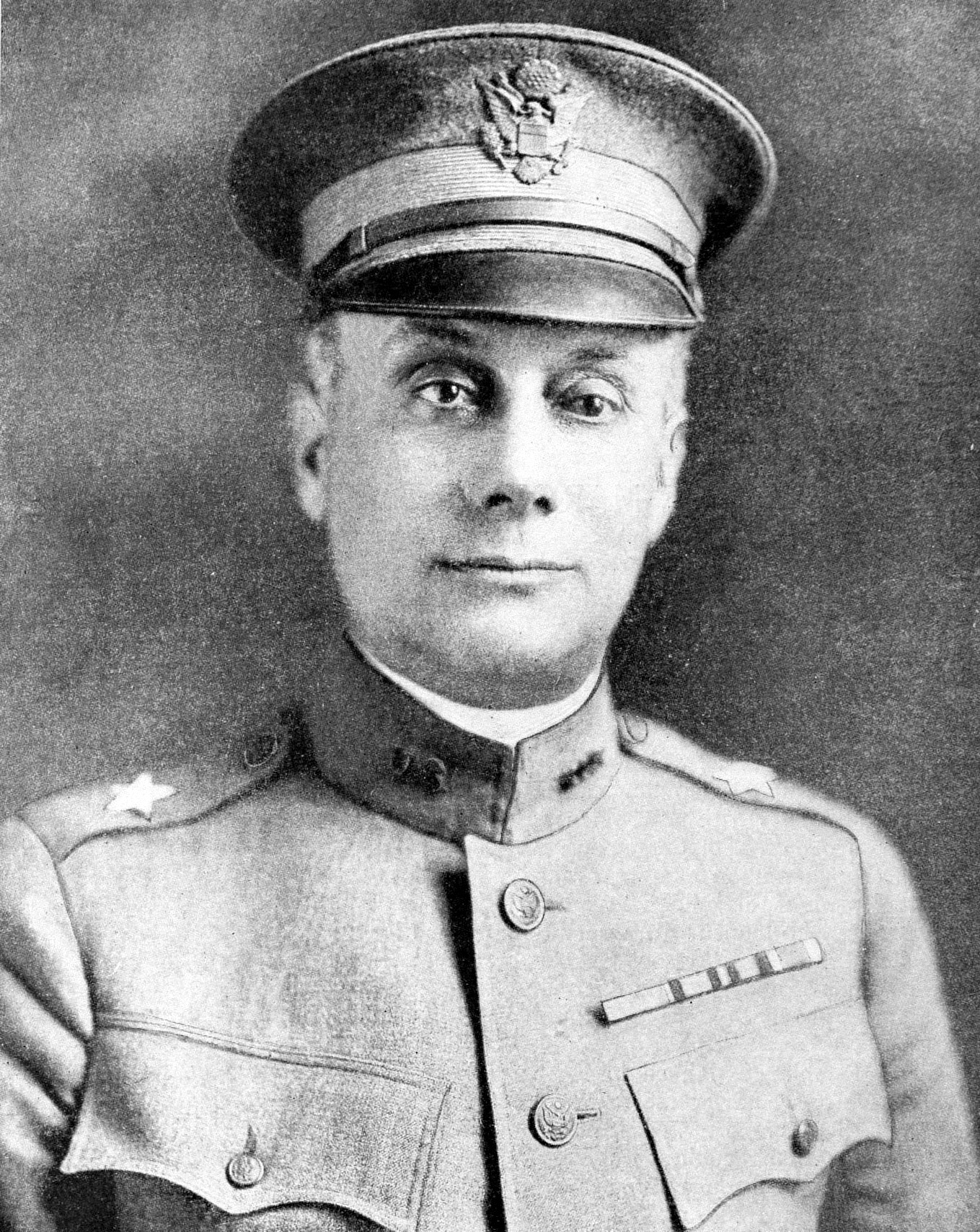
Brigadier-general William M. Wright commanded the 89th Infantry Division during the St. Mihiel offensive.

In early July 1918, Shipton was assigned command of the Fifty-fifth Field Artillery Brigade. Moved to the front on August 20 from their training grounds at Camp de Coëtquidan, the brigade was attached to the Eighty-ninth Infantry Division under the command of Major-General William M. Wright from August 26 to September 14. It was during this time that the division participated in the St. Mihiel offensive from September 12 to 15. Shipton replaced Colonel le Chaunac, a French officer, as commander of the division's artillery which included an assortment of French artillery units and now the Fifty-fifth Artillery Brigade. On September 14, as the division was engaged in combat, Shipton received orders to withdraw his brigade and proceed to another front. Wright protested the transfer as he would be left "with practically no artillery support." The transfer proceeded. Command of the division's artillery reverted to le Chaunac. He moved into Wright's headquarters and quickly set to work in bringing up French artillery to the front. Le Chaunac was credited by unit historians from both the Eighty-ninth Infantry Division and Fifty-fifth Artillery Brigade as having played a major role in the division successfully achieving its objectives during the battle. Despite withdrawing early, Shipton and the role of his brigade in the battle was nonetheless recognized by Wright. The Major-General heard "nothing but praise from the officers and men of the Division for the way the artillery was handled and conducted itself."

Shipton withdrew his brigade from the St. Mihiel offensive during the night of September 14. All the units came under enemy shell fire as they went through the town of Essey. Bivouacking at le Faux Bois Nauginsard at 5:00 o'clock the following morning, the men of the brigade found themselves in a swampy wilderness. It was here that dying and unserviceable draft animals were abandoned.

== Promotions ==
Insignia	Rank	Component	Date
	Captain	Artillery Corps	July 1, 1901
	Major	Coast Artillery Corps	December 7, 1909
	Lieutenant Colonel	Coast Artillery Corps	July 1, 1916
	Colonel, Temporary	Coast Artillery Corps	August 5, 1917
	Brigadier General	National Army	August 5, 1917; Honorably discharged on November 11, 1918
	Colonel	Coast Artillery Corps	May 29, 1918; Retired on February 22, 1920
