= Tracy Campbell Dickson =

United States Army general

Tracy Dickson
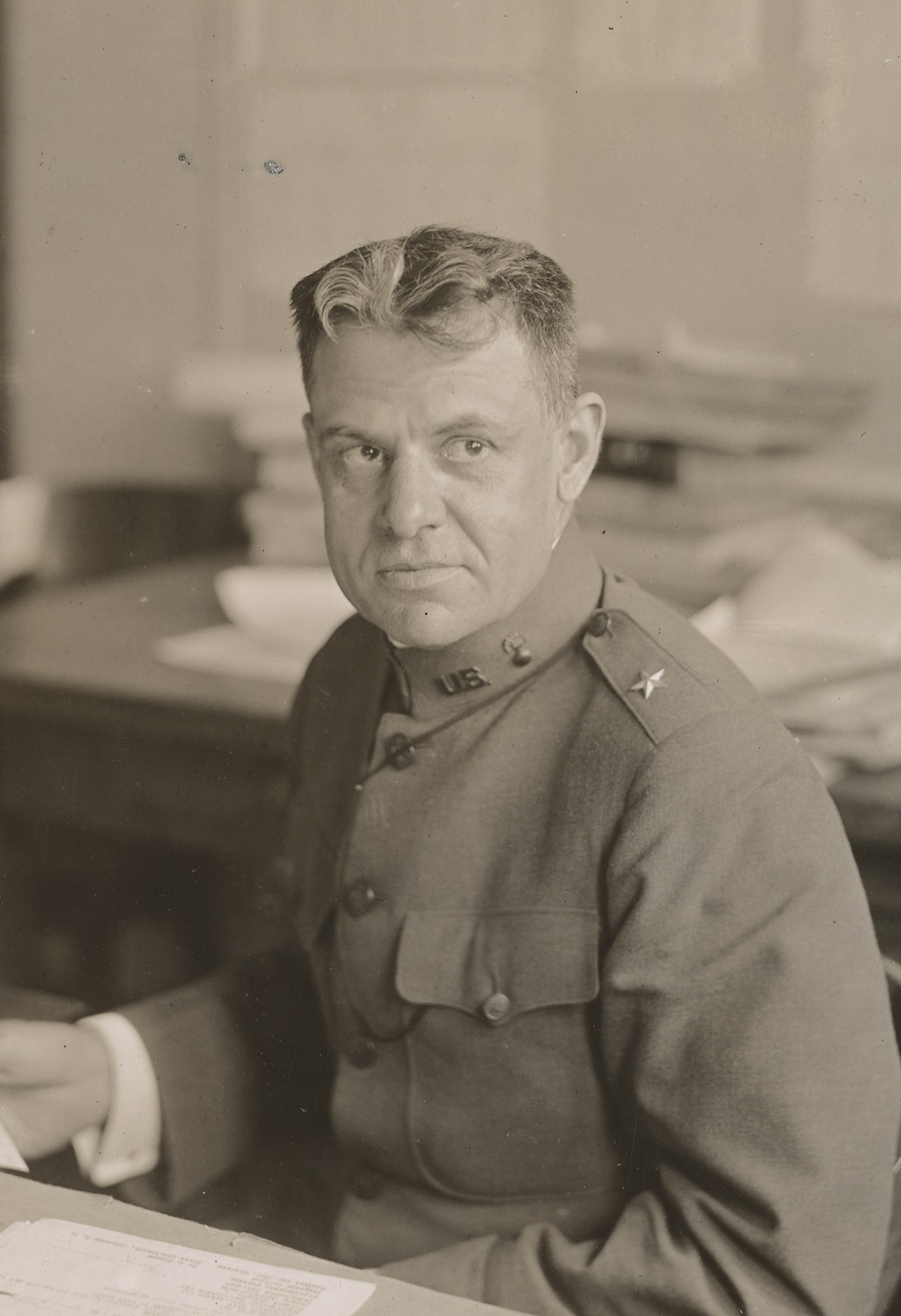
- Brig. gen. Dickson, Office Chief of Ordonance in April 1918
- Born: September 17, 1868; Independence, Iowa
- Died: May 17, 1936 (aged 67); Haverford, Pennsylvania
- Spouse: Isabella Kendrick Abbott
- Children: 2
- Military career
- Allegiance: United States
- Branch: United States Army; Ordnance Corps
- Service years: 1892–1914; 1916–1933
- Rank: Brigadier general
- Service number: 0-359
- Conflicts: World War I

Tracy Campbell Dickson (September 17, 1868 – May 17, 1936) was a United States Army officer in the late 19th and early 20th centuries.

== Biography ==
Dickson was born in Independence, Iowa, on September 17, 1868. His father had served with the Ninth New York Cavalry during the American Civil War.

Dickson graduated from the United States Military Academy in 1892 at sixth in his class, and he was commissioned in the Second Artillery, though he was transferred to ordnance when he became a first lieutenant. From 1894 to 1899, Dickson served as an assistant to the commanding officer at the Springfield Armory as well as an inspector, and between 1899 and 1902, he again served as an assistant at the Rock Island Arsenal. From 1902 to 1906, Dickson served as an assistant to the Chief of Ordnance, and from 1906 to 1910, he served as an assistant to the commander at Sandy Hook Proving Ground. During this time, Dickson served on several boards, including a joint Army-Navy-Marine board in 1898 intended to make their calibers uniform, as well as the board that adopted the M1903 Springfield rifle.

Dickson served on the construction effort of the Panama Canal. From 1907 to 1910, for example, he served on the Isthmian Canal Commission, overseeing repair work and the designing of permanent repair shops. Between 1910 and 1914, he served as the inspector of shops during the canal construction. Dickson chose to retire at the rank of colonel in April 1914.

Dickson was recalled to active duty on September 17, 1916, serving at the Watertown Armory as well as on the board that adopted several Browning machine guns, and he was given command of the Watertown Arsenal on March 17, 1917. On January 10, 1918, Dickson was promoted to the rank of brigadier general. After serving as the Assistant Chief of Ordnance, Dickson was given authority over production at Bethlehem Steel. After his transfer again to Watertown, New York, Dickson led the building of the arsenal there, and in 1920, he was given consolidated command of the ordnance schools. He retired in 1933.

== Death and legacy ==
Moving to Haverford, Pennsylvania, to live with his son, Dickson died on May 17, 1936, while taking a walk.

== Bibliography ==
- Davis, Henry Blaine Jr. (1998). Generals in Khaki. Raleigh, North Carolina: Pentland Press. ISBN 1571970886. OCLC 40298151.
- Marquis Who's Who (1975). Who Was Who In American History – The Military. Chicago, Illinois: Marquis Who's Who. ISBN 0837932017.
