= John McAuley Palmer (United States Army officer) =

United States Army general (1870–1955)

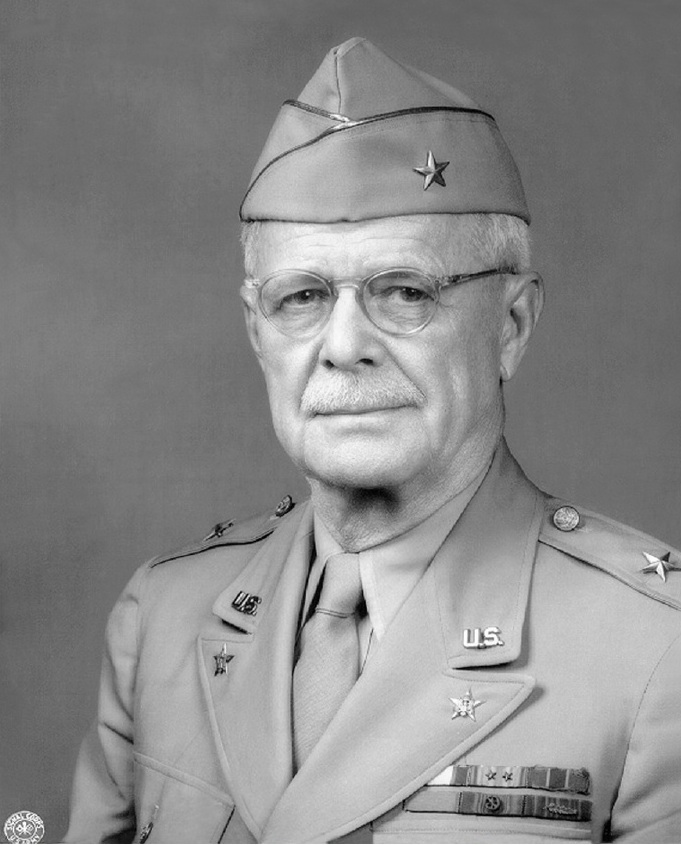
- Born: April 23, 1870; Carlinville, Illinois
- Died: October 26, 1955 (aged 85); Washington, D.C.
- Burial place: Arlington National Cemetery
- Military career
- Allegiance: United States of America
- Branch: United States Army
- Service years: 1892–1926, 1941–1946
- Rank: Brigadier General
- Commands: 58th Infantry Brigade; 19th Infantry Brigade
- Conflicts: Spanish–American War; Boxer Rebellion; Philippine–American War; World War I World War II
- Awards: Army Distinguished Service Medal (2)
- Other work: Author

John McAuley Palmer (April 23, 1870 – October 26, 1955) was a soldier and administrator in the United States Army.

== Early life and start of career ==
Born in Carlinville, Illinois, he was the son of John and Ellen Palmer, and the grandson and namesake of John McAuley Palmer, a famous American Civil War general and Governor of Illinois. He was educated in Springfield, Illinois, graduated from West Point in 1892, and was appointed a second lieutenant of infantry, initially assigned to the 15th Infantry at Fort Sheridan, Illinois. He participated in the suppression of the Chicago railroad riots of 1894, then went to Cuba as an aide to Samuel S. Sumner (1898–1899) during the Spanish–American War.

Following his Cuba service, he became a member of the China Relief Expedition, after which he became an instructor and assistant professor of chemistry at West Point. Following this academic stint, he was then assigned a billet as governor of Lanao District on Mindanao in the Philippines during the Moro Rebellion. Upon return from Far East Service, he was a student at the United States Army Command and General Staff College. After graduating he was assigned to the War Department General Staff under the command of the then-Army Chief of Staff Leonard Wood in 1908. During this period of service he received recognition as a writer and advocate on military theory.

== Later career and World War I ==
In 1910 he rejoined his regiment in Tientsin (Tianjin) China and was promoted to the permanent rank of major. He was then transferred to the 24th Infantry on Corregidor and was instrumental in creating the plans for the defense of the Bataan Peninsula (1914–1916).

Following this assignment, he returned to the General Staff in Washington, D.C. (1916) and on the outbreak of the First World War was instrumental in drafting the Draft Act of 1917 and plans for an American Expeditionary Force (AEF). This work caught the notice of Major General John J. Pershing, who selected Palmer to become his Assistant Chief of Staff for Operations, G-3, where he went to France and set up operational plans and staff schools for the American Army. He left the AEF staff due to illness, but recovered in time, as a colonel, to command the 58th Infantry Brigade of the 29th Division in combat against the enemy at Verdun in the Meuse-Argonne Offensive that helped to end World War I. He received the Army Distinguished Service Medal for his service in France. The citation for the medal reads:

The President of the United States of America, authorized by Act of Congress, July 9, 1918, takes pleasure in presenting the Army Distinguished Service Medal to Colonel (Infantry) John McAuley Palmer, United States Army, for exceptionally meritorious and distinguished services to the Government of the United States, in a duty of great responsibility during World War I. In the organization of the Operations Section of the General Staff, American Expeditionary Forces, Colonel Palmer displayed sound tactical judgment and breadth of vision, and the ultimate success of the American plan of campaign was largely due to his detailed plans. As Commander of the 58th Infantry Brigade, 29th Division, during the severe fighting north of Verdun, in the Meuse-Argonne offensive, his services were conspicuous and his brigade successful.

As the principal formulator of military policy following World War I, he was the guiding force in the creation of the National Defense Act of 1920. It was this Act which reaffirmed America's reliance upon the citizen-soldier for her defense and established the "Total Army" composed of the Regular Army, the National Guard, and the Army Reserve. In this work he was strongly influenced by his reading of Carl von Clausewitz's book On War. For his accomplishments, he was made aide-de-camp to Army Chief of Staff John J. Pershing (1921–1923) and promoted to permanent brigadier general in the Regular Army (1922). He then completed his military career by commanding the 19th Infantry Brigade in Panama (1923–1926).

== Retirement and death ==
In retirement (1926), General Palmer continued to champion the cause of universal military service. He wrote numerous books and articles about military policy. A strong advocate of the role of the citizen-soldier in the army of a democracy, Palmer diverged from the views of Emory Upton, with whom he is often compared as a great philosophical thinker-philosopher of the U.S. Army.

He was recalled to active duty by Army Chief of Staff George C. Marshall (a personal friend and devotee of Palmer's) just prior to the Pearl Harbor attack and served as an advisor on military policy to the War Department General Staff throughout World War II. Palmer was the oldest American officer to serve in the military during the war.

Palmer retired again soon after the end of the Second World War, receiving a second Distinguished Service Medal.

He lived in Washington, D.C. where he died on October 26, 1955. Palmer was buried in Arlington National Cemetery, Section 34, Grave 50-A.

== Family ==
In 1893, Palmer married Maude Laning, and they were the parents of a son, John McAuley Palmer IV, who died at age 6, and a daughter, Mary Laning Palmer. Mary Palmer was married to Norman B. Chandler, and after his death during World War II she married George H. Rockwell. Mary Palmer was the mother of Army Colonels Norman Palmer Chandler (1924–1997) and John Palmer Chandler (1926–2015).

== Decorations ==
Brigadier General Palmer's ribbon bar included amongst others :

Distinguished Service Medal with Oak Leaf Cluster	World War I Victory Medal	Army of Occupation of Germany Medal
American Defense Service Medal	American Campaign Medal	World War II Victory Medal

== Published works ==
- An Army of the People (1916)
- Statesmanship or War (1927)
- Washington, Lincoln, Wilson (1930)
- General von Steuben (1937)
- America in Arms (1941).
