= Frank W. Coe =

United States Army general

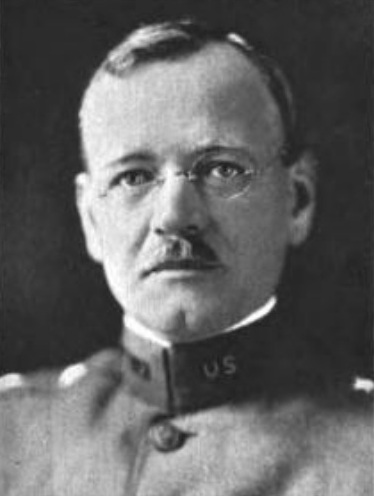
- Major General Frank W. Coe, Chief of Coast Artillery from 1918 to 1926
- Born: November 27, 1870; Manhattan, Kansas, US
- Died: May 25, 1947 (aged 76); Washington, D.C., US
- Burial place: Arlington National Cemetery
- Spouse(s): Anne Chamberlaine; Martha Pratt
- Military career
- Allegiance: United States
- Branch: United States Army
- Service years: 1892–1926
- Rank: Major General
- Service number: 0-11
- Commands: Coast Artillery School; Railway Artillery Reserve, First United States Army; Coast Artillery Corps
- Conflicts: Spanish–American War; Pancho Villa Expedition; World War I
- Awards: Army Distinguished Service Medal; Order of St. Michael and St. George (Britain); Legion of Honor (commander) (France)

Frank W. Coe (November 27, 1870 – May 25, 1947) was a major general in the United States Army. He is notable for having served as the Chief of Coast Artillery.

== Early life ==
Frank Winston Coe was born in Manhattan, Kansas, on November 27, 1870. He attended Kansas State Agricultural College for three years, and graduated from the United States Military Academy in 1892. Coe was appointed a second lieutenant of Field Artillery.

== Start of career ==
Coe's initial assignments with the 1st Field Artillery included Fort Hamilton, New York and Fort Monroe, Virginia.

== Spanish–American War ==
During the Spanish–American War Coe served at Key West Barracks, Florida, where his unit was responsible for the defense of the U.S. Atlantic Fleet.

== Post-Spanish–American War ==
Coe's post-war assignments included: instructor in mathematics at West Point; adjutant of the School of Submarine Defense at Fort Totten, New York; adjutant at West Point; adjutant at Fort Monroe; assistant to the Chief of Coast Artillery; director of the Coast Artillery School at Fort Monroe; and Coast Artillery postings at Governors Island and Fort Totten, New York, and Fort Kamehameha, Hawaii. In the years immediately prior to World War I he served as Del Rio, Texas during the Pancho Villa Expedition, and in San Francisco, California on the staff of the Army's Western Department.

== World War I ==
During World War I Coe served initially as chief of staff of the 1st Division in Saint-Nazaire, France. He was then promoted to brigadier general, and commanded the 1st Separate Coast Artillery Brigade, which was subsequently reorganized as the 30th Coast Artillery Brigade and then the Railway Artillery Reserve, First United States Army. He was succeeded by his brother in law, Brigadier General William Chamberlaine, as commander of the Railway Artillery Reserve.

For his World War I service Coe received the Army Distinguished Service Medal; the British Order of St. Michael and St. George, and the French Legion of Honor (commander). The citation for his Army DSM reads:

The President of the United States of America, authorized by Act of Congress, July 9, 1918, takes pleasure in presenting the Army Distinguished Service Medal to Major General Frank Winston Coe, United States Army, for exceptionally meritorious and distinguished services to the Government of the United States, in a duty of great responsibility during World War I, in the reorganization of the Coast Artillery, thereby enabling it to meet the great demand for overseas artillery.

== Chief of Coast Artillery ==
In June 1918, Coe was promoted to major general and assigned as Chief of Coast Artillery. He served in this post until retiring in 1926, when he was succeeded by Andrew Hero Jr.

In 1920, Coe received the honorary degree of LL.D. from the Kansas State Agricultural College.

== Retirement and death ==
Coe resided in Washington, D.C. after his retirement from the Army. He died at Walter Reed Army Medical Center on May 25, 1947 after several years of ill health and complications brought on by a broken hip. He was buried at Arlington National Cemetery, Section 3, Site 1868A.

== Family ==
Coe was the son of Manuel A. Coe and Mary Caroline Winston Coe. In 1895, he married Anne Chamberlaine of Norfolk, Virginia, who was the sister of Coe's West Point classmate William Chamberlaine. Frank and Anne Coe had one child, William C. Coe, who served in the Army and was the longtime secretary of the Army and Navy Club in Washington, D.C.

After the death of his first wife, Coe married Martha Pratt, daughter of Brigadier General Sedgwick Pratt.
