= Capers (name) =

Capers is both a surname and a given name. Notable people with the name include:

Surname:

- Byron Capers (born 1974), former professional American football player
- Charlotte Capers (1913–1996), American historian
- Cynthia Flynn Capers (born 1945), American nursing researcher
- Dom Capers (born 1950), American football coach
- Ellison Capers (1837–1908), American school teacher
- Francis W. Capers (1839–1892), American educator and Confederate Army General
- James C. Capers Jr. (born 1937), American Medal of Honor recipient
- Jean Murrell Capers (1913–2017), American judge
- John G. Capers (1866–1919), American attorney and politician
- Kevin Capers (born 1993), American professional basketball player
- Lefty Capers (1906–1961), American baseball player
- Legrand G. Capers (1834–1877), American physician
- Marcus Capers (born 1989), American professional basketball player
- Robert S. Capers (born 1949), American journalist
- Selvish Capers (born 1986), former professional American football player
- Valerie Capers (born 1935), American pianist
- Virginia Capers (1925–2004), Tony Award-winning American actress
- Wayne Capers (born 1961), former professional American football player
- William Capers (1790–1855), American Episcopal bishop
- William Theodotus Capers (1867–1943), American Episcopal bishop

Given name:

- Capers Funnye (born 1952), Jewish African-American rabbi
- Capers Jones, American specialist in software engineering methodologies
- Capers Williamson (born 1992), American javelin thrower
