= Caper (disambiguation) =

The caper is a perennial spiny shrub that bears rounded, fleshy leaves and big white to pinkish-white flowers, best known for the edible flower buds (capers).

Caper or Capers may also refer to:

== Dance ==
- A jump also known as a cabriole or capriole, in ballet and dressage

== People with the name ==
- Capers (name)
- Flavius Caper, a 2nd-century Latin grammarian

== Organizations ==
- Caper AI, retail smart cart and checkout subsidiary of Instacart
- CAPER, the Center for Addiction, Personality and Emotion Research at the University of Maryland, College Park
- CBU Capers, the athletic teams of Cape Breton University

== Other uses ==
- Capers (album), a 1981 album by saxophonist Steve Lacy
- Capers (1937 film), a German film directed by Gustaf Gründgens
- The Brooklyn Heist, also released as Capers, a 2008 film
- Caper film, another term for a heist film
- Caper Peak, located in Glacier National Park, Montana
- Caper, a resident of Cape Breton Island
- Caper, slang for a crime or mischievous act
- Caper elimia (Elimia olivula), a species of gastropod
- Caper spurge, Euphorbia lathyris, a plant whose seed pods look like capers

== See also ==
- Caper White (disambiguation)
