= Jueteng =

Numbers game played in the Philippines

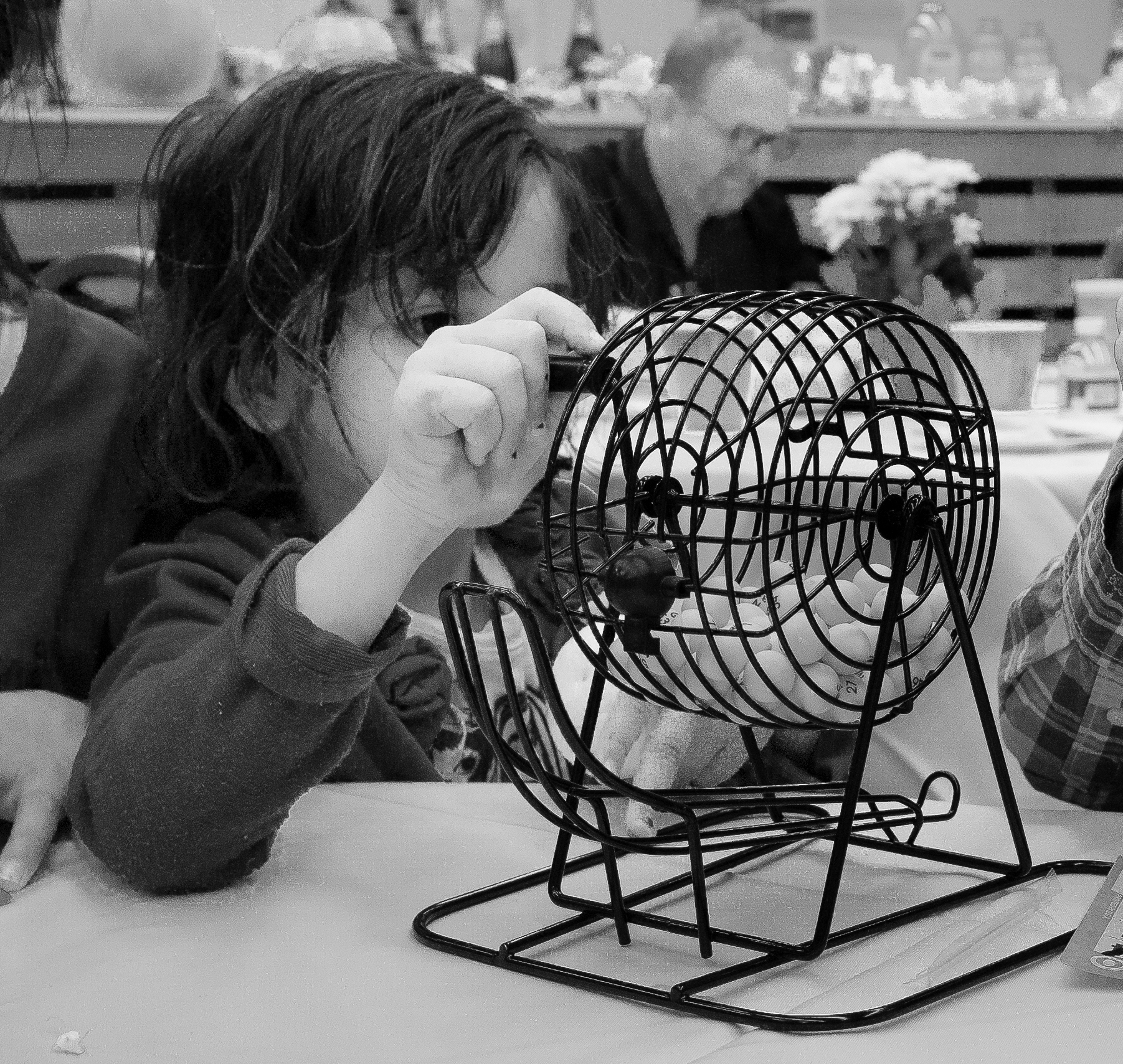
Jueteng is commonly played with the aid of a tambiolo.

Jueteng (Tagalog pronunciation: [(h)wɛtɛŋ]) is a numbers game played in the Philippines. First reported in the late 1800s while the Philippines was under Spanish rule, it was made illegal in 1907 after the United States occupied the Philippines. Despite this, and successive subsequent crackdowns, the game remains popular throughout Luzon, while similar games exist in the rest of the Philippines.

The game is popular among many Filipinos, especially in poorer communities. Due to a low buy-in and the prospect of a relatively lucrative payout, it is appealing and often considered harmless fun. Individuals who collect bets, known as kubrador, (Note: In the Tagalog language, words themselves do not change when made plural, but the use of mga before the word pluralizes it. So, depending on context, kubrador can be either singular or plural. See also: Tagalog grammar; Grammatical number § Number particles; Tagalog language § ng and mga.) are often considered trusted members of local communities. Different jueteng "lords" run their own competing games.

Enforcement of the game's illegality is often lax. Corruption is common, with police and government officials often being accused of running or benefiting from jueteng operations. One president of the Philippines, Joseph Estrada, was impeached, removed from office, and found guilty of plunder, in part due to accepting bribes from jueteng lords. The Philippine government operates the Philippine Charity Sweepstakes Office (PCSO) Small Town Lottery (STL) as a legal alternative to jueteng. However, corruption has led the PCSO to be accused of being a simple front for illegal jueteng operations.

Jueteng is very important to the Filipino informal economy. Jueteng operators and their staff were estimated to number 400,000 in 2009, and many rely on jueteng work for their livelihoods. Congress estimated the annual gross revenue of jueteng operators to be around US$1 billion in 2000. By 2019, this estimate had risen to US$1.4 billion.

== History ==
Under Spanish rule, a lottery was run in Manila, although it is unclear whether it was approved via Madrid or developed locally. It is unclear when exactly the practice of jueteng began in the Philippines, but it was mentioned in the Penal Code of 1887, which means it came to the Philippines around the 1800s. The use of Spanish-derived terms in the game suggest it developed under Spanish rule. By 1893, jueteng tickets were openly sold on inter-island ships. José Rizal is perhaps the most well-known early fan of jueteng: he won ₱6,200 while in exile in Dapitan, Zamboanga del Norte, which he used in part to buy a farm which is now a historical site.

The etymology of the word ultimately derives from Hokkien Chinese, specifically the Quanzhou Hokkien dialect of which modern Philippine Hokkien is descended from. The game is sometimes referred to as "Chinese jueteng", when it was introduced during the Spanish colonial times. In the 20th century games were often run by Chinese immigrants, although by the end of the century locals had taken over. It is thought that the term could originate from two Chinese characters, although opinions differ on which they were. When Chinese Filipino publications such as the World News refer to the game, they use the term, "花档" (simplified Chinese: 花档; traditional Chinese: 花檔), which means "flower shop" in standard Chinese (Mandarin). Although in 1977, a paper by Gloria Chan-Yap was made pointing to Hokkien Chinese as the source of the word, where the author pointed to the terms, "(hue 花 'flower', tn 檔 'space')", though by 1980, the same author would release another paper revising her findings with a different chinese character, now recording "(huê 花 'flower', tŋ̣̆ 擋 'space')". According to (Wang, 1982), "擋" used to be written as "當", and another author, E. Arsenio Manuel, from 1948 did also propose the etymology of the word from Hokkien Chinese as "[hoe(flower)-tng(pawn, bet)", where the likely chinese characters being referred to would be Hokkien Chinese: 花當; Pe̍h-ōe-jī: hoe-tǹg; lit. 'to spend and pawn'. Indeed as per Carstairs Douglas (1873), it can be found that in the Chinchew or Quanzhou dialect of Hokkien Chinese: 買花當; Pe̍h-ōe-jī: bóe hoe-tǹg means "to gamble in or buy into a game of jueteng". Furthermore, it is revealed that in other dialects of Hokkien Chinese, such as the Amoy or Xiamen dialect, it is known more as Hokkien Chinese: 花會; Pe̍h-ōe-jī: hoe-hē; lit. 'to meet and spend' and in the Changchew or Zhangzhou dialect of Hokkien Chinese: 花會; Pe̍h-ōe-jī: hoa-hōe; lit. 'to meet and spend', from which hence the term "wahoy" or "wahuy", another variant of jueteng, comes from.

Douglas (1873) explains that there are 2 kinds of the gambling game, one played using an octangular teetotum with 5 to 8 characters (either chinese character or drawings of old historical or legendary figures in Chinese history), while another has 37 characters (either chinese character or drawings of old historical or legendary figures in Chinese history) on cards and is played by shaking dice without a teetotum. The latter game is where jueteng in the Philippines comes from as 37 is the traditional number of lottery balls or raffle tickets used to draw out a winning number, but now played with balls or raffle tickets in a tambiolo container that is spun or a bottle-shaped receptacle or small-necked phial receptacle that is shaken, instead of using dice and cards. The practice of using a tambiolo was introduced from Spanish, which calls it as "tómbola", but the Spanish word and the practice itself in Spain traces back to Southern Italy, which in Italian is called "tombola". The carnival game of tómbola in Spain also refers to the revolving container drum and the place where it is played. Tambiolo, as a word, is basically "tómbola" + the Italian "-olo" diminutuve suffix.

Owing to its history in mainland China, specifically Coastal China, it was more popularly and historically known in Chinese: 花會; lit. 'flower meeting', '(figurative) to meet and spend', read in Amoy Hokkien Chinese: 花會; Pe̍h-ōe-jī: hoe-hē; lit. 'to meet and spend' and in Mandarin Chinese: 花會; pinyin: huāhuì and in Cantonese Chinese: 花會; Jyutping: faa^{1} wui^{6-2}. The gambling numbers game started out around the time of the early Ming Dynasty period and grew in popularity during the late Qing dynasty period and spread from Fujian, Guangdong, Guangxi, Shanghai, Zhejiang, Jiangsu, Tianjin, Beijing, and spread further across Inland China and abroad, such as in Taiwan and the Philippines. It was banned last in China in 1949, but the practice continued in secret under the informal economy and the authorities of British Hong Kong would crack down on the practice in 1975 by setting up government-run lotteries to regulate and compete against illegal private lotteries and allocate the proceeds for charity. In early 1985, mainland China authorities in Guangdong province also began to issue lottery tickets across the province, setting a precedent for the first government-run lottery since the founding of the PRC and regulating illegal informal private lottery activities.

When the Philippines became an American colony, the government cracked down on jueteng. In 1907, it was specifically made illegal by the colonial-era Philippine Legislature through Act No. 1757. Since independence, various administrations have continued to try different tactics to end the practice, without success. Jueteng existed even during the martial law era, although not as openly. With the restoration of democracy, jueteng networks quickly expanded and became key sources of political information and support, up to the Presidential level. Finances from these networks served as an alternative source of power to state institutions thought still favorable to the martial law era, substituting for expenses that before martial law would have come through party finances. This link to power allowed local networks to consolidate into provincial and regional networks.

== Gameplay ==
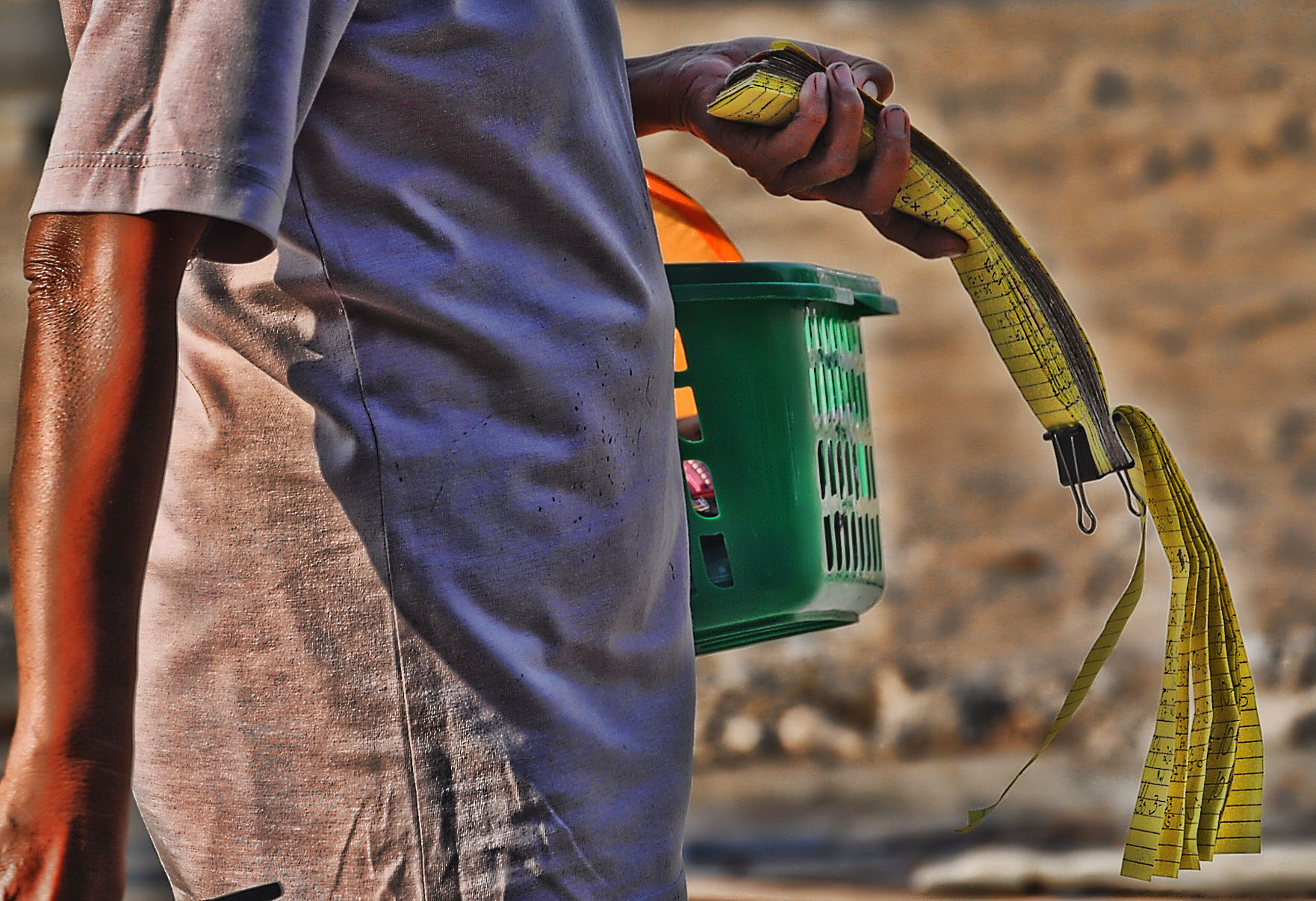
A kubrador plies his trade in San Juan, Ilocos Sur. He carries a notepad of all the bets he's collected that day, along with other supplies for playing jueteng.

A list of jueteng numbers from bettors in Baguio at different times of a single day.

Jueteng is a numbers game. Before the game, jueteng solicitors, colloquially known as kubrador (cobrador), collect bets house to house. They are supervised by higher level operators known as kabo (cabo), who are responsible for managing operations within a certain community. At the top are the bankero (banqueros), also known as kapitalista (capitalistas) or "jueteng lords".

Some kubrador may also erect stalls or kiosks on the street to attract bettors. The bettor picks two numbers from one to thirty-seven (in some versions, thirty-eight). Depending on the kubrador, the game either occurs right then and there, or, more commonly, the kubrador will return later with any winnings.

Bets can be as low as ₱0.25, and it is usual for three games to take place each day. A bet of only ₱1 can win between ₱400 and ₱1,000, with payout often depending on the number of entries. A tambiolo (lottery drum) is often used in conjunction with thirty-seven bolas (balls) to mix up the numbers. Despite this, cheating by the operators of the game is still possible. Each of the numbers has a specific association within jueteng mythology. Various superstitions exist as to which numbers should be chosen, and some kubrador even encourage such beliefs by offering to tell someone their lucky numbers based on their dreams; when a kubrador interprets signs for a bettor, this is called degla.

== Government responses ==
Jueteng is officially illegal in the Philippines, though enforcement of the law is lax. The decentralized nature of the game, and the multitude of operators, make it hard to eliminate. In some areas the game is run by government officials. The penalties for playing jueteng are officially laid out in Republic Act 9287 (based on Presidential Decree 1602); for a simple bettor, the penalty is only thirty to ninety days in jail. Some, such as Justice Marvic Leonen, have questioned the wisdom of going after jueteng bettors when other types of gambling, such as Philippine Offshore Gaming Operators, are allowed to freely proliferate. This selectivity has also been criticized as it targets the activities of the poor and not that of the rich. President Fidel V. Ramos suggested it should be legalized. Bills to this effect have even been introduced into the Congress of the Philippines.

Tackling jueteng was not seen as a priority by President Benigno Aquino III. However, he appointed Jesse Robredo, who worked to eliminate jueteng in the City of Naga while he was its mayor, as Secretary of the Interior and Local Government. In 2012 the Pangasinan police chief was fired by the national government for failing to stop gambling, after the Pangasinan Governor was accused of benefiting from jueteng. Six other police chiefs were also fired under similar circumstances. Following Robredo's death in a plane crash, jueteng reportedly expanded.

President Rodrigo Duterte suggested the game should be legalized in 2016. Duterte has however taking action against illegal gambling operations, which he accuses of being run under the facade of legitimate government operations. In 2018 Duterte suggested leaving jueteng out of his crackdown on illegal gambling, although this was quickly retracted. In mid-2019 he again announced an easing of a crackdown against the game, citing its role in providing income, and fears those who lose that income would turn to activities such as the drug trade. Around the same time, police chiefs were declared responsible if jueteng operations continued to occur under their areas of jurisdiction.

=== Sanctioned jueteng ===
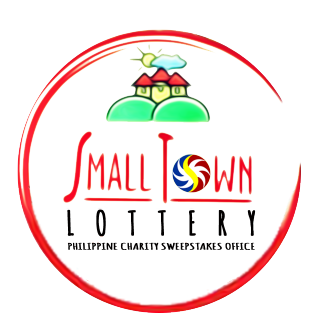
Logo of the PCSO's Small Town Lottery

Although much has been tried to eradicate this form of unregulated gambling by the government, all such efforts have failed due to the game's widespread popularity. In 1987 under the Presidency of Corazon Aquino, the Philippine Charity Sweepstakes Office (PCSO) first sanctioned and began operating a similar game, called the "Small Town Lottery" (STL). This was meant to compete with illegal operations, and direct revenue from the games to the government. They increased the number that bettors have to choose from 37 to 40. This choice was made to seemingly detach STL's identity from that of jueteng and decrease the odds of winning. STL was suspended in 1990, following which an investigation by the House of Representatives found that STL franchises were given to known jueteng operators. However, the game was revived in 2005, under the Presidency of Gloria Macapagal Arroyo, following which it was asserted that jueteng operations increased. It was suspended by President Duterte for a month in 2019, with Duterte asserting "massive corruption" within the PCSO board. The Philippine National Police reported a rise in jueteng operations during this time. Individuals who relied on the STL for income stated they would be forced to return to jueteng if the STL remained closed.

It has been asserted that illegal jueteng games were also run through branches and staff of the PCSO. The Commission on Audit estimates that corrupt PCSO STL practices cost the government a combined ₱14.9 billion in missing receipts in 2017 and 2018. The Catholic Bishops' Conference of the Philippines has come out against the STL.

STL, along with other PCSO lottery games, was suspended in Luzon during the COVID-19 pandemic.

=== Politicians and unsanctioned jueteng ===
One study estimated that a third of all money collected goes to the operators, with another third going to bribes for police and politicians. The Catholic Church in the Philippines has admitted to receiving proceeds from gambling. One of the suggested reasons for legalization was to eliminate repeated corruption scandals emphasizing the apparent inability of the ban to be enforced, and the significant drain on police resources created by the need for enforcement. It has been compared to the tribulations in the United States regarding their prohibition of alcohol.

The Corazon Aquino administration was closely tied to jueteng networks, with her antigambling enforcer later confessing to collecting finances from jueteng operators.

Former Puerto Princesa Mayor Edward Hagedorn has admitted to being a former jueteng operator, and used connections and funds developed from the industry to win the mayoral election in 1992. He claimed to have halted operations upon becoming mayor, while hiring former jueteng workers through the city government.

In an impeachment trial running from December 2000 to January 2001, President Joseph Estrada was charged with "bribery", "graft and corruption", "betrayal of public trust", and "culpable violation of the Constitution". The accusations against him included accepting over ₱10 million in the three years from 1998 to 2000 from jueteng lords. After the trial collapsed following his impeachment, protests broke out and he was ousted from power after the army withdrew support for him in 2001. He was succeeded by his vice-president, Gloria Macapagal Arroyo, who had previously resigned from his cabinet in protest. He was later taken to trial and charged with four counts of corruption. On September 12, 2007, he was found guilty of plunder on two counts, including receiving payoffs from illegal gambling.

President Arroyo had close ties with a jueteng family from Pampanga. She became enmeshed in her own political scandal in June 2005, after allegations emerged that some of her relatives, including her husband, son, and brother-in-law, were involved in jueteng operations. This was viewed by some as an exacerbating overall corruption within the country. Arroyo announced her husband would leave the country in an effort to reduce pressure on her to resign. Arroyo faced multiple impeachment attempts on similar grounds to Estrada. Six weeks after Estrada was convicted, Arroyo pardoned him. Hagedorn briefly served under Arroyo as an anti-gambling czar.

== Participation ==
A 2005 Social Weather Stations survey found that over half of all adult Filipinos had engaged in some form of gambling over the previous year. Jueteng was the second most popular form of gambling overall, being second for women and fourth for men. The survey estimated this meant 6.9 million had played Jueteng, including 3.7 million (15% of) men and 3.2 million (13% of) women. Despite its popularity, most people reported it as extensively damaging public morality, with a majority feeling this even among non-jueteng playing gamblers. There was also an absolute majority against legalization.

The low cost of a ticket leads many to consider the gambling relatively harmless, with no-one clearly suffering due to the practice. It is even often seen as a community activity. Due to the illegality of the game and the subsequent opaqueness and lack of a formal structure, a high degree of trust by the bettor in their kubrador is required. This trust is in part due to their being members of the community. Some inherit the job directly from their parents, while others are chosen due to already being a trusted member of the community. Such trust can lead to kubradors being relied on for other tasks, such as collecting donations for sick individuals. Trust is also required in the people running the particular jueteng game, lest bettors switch to another jueteng lord. If such a switch occurs, the new lords often hire the existing kubradors due to their existing integration into the communities.

As there is no limit on how few or many bets can be taken in one game, and the odds of winning are more achievable than a traditional lottery but still long enough that a significant amount can be won, the game is very appealing to Filipinos living in poverty. While the payouts are not high, they can be extremely significant for those living in poverty.

Jueteng is very important to the Filipino informal economy; Congress estimated the annual gross revenue of jueteng operators to be around US$1 billion in 2000. The estimated value of ₱38 billion in 2010 exceeded the ₱30 billion brought in by the government-run Philippine Amusement and Gaming Corporation.

By 2019, this estimate had risen to US$1.4 billion, with operations earning up to ₱200 million of revenue daily in Luzon. Jueteng operators and their staff were estimated to number 400,000 in 2009. At one point, it was estimated that 20,000 people in San Fernando, Pampanga, alone derived their primary income from the game. Through commissions, a kubrador may earn up to ₱200 daily. Some even take 10% of winnings.

Jueteng has spread to Filipino communities in Italy.

=== Similar games ===
While Jueteng is mostly popular in Luzon, a related numbers game, played predominately in Visayas and Mindanao, is known as masiao. Masiao originally was played based on radio broadcasts announcing the winning players in jai alai. However, as jai alai's popularity has waned, illegal masiao operators now often base their winning numbers on the official ones announced by the PCSO. Other similar games played in Mindanao are "last-two" and "suer-tres". Following a drop on jueteng participation in Pangasinan during 2010, gambling operators shifted to jai alai.

== In popular culture ==
The 2006 film Kubrador by Jeffrey Jeturian centers on an aging bet collector (played by Gina Pareño) who finds her mundane existence suddenly transformed by an unforeseen series of events as she seeks players for the illegal game of jueteng she helps operate. This was based on a real-life kubrador, and female informal settler who moved to the capital and spent 30 years in the industry. This individual provided information to the film's production team, however she did not attend the film's premier for fear of being arrested.

The Tagalog term anak ng jueteng, meaning "son of a gambler", is similar to the English slang "son of a gun".

== See also ==
- Gambling in the Philippines
