= John G. Capers =

American attorney and politician (1866–1919)

The Honorable John G. Capers
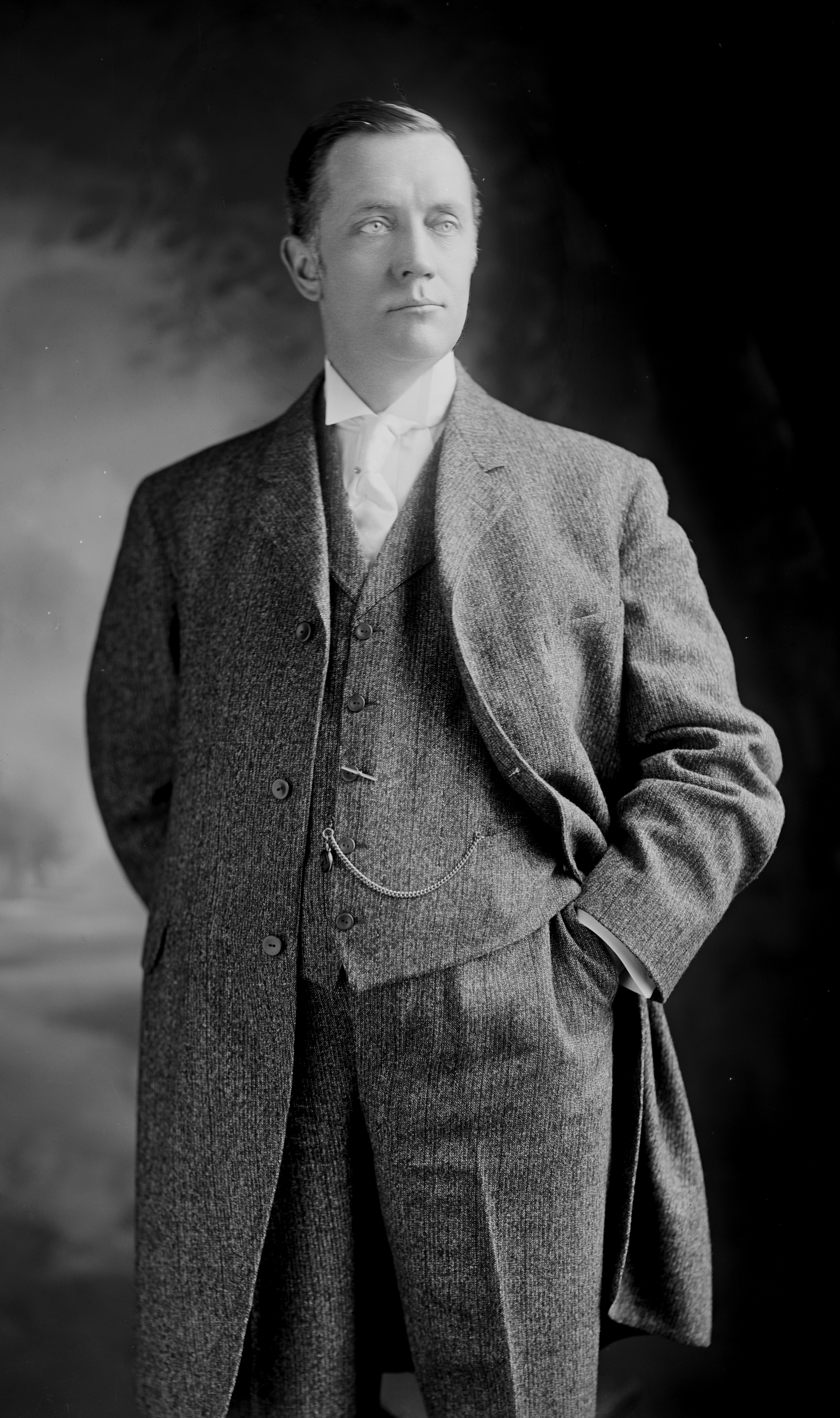
- Photograph of Capers by Harris & Ewing

18th Commissioner of Internal Revenue
- In office June 5, 1907 – August 31, 1909
- President: Theodore Roosevelt
- Preceded by: John W. Yerkes
- Succeeded by: Royal E. Cabell

United States Attorney for the District of South Carolina
- In office 1901–1906
- President: William McKinley; Theodore Roosevelt
- Preceded by: Abial Lathrop
- Succeeded by: Ernest Ford Cochran

Personal details
- Born: John Gendron Palmer Capers; April 17, 1866 Anderson, South Carolina, United States
- Died: September 5, 1919 (aged 53) Washington, D.C., United States
- Party: Democratic (until 1896); Republican (since 1896)
- Domestic partner(s): Susan Keels (m. 1889; died 1890) Lilla Trenholm (m. 1896)
- Relations: William Theodotus Capers (brother); William Capers (paternal grandfather); Francis Marion (maternal ancestor)
- Children: 4
- Parent(s): Ellison Capers; Charlotte Rebecca Palmer
- Education: Patrick Military Institute; Holy Communion Church Institute; The Citadel; Joseph F. Rice School of Law

John Gendron Capers (17 April 1866 – 5 September 1919) was an American journalist, attorney, and politician who served as the 18th Commissioner of Internal Revenue from 1907 to 1909.

== Early life and education ==
John Gendron Palmer Capers (Note: Capers would later omit Palmer in his name) was born in 17 April 1866 in Anderson, South Carolina, to Ellison Capers, the Bishop of South Carolina, and Charlotte Rebecca Palmer. He was the fifth son out of nine siblings, which included his brother, William Theodotus Capers. His ancestry included Methodist Episcopal bishop William Capers as his paternal grandfather and a collateral descendant of Francis Marion by his mother's side.

Capers grew up in Greenville and was said to have an interest in history and biographies when he was a child. He was educated at Professor Mazyck's school in the city, and then at the Patrick Military Institute, and then at the Holy Communion Church Institute (now part of the Porter-Gaud School). He graduated at The Citadel in Charleston in 1885 and received his LL.B. at the Joseph F. Rice School of Law in 1887. He also studied law at the offices of Welles & Orr and former Governor Benjamin Franklin Perry. He was admitted to the bar by the Supreme Court in 1888 and began practicing law that same year.

== Career ==
He was first appointed Superintendent of Education in Greenville County and served that role from 1887 to 1889. Later, He was appointed Captain of Butler's Guards of the 2nd South Carolina Infantry Regiment and made Major of the 1st South Carolina Rifle Regiment. He would then work as a newspaper editor for the Columbia Daily Journal in 1893.

In the early 1894, he left the field of journalism and moved to Washington, D.C. to work as a secretary under Senator Matthew Butler, and later took up law in the city. From 1894, he was appointed Assistant United States Attorney in Washington and served that role until 1901, when he was appointed by President William McKinley to be the United States Attorney for the District of South Carolina with his office located in Charleston. He was reappointed by President Theodore Roosevelt once he got elected into office.

He started campaigning for McKinley and Roosevelt, giving speeches on behalf of both Presidents in Maryland and other southern states. He was also a delegate at-large to the Republican National Conventions in 1904 and 1908. He was also a member of the Republican National Committee for South Carolina from 1904 to 1912.

Being appointed attorney of his native state made him go back to South Carolina in his office. When Ernest Ford Cochran succeeded him as district attorney, Capers took his time by practicing law in his law office at Greenville as well as the one in Washington.

In 1907, Capers returned once again to Washington after being appointed by President Roosevelt as the Commissioner of Internal Revenue upon the resignation of John W. Yerkes in the position. He served in the position until 1909, when he relinquished his position in preference of practicing law. He practiced his profession in Washington and was a member of the bar of the Supreme Court until his death.

In 1919, Newton D. Baker appointed Capers as Major and Judge Advocate General for the newly organized District of Columbia National Guard during World War I.

== Personal life ==
Capers was said to be an ardent Democrat until the election of William Jennings Bryan as the Democratic presidential candidate and his free silver in 1896, when he switched to the Republican Party alongside fellow South Carolinians.

Capers was said to be a Master Mason and a Knight of Pythias. He was a member of the Sigma Alpha Epsilon fraternity and was the President and editor of its newspaper, The Record. He also was a member of the National Press Club, the Commercial Club, the Southern Society, and a member of the Board of Directors of the Chamber of Commerce. He also was said to be a member of the Episcopal Church.

In 1889, Capers married Sue Keels, who died in 1890 due to her frail health. He remarried to Lilla Trenholm of Charleston six years later, the granddaughter of Confederate Secretary George Trenholm, and they had four children together.

== Death ==
Capers death occurred on 5 September 1919, when he was afflicted by a fatal paralysis caused by a stroke. He was 53 years old when he died.
