= Georgia Military Institute =

Military school in Marietta, Georgia (1851–1864)

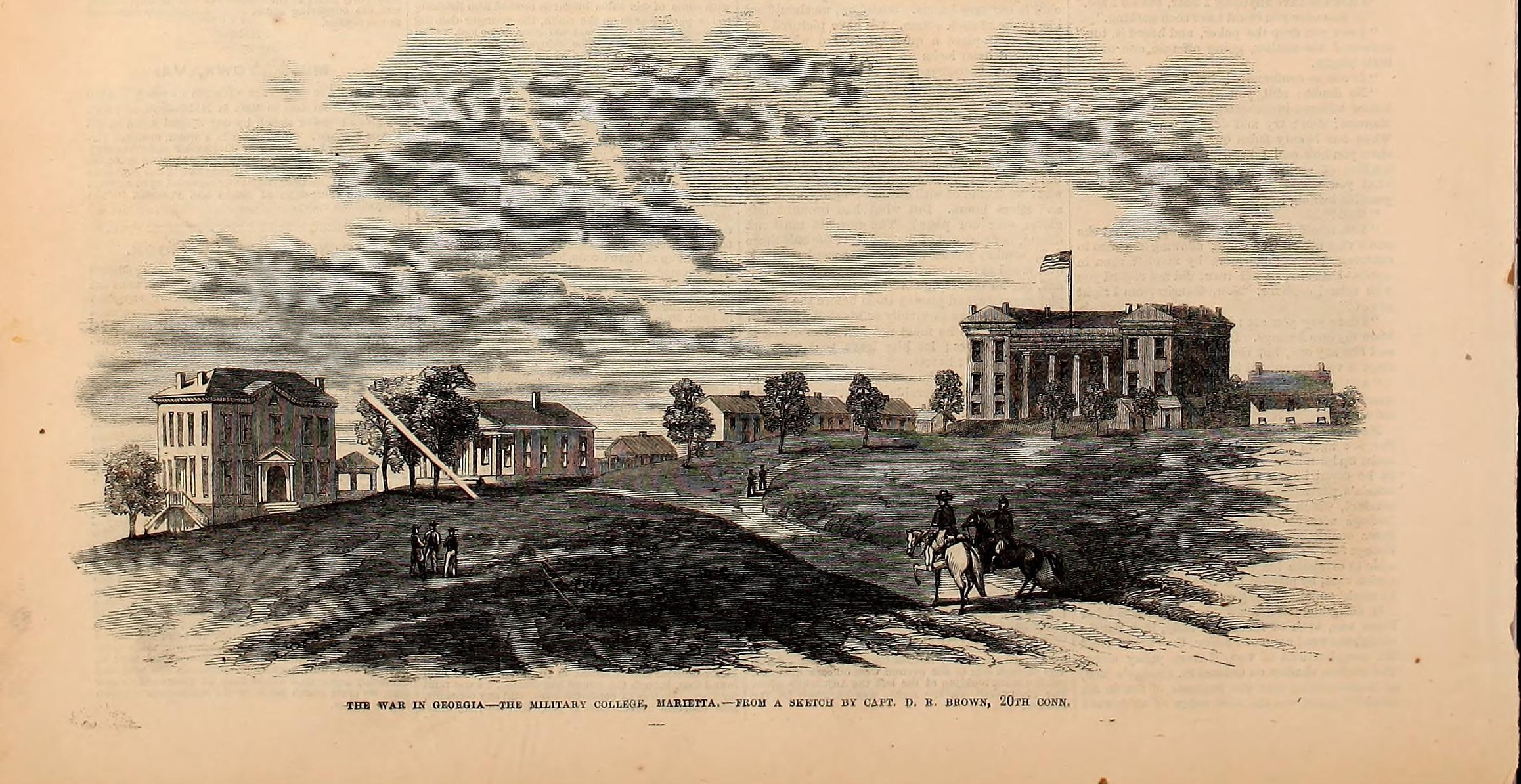
- Sketch of GMI in 1864
- Established: 1851
- Superintendent: Francis W. Capers
- Students: 100-150 cadets
- Location: Marietta, Georgia, United States
- Campus: 110 acres (0.45 km^{2})

The Georgia Military Institute (GMI) was established on 110 acres (0.45 km^{2}) in Marietta, Georgia, United States, on July 1, 1851. It was burned by the Union Army during the Civil War and was never rebuilt.

The current GMI is a reactivation of the name for a Georgia National Guard Officer Candidate School (OCS) curriculum.

== History ==
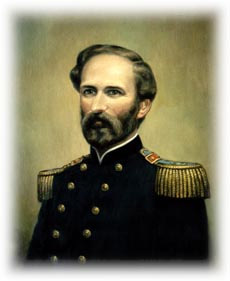
GMI superintendent Francis W. Capers

GMI was established in Marietta on July 1, 1851. The campus consisted of 110 acres (0.45 km^{2}).

Seven students started classes in July and 28 men were in attendance by the end of the first year.

GMI operated regularly until spring 1864 when the cadets were formed into two companies and deployed to West Point, Georgia, as a result of the Civil War.

During the Civil War, superintendent Francis W. Capers sent cadets to use as drill instructors for CSA, and other cadets volunteered or were drafted. On May 14, 1864, GMI cadets fought in the Battle of Resaca and made contact with the 9th Illinois Mounted Infantry regiment. After this single engagement, the cadets were pulled off the front line.

The empty campus was burned by Sherman's troops on November 15, 1864. Following the Civil War, Georgia Military Institute was not rebuilt. In its place was founded North Georgia Agricultural College in Dahlonega, as the Military College of Georgia.

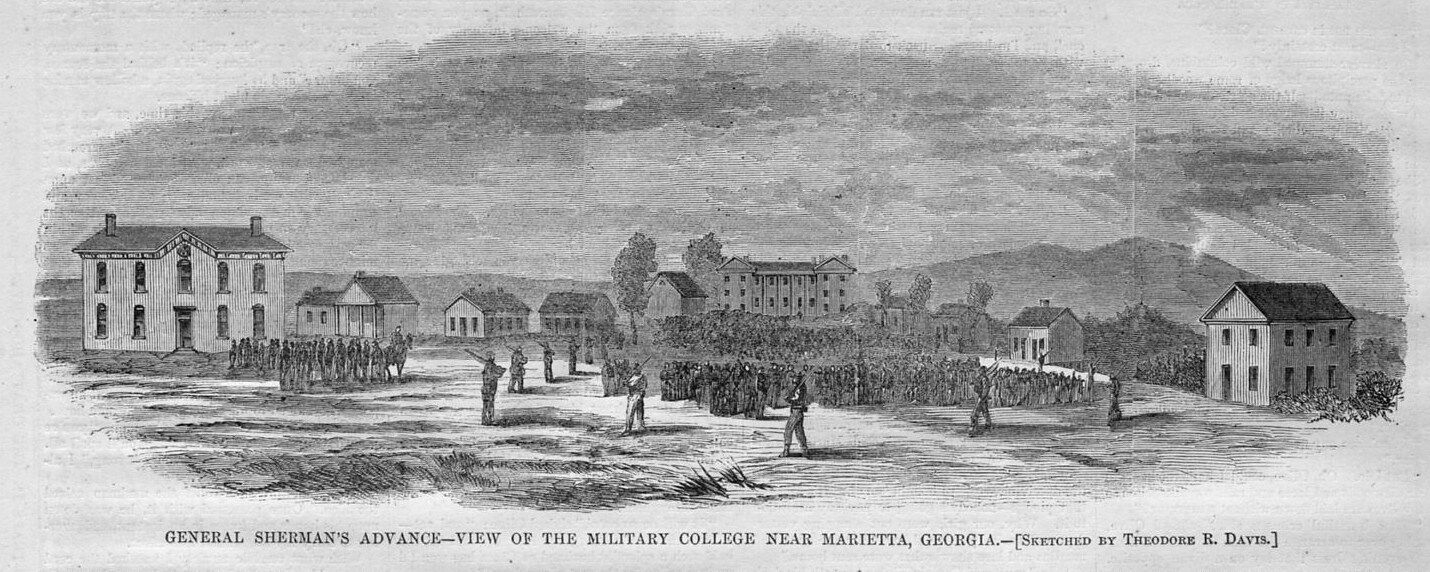
General Sherman's Advance, View of the Military College near Marietta, Georgia, by Theodore R. Davis

To honor the legacy of GMI, the Georgia Army National Guard named its Officer Candidate School after it in 1961. In 2008, GMI returned to Marietta.

In 1891, the Georgia Military Institute was restarted by former GMI cadets. It was located at the intersection of Moreland Drive and Euclid Ave, east of Atlanta. The superintendent was Charles M.Neel, former superintendent of the Moreland Park Military Academy. Its last graduation class was in 1898 and it closed due to finances.

The third GMI was restarted in 1961. Currently it is located at the Clay National Guard Training Center, at Dobbins AFB, in Marietta, Georgia.

== Mission ==
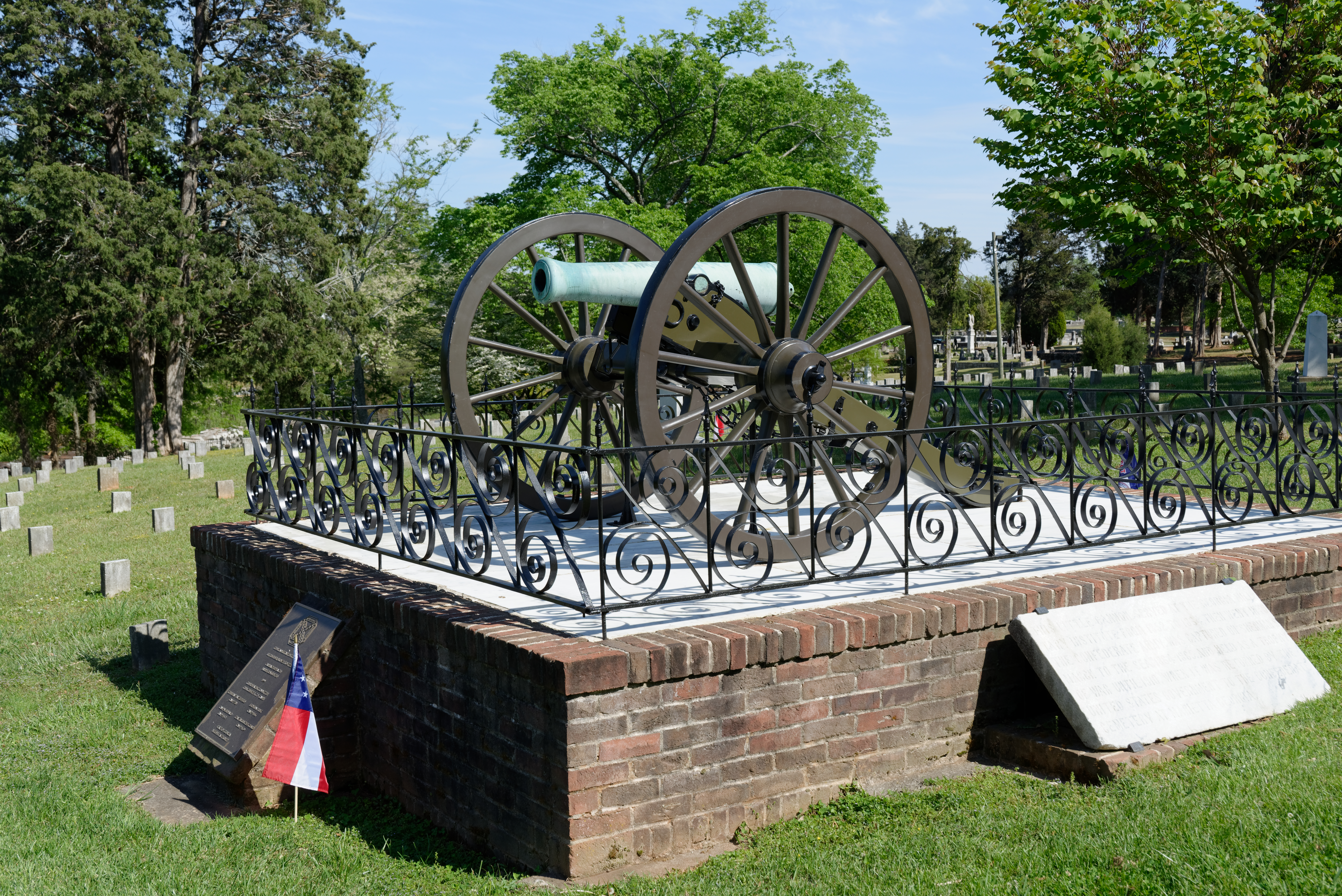
A cannon from GMI, now at the Marietta Confederate Cemetery

In January 2010, the Georgia Army National Guard established its OCS Program at GMI. It is based at the Clay Army National Guard Center (formerly NAS Dobbins) in Marietta at the 122nd Regiment - Regional Training Institute (RTI). GMI/OCS is reflagged as Charlie Company, 2nd Battalion, 122nd RTI under the 78th Troop Command of the Georgia Army National Guard.

Current commissioning programs are available to Army National Guard soldiers in biannual Accelerated and annual Traditional program formats. A GMI graduate will receive both a state and a federally recognized reserve officer commission in the Georgia Army National Guard and US Army, respectively. Coursework is accredited via Fort Benning's US Army OCS curriculum.
