= Richard W. Colcock =

American academic administrator (1806–1856)

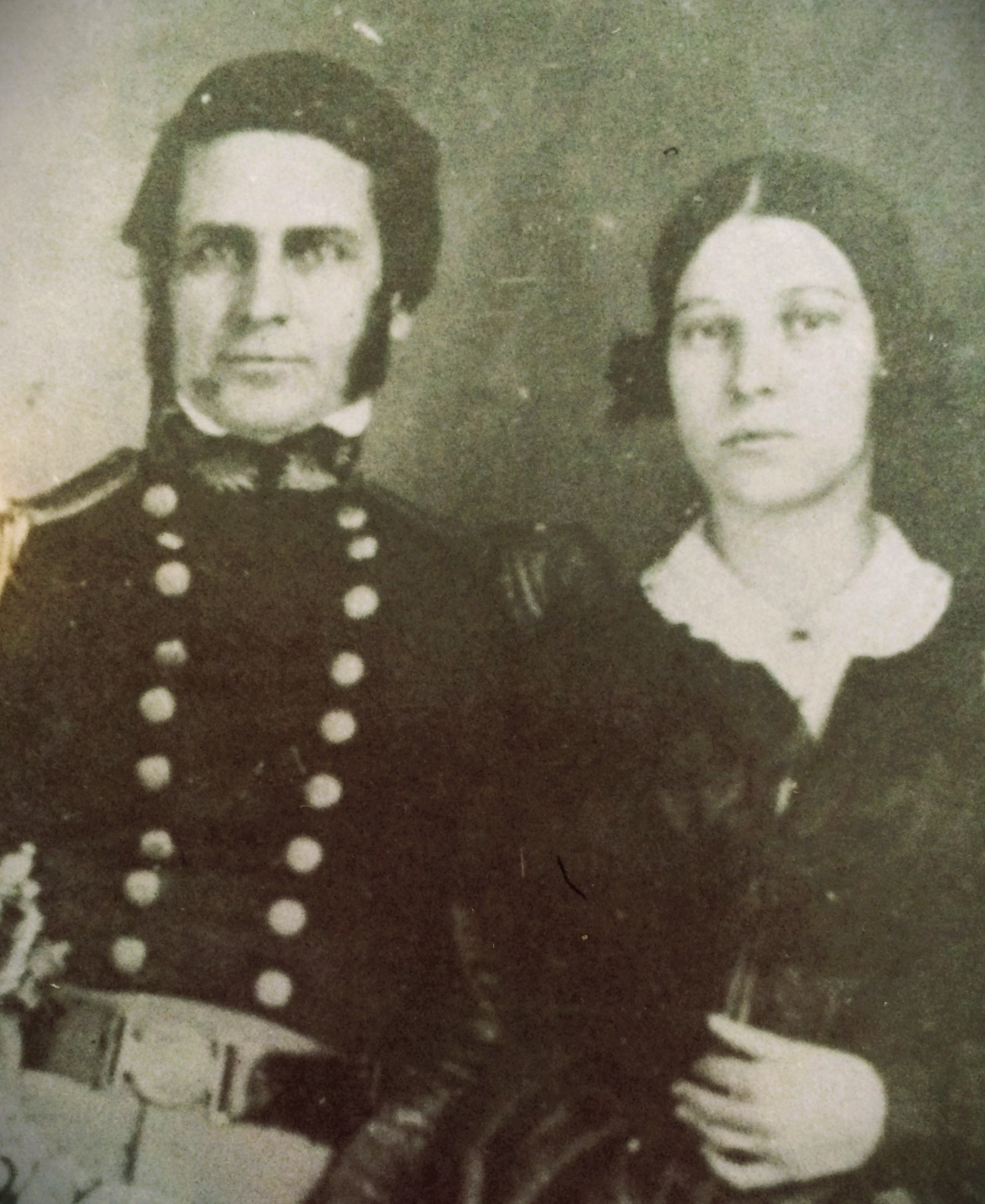
Maj. Richard Woodward Colcock & Mrs. Mellicent Jane Bacot Colcock

Richard Woodward Colcock (June 6, 1806 in Beaufort, South Carolina – January 9, 1856 in Charleston, South Carolina) was the second Superintendent of the South Carolina Military Academy (now The Citadel) from 1844 through 1852.

== Early life and family ==
His father, Charles Jones Colcock, was a prominent South Carolina lawyer and judge who graduated from Princeton College in 1787. As a little boy, Richard's mother, Mary Woodward Colcock, read the Bible and the book Living Christianity to her young children. Richard W. Colcock was educated at home by two private tutors: John Gates Creagh (an 1813 graduate of South Carolina College) and Elijah Gilbert (an 1815 graduate of South Carolina College with first honors).

In 1843, Richard W. Colcock married Mellicent Jane Bacot, daughter of Daniel de Saussure Bacot & Elizabeth Ferguson Bacot, who was the daughter of William Cattell Ferguson & Elizabeth Milner Colcock Ferguson. Their children were: Charles Jones Colcock (married Margaret Stuart), Mary Woodward Colcock, Daniel de Saussure Bacot Colcock (married 1st Augusta Palmer, 2nd Martha Rugeley) Richard Hutson Colcock (married Agnes Stockton), and William Henry Colcock. Maj. Colcock's wife, Mellicent Jane, died in 1851 and he did not remarry. Their graves are in the churchyard at St. Michael's Episcopal Church in Charleston, South Carolina.

== Career ==
=== Army ===
Richard W. Colcock was appointed to the United States Military Academy at West Point in 1822 and graduated in 1826. He was in the sixth class from the academy with the new four-year curriculum developed by Major Sylvanus Thayer. He was the 457th graduate of West Point and finished 26th of 41 graduates from his class. The SCMA Board of Visitors appointed Colcock to assume the duties of Superintendent after the death of Captain Graham in 1844.

Prior to becoming Superintendent, Colcock served for ten years as an infantry officer in the U.S. Army. During eight of his ten years of active duty, he fought in the Indian Wars on the Western frontier and the Seminole War in Florida.

His first assignment after graduation was at Fort Duval, near Silver Springs, Florida. The new territory of Florida, ceded to the United States from Spain in 1821, quickly became a battle ground for a guerrilla war with the Native American tribes of the state. Lieutenant Colcock spent his first two years (1826-1828) at Fort Duval, Fort King, and Cantonment Clinch in Florida.

During his tour in the Florida Territory he was assigned to protect settlers in the newly acquired land. He fought the Seminole Indian Nation during several skirmishes which eventually led to the Second Seminole War (1835-1842). Colcock was reassigned to the "Indian Frontier" in the far west at Jefferson Barracks, Missouri, Fort Leavenworth, Kansas Territory, and on Indian patrol on the Missouri River from 1828-1830. He was assigned to fight the Native Americans in the far west and to protect settlers traveling west during this period. In 1831, Lt Colcock and his infantry company assisted in relocating the Choctaw from their traditional home in Mississippi to Indian Territory (now the state of Oklahoma) in accordance with the Indian Removal Act of 1830. This relocation of thousands of Native Americans was known as the “Trail of Tears”, in which thousands died during the long, hard march to Indian Territory. After his short tour in the “mid-west” he was reassigned to the "north-west" in Iowa Territory.

He served at Fort Atkinson, Iowa Territory and fought in the Black Hawk War from 1831 to 1832 (until the war ended). During these two years, he spent most of his time in the field of battle or pursuing hostile Native Americans. When the Black Hawk War officially ended, he was reassigned to Fort Towson, Indian Territory (Oklahoma) as Quartermaster.

In 1833, he was assigned to the south-west corner of the United States border with Texas at Fort Jesup, Louisiana. From 1834 to 1836, First Lieutenant Colcock returned to West Point as an engineer and as an instructor. During his last year in the U.S. Army, he served as Instructor of Infantry Tactics at West Point. Colcock, spent a grueling 10 years in the U.S. Army with most of his time spent fighting Native Americans on the western frontier and in Florida. Colcock became gravely ill due to the hardships and exposure he endured on frontier duty. He resigned from the Army with effect from April 1, 1836 and returned to his home in Beaufort, South Carolina.

=== South Carolina Military Academy ===
From 1836-1842 he served as Superintendent of Public Works for the State of South Carolina. He was admitted to the Beaufort, South Carolina Bar in December 1842 and served as a lawyer with his brother, William Colcock, just prior to his appointment as Superintendent of the SCMA in 1844. Colonel John P. Thomas (class of 1851) described Colcock as a superintendent that "contributed largely to the development of its fortunes, especially as a school of arms." Colcock was known as a strict disciplinarian. "His disciplinary methods consisted in the steady application of law, carried out in military fashion."

Colcock continued the work that Captain Graham started in 1843-1844. In the first decade of the SCMA existence, the influence of the West Point model was clearly evident. The first two Superintendents were West Pointers and several key staff and professors were also educated at the national military academy. Both Captain Graham and Major Colcock were intimately familiar with West Point's "Thayer System" of instruction. (Major Thayer was known as the "Father of West Point" and established the four-year curriculum that was adapted for The South Carolina Military Academy by Graham and Colcock.)

Colcock succeeded in providing a military education tailored for the citizen soldier. In 1846, the first graduation exercises were held. Six men graduated with Cadet Charles C. Tew as the first honor graduate. Also in that year, the United States declared war on Mexico following several border disputes in Texas. The SCMA trained the South Carolina volunteers of the Palmetto Regiment headed for the Mexican War.

An early supporter of the SCMA and former Governor of South Carolina, Pierce Mason Butler, requested that the Palmetto Regiment be trained at the Citadel Academy in Charleston, one of the 2 schools that made up the SCMA, (the other being the Arsenal Academy in Columbia). Butler, a veteran of the Seminole War in Florida, was appointed Colonel and Commander of the Palmetto Regiment. Major Colcock developed the "Drillmaster" concept to train troops in preparation for war. The faculty, staff, and cadets instructed the Palmetto Regiment in drill, infantry, and artillery tactics prior to their departure for Texas and Mexico. This new and innovative concept was to be used later by The Citadel, VMI, and other southern military colleges to train troops during the Civil War.

The Citadel training followed the Palmetto Regiment to Mexico City where they were the first to raise a U.S. flag over the capitol of Mexico City. The regiment fought side by side with a battalion of U.S. Marines through the "Halls of Montezuma" in Chapultepec and Mexico City. Cadets and graduates of The Citadel performed brilliantly in support of the Mexican War due in large part to the efforts of Colcock and his extensive experience as a combat infantry officer in the U.S. Army and a Military Tactics Instructor at West Point.

The SCMAs post Mexican War years were marked by several improvements in the curriculum and the buildings on the Citadel Academy campus, which were spearheaded by Colcock. In 1849, a third story was added to the barracks to accommodate more cadets. The last major celebration of victory in Mexico occurred on Friday, March 9, 1849 during the visit of President James K. Polk to Charleston. The Citadel Academy also hosted a parade for President James K. Polk during his visit to Charleston. The Citadel and the Citadel Green also served as the site to honor John C. Calhoun, U.S. Senator, U.S. Vice President, and Secretary of War after his death in April 1850. The Citadel Academy and the Corps of Cadets served in the procession as his body was marched from the Citadel Green down King Street, other streets to the Battery, and finally to St Phillip's Church prior to his burial two days later.

In 1852, after more than 8 years as Superintendent, Colcock returned to practicing law and then briefly served in the U.S. Customs prior to his death January 9, 1856. A tough 10-year tour in the U.S. Army followed by eight years at SCMA took a toll. Three cadets that graduated during his administration would later become Superintendent of the South Carolina Military Academy. One of the original faculty officers under his administration (Maj Francis W. Capers) followed him as Superintendent. Colcock was buried with his wife who preceded him, in St. Michael's Episcopal Church (Charleston, South Carolina). He died at 49 years of age.
