= Gun deck =

Deck of a ship used to carry cannons

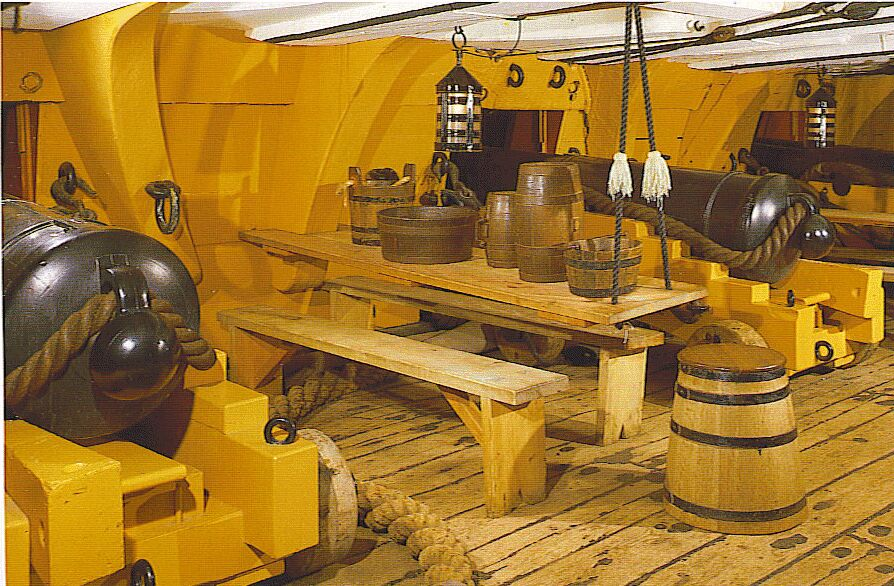
Gun deck of HMS Victory

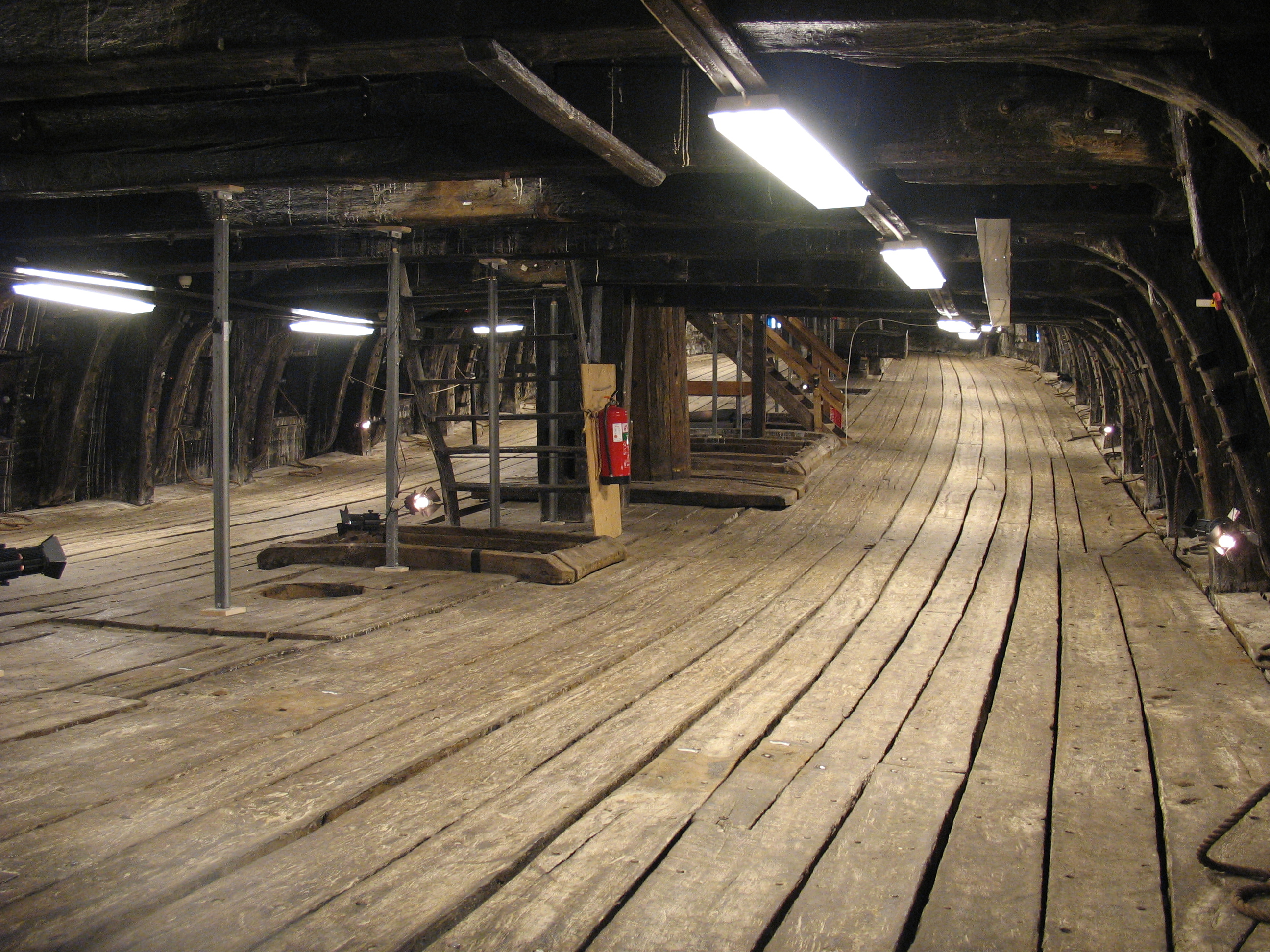
The lower gun deck of the Swedish 17th century warship Vasa looking toward the bow

The term gun deck used to refer to a deck aboard a ship that was primarily used for the mounting of cannon to be fired in broadsides. The term is generally applied to decks enclosed under a roof; smaller and unrated vessels carried their guns on the upper deck, forecastle and quarterdeck, and these were not described as gun decks.

== Slang ==
The term "gun decking" is also naval slang for fabricating or falsifying something. A possible explanation relates to midshipmen retiring to the gun deck to complete their celestial navigation assignments of computing the ship's position three times daily following morning star sights, noon sun line, and evening star sights. While some midshipmen might be conscientious about computing positions from new observations, others were reputed to extrapolate and back calculate observation data from dead reckoning courses and speeds since earlier observations, and the computations performed on the gun deck were suspect.

This term is now used to indicate the falsification of documentation in order to avoid doing the work or make present conditions seem otherwise acceptable.

== See also ==
- Glossary of nautical terms (A-L)
- Son of a gun
