= Tombola (game) =

Southern Italian board game

Tombola (/tɒmˈboʊlə/ tom-BOH-lə, Italian: [ˈtombola]) is a lottery-style board game which originated in Southern Italy. A variation of the game is a popular form of raffle in the UK and elsewhere around the world.

== By region ==
=== Italy ===
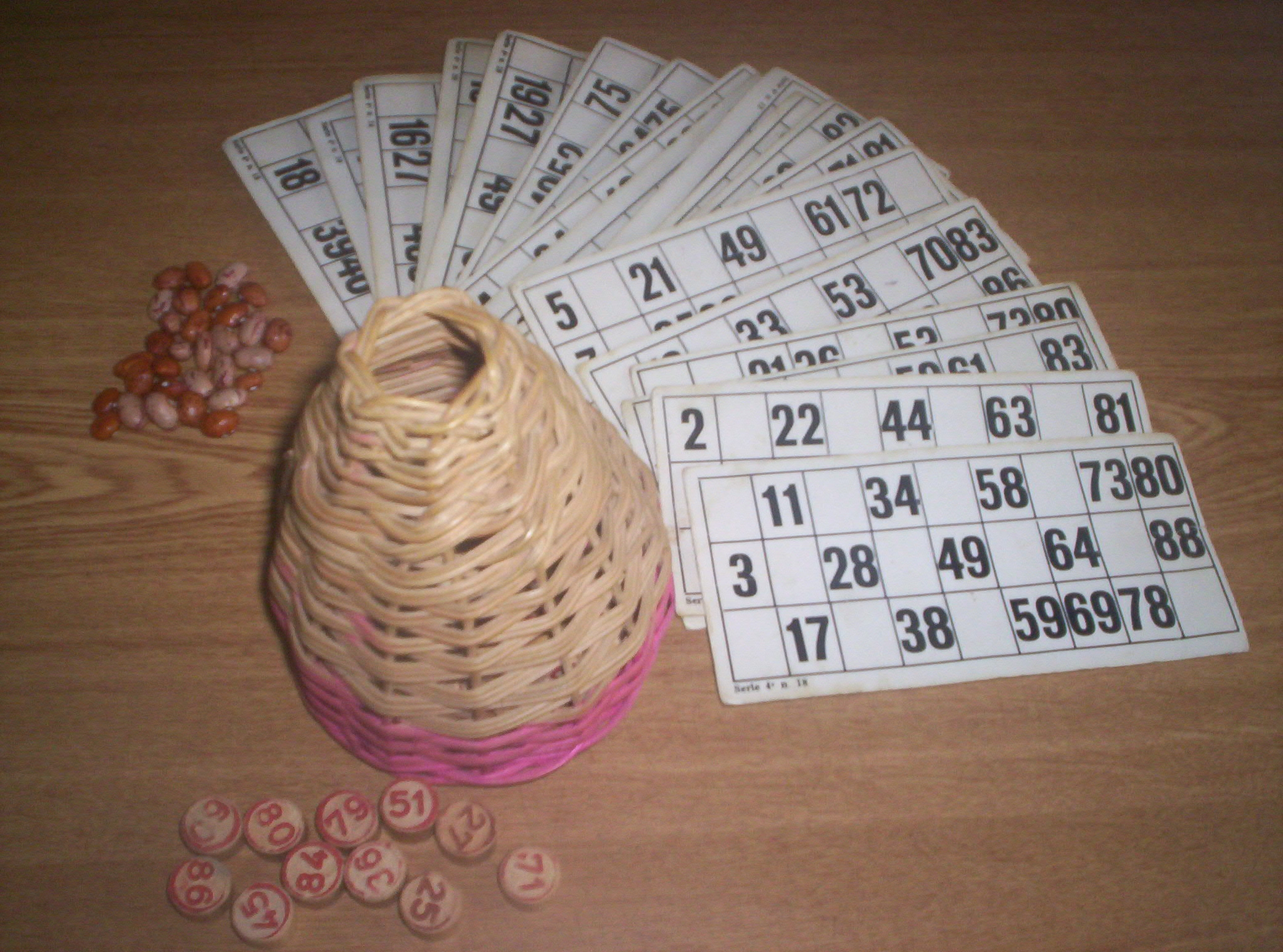
A classic Neapolitan tombola

Tombola is a traditional game played throughout Italy. Neapolitan tombola—today's most popular version—is thought to have originated in 1734 following the new king's decision to tax winnings of the similar game Lotto, then widely-played throughout Naples. Today, tombola is mostly played during Christmas and New Year's Eve, but may also be played during family gatherings such as birthday parties. It is similar to the British version of bingo, but generally less formal, with prizes often being only symbolic or low cash pots. The player will purchase cards based on a fixed cost decided at the start of the game (usually 20c or a similar small coin). Players may buy as many cards as they wish. The money is then divided into 5 prize lots with increasing value:

- Ambo - 2 numbers on a single horizontal row
- Terno - 3 numbers on a single horizontal row
- Quaterna - 4 numbers on a single horizontal row
- Cinquina - 5 numbers on a single horizontal row
- Tombola - the whole card has been filled

The players who reach the above prizes should call them out and collect the lot. Multiple callers for the lot require it to be divided between the winners.

=== India ===
In India, the game is often called as Tambola, although Tombola is the official spelling. Tickets are distributed among the players and the presenter announces the numbers in an exciting way. One by one the players claim the prizes and win either real money (which is decided before starting the game) or a gift.

Prizes that can be claimed while playing Tombola are:

- Early Five: A player can claim early five when he strikes the first five numbers in the ticket.
- Four Corners: To claim Four Corners a player should strike Top Row: 1st & 5th Number; Bottom Row: 1st and 5th Number.
- Top Line: A player can claim top line when all the numbers on first-line are struck in the ticket.
- Middle Line: To claim middle-line a player should have all the middle line numbers struck.
- Bottom Line: To claim bottom-line a player should have all the bottom line numbers struck.
- Pyramid: Just as its name, Top Row: 3rd Number; Middle Row: 2nd, 4th Number; Bottom Row: 1st, 3rd, 5th Number are struck then a player can claim pyramid.
- Center: A player can claim center when the 3rd number of the middle row is being cut.
- Circle: Whosoever 3rd number of the Top Row, 2nd, 4th number of the Middle Row, 3rd number of the Bottom row are struck can claim Circle.
- Breakfast: Numbers in Column 1, 2 and 3. It includes numbers from 1 to 29.
- Lunch: Numbers in Column 4, 5 and 6. It covers numbers from 30 to 59 in a ticket.
- Dinner: Numbers in Column 7, 8 and 9. It covers numbers from 60 to 90 in a ticket.
- Minor: Any number from 1- 49 is included in this.
- Major: Any number from 50-90 is included in this.
- Full-House: Players whose all 15 numbers are cut can claim the winning prize.

=== Peru ===
A variety mostly unique to Peru is the tómbola de cuyes, also simply known as a tómbola. Instead of using a drum, a guinea pig (known locally as a cuy) is let loose in a stage—that may or may not rotate—surrounded by small houses or similar objects until it is startled by its surroundings and hides in the aforementioned items. The winner is the person that drew the correct number.

The game is the origin of the local expression "to be more lost than a cuy in a tómbola" (Spanish: estar más perdido que cuy en tómbola).

=== Philippines ===
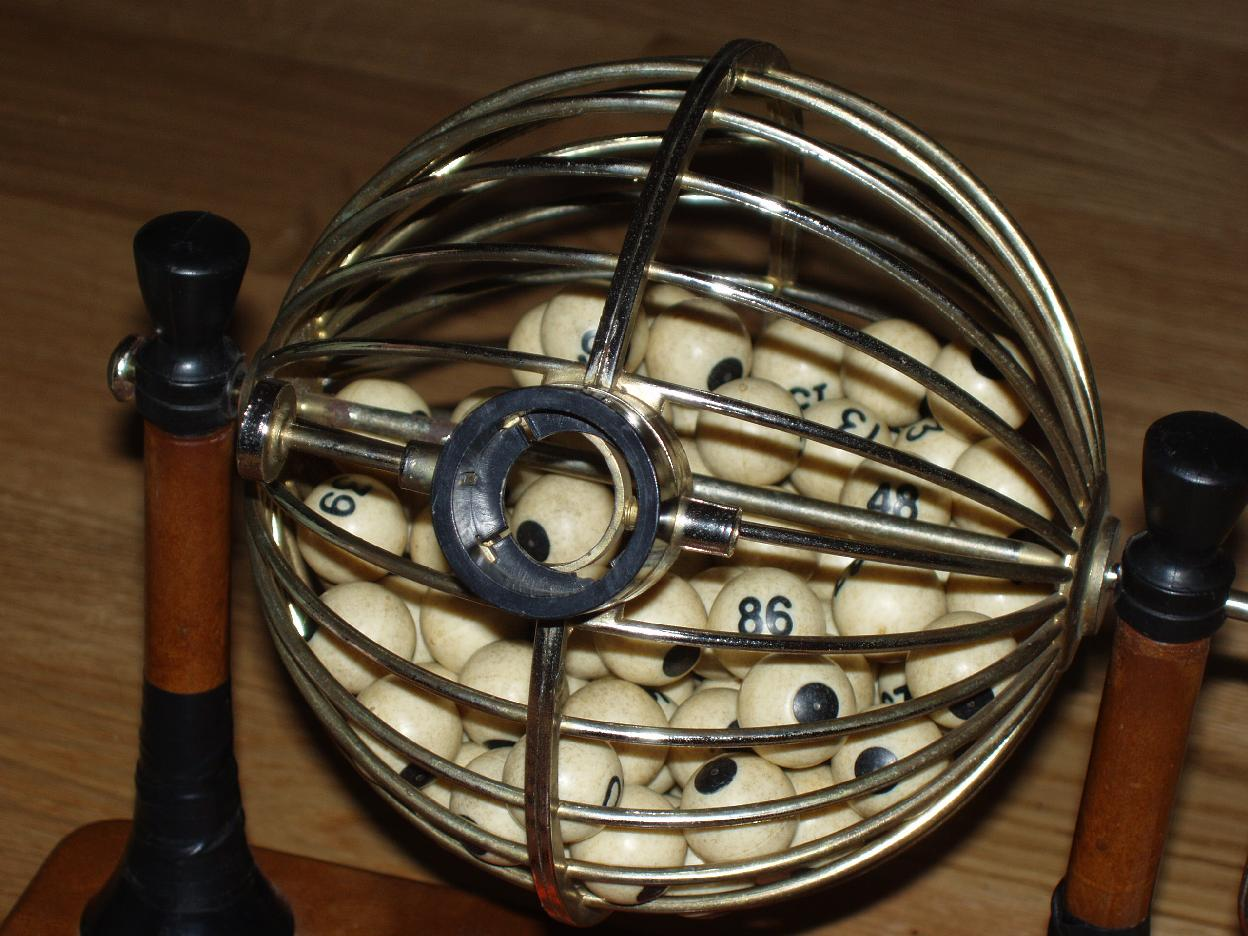
A traditional tambiolo, used for playing jueteng.

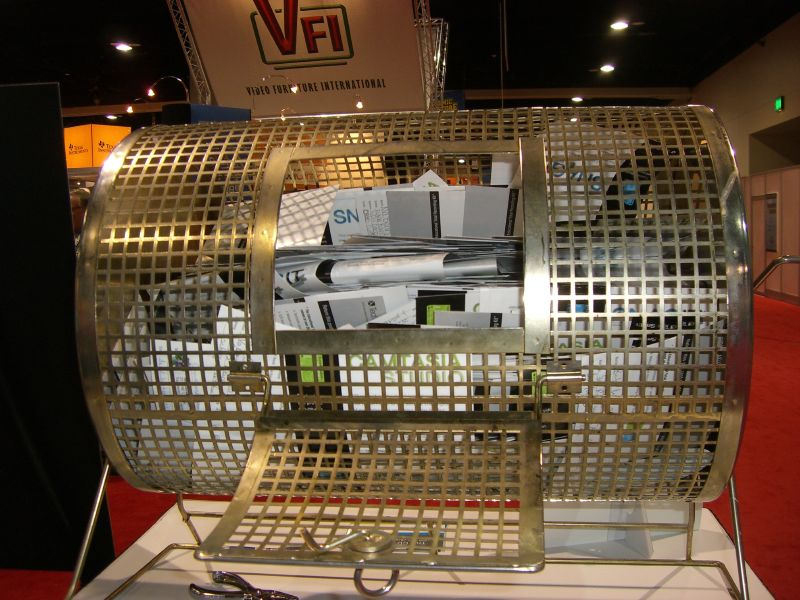
A slightly more modern tambiolo full of raffle tickets.

In the Philippines, it is not called a "tombola", but instead it is known as a "tambiolo" (Filipino/Tagalog: tambiyolo) or sometimes "tambola". It is what one calls the revolving lottery drum where numbered raffle tickets or balls are placed as the tambiolo spins or is manually spun and then, the winning number/s are drawn from it. It is usually used to play jueteng or wahoy or other kinds of raffle games to show to viewers that the lottery game draws randomly to choose a winner.

The numbers game itself is called jueteng or wahoy/wahuy and has been illegal since 1907 in the Philippines during American colonial rule. Both jueteng or wahoy/wahuy are of Hokkien Chinese origin, but the practice of using a revolving tambiolo drum ultimately comes from tómbola through Spanish, but with an -olo Italian suffix. The game of jueteng using a tambiolo drum is most popular throughout Luzon, but wahuy is also played in Sulu. Despite being illegal, the game of jueteng or wahoy is still practiced illegally in secret, which to combat it, the government runs government-regulated and funded lotteries on television and online called "Lotto" under PCSO (Philippine Charity Sweepstakes Office), which also sometimes uses a tambiolo for some of their raffle games.

=== Spain ===
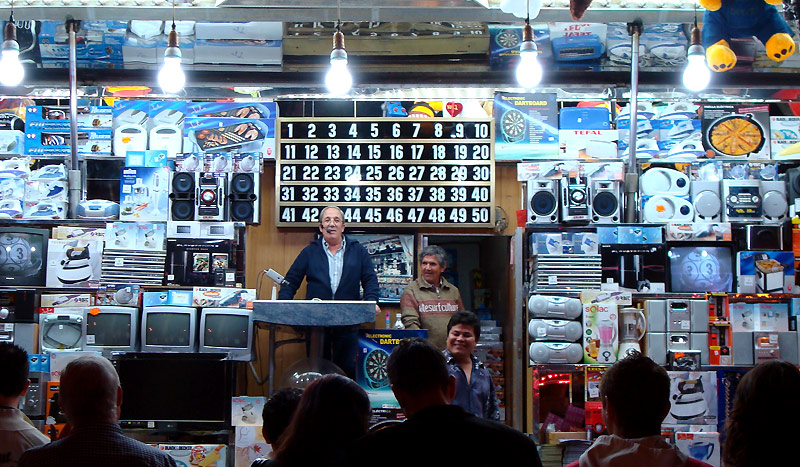
Typical fair or tómbola establishment in a trade fair stall in Madrid, Spain, in which prizes are raffled using a system similar to bingo.

In Spain, it is known in Spanish as "tómbola", which is from Italian: tombola. It is typically a public raffle of various objects, generally as a fair carnival game business or for charitable purposes. It's also what one calls the position or place where a raffle is held and is also what one calls the revolving lottery drum where raffle tickets are drawn from. The carnival game consists of having all the numbers on a previously distributed card or ballot that the clerk, or fairgoer, calls out as a bingo. Then, if it turns out that they have all the numbers on their ticket, the player is rewarded with a prize, which usually ranges, depending on the number of accumulations of points, from stuffed animals to household objects, bicycles, small appliances and various toys.

=== United Kingdom ===
In the United Kingdom, a tombola is a form of raffle in which prizes are pre-assigned to winning tickets. Typically numbered raffle tickets are used, with prizes allocated to all those ending in a particular digit (traditionally a five or a zero). Players pay for a ticket, which they then draw at random from a hat or tombola drum, and can instantly see whether they have won a prize. Tombolas are popular at events such as village fêtes and coffee mornings, when it is expected that not all the players will be present at the end of the event.

=== United States ===
In the United States, fair style fundraisers may have booths with prizes that can be won in a manner similar to UK tombola. Players pay to select a folded paper from a container, and unfold it to determine if—and perhaps what—they have won. Typically, winning tickets will be identified by the ending digits of the number on the paper (for instance, –00). Prizes may be distributed by letting the player make a selection or by proactively marking prizes with the winning numbers.

=== Uruguay ===
In Uruguay, there is also a public raffle lottery called "La Tómbola" sold massively to the public and is regulated by the Ministry of Economy and Finance (MEF) through the Dirección Nacional de Loterías y Quinielas (National Directorate of Lotteries and Pools) (DNLQ).
