= Legrand G. Capers =

American physician

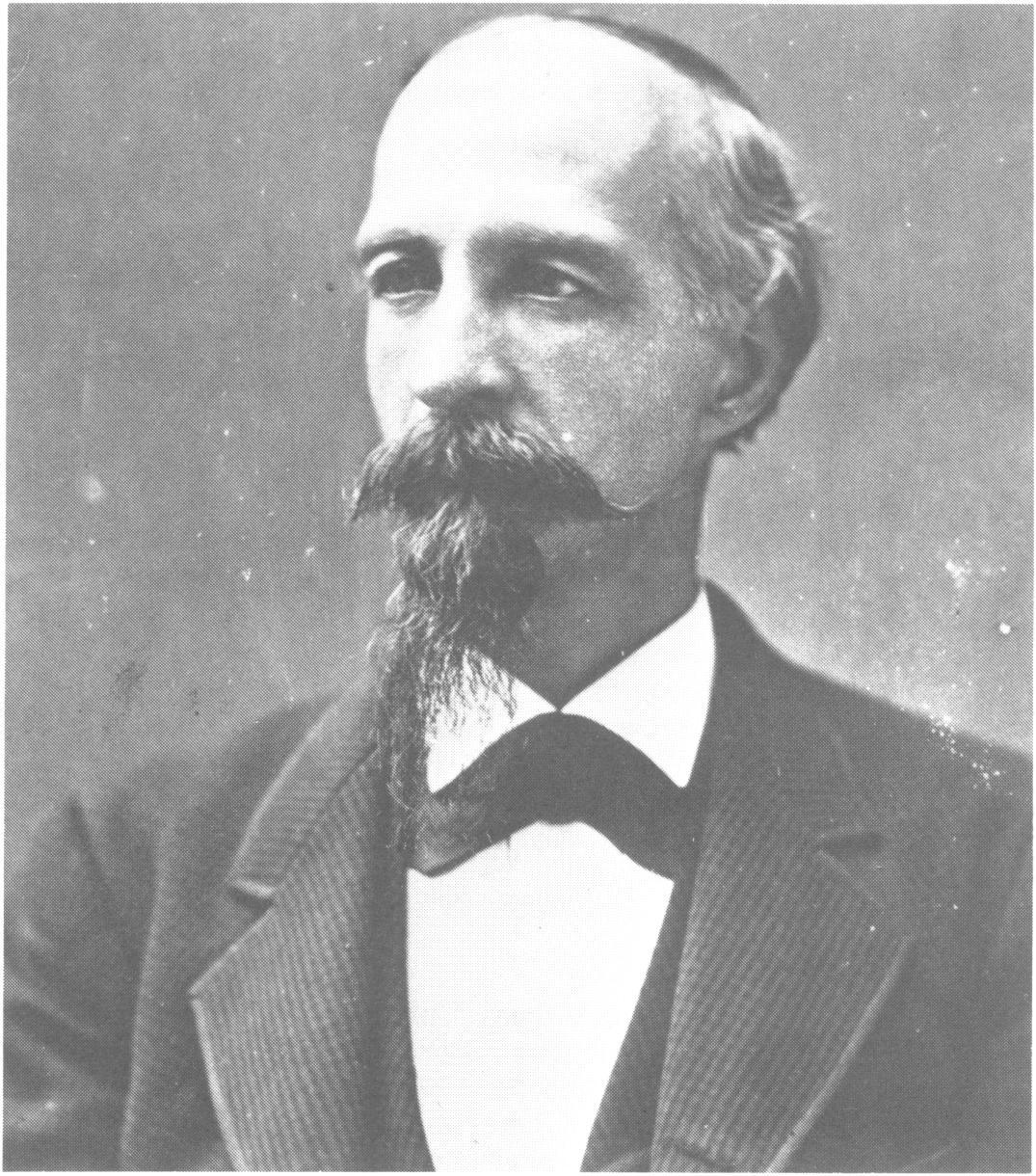
LeGrand G. Capers

Legrand G. Capers (April 16, 1834 – December 2, 1877) was an American medical doctor, best known for his 1874 spurious case report of bullet-mediated impregnation of a young woman.

== Biography ==
Legrand Guerry Capers, Jr. was born on April 16, 1834, in Charleston, South Carolina, as the son of the merchant LeGrand G. Capers (1808–1868) and his first wife, Abigail Swift (1810–1846). LeGrand G. Capers, Sr. served on Gen. Worth's staff during the Mexican–American War.

LeGrand G. Capers, Jr. studied medicine as the assistant to his brother-in-law, Ebenezer Swift, and graduated from Jefferson Medical College. Later he practised as ship physician on Vanderbilt's steamers.

When the American Civil War broke out, Capers participated in the foundation of the Confederate Medical Department in Alabama. On July 19, 1861, he became assistant surgeon in the 4th Georgia Volunteer Infantry. On October 30, 1863, he was promoted to chief surgeon in Cutshaw's battalion.

After the end of the war in 1865, Capers moved to New Orleans and became demonstrator of anatomy in the New Orleans School of Medicine. He fell ill in October 1877 and died shortly after from tuberculosis on December 2. He is buried in Vicksburg. Obituaries appeared in the Transactions of the Mississippi State Medical Association and American Medical Weekly.

== "Bullet pregnancy" ==
The infamous case of "bullet pregnancy" was published in 1874 in The American Medical Weekly. Capers claimed that he witnessed this case eleven years before, while serving in the Confederate army:

On the 12th day of May, 1863, the battle of R. was fought. [...] Our men were fighting nobly, but pressed by superior numbers, had gradually fallen back to within one hundred and fifty yards of the house. My position being near my regiment, suddenly I beheld a noble, gallant young friend staggering closer, and then fall to the earth. In the same moment a piercing scream from the house reached my ear! I was soon by the side of the young man, and, upon examination, found a compound fracture, with extensive comminution of the left tibia; the ball having ricochetted from these parts, and, in its onward flight, passed through the scrotum, carrying away the left testicle. Scarcely had I finished dressing the wounds of this poor fellow, when the estimable matron came running to me in the greatest distress, begging me to go to one of her daughters, who, she informed me, had been badly wounded a few minutes before. Hastening to the house, I found that the eldest of the young ladies had indeed received a most serious wound. A minnie ball had penetrated the left abdominal parietes, about midway between the umbilicus and anterior spinal process of the ilium, and was lost in the abdominal cavity, leaving a ragged wound behind. Believing there was little or no hope of her recovery, I had only time to prescribe an anodyne, when our army fell back, leaving both field and village in the hands of the enemy. [...] About six months after her recovery, the movements of our army brought me again to the village of R., and I was again sent for to see the young lady. She appeared in excellent health and spirits, but her abdomen had become enormously enlarged, so much so as to resemble pregnancy at the seventh or eighth month. Indeed, had I not known the family and the facts of the abdominal wound, I should have so pronounced the case. Under the above circumstances, I failed to give a positive diagnosis, determining to keep the case under surveillance. [...] Just two hundred and seventy-eight days from the date of the receipt of the wound by the minnie ball, I delivered this same young lady of a fine boy, weighing eight pounds. [...] About three weeks from the date of this remarkable birth, I was called to see the child, the grandmother insisting there was "something wrong about the genitals." Examination revealed an enlarged, swollen, sensitive scrotum, containing on the right side a hard, roughened substance, evidently foreign. I decided upon operating for its removal at once, and in so doing, extracted from the scrotum a minnie ball, mashed and battered as if it had met in its flight some hard, unyielding substance.

An editor's note in a subsequent issue of the journal revealed the case to be a joke:

DR. L.G. CAPERS, of Vicksburg, Miss., disclaims responsibility for the truth of that remarkable case of impregnation by a minnie ball, as reported in No. 19 of this Journal. He tells the story as it was told to him. He does not say it is untrue, but is disposed to appositely remember the truth of the old adage, that "accidents may happen in the best regulated families." The joke is, that the Doctor reported the case without any signature, but as the editor is indisposed to be made the victim of canards, and recognized the writing sent, he was unwilling to deprive the author of the contemplated fun, and allowed him to enjoy even more of this than was anticipated. The readers have enjoyed the story much, but not enough "to cut capers" after reading it.

== See also ==
- Son of a gun
