= Washington Street United Methodist Church =

Historic church in South Carolina, United States

- U.S. National Register of Historic Places
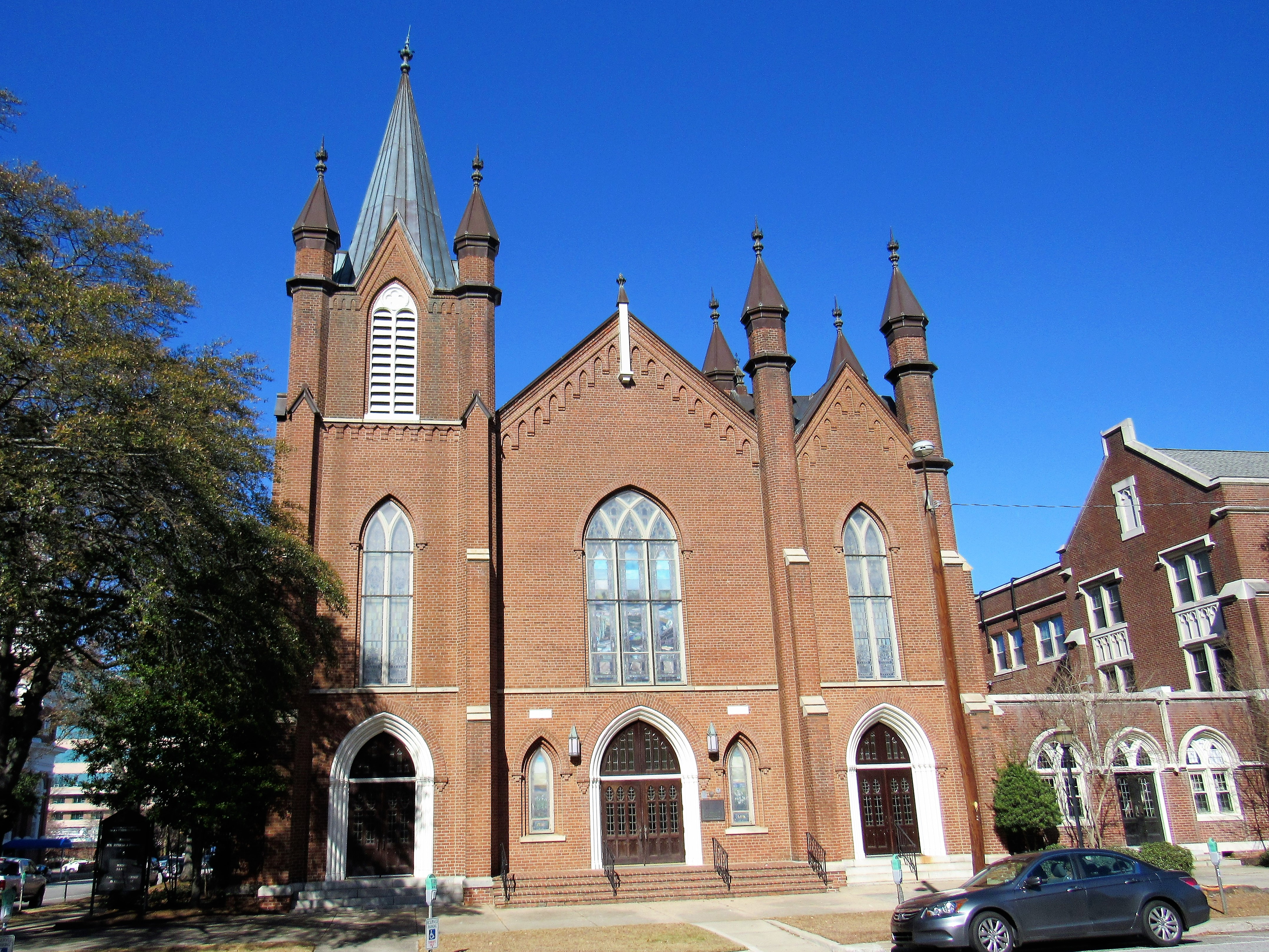

- Location within South Carolina Location within the United States
- Location: 1401 Washington St. Columbia, South Carolina
- Coordinates: 34°0′19″N 81°1′53″W
- Area: 3 acres (1.2 ha)
- Built: 1872
- Architectural style: Gothic Revival
- NRHP reference No.: 70000599
- Added to NRHP: December 18, 1970

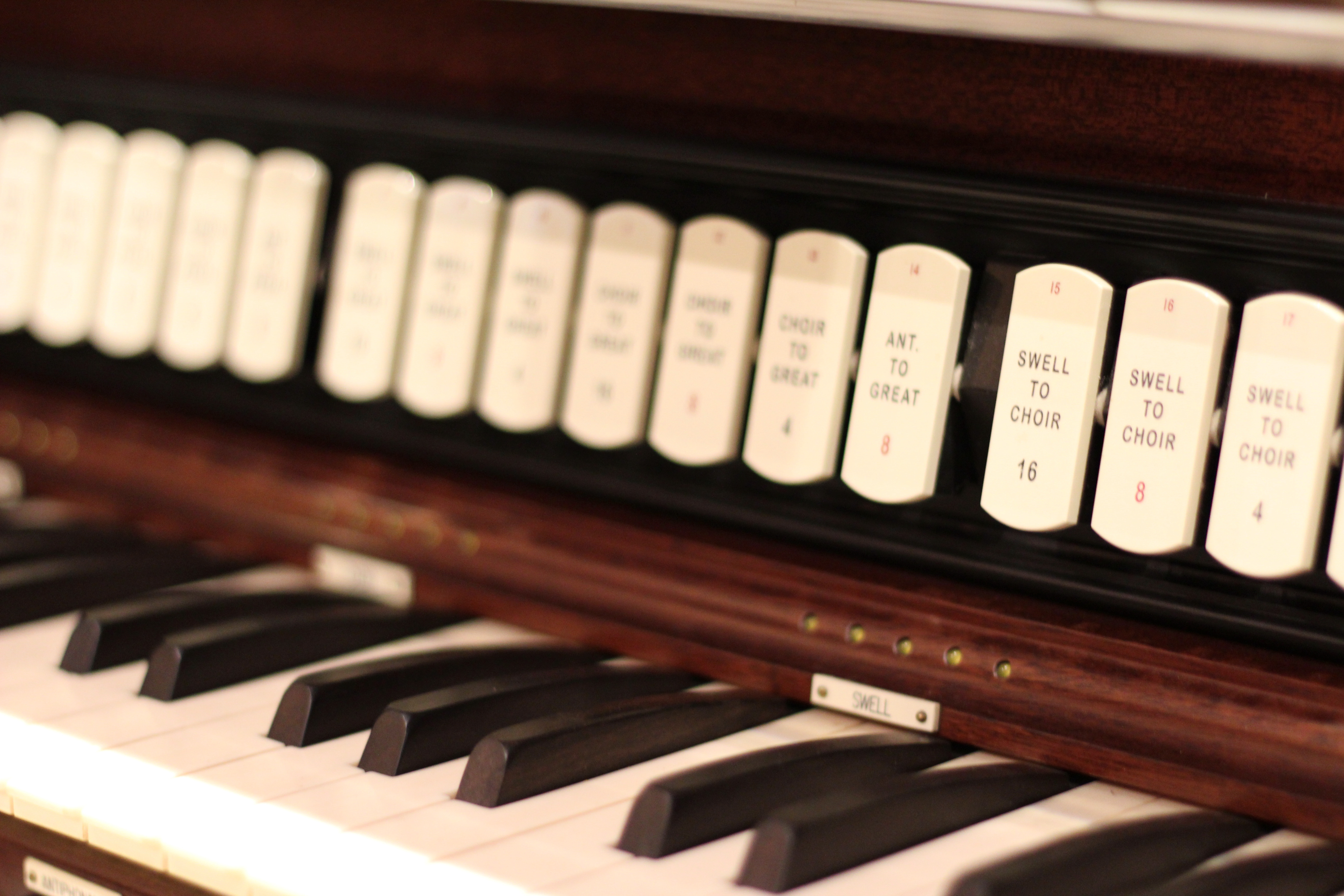
1920s Pipe Organ; Washington Street UMC, Columbia, SC

The Washington Street United Methodist Church is a historic church at 1401 Washington Street in Columbia, South Carolina.

It was built in 1872 and added to the National Register in 1970.

== History ==
On December 15, 1803 John Harper and a small number of Methodists in Columbia decided to build a church on the corner of Washington and Marion streets. The following year, a church building was erected and congregations have been worshiping at the site ever since.

The first building was a plain wooden structure, which was completed in 1804. That building stood where the present sanctuary stands today. It was the first church building to be constructed in Columbia. Because several Methodist churches have sprung from its founding, Washington Street has been called the “Mother Church” of Methodism in Columbia. The Reverend John Harper, the founder of the church, was ordained by John Wesley, and Bishop Francis Asbury visited and shepherded the young congregation until his death in 1815.

A young William Capers was appointed pastor of Washington Street Church in 1818 and was reappointed to Washington Street Church in 1831, 1835, and 1846 and was consecrated bishop in 1846. In 1829 at the urging of Charles Cotesworth Pinckney, a prominent planter, Capers founded the Methodist Episcopal Church's mission to slaves and served as the mission's first superintendent. He was one of four Washington Street pastors to become a bishop. He lies buried beneath the altar of the sanctuary.

Twenty-seven years after the first small church was built, a wave of religious enthusiasm dictated the need for a larger building to accommodate the crowds attending services. The cornerstone for a substantial brick building was laid at the same site as the previous smaller church on June 14, 1831. That building was destroyed by fire on February 17–18, 1865, when the troops of General William T. Sherman captured and burned Columbia. According to legend, the Union troops were looking for the First Baptist Church, original site of the secession convention, and were directed to Washington Street Church by the Baptist sexton. A small, temporary church with a seating capacity of 400 was constructed in 1866 from brick salvaged from the burned church.

The Reverend William Martin, who once served as a pastor of Washington Street Church and whose family played an important role in the city of Columbia during and after the Civil War, traveled throughout the South and in the North as far as Philadelphia, New York, and Buffalo, telling Washington Street's story and soliciting funds for its rebuilding. The fourth and current building, constructed from a Gothic Revival design was dedicated on June 20, 1875.

== Architecture ==
A stained-glass window with a cross and crown motif is a memorial to the Reverend William Martin. That window was placed in an alcove high above the pulpit in 1900. Another window portraying Christ in the Temple is located in the Leavitt Choir Room, formerly part of the 1901 Sunday school building. Windows depicting the life of Christ with no human figures line the walls of the sanctuary. These windows were dedicated on Easter Sunday 1914.

Music for services is provided by a E.M. Skinner organ located in the choir loft. This instrument was obtained through the efforts of D.A. Pressley, long-time organist and director of music. The organ was completed in February 1922.

A Sunday school building was added in 1928. The 1959 addition includes Christ Chapel, Threatt Fellowship Hall, and a kitchen. Christ Chapel was dedicated during Holy Week of 1960. The windows of Christ Chapel depict the life of Christ, his humanity and his divinity. The Rose Window on the back wall contains the “I am” sayings from the Book of John. Panels by Jean McWhorter depict the church year. The Christ Chapel courtyard was dedicated in 1998. The courtyard contains several plantings: variegated elaeagnus from John Wesley's London Chapel, ivy from the Wesley parsonage at Epworth, and ten miniature boxwoods from the original stock planted at George Washington's home at Mount Vernon in 1798.

The courtyard between the education building and the sanctuary was renovated during 2003. The courtyard is a memorial garden and contains a columbarium with 36 niches for the interment of cremated remains. Graves in this garden go back to the early 1800s. In the garden is the tombstone of William Maxwell Martin, the son of the Rev. William Martin. Many historical accounts claim that he was the first casualty of the Civil War. The tombstone appears to be broken, but actually it was left “unfinished,” symbolizing his death at an early age. A fragment of stone is mounted on the wall. This fragment is part of a tablet that was placed in the church in 1857 along with two other memorial tablets and is part of the Rev. William M. Kennedy's tablet. It is all that was left after the burning of the church in February 1865.

In the 1980s the church began a soup cellar to serve the many needy homeless people in Columbia, and a Children's Development Center to serve preschoolers was started.

A Children's Library on the second floor of the education building was opened on May 21, 2000. The library provides children with books and other reading materials. There are over 1200 books currently available in the library. A stained glass window shows Jesus with the little children. It was given in honor of Washington Street member Nan Self, who has dedicated her life to the education of children, both in public school and at Washington Street. The animal furniture and other child-related items add to the ambience of the room.

The McDonald Library was moved to the second floor in 2004. This library supports the educational programs of the church. The collection contains over 1500 books on theology, Bible study, philosophy and ethics, church history, and biographies of famous theologians and other religious persons. In addition to the libraries, an improved History and Archives Room was set up on the third floor. The room is temperature controlled and items are alphabetically filed by category. Washington Street United Methodist Church is one of only two churches in the South Carolina Conference to receive the Herbert A. Hucks award twice. These awards were given to the church for its efforts in the preservation of history. A museum in which artifacts are displayed is located just outside the Archives and History Room. A chair once owned by Bishop William Capers is a featured item on display. Two new classrooms now occupy the former senior minister's study and McDonald Library space.

The music ministry continues to be an important activity at Washington Street United Methodist Church. A new Steinway grand piano was purchased for the sanctuary in 2007 and the E.M. Skinner organ was refurbished and dedicated as the Ralph R. Rozier E.M. Skinner organ in 2008.

== Leadership ==
Washington Street Church has been served by four bishops: James O. Andrew, William Capers, A. Coke Smith, and J. O. Smith. Over the years, the clergy and lay members have pioneered in the fields of Christian education, missions, and social service.
