= William Capers =

American bishop (1790–1855)

The Right Reverend Henry Capers D.D.
- Bishop of the Methodist Episcopal Church, South
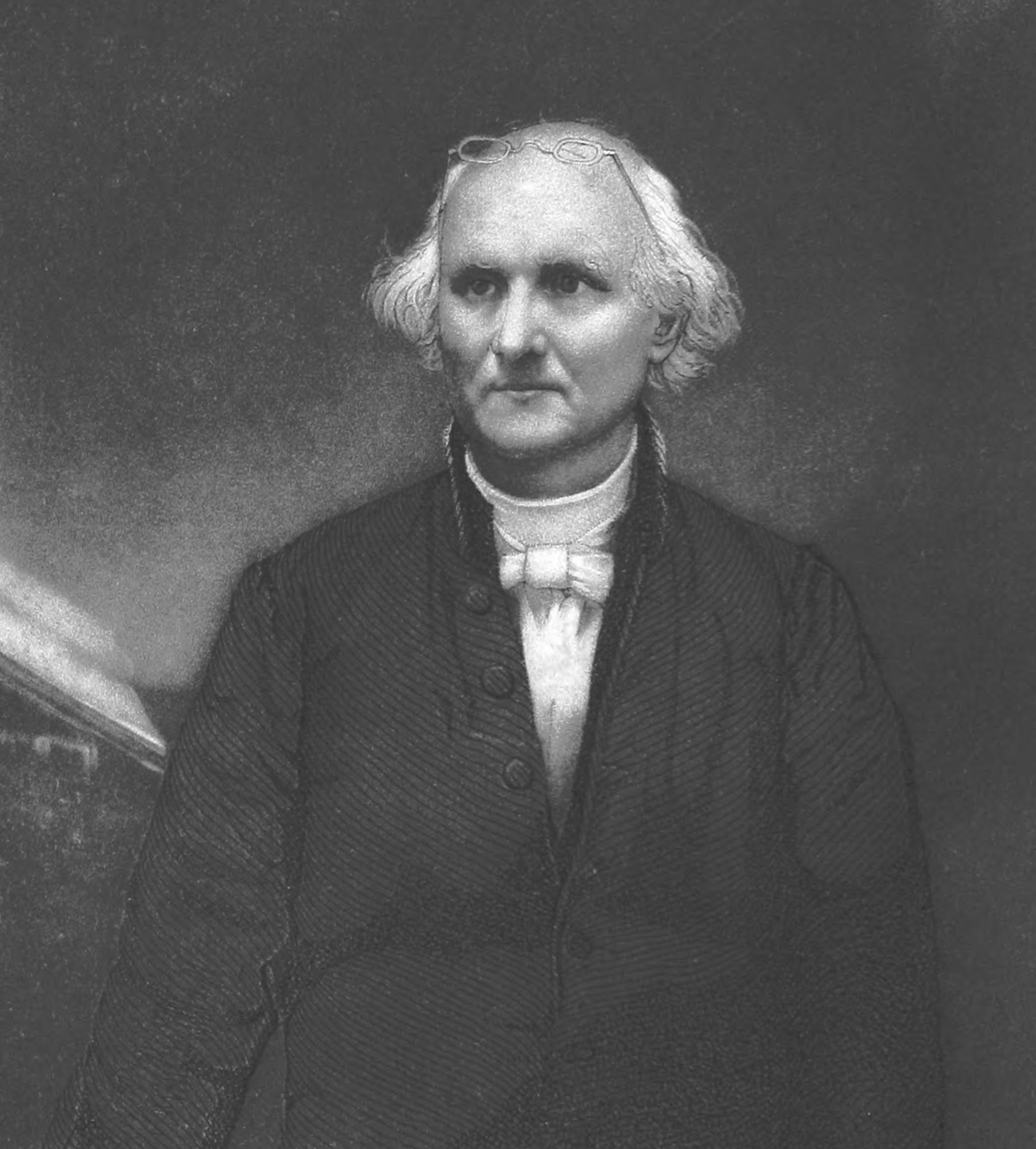
- Church: Methodist Episcopal Church; Methodist Episcopal Church, South

Orders
- Ordination: December 22, 1810 (deacon); December 26, 1812 (presiding elder) by Francis Asbury
- Consecration: May 14, 1845 by James Osgood Andrew

Personal details
- Born: January 26, 1790 St. Thomas Parish, near Charleston, South Carolina, United States
- Died: January 29, 1855 (aged 65) Anderson, South Carolina, United States
- Buried: Washington Street United Methodist Church
- Spouse: Anna White (m. 1813; died 1815) Susan McGill (m. 1816)
- Children: 11, including Francis and Ellison
- Occupation: clergyman

William Capers (26 January 1790 – 29 January 1855) was an American Methodist clergyman, missionary, and editor for the Wesleyan Journal, once part of the Christian Advocate. He served as one of the first bishops of the Methodist Episcopal Church, South from 1845 until he died in 1855.

== Early life and education ==
William Capers was born on 20 January 1790 at Bull-Head Swamp, a plantation in St. Thomas Parish near Charleston, South Carolina, the fourth son out of 12 children. His father was rice plantation owner William Capers, a brigade major who served in the American Revolutionary War, and his mother was Mary Singeltary, who died when he was two years old, both of whom were first converts of Methodism in South Carolina.

In 1793, the older William married Mary Wragg, after which he disposed of his estate, purchased a plantation in Sandy Island between the Waccamaw and Black Rivers, and moved to Georgetown. He had also purchased another plantation near Georgetown and called it Belle Vue, where the younger William lived in 1796.

In 1798, after one of his sisters had died from a disease, the older William gave up Belle Vue and resided in Georgetown with rest of his family in 1799. They then moved to another plantation named Woodland in Sumter.

In 1800, the younger William was educated at William Hammett's school in Georgetown. He was then educated at Roberts' Academy in Statesburg. In 1805, he was admitted to the University of South Carolina, but left in 1808 before graduation, when he was a sophomore, and began to study law under Judge John S. Richardson in his home.

== Career ==
In August 1808, he was converted into a Methodist and joined the Methodist Episcopal Church during one of the Sabbath days. He was then licensed to preach with the approval of Bishop Francis Asbury in 25 November after accompanying Reverend William Gassaway and helping with the exhortation on his preachings around the Santee Circuit, from Chesterfield to near the Santee River. Other preachers objected to the idea of Capers' admission due to not being fully connected to the church's membership, but was overruled by Bishops Asbury and McKendree. He was also recommended by Gassaway to the South Carolina Conference on trial in the itinerancy.

The South Carolina Conference of 1809 was held in Liberty Chapel in Greene County, Georgia, where Capers was admitted as an itinerant minister appointed to the Wateree Circuit, from the west side of the Wateree River to Camden, and had set out on 7 January. In December, he was appointed to preach around Pee Dee Circuit, from Georgetown to the opposite side of the Darlington Courthouse.

During the second Quarterly Meeting of the preachers in June 1810, Capers was then removed from the circuit and relocated at Fayetteville to North Carolina. He attended another conference on 22 December, where he was ordained a deacon and joined as a full member of the church. He was then appointed to Charleston to preach there, and in 1812 was appointed to the Orangeburg Circuit, tasked to preach in between the fork of the Edisto River and places between the north fork and Beaver Creek.

He was ordained Presiding Elder by Bishop McKendree during a Conference held in Charleston on 26 December 1812, and was appointed in Wilmington, North Carolina. In 1813, Capers married Anna White and had two children together before she died in 1815. He remarried in 1816 to Susan McGill.

Following a session in 1821, Capers was selected by Bishop McKendree as a missionary to preach the gospel to the Creek Indians in Georgia and gave the first missionary lecture in the Creek Nation. In October, he made a second visit to the Muscogees. The next year, Capers founded the Asbury Mission to the Creek Indians (renamed to the Asbury Manual Labor School), following negotiations with the local chiefs, and served as its superintendent up until 1824. During his time as superintendent, Capers resided in Milledgeville, where he spent his Sundays doing sermons at the Georgia Penitentiary.

Capers later moved to Charleston to visit the South Carolina Conference in 1825 and was charged to replace Stephen Olin in editing the Wesleyan Journal, the second Methodist paper published in the United States at that time. In September 1826, the Christian Advocate of New York and the Wesleyan Journal merged into the Christian Advocate and Journal and Zion's Herald, later dropping Zion's Herald from the title in 1833. Capers continued to serve as the editor of the new publication from 1836 to 1840, continuing his work as Presiding Elder in the Charleston District.

During the 1827 General Conference, after Bishop Joshua Soule delivered a sermon on The Perfect Law of Liberty, the conference requested Capers for the publication of the sermon. While in publication, Presbyterians from the Charleston Observer reviewed these articles and convicted Soule of heresy. Capers, alongside Bishop James Osgood Andrew, responded to those claims by publishing a pamphlet containing six letters to the editor of the publication, attacking the person in charge of publishing the review.

In the 1828 General Conference, he agreed to be the representative of the American Methodist Church to Great Britain. He soon embarked for the coast of Ireland and then to Anglesey, and then stopped at Liverpool, where he then moved to London, during which he preached to the people in the cities. The British Conference opened on 30 July in City Road Chapel, where Capers received acknowledgements as the representative of the Church of America. On 26 August, he left London and went back of America and resumed his duties as Presiding Elder in 1828.

The Southern part of the Methodist Church established two missions to plantation slaves in 1829, where Capers was appointed superintendent of both missions alongside his work as Presiding Elder. During this time, Capers published the Catechisms for the Negro Missions in 1833, a catechism for the oral instruction of slaves.

In November 1829, he was elected as the Professor of Moral Philosophy and Belles Lettres at Franklin College in Georgia, but declined the offer. Augusta College in Kentucky gave him a Doctor of Divinity during that same time, but Capers had been silent about it. He had also declined several more offers from Southern Colleges, as well as the Chair of Evidences of Christianity at the University of South Carolina.

In 1831, Capers served the Washington Street United Methodist Church on four separate occasions: in 1818, 1831, 1835, and 1845. He let the construction of a new structure at the church and assisted in the laying of the cornerstone for the new building in 1831.

From 1837 up until 1840, he also worked as an editor for the Southern Christian Advocate. At the 1840 conference, he was appointed secretary of the Southern Missionary Department of the Church from 1840 to 1844, and extended the mission to plantation slaves into every southern U.S. state. As a result, the eighty missionaries under his supervision for more than 22,000 slave members.

The General Conference of 1844 saw the Eastern and Northern portions of the Episcopal Church vying for the abolition of slavery, in which the Church split up into the Methodist Protestant Church and the Methodist Episcopal Church, South, during which Capers defended Bishop Andrew over his ownership of slaves.

At the end of 1845, Capers was stationed at Columbia, revising his catechism and adding a second part to the book. In 1846, he entered the first General Conference of MEC, S, where he and Robert Paine were elected the first bishops of the church on 7 May and were been consecrated on 14 May. He maintained a residence in Anderson. He served as bishop until his death on 29 January 1855 due to heart disease. He was then interned and buried at Washington Street United Methodist Church in 2 February.

== Personal life ==
In 1813, Capers married Anna White and had two children together, Anna and Theodotus, before her death in 1815. He remarried again in 1816 to Susan McGill. Capers and McGill had nine children together. Those were:

- Francis Asbury Capers, died young
- Francis Withers Capers, Confederate militia officer and third superintendent of The Citadel.
- Susan Bethia Capers
- Esther Anslie Withers Capers, died young
- William Tertius Capers, Bishop of Texas
- Sarah Ann Branham Capers
- Harriet Emma Maria Haslope Capers
- Mary Singeltary Capers
- Henry Dickson Capers
- Ellison Capers, Bishop of South Carolina
- Theodotus LeGrand Capers

== See also ==
- List of bishops of the United Methodist Church
