= Caper Peak =

Mountain in Montana, United States

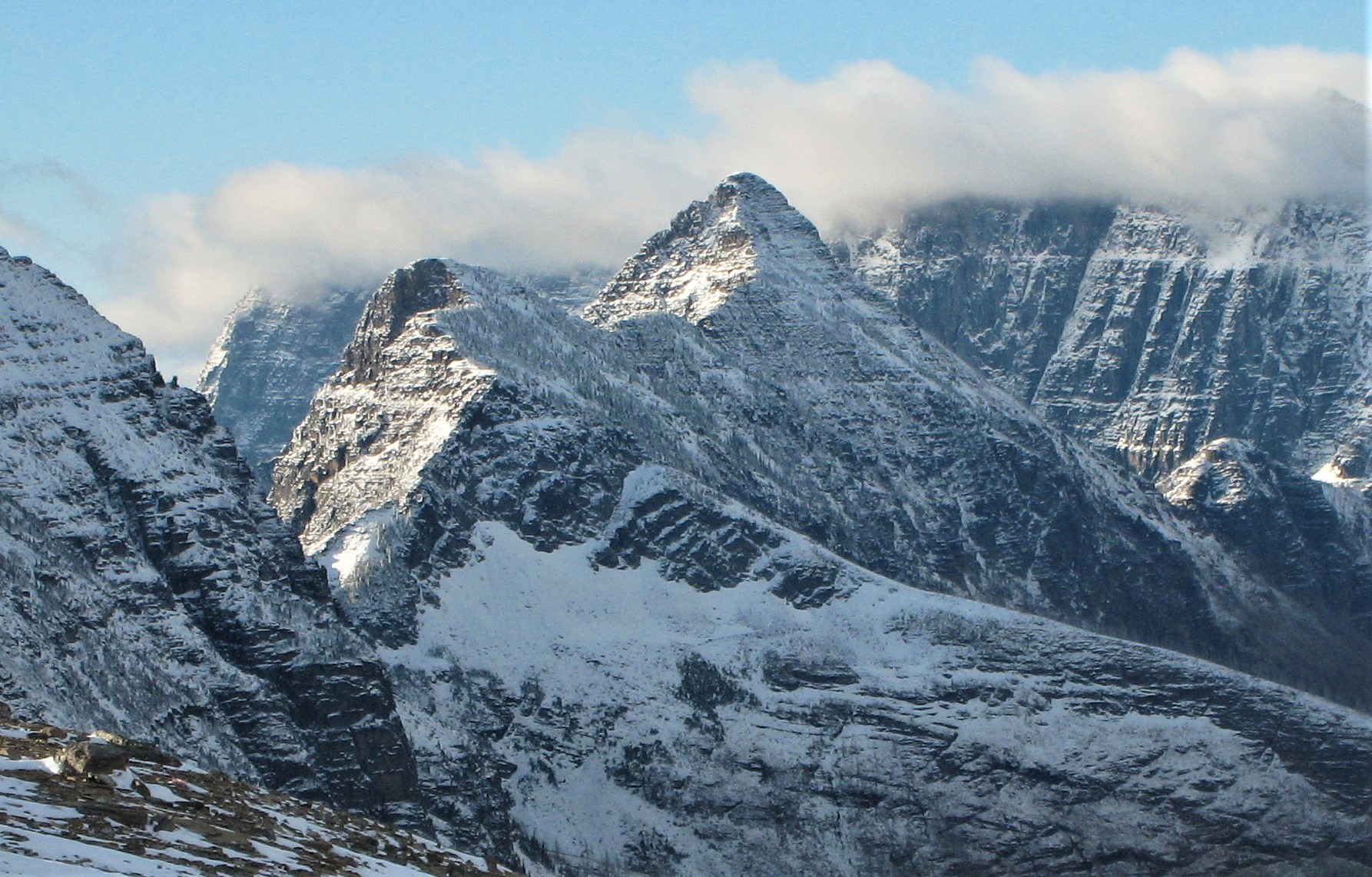
- Caper Peak centered, from Dawson Pass

Highest point
- Elevation: 8,310 ft (2,530 m) NAVD 88
- Prominence: 1,110 ft (340 m)
- Coordinates: 48°26′02″N 113°29′54″W

Geography
- Location within Montana Location within the United States
- Location: Flathead County, Montana, U.S.
- Parent range: Lewis Range
- Topo map(s): USGS Mount Rockwell, MT

Caper Peak (8,268 feet (2,520 m)) is located in the Lewis Range, Glacier National Park in the U.S. state of Montana. Caper Peak is approximately 1.4 miles (2.3 km) NNW of Vigil Peak. Richard T. Evans, USGS topographer who worked on the early map of Glacier Park, named this mountain when he counted over 30 goats "capering" on this peak. (Caper: A leap; a skip or spring, as in dancing or mirth, or in the frolic of a kid or lamb.)

== Geology ==
Like other mountains in Glacier National Park, the peak is composed of sedimentary rock laid down during the Precambrian to Jurassic periods. Formed in shallow seas, this sedimentary rock was initially uplifted beginning 170 million years ago when the Lewis Overthrust fault pushed an enormous slab of precambrian rocks 3 mi (4.8 km) thick, 50 miles (80 km) wide and 160 miles (260 km) long over younger rock of the cretaceous period.

== Climate ==
Based on the Köppen climate classification, the peak is located in an alpine subarctic climate zone with long, cold, snowy winters, and cool to warm summers. Temperatures can drop below −10 °F with wind chill factors below −30 °F.

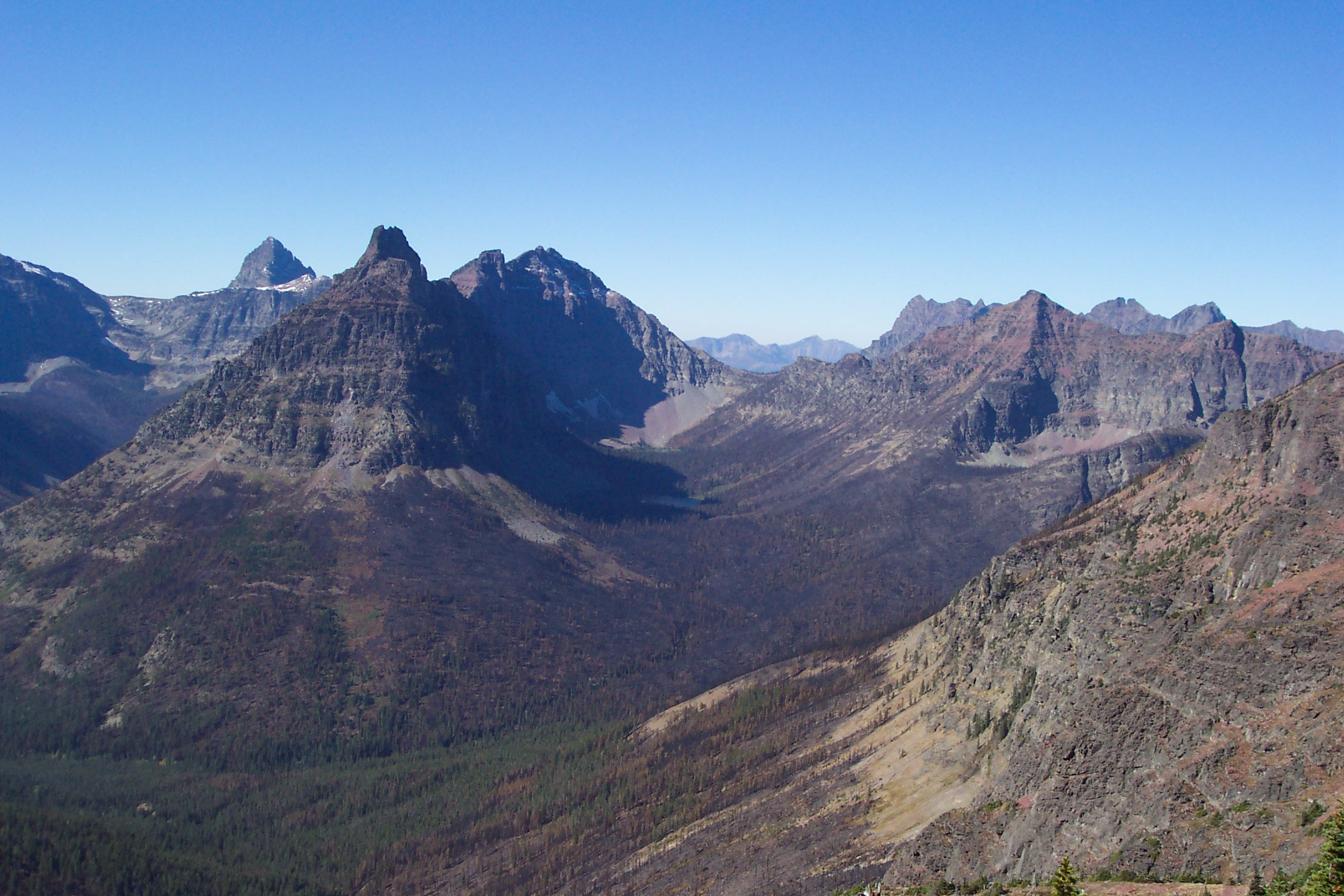
Caper Peak to right, east aspect. Saint Nicholas, Vigil, and Battlement to left.

== See also ==
- Mountains and mountain ranges of Glacier National Park (U.S.)
