= Francis W. Capers =

Confederate Army Brigadier General and educator (1819–1892)

Major Francis W. Capers
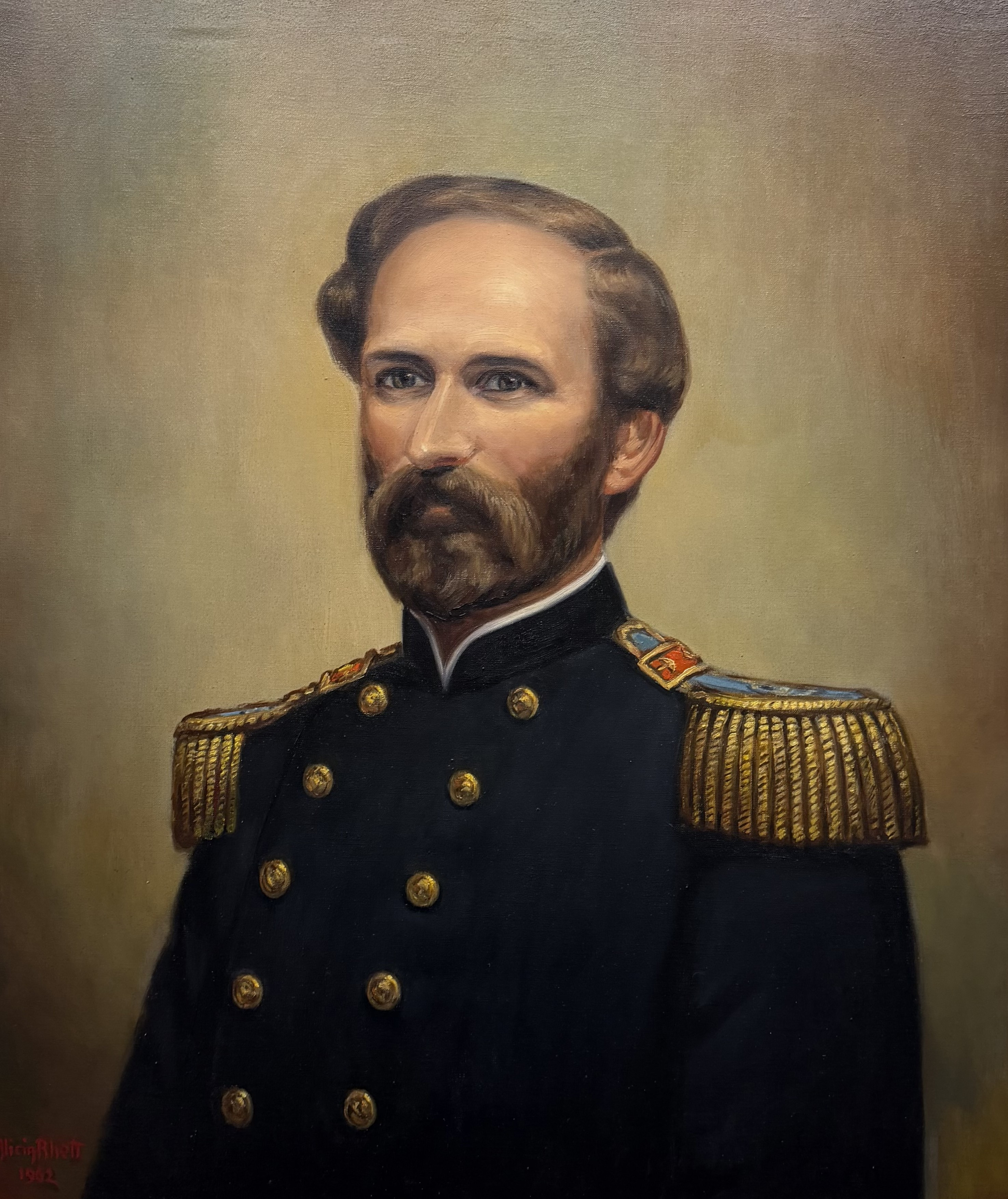
- 1962 Portrait of Capers by Alicia Rhett

Superintendent of the Georgia Military Institute
- In office 1859–1864
- Appointed by: Joseph E. Brown
- Preceded by: Position established
- Succeeded by: Position abolished

3rd Superintendent of The Citadel
- In office 1852–1859
- Preceded by: Richard W. Colcock
- Succeeded by: Peter Fayssoux Stevens

Superintendent of the Kentucky Military Institute
- In office 1846–1852

Personal details
- Born: Francis Withers Capers; August 8, 1819 Savannah, Georgia, United States
- Died: January 12, 1892 (aged 72) Charleston, South Carolina, United States
- Spouse(s): Hannah Hawk Bascom (m. 1848; died 1862) Susan Rutledge (m. 1865)
- Relations: Ellison Capers (brother)
- Children: 6
- Parent(s): William Capers; Susan McGill
- Education: Randolph–Macon College; South Carolina College

Military service
- Allegiance: United States; Confederate States
- Branch/service: Confederate States Army
- Years of service: 1861–1865
- Rank: Brigadier General (CSA)
- Commands: Georgia Militia
- Battles/wars: American Civil War; Battle of Resaca; Sherman's March to the Sea

Francis Withers Capers (8 August 1819 – 12 January 1892) was an American Confederate soldier and educator who served as Brigadier General of the Confederate States Army. He is mostly known as the third superintendent of the South Carolina Military Academy (now called The Citadel).

== Early life and education ==
Francis Withers Capers was born on 8 August 1819 in Savannah, Georgia, to Methodist bishop William Capers and his second wife, Susan McGill. He is the second child out of 11 siblings by William's second wife, although some state he is the eldest son due to the death of the first son at a young age. His brother was Ellison Capers, a Confederate Army General and Bishop of South Carolina.

He entered Randolph–Macon College in Virginia and subsequently graduated from South Carolina College in Charleston, graduating at 19 years old with the highest honors in 1839.

== Career ==
After graduating, Capers worked as a tutor at his alma mater for some time. Upon the organization of the South Carolina Military College in Charleston (now called The Citadel), he was appointed Professor of Literature with the rank of first lieutenant on 23 February 1843. He was later promoted to Captain of the school but resigned sometime between 1844 and 1847, when he was elected Professor of Ancient Languages at Transylvania College in Kentucky.

Capers was first assigned as superintendent at the Kentucky Military Institute in 1846, but returned to The Citadel in 1852 as superintendent there because of an annual appropriation of fifty thousand dollars by the Legislature of South Carolina to make the college as good as the West Point Military Academy. He replaced Richard W. Colcock as superintendent and was ranked up to Major.

In 1859, Georgian Governor Joseph E. Brown, fearing that a conflict might happen between the Northern and Southern States, appointed Capers as superintendent of the Georgia Military Institute in Marietta, a position which he held until the end of the American Civil War.

After the Union army invaded parts of Virginia, Governor Brown, fearing that the same thing might happen in Georgia, organized the Georgia Militia and appointed Capers as Brigadier General alongside Henry R. Jackson and Thomas Harrison. After a year had passed, Capers devoted his time to educating the Georgian Cadets under his command. He also engaged a corps of Military Engineers, with which he took his cadets and laid out a line of defense near Cassville, where Joseph E. Johnston engaged at the Battle of Resaca.

After General William Sherman won the battle and burned the Georgia Military Institute in Marietta, Capers moved his cadets to Milledgeville and subsequently formed them into a battalion of infantry. At the Oconee River, he held a defense against Sherman's March to the Sea, but was soon flanked by greater numbers.

After the end of the Civil War, Capers opened up a private school in Augusta and taught there. In 1867, he was appointed Professor of Mathematics at the College of Charleston, a position which he held for two years until his death.

Capers died on 12 January 1892 in Charleston. The funeral was said to be attended not only by people in Charleston, but also from parts of South Carolina and Georgia. Capers Hall, a building in The Citadel housing the School of Humanities and Social Sciences, was named after Francis and his brother Ellison, who was an 1857 graduate of the college.

== Personal life ==
In 1848, Capers married Hannah Hawk Bascom, daughter of Bishop Henry Bidleman Bascom of Kentucky, who died in 1862. They had six children: William Bascom Capers (1849–1917), Francis Withers Capers II (1852–1909), Alpheus Bordeaux Capers (1854–1902), Mary Percival Capers (1858–1858), and Clara Stewart Capers (1860–1926).

Capers remarried in 1865 to Susan Rutledge, daughter of John Rutledge Jr. and granddaughter of John Rutledge.

Preceded by Major Richard W. Colcock	President of The Citadel; 1852–1859	Succeeded by Major Peter Fayssoux Stevens
