= Son of a gun =

English exclamatory expression

Son of a gun is an exclamation in American English. It can be used as an encouragement or as a compliment, as in "You son of a gun, you did it!"

== Definition ==
The Cambridge Advanced Learner's Dictionary and Webster's Dictionary both define "son of a gun" in American English as a euphemism for son of a bitch. Encarta Dictionary defines the term differently, as someone "affectionately or kindly regarded." The term can also be used as an interjection expressing surprise, mild annoyance or disappointment.

== Etymology ==
The phrase is found in a piece of comic verse from 1726:

You Apollo's son,
You're a son of a gun,
Made up with bamboozle,
You directly I'll puzzle;

A 1787 correspondent to The Gentleman's Magazine suggested that the phrase originally meant "a soldier's brat".

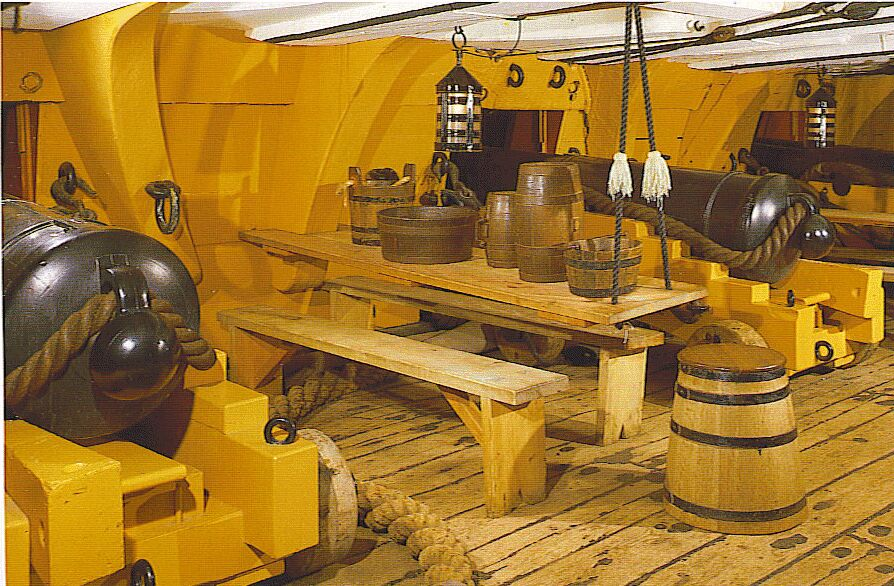
A 19th-century gun deck (HMS Victory)

The phrase may originate from a Royal Navy direction that pregnant women aboard smaller naval vessels give birth in the space between the broadside guns to keep the gangways and crew decks clear. Admiral William Henry Smyth wrote in his 1867 book, The Sailor's Word-Book: "Son of a gun, an epithet conveying contempt in a slight degree, and originally applied to boys born afloat, when women were permitted to accompany their husbands to sea; one admiral declared he literally was thus cradled, under the breast of a gun-carriage."

Alternatively, historian Brian Downing proposes that the phrase "son of a gun" originated from feudal knights' disdain for newly developed firearms and those who wielded them. According to an American urban myth, the saying originated in a story reported in the October 7, 1864, the issue of The American Medical Weekly about a woman who was impregnated by a bullet that passed through a soldier's testicles and into her womb. The story was a joke written by Legrand G. Capers, but some readers failed to realize this and reported it as true. This myth was the subject of an episode of the television series MythBusters, in which experiments showed the story to be implausible.
