= Ellison Capers =

Confederate Army general (1837–1908)

The Right Reverend Ellison Capers D.D.
- Bishop of South Carolina
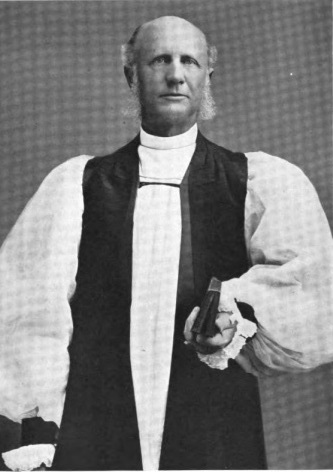
- Capers during his time as bishop
- Church: Episcopal Church
- Diocese: South Carolina
- Elected: May 4, 1893
- In office: 1894–1908
- Predecessor: William B. W. Howe
- Successor: William A. Guerry

Orders
- Ordination: September 13, 1868 by Thomas F. Davis
- Consecration: July 20, 1893 by Theodore B. Lyman

Personal details
- Born: October 14, 1837 Charleston, South Carolina, United States
- Died: April 22, 1908 (aged 70) Columbia, South Carolina, United States
- Parents: William Capers (father)
- Children: 5, including John and William Theodotus
- Military career
- Allegiance: Confederate States of America
- Branch: Confederate States Army
- Service years: 1861–65
- Rank: Brigadier General
- Commands: 24th South Carolina Infantry; Gist's Brigade
- Conflicts: American Civil War: Vicksburg Campaign; Battle of Jackson; Battle of Chickamauga; Battle of Franklin

Ellison Capers (October 14, 1837 – April 22, 1908) was a Confederate general in the American Civil War, theologian, college professor and administrator from South Carolina.

== Early life ==
Capers was the son of Methodist bishop William Capers and his second wife Susan McGill. He was born in Charleston, South Carolina, and educated in local schools. He graduated from the South Carolina Military Academy (now The Citadel) in 1857; he studied law for a time and then was appointed as a Professor of Mathematics and Rhetoric at SCMA. He spent a year teaching mathematics at Mt. Zion College in Winnsboro, South Carolina, then returned to his position at SCMA in 1860.

== Civil War ==
Capers during the Civil War

At the outbreak of the Civil War, Capers joined the Confederate Army with the rank of major. He was present at the bombardment of Fort Sumter then saw action at James Island and the Battle of Secessionville; he next served on coastal defense duties until 1863, having been promoted to lieutenant colonel of the 24th South Carolina. In May 1863 the regiment joined the army of General Joseph E. Johnston for the Vicksburg Campaign. Capers was wounded in the leg at Jackson, Mississippi, but promoted to colonel.

Capers returned to field service in time for the Chickamauga Campaign with the Army of Tennessee. He fought in the disastrous Battle of Franklin where he was severely wounded. After the campaign he commanded a brigade, replacing States Rights Gist, who had been killed in action. Capers was promoted to brigadier general on March 1, 1865, shortly before the end of hostilities. He was captured at Bentonville, North Carolina, but there is no record of parole.

== Postbellum career ==
Capers returned home after the Civil War. In December 1865, he was elected Secretary of State for South Carolina. Ordained as an Episcopal Priest in 1868 he was rector of Christ Church (Episcopal) in Greenville while also teaching at Greenville Military Academy, Greenville Female Academy and Furman University. In 1875 he became minister of St Johns Church in Selma, Alabama, and after a year returned to Christ Church in Greenville; in 1887 he was called to Trinity Church in Columbia, South Carolina.

He was elected Coadjutor Bishop of South Carolina and was consecrated on July 20, 1893. He became the diocesan bishop, the third bishop of South Carolina, in 1894. He served as the Episcopal Bishop of South Carolina from 1894 to his death, he also served as chancellor of Sewanee: The University of the South from 1904 to 1908. He served on the board of the John F. Slater Fund for the Education of Freedmen.

In 1859 he married Charlotte Rebecca Palmer, a relative of Francis Marion; they had 5 children together, which included Bishop of West Texas William Theodotus Capers and the 18th Commissioner of Internal Revenue John G. Capers. His sister Mary was the first wife of Major Peter F. Stevens, a fellow SCMA Professor who was Superintendent 1859–61 and also later an Episcopal Bishop. Bishop Capers died in Columbia, South Carolina, in 1908 and is buried there at Trinity Episcopal Churchyard.

== Honors ==
He was awarded an honorary Doctorate of Divinity by the University of South Carolina in 1889. The General Ellison Capers Camp #1212 of the Sons of Confederate Veterans was named in his honor. Capers Hall, the main academic building at The Citadel is named for him and his brother Major Francis W. Capers, who served as Superintendent from 1852 to 1859. Ellison delivered the commencement address at The Citadel in 1886.

== See also ==
- List of American Civil War generals (Confederate)
- List of American Civil War generals (Union)
- Bibliography of the American Civil War

== Notes ==
Episcopal Church (USA) titles
Preceded by William B. W. Howe	7th Bishop of South Carolina; 1894 – 1908	Succeeded by William A. Guerry
