= Cynthia Flynn Capers =

American nursing researcher and educator

- Born: January 3, 1945 (age 81); Harrisburg, Pennsylvania, U.S.
- Education: Freedmen’s Hospital School of Nursing, University of Maryland, University of Pennsylvania, Harvard University
- Scientific career
- Fields: Nursing education
- Workplaces: University of Akron

Cynthia Flynn Capers (born January 3, 1945) is an American nurse, educator, researcher and administrator. She is Dean of the University of Akron's School of Nursing, Chair of the Pennsylvania State Board of Nursing, national advisor to the Johnson & Johnson Campaign for Nursing's Future, and board member of the Commission on Collegiate Nursing Education.

== Early life ==
Capers was born on January 3, 1945, in Harrisburg, Pennsylvania. She is the daughter of Charles E. Flynn and Lucy Gibbs Flynn (later Bibby).

== Education ==
Capers began her nursing education at Freedmen's Hospital School of Nursing (now Howard University Hospital), a historically Black hospital and nurses' training school in Washington, D.C. She graduated from Freedmen's Hospital with her RN diploma in 1965.

She enrolled at the University of Maryland and graduated with her bachelor's degree in nursing in 1968. She then attended the University of Pennsylvania in their Child and Adolescent Psychiatry program, graduating with a masters in nursing science degree relating to family and pediatric nursing in 1981.

Capers returned to the University of Pennsylvania, with support from the American Nurses Association (ANA) Minority Fellowship Program (ANAMFP). She received her PhD in nursing in 1986. She was the first Black student to graduate from the School of Nursing’s PhD program. With the ANA’s support, she was a Postdoctoral Fellow at the University of Pennsylvania from 1989 to 1990, the first Minority person to receive a post-doctoral fellowship there.

Capers was a selected participant of Harvard University's Institute for Management and Leadership in Education in 2001.

She is a member of the Alpha Kappa Alpha Sorority Inc. Her portrait was published in Spring 1997, Vol. 75, No. 1, of The Ivy Leaf, which chronicles the Sorority.

== Career ==
While attending the University of Maryland, she worked in pediatrics as a part-time clinical nurse. After attaining her BSN from the University of Maryland, she moved to Philadelphia and began working at Philadelphia General Hospital (PGH) School of Nursing teaching Maternity Nursing.

After completing her MSN and the course work for her PhD at the University of Pennsylvania, she accepted a position as assistant professor at La Salle University. Concurrently, she completed her dissertation, attained her PhD and began her postdoctoral work.

Capers has worked primarily in nursing education, including at Thomas Jefferson University.

In 1997, Capers joined the University of Akron, and was appointed Dean of the University of Akron's College of Nursing in 2002 and served in that position until 2012. While at Akron she helped to establish the College of Nursing's Center for Gerontological Health Nursing and Advocacy.

== Research ==
For her PhD dissertation, Capers’ research addressed views about psychiatric behaviors and mental health. Her dissertation, titled “Perceptions of problematic behavior as held by lay black adults and registered nurses” (1986), addressed how the label of “mental illness” can change across education and race, and how educational attainment and access to healthcare influence a social group's definition of mental illness.

For her postdoctoral research, Capers evaluated the family dynamics of those with adolescent mothers giving birth to premature infants. This work attempts to determine the identifies of adolescent mothers' primary emotional and physical caregivers, and their characteristic challenges and needs to enable health care providers to more effectively support these families.

In addition, Capers has published articles on topics such as obesity, adolescent health, psychiatric nursing, and teaching diversity.

== Publications ==
Capers’ published works include:

- Capers, Cynthia Flynn; Baughman, Kristin; Logue, Everett (June 2011). "Behaviors and Characteristics of African American and European American Females That Impact Weight Management: Characteristics That Impact Weight Management". Journal of Nursing Scholarship. 43 (2): 133–144. doi:10.1111/j.1547-5069.2011.01393.x. PMID 21605317.
- Stanley, Joan M.; Capers, Cynthia Flynn; Berlin, Linda E. (September 2007). "Changing the Face of Nursing Faculty: Minority Faculty Recruitment and Retention". Journal of Professional Nursing. 23 (5): 253–261. doi:10.1016/j.profnurs.2007.07.005. PMID 17903783.
- Logue, Everett; Sutton, Karen; Jarjoura, David; Smucker, William; Baughman, Kristin; Capers, Cynthia (May 2005). "Transtheoretical Model-Chronic Disease Care for Obesity in Primary Care: A Randomized Trial". Obesity Research. 13 (5): 917–927. doi:10.1038/oby.2005.106. PMID 15919846.
- Logue, Everett E.; Jarjoura, David G.; Sutton, Karen S.; Smucker, William D.; Baughman, Kristin R.; Capers, Cynthia F. (September 2004). "Longitudinal Relationship between Elapsed Time in the Action Stages of Change and Weight Loss". Obesity Research. 12 (9): 1499–1508. doi:10.1038/oby.2004.187. PMID 15483215.
- Baughman, Kristin; Logue, Everett; Sutton, Karen; Capers, Cynthia; Jarjoura, David; Smucker, William (August 2003). "Biopsychosocial characteristics of overweight and obese primary care patients: do psychosocial and behavior factors mediate sociodemographic effects?". Preventive Medicine. 37 (2): 129–137. doi:10.1016/s0091-7435(03)00095-1. PMID 12855212.
- Sutton, Karen; Logue, Everett; Jarjoura, David; Baughman, Kristin; Smucker, William; Capers, Cynthia (May 2003). "Assessing Dietary and Exercise Stage of Change to Optimize Weight Loss Interventions". Obesity Research. 11 (5): 641–652. doi:10.1038/oby.2003.92. PMID 12740454.
- Capers, Cynthia Flynn; Wessman, Joan (January 2000). "Re-look at Service as an Innovation for Nursing". Holistic Nursing Practice. 14 (2): 1–12. doi:10.1097/00004650-200001000-00004. PMID 12119965.

== Awards ==
- 1995 Distinguished Nurse Award from the Pennsylvania Nurses Association
- 1995 Resolution from the Pennsylvania State Board of Nursing for Outstanding Contributions
- 1997 Award for Outstanding Achievement, Leadership and Service from the Medical Society of Eastern Pennsylvania
- 2006 ATHENA Award for community service and active role in aiding women attain professional excellence and leadership
