= Patrick Military Institute =

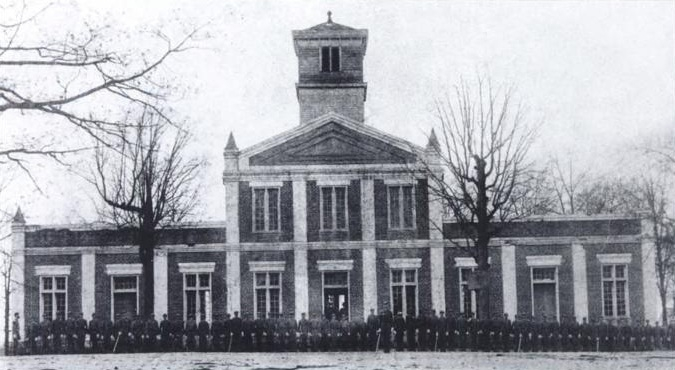
- Postcard of the Patrick Military Institute ca. 1893

Location
- Anderson, South Carolina
- Coordinates: 34.4955°N 82.6486°W

Information
- School type: Military Academy
- Established: 1878
- Founder: John Bellinger Patrick
- Status: defunct
- Closed: 1900

The Patrick Military Institute was an American military school founded in South Carolina by Colonel John Bellinger Patrick. The school operated from 1878 to 1900.

== History ==
The institute was initially founded in 1878 as the Greenville Military Institute, when Patrick converted the Greenville, South Carolina high school into a military-style academy for secondary education. The school operated in Greenville until 1887, having graduated 21 cadets. In need of a larger campus in 1887, Patrick relocated the school into the buildings of the former Carolina Collegiate Institute in Anderson, South Carolina, where it was renamed the Patrick Military Institute. By 1893, total enrollment had increased to 118 students. Colonel Patrick died in September 1900 and the school was closed that same year.

== Study ==
A faculty of 6 teachers and 3 lecturers taught an academic curriculum which included English, German, French, Greek, Latin, Mathematics and Bookkeeping as well as Military Science and Tactics. Practical military instruction included infantry drills, target practice, guard duty and army organization.
