= Caper white =

The caper whites are the butterflies in the genus Belenois.

Caper white is also used to refer to several single species of butterfly:

- Belenois aurota, native to Africa and South Asia
- Belenois java, native to Southeast Asia and Australia
