= List of presidents of The Citadel =

President of The Citadel
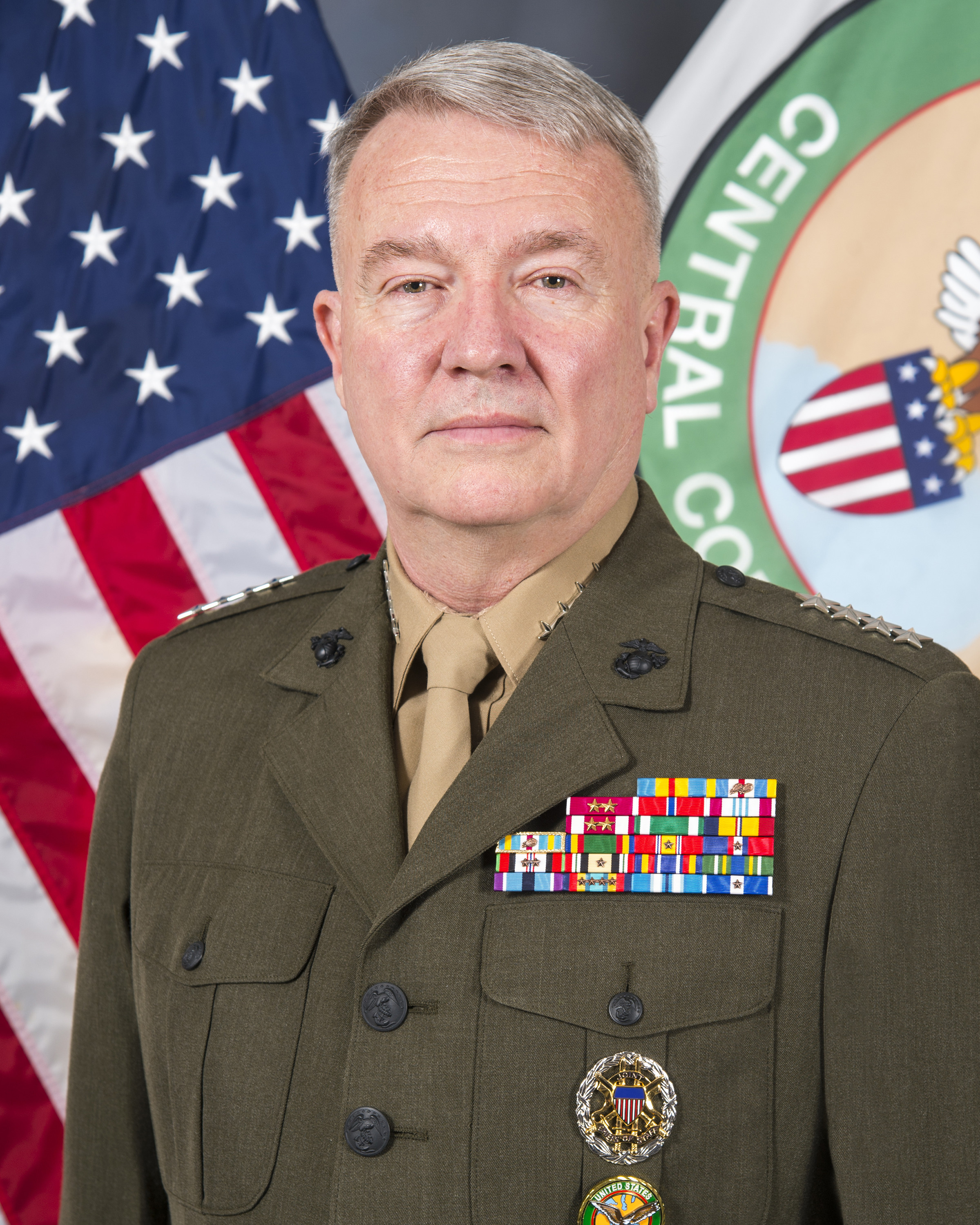
- Incumbent; Kenneth F. McKenzie Jr. since July 1, 2026
- Seat: Quarters One
- Formation: 1843
- First holder: William F. Graham
- Website: Official website

The president of The Citadel is the chief administrator of The Citadel, a public senior military college in Charleston, South Carolina. Previously known as the Superintendent, the title was changed in 1921 during the tenure of Colonel Oliver J. Bond.

The Citadel was a component of the South Carolina Military Academy from 1845 to 1865. The Arsenal Academy, located in Columbia, South Carolina, made up the other portion of the academy, with cadets receiving their initial training in the first year at The Arsenal before moving to The Citadel to complete the final three years of their education. Each campus had its own superintendent, but reported to the same Board of Visitors. Initially, both superintendents held the rank of captain, but in 1845 The Citadel's superintendent became a major.

On March 23, 2026, The Citadel announced that General Kenneth F. "Frank" McKenzie Jr. was selected from a pool of four finalists to lead the college after the retirement of General Glenn M. Walters, slated for June 30, 2026.

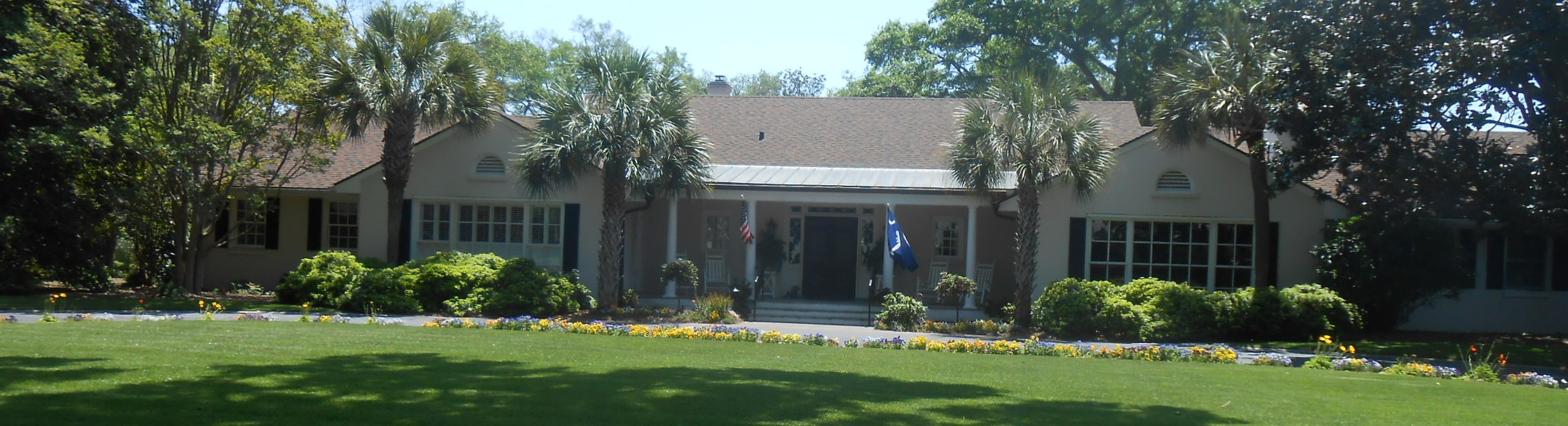
Quarters One

Presidents of The Citadel today occupy a home on campus known as Quarters One.

== The Citadel ==
=== Superintendents ===
No.	Image	Name	Branch	Began	Ended	Alma mater	Class	Notes
1		Captain William F. Graham	USA	1843	1844	USMA	1838	
2		Major Richard W. Colcock	USA	1844	1852	USMA	1826	
3		Major Francis W. Capers	SCM	1852	1859	College of Charleston	1839	
4		Major Peter Fayssoux Stevens	SCM	1859	1861	The Citadel	1849	
5		Major James B. White	SCM	1861	1865	The Citadel	1849	
6		Colonel John P. Thomas	CSA	1882	1885	The Citadel	1851	
7		BrigGen George D. Johnston	CSA	1885	1890	Howard (AL)		
8		Colonel Asbury Coward	CSA	1890	1908	The Citadel	1854	
9		Colonel Oliver James Bond	SCM	1908	1921	The Citadel	1886	

=== Presidents ===
No.	Image	Name	Branch	Began	Ended	Alma mater	Class	Notes
9		Colonel Oliver James Bond	SCM	1921	1931	The Citadel	1886	
10		General Charles P. Summerall	USA	1931	1953	USMA	1892	
–		Colonel Louis S. LeTellier	SCM	1953	1954	Virginia		
11		General Mark W. Clark	USA	1954	1965	USMA	1917	
12		General Hugh P. Harris	USA	1965	1970	USMA	1931	
13		MajGen James A. Duckett	SCM	1970	1974	The Citadel	1932	
14		LtGen George M. Seignious	USA	1974	1979	The Citadel	1942	
–		MajGen Wallace Anderson	SCM	1979	1979	The Citadel	1934	
15		VADM James B. Stockdale	USN	1979	1980	USNA	1947	
16		MajGen James Grimsley Jr.	USA	1980	1989	The Citadel	1942	
17		LtGen Cladius E. Watts	USAF	1989	1996	The Citadel	1959	
–		BrigGen Roger C. Poole	USAR	1996	1997	The Citadel	1959	
18		MajGen John S. Grinalds	USMC	1997	2005	USMA	1959	
–		BrigGen Roger C. Poole	USAR	2005	2006	The Citadel	1959	
19		LtGen John W. Rosa Jr.	USAF	2006	2018	The Citadel	1973	
–		LtGen John B. Sams Jr.	USAF	2018	2018	The Citadel	1967	
20		General Glenn M. Walters	USMC	2018	2026	The Citadel	1979	
21		General Frank McKenzie	USMC	2026		The Citadel	1979	

== The Arsenal ==
Initially created as a separate academy, The Arsenal in Columbia, South Carolina became an auxiliary to The Citadel in 1845. Together, the schools comprised the South Carolina Military Academy. Cadets completed their first year at The Arsenal before moving to The Citadel for the remainder of their tenure. In May, 1865, the remainder of the Battalion of State Cadets, which was primarily composed of Arsenal cadets, disbanded at Newberry, South Carolina as one of the last Confederate units to disband. The Arsenal never reopened, its buildings mostly destroyed in the burning of Columbia by General Sherman. One building that remains is currently the used as the South Carolina Governor's Mansion.

=== Superintendents ===
No.	Image	Name	Branch	Began	Ended	Alma mater	Class	Notes
1		Captain Alfred Herbert	SCM	1842	1845			
2		Captain Joseph Matthews	SCM	1845	1856			
3		Captain Charles Courtenay Tew	SCM	1856	1858	The Citadel	1846	
4		Captain James B. White	SCM	1858	1861	The Citadel	1849	
5		Captain John P. Thomas	SCM	1861	1865	The Citadel	1851	
