= Ellen Hargrove =

Charlotte Brown and Ellen Hargrove were African American women enslaved in South Carolina in the mid‑19th century. Their lives are documented through archival records, genealogical research, and family oral tradition, most notably in the published work of Morna Lahnice Hollister. Brown was the mother of Hargrove, whose descendants have traced their lineage through both documentary evidence and DNA analysis.

== Charlotte Brown ==
Charlotte Brown was an enslaved woman in South Carolina in the early to mid‑19th century. Little is known about her early life, including her birth year, parentage, or the circumstances under which she came into the household of the Coward family. Archival records identify her as the mother of at least one daughter, Ellen Hargrove, born during the period of her enslavement.

Brown’s life, like that of many enslaved women, is sparsely documented in written records. Her presence is preserved primarily through the genealogical traces left by her descendants and through the work of researchers who have reconstructed her family line.

== Ellen Hargrove ==
Ellen Hargrove, daughter of Charlotte Brown, was born into slavery in South Carolina. She later lived in the household of Asbury Coward in Yorkville, where she remained through the Civil War and into the Reconstruction era.

=== Enslavement ===
Hargrove lived and worked in the Coward household in Yorkville. Surviving records document her presence but provide limited detail about her daily life or labor. Her experiences reflect those of many enslaved women whose lives were shaped by the institution of slavery and whose histories were not preserved in written form.

=== Children ===
During her years in Yorkville, Hargrove bore five children, with births recorded in 1857, 1860, 1862, 1866, and 1874. The paternity of her children is not documented in surviving records; however, family tradition among her descendants holds that her last enslaver, Asbury Coward, fathered them.

=== Emancipation and later life ===
After emancipation, Hargrove remained in Yorkville, raising her children and establishing a family line that continues into the present. Her descendants have traced their lineage through archival documents, oral history, and DNA evidence, contributing to a fuller understanding of her life and legacy.

== Legacy ==
The lives of Charlotte Brown and Ellen Hargrove represent the experiences of generations of enslaved women whose stories were rarely recorded in official documents. Recent genealogical scholarship, including the work of Morna Lahnice Hollister, has brought renewed attention to their family line and the broader history of African American women in South Carolina.
