= James Duckett (disambiguation) =

James Duckett may also refer to:

- James Duckett (died 1602), English Catholic layman and martyr
- James W. Duckett (1911–1991), American military official
- James Aren Duckett (1957–2026), American convicted murderer
