= Baker School of Business =

Business school of The Citadel

Tommy and Victoria Baker School of Business
- Established: 2002
- Parent institution: The Citadel
- Dean: Col. Michael Weeks, PhD (USAF, Retired)
- Undergraduates: 749
- Postgraduates: 251
- Location: Charleston, South Carolina, US; 32.795916°N 79.959491°W
- Website: citadel.edu/business

The Baker School of Business, officially named the Tommy and Victoria Baker School of Business (or the “BSB”), is the business school of The Citadel, public senior military college in Charleston, South Carolina.

The Baker School of Business currently enrolls over 700 undergraduate and 250 graduate students in bachelor's and master's degree programs. It was established in 2002 as The Citadel reorganized its existing departments into the five schools. As of January, 2021, the school was located in the college's newest academic building, Bastin Hall.

The school was renamed in 2017 following a sizeable donation from Tommy and Victoria Baker. The school has been accredited by the Association to Advance Collegiate Schools of Business (AACSB) since 1996.

== Departments ==
The Baker School of Business is composed of three academic departments:

- Accounting & Finance
- Management & Entrepreneurship
- Marketing, Supply Chain Management, & Economics

== Undergraduate program ==
The degree of Bachelor of Science in Business Administration (BSBA) is conferred upon satisfactory completion of an undergraduate major program of study within the Baker School of Business.

The Citadel's undergraduate day program is available to cadets, veterans, and active duty military members (not available to civilians). The Citadel's undergraduate degree completion program offered through the Citadel Graduate College is open to anyone, regardless of military status.

== Graduate program ==
The degree of Master of Business Administration (MBA) is conferred upon satisfactory completion of a graduate major program of study within the Baker School of Business.

The Baker School of Business' graduate program is available to anyone, regardless of military status, and can be completed in-person or online. In 2020, the MBA program was ranked 97th in the nation by U.S. News & World Report, while the online program was ranked 102nd. It also was named 58th among online programs for veterans.
