= Woodberry Forest School =

High school in Woodberry Forest, Virginia, US

Location
- 898 Woodberry Forest Rd; Woodberry Forest, Madison County, Virginia 22989-9998; United States; 38°17′31.9″N 78°7′19.5″W

Information
- Type: Independent boarding high school
- Motto: Latin: A Posse Ad Esse (From Possibility to Actuality)
- Religious affiliation: Nonsectarian
- Established: 1889; 137 years ago
- Founder: Robert Stringfellow Walker
- Status: Currently operational
- CEEB code: 472455
- NCES School ID: 01433725
- Headmaster: Byron Hulsey
- Faculty: 60.9 (on an FTE basis)
- Grades: 9-12
- Gender: All-boys
- Enrollment: 392 (2023-2024)
  - Grade 9: 94
  - Grade 10: 98
  - Grade 11: 109
  - Grade 12: 91
- Average class size: 10
- Student to teacher ratio: 6.6:1
- Hours in school day: 7.2
- Campus size: 1,200 acres (490 ha)
- Campus type: Fringe rural
- Colors: Orange & Black
- Nickname: Tigers
- Teams: 16 interscholastic sports 38 teams
- Rival: Episcopal High School
- Publication: The Talon
- Newspaper: The Oracle
- Endowment: $432 million
- Annual tuition: $65,350
- Affiliations: NAIS, TABS
- Website: woodberry.org
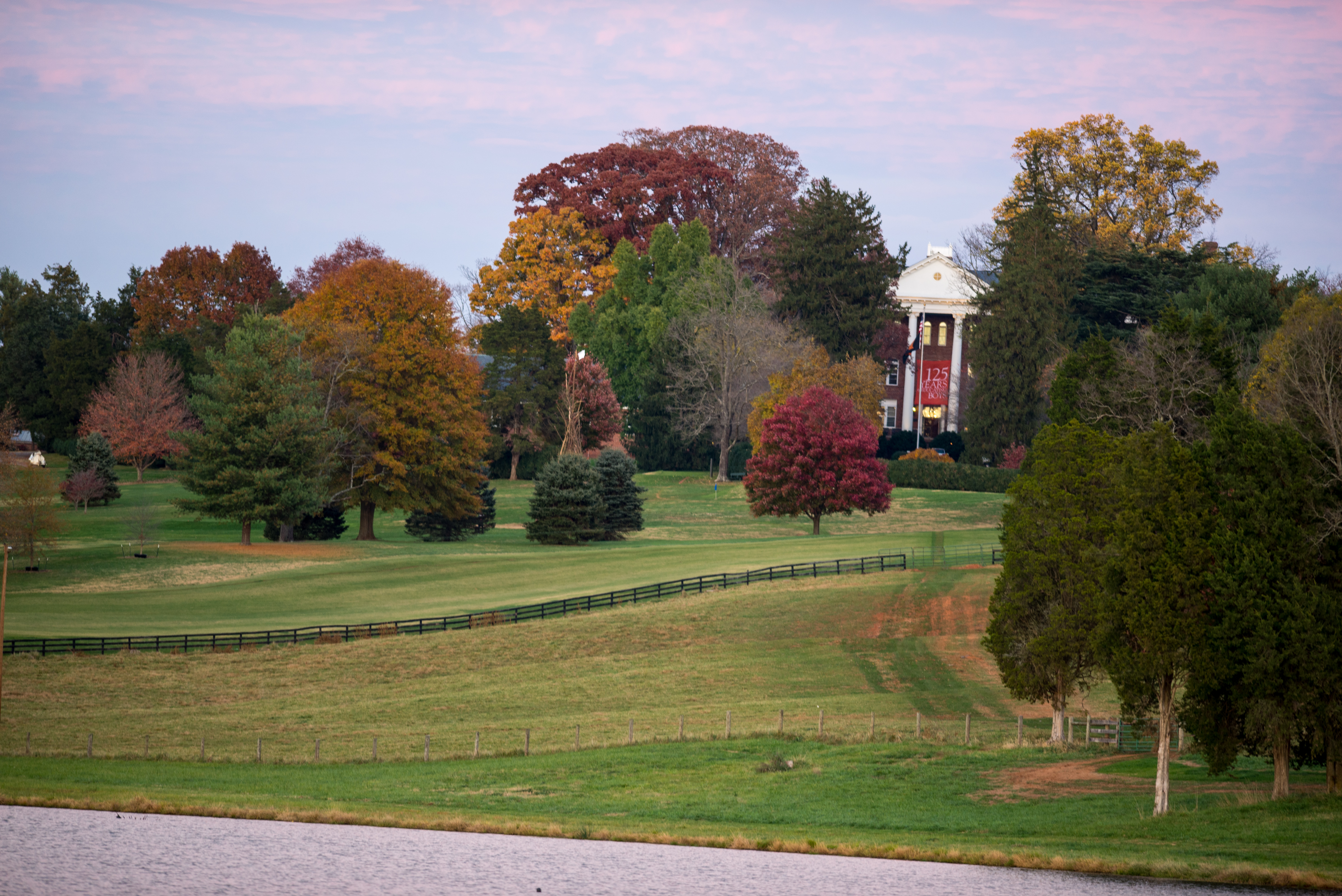
- A view of the school's Walker Building from Robertson Lake

Woodberry Forest School is a private, all-male boarding school located in Woodberry Forest, Madison County, Virginia, in the United States. Woodberry's current enrollment is 391. Students come from 34 U.S. states, Washington, D.C., and 36 countries. The school's endowment and managed funds total $432,000,000 as of June 30, 2023. Comprehensive tuition for 2023–2024 is $65,350; 41% of the students receive financial aid.

== History ==
The school was founded in 1889 by Captain Robert Stringfellow Walker, who had been a member of the 43rd Battalion Virginia Cavalry (Mosby's Rangers) in the Confederate Army during the American Civil War. The school occupies approximately 1,200 acres (4.9 km^{2}) in Madison, Virginia. The campus is bounded on one side by the Rapidan River. It was originally the estate of William Madison, brother of President James Madison. The headmaster's residence, known as The Residence, is taken entirely from an architectural design reputed to be by Thomas Jefferson. It was listed on the National Register of Historic Places in 1979. The property eventually passed to the Walker family. The school was founded when Walker hired a tutor to teach his six sons and other local children because of the lack of adequate schooling in the surrounding area. Today, the campus is known for its historic Jeffersonian brick buildings and state-of-the-art science and arts facilities.

J. Carter Walker, son of Captain Walker and a school graduate, graduated from the University of Virginia in 1897. According to Elizabeth Copeland Norfleet in A Venture in Faith, his plans to attend law school were interrupted by his father's request that he serve as "head teacher." Carter Walker later explained his decision to his brother: "I always did what Father and Mother told me to."

== Extracurricular activities ==
=== Athletics ===
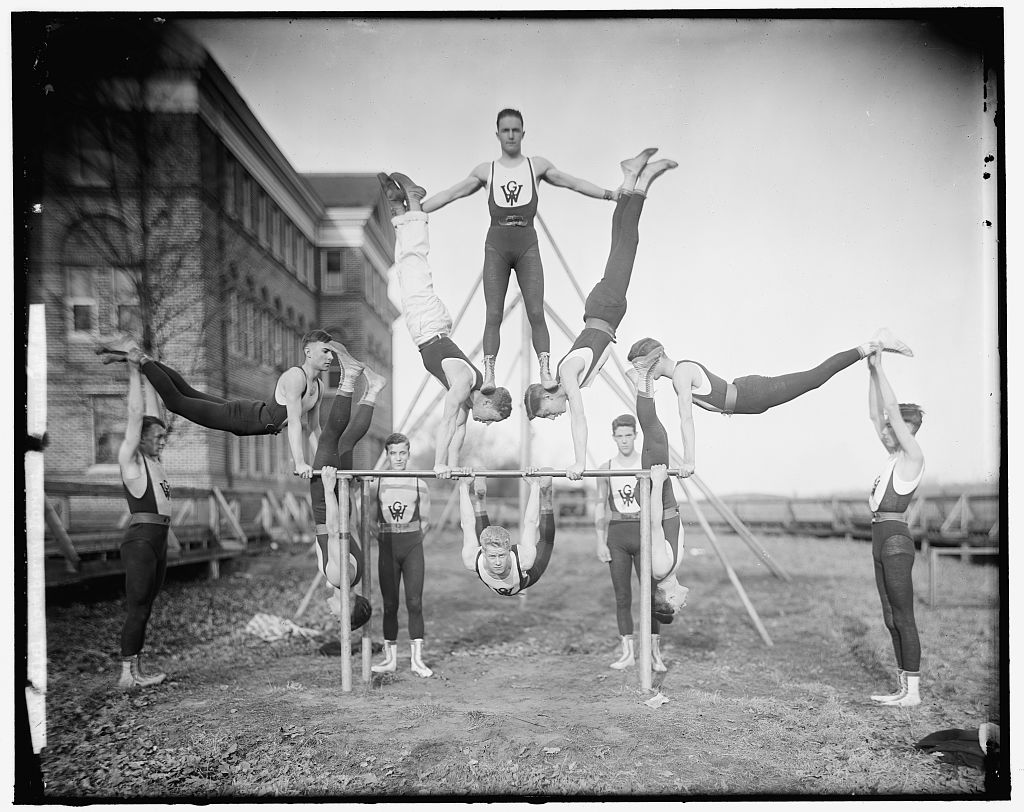
Woodberry Forest Gymnasium Team, ca. 1905, Library of Congress

Woodberry, nicknamed the Tigers, competes in the Virginia Prep League in a variety of sports, including basketball, soccer, baseball, golf, swimming, lacrosse, wrestling, Cross country running, Tennis, track and field, and football.

The longest-running high school football rivalry in the Southern United States takes place annually between Woodberry Forest and Episcopal High School of Alexandria, Virginia. The schools first played against each other in 1901, competing in almost 125 games. "The Game," as it is known, draws back many alumni and is considered the homecoming game for both schools. The location of the game alternates each year; it is either in Orange or Alexandria. The 100th contest, which Woodberry won, took place in 2000 and drew nearly 15,000 spectators. Before every game between the two schools, Woodberry has a bonfire reaching four stories high, where students line up to throw torches into a tower of logs. The bonfire draws nearly as many Woodberry fans as The Game itself.

The school's facilities include an on-campus 9-hole golf course designed by Donald Ross, an indoor track/pool complex, two turf football/lacrosse fields, two baseball fields, three competition-level soccer fields, and three other grass fields for football, soccer, and lacrosse.

The Tigers send numerous athletes to play college sports at all levels, including multiple NCAA Division I recruits each year.

=== Honor system and prefect board ===
A principal feature of life at Woodberry is its student-run honor system. A Prefect Board of roughly 18 senior students adjudicates the case of any students who "lie, cheat, or steal" and makes a recommendation to the headmaster. The Prefect Board may recommend an honor warning, honor probation, or honor dismissal. Anyone found violating the honor code severely is dismissed from the school. The Prefect Board is determined through a process involving students, faculty, and administration. In the spring trimester, an election among students is held, in which students are given a roster of the rising senior class and asked to select the 18 they feel are best suited for the role. Faculty undertake a similar process, and later, the administration interviews the individual candidates as determined by the initial elections. Finally, the headmaster determines the board's final composition, and it is announced publicly to the student body before the year's close.

Aside from maintaining the honor system, the Prefect Board guides the new students through orientation. Prefects also serve in roles similar to those of resident assistants, organizing dormitory events and informing students of news and events. The Prefect Board elects a Senior Prefect from among its members; his role is similar to that of a student body president, giving a speech at the assembly commencing the school year and at graduation in spring.

== Notable alumni ==
- Donald Antrim, novelist and MacArthur Fellow
- William Johnston Armfield IV, business executive and philanthropist
- Marvin P. Bush, Class of 1975, youngest son of George H. W. Bush and brother of George W. Bush
- DeQuece Carter, Class of 2019, college football wide receiver for the Fordham Rams and the Indiana Hoosiers
- Richard Thurmond Chatham, Congressman from North Carolina
- Martin Clark, author and Virginia circuit court judge
- Jack Cobb, standout basketball player for the University of North Carolina during the 1920s
- Charles W. Coker, former chairman/CEO of Sonoco Products
- Bosley Crowther, film critic for The New York Times
- Robert Daniel, five-term Congressman from Virginia
- Edward D. Dart, FAIA. Renowned Modernist architect
- Charles B. Dew, Class of 1954, Civil War historian
- Robert H. Edmunds Jr., Associate Justice of North Carolina Supreme Court
- Thomas B. Evans Jr., three-term Congressman from Delaware
- Kendall Gaskins, NFL running back
- Gordon Gray, National Security Advisor
- Arthur B. Hancock Jr., Thoroughbred racehorse owner and breeder
- John Wesley Hanes II, investment banker who served as Under Secretary of the United States Treasury and President of the New York Racing Association
- Burr Harrison, Congressman from Virginia
- Sam Hart, Chef and owner of Michelin Star-winning and James Beard Finalist Counter- in Charlotte, North Carolina
- Sacha Killeya-Jones (born 1998), American-British basketball player for Hapoel Gilboa Galil of the Israeli Basketball Premier League
- David Ho, founder of Harmony Airways
- Paul Ilyinsky, former mayor of Palm Beach
- William States Lee III, former chairman/CEO of Duke Power
- Julius Curtis Lewis Jr., former Mayor of Savannah, GA
- Paul C. P. McIlhenny, CEO of McIlhenny Co., producers of "Tabasco sauce"
- Alex McMillan, five-term Congressman from North Carolina
- James McMurtry, singer-songwriter
- Johnny Mercer, songwriter
- Halsey Minor, CNET Networks founder
- Rogers Morton, former United States Secretary of the Interior, United States Secretary of Commerce and Congressman from Maryland
- Thruston Morton, U.S. Congressman and Senator from Kentucky
- Beto O'Rourke, Class of 1991, former U.S. Congressman from the Texas 16th Congressional District
- Heinz Pagels, Class of 1956, particle physicist and executive director of the New York Academy of Sciences
- Noel Perrin, essayist and professor at Dartmouth College
- Earl Norfleet Phillips, Ambassador of the United States to Barbados, Dominica, St Lucia, Antigua, St. Vincent, and St. Christopher-Nevis-Anguilla
- Rufus Phillips, journalist, politician, and businessman
- L. Richardson Preyer, former jurist and six-term Congressman from North Carolina
- CJ Prosise, class of 2012, NFL running back for the Seattle Seahawks
- Ed Reynolds, American football safety in the National Football League
- J. Sargeant Reynolds, executive vice president of Reynolds Aluminum Credit Corp., Virginia House of Delegates, Senate of Virginia, Lieutenant Governor of Virginia
- Daniel L. Ritchie, former CEO of Westinghouse Broadcasting and former Chancellor of the University of Denver
- James D. Robinson III, former CEO of American Express
- William Fitts Ryan, Class of 1940, Congressman from New York
- Randolph Scott, actor
- Todd G. Sears, class of 1994, businessman and advocate for LGBT equality
- Dick Spangler, billionaire, former President of the University of North Carolina
- Will Strickler, class of 2004, professional golfer on PGA Tour
- W. Elliott Walden class of 1981, President and CEO of racing operations for WinStar Farm
- Angus Wall, class of 1984, Oscar-winning film editor
- Roger Wilson, Class of 1975, actor in Porky's
- Frank Wisner, OSS/CIA official
- Frank G. Wisner, former Under Secretary of Defense for Policy and Under Secretary of State for International Security Affairs, and former ambassador to India
- J. Craig Wright, Class of 1947, former justice of the Ohio Supreme Court
- Jaffray Woodriff, Class of 1986, co-founder and CEO of Quantitative Investment Management
- Jonathan Yardley, long-time book reviewer for the Washington Post

== Former headmasters ==
- J. Carter Walker (1898–1948)
- Shaun Kelley Jr. (1948–1952)
- Joseph M. Mercer (1952–1961)
- A. Baker Duncan Jr. (1961–1970)
- Charles W. Sheerin Jr. (1970–1973)
- Gerald L. Cooper (acting) (1973–1974)
- Emmett W. Wright Jr. (1974–1991)
- John S. Grinalds (1991–1997)
- Dennis M. Campbell (1997–2014)
- Byron C. Hulsey (2014–present)
