= Citadel Graduate College =

College in South Carolina

The Citadel Graduate College
- Type: Graduate College
- Established: 1966
- Affiliations: AASCU
- Asst. Dean: Emily Thomas
- Academic staff: 225
- Location: Charleston, South Carolina, U.S. 32°47′50″N 79°57′40″W
- Campus: Urban, 300 acres (121 ha)
- Colors: Citadel Blue and White
- Website: citadel.edu/graduate

The Citadel Graduate College, previously The Citadel College of Graduate and Professional Studies before 2007, is the non-residential academic program at The Citadel in Charleston, South Carolina. Offering a variety of undergraduate and graduate programs in a non-military environment, the college targets residents of the South Carolina Lowcountry and distance learning students. Classes are primarily offered online or at night, using the same faculty and classrooms as the cadet day program, but students at the Graduate College generally do not share classes with members of the South Carolina Corps of Cadets. Alternatively, students can attend programs at the Lowcountry Graduate Center in North Charleston, South Carolina or through recently established distance learning programs.

Established in 1966 as the Evening Undergraduate Program, the school began offering graduate degrees in 1968 under the name College of Graduate and Professional Studies. The program has continued to expand and now offers 19 graduate programs as well as seven undergraduate programs, most of which are degree completion tracks for those with associate degrees from South Carolina's technical colleges. In 2007, The Citadel changed the name of the program to The Citadel Graduate College.

In recent years, the Graduate College has launched new programs in engineering and cybersecurity. In January 2017, the school launched a nursing program, offered first to evening undergraduates (2+2 program for those with an associate degree) before being made available to cadets. Funded by a $4 million anonymous donation, the program is intended to address the need both in the armed services and the Charleston area for qualified nurses.
