= The Residence (Woodberry Forest School) =

Historic house in Virginia, United States

- U.S. National Register of Historic Places
- Virginia Landmarks Register
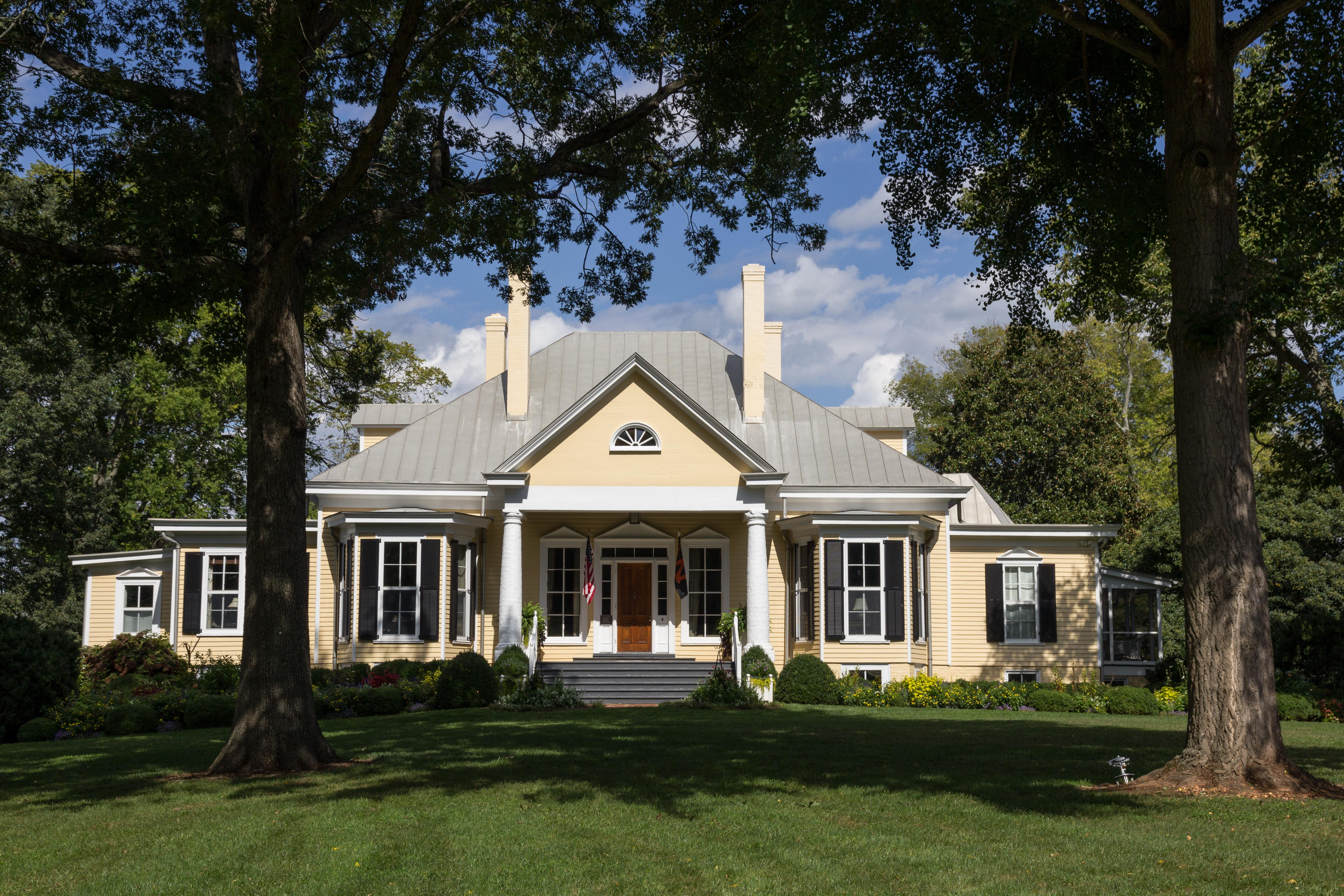

- Location within Virginia Location within the United States
- Location: Woodberry Forest School, Woodberry Forest, Virginia
- Coordinates: 38°17′32″N 78°7′8″W
- Area: 2 acres (0.81 ha)
- Built: 1793
- Architect: Jefferson, Thomas
- Architectural style: Federal
- NRHP reference No.: 79003052
- VLR No.: 056-0055

Significant dates
- Added to NRHP: June 19, 1979
- Designated VLR: February 26, 1979

The Residence, also known as Woodberry, is a historic home located on the grounds of Woodberry Forest School at Woodberry Forest, Madison County, Virginia. It was built in 1793, reputedly after the plans of Thomas Jefferson. In 1884, the house was extensively enlarged and altered. It is a 1 1/2-story, wood frame, Federal-style residence. The front facade features a pedimented Tuscan order portico. The house is covered with weatherboarding and is topped by its original hipped roof. Also on the property is the contributing smokehouse. The house was built for William Madison, brother of President James Madison.

It was listed on the National Register of Historic Places in 1979.
