= Todd G. Sears =

American businessman and activist

Todd Sears
- Born: Todd Gilliam Sears; 1976 (age 49–50); Tarboro, North Carolina, U.S.
- Education: Duke University (BA)
- Title: Founder & CEO of Out Leadership

Todd G. Sears (born 1976), American businessman and advocate for LGBTQ+ equality, is the founder and CEO of Out Leadership since 2010. A former investment banker and private banker, he has served as head of diversity strategy at Merrill Lynch from 2007 to 2008 and head of diversity and inclusion at Credit Suisse from 2008 to 2010. Sears started the first team of financial advisors focused on serving the needs of the LGBTQ community in Wall Street history.

== Early life and education ==
Todd Gilliam Sears was born and raised in North Carolina. His father, a veteran, worked as a CFO across the textile industry and his mother spent her career as a nurse, focusing on prenatal and postpartum care for women across North and South Carolina. Due to the volatility of the textile industry, the family moved several times throughout Todd's youth and he attended 9 schools before the Woodberry Forest School where he would go on to receive his high school diploma. He attended Duke University graduating with an A.B. in English, concentrating in medieval literature and poetry, with minors in economics and Spanish. He served as Quad Council president and started the tradition of Last Day of Classes – a full campus party at the end of term, now called LDOC. Sears was a member of the Kappa Alpha Order fraternity and a cappella group Speak of the Devil.

== Early career ==
Sears started as an investment banker at Schroeders in 1998, working as a transportation analyst, before joining DeSilva & Phillips as the vice president of business development in 1999, working on over 65 transactions. In 2001, Sears moved to Merrill Lynch as a financial advisor – the first openly gay financial advisor in Merrill Lynch's history. At Merrill Lynch, he created the first national team of financial advisors focused on serving the needs of the LGBTQ community. Through that effort, he conducted domestic partner planning seminars across the United States, addressing challenges that LGBTQ clients faced in estate-planning. Over the five years he was an Advisor, and then a Senior Financial Advisor, his team expanded to include 10 financial advisors in six cities, bringing in close to $2Billion worth of LGBTQ-identified assets to the firm. He was appointed division diversity manager for Merrill Lynch in 2007, and then was promoted to head of strategic initiatives at the Office of Diversity. During this time, he was awarded the Merrill Lynch Leadership in Diversity and Inclusion Award. Sears moved to Credit Suisse in 2008, becoming the head of diversity and inclusion for the Americas. At Credit Suisse, Sears created the first LGBTQ MBA recruiting program on Wall Street, “Open Perspectives, which won the HRC Innovation Award in 2010. He also supported the creation of the first Veterans network on Wall Street, which grew into VOWS (Veterans on Wall Street).

== Founding Out on the Street ==
In 2010, Sears was laid off from Credit Suisse, and used his severance check to start an LGBTQ-business Summit, called “Out on the Street,” a CEO-hosted gathering to discuss the business opportunity of LGBTQ equality. The first Summit, held March 30, 2011, was hosted by Seth Waugh, the Americas CEO of Deutsche Bank and was attended by senior leaders from Bank of America, Barclays, Citi, Deutsche Bank, Goldman Sachs, and Morgan Stanley. Reporters from ABC News, the Wall Street Journal, Bloomberg, and American Banker, among others, quoted Wall Street as the gay community's ally, for the first time.

In 2012, Out on the Street expanded to include several more firms, holding its second summit hosted by Bank of America Merrill Lynch. The initiative further expanded internationally that year, as over 180 senior members from 15 global financial institutions met in London, at the first summit of Out on the Street held outside of the United States. Receiving a welcome from the Lord Mayor, a letter of support from the U.S. secretary of state, a keynote by a high-ranking Balkan leader, the summit had an overwhelmingly positive response. Addressing topics including international LGBTQ talent mobility, the experiences of lesbians in financial services, and active allies, speakers – among which included Lord John Browne, James Leigh-Pemberton, CEO United Kingdom at Credit Suisse, Ambassador Michael Guest, and many more – recognized the role organizations played in advancing LGBTQ equality in the workplace and beyond.

Sears expanded Out on the Street to Hong Kong in 2013, the first-ever LGBTQ business summit in Asia, which was co-hosted by Antony Jenkins (CEO of Barclays) & Noel Quinn (CEO of HSBC Asia). Speakers discussed themes that were addressed in that year's New York City Summit, attesting to the global nature of challenges facing the LGBTQ community, but also discussed region-specific topics like that of culture and family pressures.

A secondary initiative, “Out in Law,” which sought to convene senior lawyers from across major law firms, was launched in 2014 – with the first “Out in Law” summit hosted by New York University Law School on March 13, 2014, including 28 participating law firms and over 200 attendees. The initiative aimed to bring together LGBTQ and straight ally leaders from the legal profession to discuss issues, network, and collectively set a forward-looking agenda for the legal community. Speakers like Lloyd Blankfein, chairman and CEO of Goldman Sachs at the time, Kevin Cathcart, the executive director of Lambda Legal, and Trevor Morrison, Dean of NYU School of Law, emphasized the goal of full equality for LGBTQ individuals.

Sears brought together over 130 senior LGBTQ and Ally business leaders from Australia and the Asia-Pacific region at the first Out Leadership Summit in Australia, hosted by HSBC Australia. At the inaugural summit on May 18, 2016, speakers like Kieran Moore, CEO of Ogilvy PR, Anthony Venn-Brown, CEO of Ambassadors & Bridge Builders International, and the Honourable Senator Penny Wong, discussed Australia's progress towards a more equal society for LGBTQ people, and how business has been involved in that progress forward.

== OutLeadership ==
Reflective of its reach beyond Wall Street, Out on the Street rebranded to OutLeadership, and developed several leadership initiatives as part of its mission to further LGBTQ progress, beginning with the creation of OutNEXT in partnership with McKinsey's Centered Leadership Program – the first ever global next generation program for emerging LGBTQ leaders. Hosted by Morgan Stanley on April 30, 2014, the summit convened leaders across industries and engaged attendees with interactive panel discussions, business case studies, and workshops to build leadership skills and create opportunities for networking.

In 2015, Out Leadership launched OutQUORUM, premiering a first-of-its-kind LGBTQ+ inclusive Board Diversity Policy for the United States with KPMG. The organization published the first-ever LGBTQ+ Board Diversity Guidelines for the United States so that any company who wanted to, could change its policy in ten minutes.

2016 marked a further expansion of the organization's many initiatives, as OutWOMEN was launched – championing the success of senior LGBTQ women in business. On February 4, 2016, the organization announced that the initiative would drive equality forward by organizing global engagement opportunities for LGBTQ women in significant leadership positions at major companies. In the first year of its launch, it convened a series of salon dinners in New York, Washington D.C., Chicago, Atlanta, Los Angeles, London, and Hong Kong. It functioned through several of the summits Out Leadership hosted that year in New York, Hong Kong, and London, hosting breakfasts open to younger women and allies of the group.

== Philanthropy ==
Sears serves on various nonprofit boards, including the Williams Institute of UCLA, the Palette Fund, the Global Equality Fund of the U.S. Department of State, Lambda Legal Defense & Education Fund, The North Carolina Community Foundation and the National Advisory Council of the Stonewall National Archives & Museum.

Sears holds an integral role in several events Lambda Legal, a national organization committed to achieving full recognition of the civil rights of lesbians, gay men, bisexuals, transgender people, and everyone living with HIV through impact litigation, education and public work, has organized. Since 2003, the year Lambda Legal won Lawrence v. Texas, Sears has hosted Lambda in the Pines, the longest running LGBTQ fundraiser in the United States.

Sears is the founding co-chair of Jeffrey Fashion Cares New York, a fashion show fundraiser created in tandem with namesake Jeffrey Kalinsky – over the 10 years Sears led the event, it raised over $8 million for LGBTQ+ / HIV causes, with recipients including Lambda Legal, Hetrick Martin Institute, GMHC, the Point Foundation, and ACRIA.

== Awards and honors ==
In 2014, Sears was awarded the My Hero Award by Aid for AIDS International, which recognizes individuals who have made a significant impact on the lives of people living with HIV. That year, he also received the Empire State Pride Agenda Foundation's 2014 Equality at Work Award, presented in recognition of his leadership and commitment to advancing rights for LGBTQ professionals and working to elevate equality in the workplace.

In 2015, Sears received the Paula L. Ettelbrick Award, which celebrates the unparalleled achievement by an individual or an organization in advancing lesbian, gay, bisexual, and transgender attorneys.

In 2018, Sears was presented the AGLCC's (Atlanta Gay & Lesbian Chamber of Commerce) Vanguard Award, recognizing him as an LGBTQ advocate visible on the National and/or Global stage, having pioneered new territory in the business community while advocating for inclusion, equality and greater access to opportunity for LGBTQ individuals.

In 2019, Sears was awarded the Duke Alumni Association's Beyond Duke Award, in recognition of his service to the Duke community, his city, and the world, through his involvement in Out Leadership.

Sears has been listed on Crain's Notable LGBTQ leaders for several years, having been on the list in 2020, 2021, 2022, and 2024. The list recognizes people who are pacesetters that drive equity and inclusion across city business.

== Publications ==
Sears has published several articles across various platforms, including the Huffington Post, Harvard Business Review, the South China Morning Post, and Forbes.

- Huffington Post, Hong Kong's Religious Pluralism Offers a Model for Diversity in the Special Administrative Region, 2015
- Huffington Post, Room at the Table: Remembering Bayard Rustin's Legacy on Martin Luther King, Jr. Day, 2016
- Huffington Post, As the World's Attention Turns to Brazil, Companies in Brazil Have an Historic Opportunity to Demonstrate LGBT Inclusion, 2016
- Huffington Post, Nathan Deal Faces Stark Choice: Partisanship or Prosperity?, 2016
- New York Slant, Expanding LGBT Diversity on Corporate Boards is Good for Business, 2016
- "Protecting Employees Where Being Gay is a Crime". New Zealand Herald. 2016.
- B The Change, Inspirational Business Leaders Write About the Necessity of an Inclusive Economy - B The Change Media, 2017
- South China Morning Post, It’s time for laws that protect workers of all sexual orientations in Hong Kong, 2017
- The Advocate Magazine, Why Is Fortune Magazine Honoring Antigay Companies Like Publix?, 2018
- Pensions & Investments, Commentary: Get on board – it's time for investors to include LGBT people in board diversity, 2018
- Forbes, The Human Power of Corporate Pride, 2019
- Forbes, Learning From Ben Carson’s Prejudice: How Leaders Should Talk About Transgender People, 2019
- Pensions & Investments, Commentary: Get on board - it's time for investors to include LGBT people in board diversity, 2019
- Omaha World-Herald, Todd Sears: Cate Folsom leaves an important World-Herald legacy, 2020
- Forbes, Why It's High Time The Law Protects LGBT+ Citizens, 2020
- Forbes, The Power of Purpose in Corporate Strategy, 2020
- Forbes, How Larry Kramer Was ‘The Destiny Of Me’, 2020
- Forbes, All Eyes On California This Wednesday: AB-979 Could Alter Corporate Boards For The Better, 2020
- Third Sector News, Additional funding to deliver specialist orthoses to more children, org says, 2021
- Third Sector News, Law firm joins federation working to improve LGBTIQ+ living conditions, 2021
- Forbes, Dispelling Myths On The Barriers To Minority Representation On Corporate Boards, 2021
- Forbes, No One Ever Changed Their Mind Because You Called Them A “Bigot”, 2022
- Forbes, Attacking ESG: A Strategy That’s Doomed To Fail, 2024
- HR Daily Advisor, Progress and Potential: The Evolution of the Global Workplace for LGBTQ+ Employees, 2024
- Harvard Business Review, Why Companies Must Recommit to the Fight for LGBTQ+ Rights, 2024
- Infobae, Por qué las empresas deben comprometerse de nuevo con la lucha por los derechos LGBTQ+, 2024
- Economic waves and 'rainbow washing': Thailand’s same-sex marriage Bill brings business opportunities and challenges, say experts, 2024
