= The Citadel =

Military college in Charleston, South Carolina, US

The Citadel Military College of South Carolina
- Former name: South Carolina Military Academy
- Motto: Honor • Duty • Respect
- Type: Public senior military college
- Established: 1842; 184 years ago
- Founder: John Peter Richardson II
- Academic affiliations: Sea-grant
- Endowment: $461.9 million (2025)
- President: GEN Kenneth F. McKenzie Jr., USMC (Ret.)
- Provost: BG Sally C. Selden, SCM
- Commandant of Cadets: COL Thomas J. Gordon, USMC, (Ret.)
- Faculty: 225
- Students: 3,721
- Postgraduates: 1,026
- Location: Charleston, South Carolina, United States; 32°47′50″N 79°57′40″W
- Campus: Urban, 300 acres (121 ha)
- Colors: Infantry blue and white
- Nickname: Bulldogs
- Sporting affiliations: NCAA Division I – SoCon
- Mascots: Spike; Live Mascots: General 3 (affectionately known as G3)
- Website: citadel.edu

The Citadel Military College of South Carolina (simply known as the Citadel) is a public senior military college in Charleston, South Carolina, United States. Established in 1842, it is the third oldest of the six senior military colleges in the United States. The Citadel was initially established as two schools to educate young men from around the state, while simultaneously protecting the South Carolina State Arsenals in both Columbia and Charleston.

Academics at the Citadel are divided into six schools: Business, Education, Engineering, Humanities and Social Sciences, Science, and Mathematics. Bachelor's degrees are offered in 38 major programs of study with 55 minors. The military program is made up of cadets pursuing bachelor's degrees who live on campus. For traditional students, the Citadel offers non-military programs including 12 undergraduate degrees, 26 graduate degrees, as well as evening and online programs with seven online graduate degrees, three online undergraduate degrees, and three certificate programs. Approximately 1,495 non-cadet students are enrolled in Citadel Graduate College pursuing undergraduate and graduate degrees.

The South Carolina Corps of Cadets makes up half the student body of the school and numbers 2,226. Cadet life is devised into a "class system" which focuses on the development of Cadets as both students and leaders. The Corps contains its own unique traditions, lexicon, and rank structures. One-third of graduates each year go into the armed services. All members of the Corps are required to participate in ROTC, with all branches' (Army, Navy, Marine Corps, Air Force, Space Force, and Coast Guard) training programs being represented. The Citadel Bulldogs field 9 men's teams, 7 women's teams, and 1 mixed team (rifle) at the NCAA Division I level.

Graduates of the Citadel's Corps of Cadets are known as "the Long Gray Line", modeled after the United States Military Academy tradition. Graduates of the Citadel Graduate College are considered part of the alumni organization, but with a distinct variant of the Citadel's class ring. Alumni of the Citadel include numerous generals, senators, athletes and writers. Two Medal of Honor and two Navy Cross recipients have attended the Citadel, and six alumni have risen to become state governors.

== History ==
Presidents of The Citadel
Captain William F. Graham, USA	1843–1844
Major Richard W. Colcock, USA	1844–1852
Major Francis W. Capers, CSA	1852–1859
Major Peter F. Stevens, SCM	1859–1861
Major James B. White, SCM	1861–1865
Colonel John P. Thomas, CSA	1882–1885
BrigGen George D. Johnston, CSA	1885–1890
Colonel Asbury Coward, CSA	1890–1908
Colonel Oliver J. Bond, SCM	1908–1931
General Charles P. Summerall, USA	1931–1953
Colonel Louis S. LeTellier, SCM	1953–1954 (Interim)
General Mark W. Clark, USA	1954–1965
General Hugh P. Harris, USA	1965–1970
MajGen James A. Duckett, SCM '32	1970–1974
LtGen George M. Seignious, USA '42	1974–1979
MajGen Wallace Anderson, SCM	1979 (Interim)
VADM James B. Stockdale, USN	1979–1980
MajGen James Grimsley, Jr., USA '42	1980–1989
LtGen Cladius E. Watts, USAF '58	1989–1996
BrigGen Roger C. Poole, USAR '59	1996–1997 (Interim)
MajGen John S. Grinalds, USMC	1997–2005
BrigGen Roger C. Poole, USAR '59	2005–2006 (Interim)
LtGen John W. Rosa, Jr., USAF '73	2006–2018
LtGen John B. Sams, USAF '67	2018 (Interim)
Gen Glenn M. Walters, USMC '79	2018–2026
Gen Kenneth F. McKenzie Jr., USMC '79	2026-present

The Citadel traces its origins to an arsenal constructed by state authorities in South Carolina to defend white residents of Charleston, South Carolina against possible slave rebellions following Denmark Vesey's thwarted uprising of 1822. The school was founded by an act of the state legislature in 1842 as the South Carolina Military Academy and classes began at the Arsenal (Columbia) in 1843. It originally consisted of the Citadel Academy in Charleston and the Arsenal Academy in Columbia. The Arsenal was burned by General Sherman's forces during the American Civil War and never reopened. The Citadel Academy was occupied by Union troops in 1865 and reopened as an educational institution in 1882. During the Civil War, the SCMA Corps of Cadets was organized into a military unit known as the Battalion of State Cadets which took part in nine engagements. In January 1861, Citadel Academy cadets manning a battery on Morris Island fired the first shots of the conflict when they shelled the Union steamship Star of the West which was attempting to resupply Fort Sumter. In December 1864, the cadet battalion made up more than a third of a Confederate force that defended a strategic rail line during the Battle of Tulifinny. The Citadel was awarded nine battle streamers for service in the Civil War and is one of only five American colleges to receive a battle streamer for the participation of its student body in wartime service. The four other institutes are: VMI for the Battle of New Market, Florida State for the Battle of Natural Bridge, William and Mary for the Siege of Yorktown, and the University of Hawaii for the Hawaiian Islands Campaign.

In 1922, the school moved from its original location on Marion Square in downtown Charleston to a new campus on the banks of the Ashley River on the northwest side of the city. The Citadel has grown steadily from an enrollment of 460 to its present 3,500. During World War II, the Citadel had the highest percentage of any American college student body serving in the military and all but 346 of its living graduates were members of the armed forces. Alumni served as members of the Flying Tigers and Doolittle Raiders; 280 died in the service of their country. The first black cadet enrolled in 1966. The first woman to graduate from the Citadel, Maxine Hudson, received her degree from the graduate program in 1969. Maxine was a distinguished and beloved teacher in Charleston for over 50 years. In 1971 the first Native American (Oglala and Comanche), Kim Winkelman, graduated. The first woman admitted to the Corps of Cadets program was Shannon Faulkner. After a two-and-a-half-year court battle, she matriculated into the otherwise all-male Corps of Cadets on August 15, 1995, but soon withdrew after she said she and her family received dozens of death threats and her parents' home was vandalized. In 1999, Nancy Mace, daughter of the Citadel's Commandant of Cadets, became the first woman to graduate from the Corps of Cadets program, receiving a degree in business administration. In 2018, the Citadel appointed Sarah Zorn the first woman to lead the South Carolina Corps of Cadets as Regimental Commander.

A graduate program was started in 1968. A major capital improvement campaign started in 1989 saw the replacement or extensive renovation of a majority of the buildings on campus, and academic offerings have been continuously expanded to offer in demand courses and degrees in fields such as Mechanical Engineering, Computer Science, Cybersecurity, Criminal Justice and Nursing. Citadel cadets and alumni have served in every United States military action from the Mexican War to the current global war on terrorism.

== Academics ==
=== Schools ===
During the 2002–03 academic year, the Citadel reorganized its existing departments into five schools, each headed by a dean. The schools comprise Business; Education; Engineering; Humanities and Social Sciences; and Science and Mathematics.

==== Business ====
The Baker School of Business consists of three departments: Accounting and Finance; Management and Entrepreneurship; and Marketing, Supply Chain Management, and Economics. The school offers undergraduate and graduate degrees in Business Administration. Accredited by the Association to Advance Collegiate Schools of Business since 1996, more cadets major in Business Administration than any other major. The MBA program is also the largest of the Citadel's graduate programs. On February 22, 2017, the Citadel announced that Tommy Baker, who attended as a veteran student after serving in the Marine Corps, and his wife, Victoria, had made a gift to endow business programs, and that the school would be named in their honor. In January 2021, the school relocated from Bond Hall to Bastin Hall, a newly constructed academic building named for Rick and Mary Lee Bastin. Bastin Hall is the first new academic building added to the campus since 1974.

==== Education ====
The Zucker Family School of Education houses undergraduate and graduate education programs in several specialties. On November 11, 2014, the Citadel named its School of Education for the Zucker Family, after Anita Zucker made a $4 million (equivalent to $5.44 million in 2025) donation to the school for its education programs. The school is currently located in Capers Hall, but will relocate to Bond Hall upon the completion of Bastin Hall.

==== Engineering ====
The School of Engineering consists of four departments: Civil and Environmental Engineering; Electrical and Computer Engineering; Engineering Leadership and Program Management; and Mechanical Engineering. The school, which claims to be the fifth oldest such program in the nation, has long offered undergraduate degrees in both Civil and Electrical Engineering. In 2014, the school added a Bachelor of Science in Mechanical Engineering program and, in 2015, added 13 additional degree and certificate programs, including master's degrees in Civil, Electrical, and Mechanical Engineering. In 2018, the school added a Bachelor of Science in Construction Engineering program. The school is located in Letellier Hall (Civil and Mechanical Engineering) and Grimsley Hall (Electrical Engineering). In 2016, U.S. News & World Report ranked the Citadel's School of Engineering 13th among all undergraduate engineering programs without doctoral degrees in the United States making it the sixth straight year that the school has been in the Top 25.

==== Humanities and Social Sciences ====
The School of Humanities and Social Sciences consists of seven departments: Criminal Justice; English; History; Intelligence and Security Studies; Modern Languages, Literatures, and Cultures; Political Science; and Psychology. The school offers seven majors (with multiple concentrations) and 19 minors, and awards more than 50% of the credit hours earned at the Citadel. For graduate work, the school offers five degree programs and three certificates, including cybersecurity and intelligence analysis. These programs resulted in the school being named a National Center of Academic Excellence in Cyber Defense by the National Security Agency. The school is located in Capers Hall, which was recently rebuilt and modernized.

David L. Preston, Westvaco Professor of National Security Studies in the History Department, in 2015 won the Guggenheim-Lehrman Prize in Military History and the 2016 Distinguished Book Award from the Society for Military History for his book, Braddock's Defeat: The Battle of the Monongahela and the Road to Revolution.

==== Science and Mathematics ====
The Swain Family School of Science and Mathematics consists of seven departments: Biology; Chemistry; Cyber and Computer Sciences; Health and Human Performance; Mathematical Sciences; Physics; and the Swain Department of Nursing. The school, along with the Zucker Family School of Education and the School of Engineering, sponsor the STEM (Science, Technology, Engineering, and Math) Center of Excellence, which hosts a variety of events throughout the year, including the annual Storm the Citadel week featuring a trebuchet competition. On June 1, 2018, the Citadel announced the naming of the school for the Swain Family, in recognition of major gifts provided by brothers David C. Swain, Jr., Class of 1980, and his wife, Mary, as well as Dr. Christopher C. Swain, Class of 1981, and his, wife Debora.

=== Academic programs ===
In addition to the Corps of Cadets residential day military program, the Citadel offers several degree options to non-cadets, such as targeting active duty military, veterans, and civilians in both classroom and distance-learning online settings.

==== Corps of Cadets ====
The South Carolina Corps of Cadets is a residential, full-time program in a military environment. Focusing on educating the "whole person," membership in the Corps of Cadets is for students who want a military environment while pursuing a full-time undergraduate degrees.

==== Graduate College ====
The Citadel offers evening and online programs under the banner of the Citadel Graduate College (CGC), (Note: In 2007, the Citadel changed its graduate program's name from the College of Graduate and Professional Studies (CGPS) to the Citadel Graduate College (CGC).) serving the Lowcountry by offering regionally and professionally accredited bachelor's, master's and specialist degrees as well as certificate programs scheduled around the student's profession, family and lifestyle. The CGC offers over 25 graduate programs with over 15 concentration options, over 25 graduate certificate programs, and 12 college transfer programs. Some programs are offered through the Lowcountry Graduate Center consortium in North Charleston, South Carolina.

==== College Transfer Programs ====
The Citadel Graduate College offers 12 majors within nine degree programs to anyone, regardless of military status within its College Transfer program. There are two different paths within the College Transfer Program structure: 2+2 transfer programs and degree completion programs. The 2+2 programs allow students to complete their first two years of study at an accredited college or university, then transfer those credits to the Citadel for the final two years to complete their degree through the Citadel's evening on-campus program. Six majors are offered in the 2+2 program: civil engineering (BSCE), computer engineering (BSCompE), construction engineering (BSConE), electrical engineering (BSEE), mechanical engineering (BSME), and nursing (BSN). The Degree Completion programs allow students to begin once they have earned a minimum of 24 academic credit hours in general education courses. A combination of evening on-campus and online formats are available and six majors are offered in the Degree Completion program: business administration (BSBA), criminal justice (BA), intelligence and security studies (BA), political science (BA), social studies education (BS), and tactical strength and conditioning (BS).

==== Enlisted Commissioning Programs ====
The Citadel is home to Enlisted Commissioning Programs for the Navy and Marine Corps. The first Marine Enlisted Commissioning Education Program (MECEP) in the nation was established at the Citadel in 1973. Navy enlisted members attend as part of the Seaman to Admiral (STA-21) Program. Participants in these programs attend day classes with cadets in their service uniform, including ROTC, but are not required to live on campus.

=== Leadership training ===
==== ROTC ====
All cadets are required to undergo at least two years of ROTC training in one of the four branches of the armed services that offer ROTC programs (the Coast Guard does not have such a program), but they are not required to enter military service after graduation unless on ROTC scholarship or contract. Approximately 35% of Citadel Cadets are commissioned upon graduation.

==== U.S. Coast Guard Auxiliary University Program ====
In addition to their required ROTC course, cadets interested in pursuing a career with the United States Coast Guard can join the Citadel's Coast Guard Auxiliary University Program (AUP). Originally established as the Citadel Coast Guard Society in 2007 and officially designated as Coast Guard Auxiliary Flotilla 12-8a Citadel Detachment in 2008, the Citadel's AUP is one of the first in the nation. The purpose of the unit is to orient and educate cadets on service options within the United States Coast Guard, to include Direct Commissions, Officer Candidate School (OCS), active duty and reserve enlistments, and continued service with the auxiliary.

==== Krause Center for Leadership and Ethics ====
Established with a gift from L. William Krause '63, the Krause Center for Leadership and Ethics offers symposiums, classes and training seminars to help instill the principles of leadership, ethics, morals and service. A minor in leadership studies is also sponsored through this program. Training is conducted each year for freshmen and sophomores on honor and ethics. Leadership classes are also given to cadets in the senior chain of command. The institute also sponsors programs that offer cadets an opportunity to perform community service and instill a sense of commitment to one's fellow man.

==== Cadet Officer Leadership School ====
Selected members of Air Force JROTC units from the Southeastern United States cadets are eligible to spend a week at the Citadel for officer training for their home JROTC units. A routine day attending Cadet Officer Leadership School (COLS) begins with waking up to Reveille for morning PT, the remainder of the day is uniform wear and inspection, two classes and constant regulation drill. On the day of graduation from the school, cadets participate in a "pass in review" ceremony where awards and decorations are given to certain cadets who have gone above the normal standards.

=== Rankings ===
Academic rankings

Master's
- Washington Monthly: 29

Regional
- U.S. News & World Report: 2

National
- Forbes: 201

- In 2022, for the twelfth consecutive year, U.S. News & World Report ranked the Citadel highest among master's degree offering public institutions in the "Regional Universities – South" category and second out of all 136 universities (public and private) in the same category; the school was also ranked first in Best College for Veterans, sixth in Best Undergraduate Teaching, and tenth in Most Innovative Schools (all within the “Regional Universities – South” category). defined as those institutions offering "a full range of undergrad programs and some master's programs". U.S. News & World Report also ranked the undergraduate engineering program 16th nationally among schools offering up to a master's degree.
- Money magazine's 2022 college ratings rank the Citadel 78th out of 744 U.S. colleges for affordability, scholarship availability, average student debt, graduation rate, and average graduate earnings.
- Forbes ranked the Citadel 201st out of the top 500 rated private and public colleges and universities in America for the 2024-25 report. The Citadel was also ranked 93rd among Public colleges and 47th in the south. For the 2019 report, the Citadel was 122nd on the list of America's Best Value Colleges.
- In 2016 The Economist magazine ranked the Citadel 94th out of nearly 1,300 U.S. colleges for average earnings of graduates.
- The Citadel in 2012 ranked 25th out of all U.S. public colleges in four-year graduation rate. As of 2015, the four-year graduation rate is 63% compared to a national average of 30%; the six-year rate is 72%.

== Cadet life ==
Undergraduate demographics as of Fall 2023
Race and ethnicity	Total
White	74%
Hispanic	9%
Black	7%
Two or more races	5%
Asian	2%
International student	1%
Unknown	1%
Economic diversity
Low-income (Note: The percentage of students who received an income-based federal Pell grant intended for low-income students.)	20%
Affluent (Note: The percentage of students who are a part of the American middle class at the bare minimum.)	80%

Undergraduate students desiring to join the South Carolina Corps of Cadets must meet physical fitness and SAT/ACT testing standards for acceptance. On occasion, waivers to height/weight standards can be granted upon successful completion of the physical training test. On most days, cadets have both morning and afternoon physical (fitness) training, called "PT", military instruction on leadership, weapons, drill, and discipline, in addition to their regular college classes. Most weekdays start with a formal muster and inspection of all personnel and their rooms. Cadets then march to structured military meals. After a day spent in classes, sports and other activities, the day usually ends with an evening muster formation and mandatory evening study period during which there is enforced quiet time and all cadets are required to be in the barracks, library or academic buildings. Cadets may not be married and must live on campus in the barracks with their assigned company for all four years. Cadets are restricted to campus during the week, but are allowed general leave on weekends and have limited but gradually escalating privileges for weekend and overnight passes. The Corps of Cadets employs a Fourth Class System in which first-year students have few rights on campus, must recite quotations and school facts to upperclassmen on command, and must obey any legal order from an upper-class cadet. The Citadel emphasizes a strict disciplinary and physical fitness indoctrination for fourth-class cadets, who are sometimes called "knobs" because of the shaved heads of the males, which they previously had to maintain until the spring when they were then recognized as fourth-class cadets. The haircut policy changed starting with the 2019–2020 academic year, where fourth-class male cadets only have to shave their heads during their initial week but can otherwise have hair as long as Department of Defense regulations allow it.

First-year cadets arrive on campus before the start of the academic year for Challenge Week, a period of intense training and physical trials that is informally referred to as "Hell Week." According to the Citadel, the Fourth Class System "creates the discipline and instills the core values of Honor, Duty, and Respect which is expected of principled leaders in all walks of life. It is deliberately and appropriately stressful while always remaining positive, professional, and purposeful." Despite such assurances, Citadel administrators have had to take steps to eliminate hazing; the practice of hazing is defined and condemned in a Citadel manual, and cadets are required to sign a "Statement Requirement to Report Hazing" upon enrollment. As a Citadel commandant, Marine Corps. Col. Leo Mercado admonished cadets against hazing in 2009: "Some of the things you think are traditions are just bad habits, and most of those bad habits are abuse." Numerous first-year cadets have been abused and seriously injured under the Fourth Class System, and some faculty and alumni have called for the college to adopt a modern disciplinary system in line with the U.S. service academies.

Cadets who accumulate too many demerits or breach regulations can be punished by serving confinements or tours. A tour is one hour spent marching in the barracks with a rifle at shoulder arms and is normally performed when a cadet would otherwise be permitted to leave campus. Confinement is one hour spent in a cadet's room when they would normally be permitted to leave campus.

Included in the Citadel Graduate College are active duty Navy and Marine Corps enlisted personnel attending the Citadel under the Seaman To Admiral program (STA-21) and the Marine Enlisted Commissioning Education Program (MECEP), which originated at the Citadel in 1973.

=== The Regimental Band and Pipes ===
Established in 1909, the Regimental Band is one of the twenty-one companies that comprise the current Corps and is a prominent feature at every formal parade. Prospective members must pass an audition. None of the band's members are music majors, as the Citadel does not offer such a major, yet the band and pipes enjoy an international reputation. The Band and Pipes made their inaugural appearance at the Edinburgh Military Tattoo in 1991 and were the only group from the United States to perform that year. Selected again by the Director of the Royal Edinburgh Military Tattoo in Scotland to represent the United States at the 2010 Silver Jubilee Tattoo, the Citadel Regimental Band and Pipes performed their seven-minute segment of the Jubilee program in August 2010 as well as performing as part of the massed pipes and massed bands. Selected for a third time to represent the United States at the 2015 Tattoo, the Regimental Band performed the opening fanfare for the Tattoo's theme "East meets West" as well as the massed bands finale. Combined with the Citadel pipe band, their own seven-minute segment of the show featured musical numbers reflecting a wide variety of uniquely American music. The Band and Pipes will return to perform again at the Tattoo in 2020, broadcast on the BBC it is viewed by more than 100 Million people in 30 countries across Europe and Scandinavia.

The Citadel Pipe Band, established by General Mark W. Clark in 1955, is one of the few college bagpipe bands in the country and it performs at the weekly parade at the Citadel, as well as at numerous other public events. The Citadel Regimental Band participated in the Presidential Inaugural parade in 1953, and again combined with the pipe band in the inaugural parades of 1961, 1985 and 2017.

In the summer of 2013, the Band and Pipes performed as the United States representative at the week-long Royal Nova Scotia International Tattoo in Halifax, Canada.

=== Summerall Guards ===
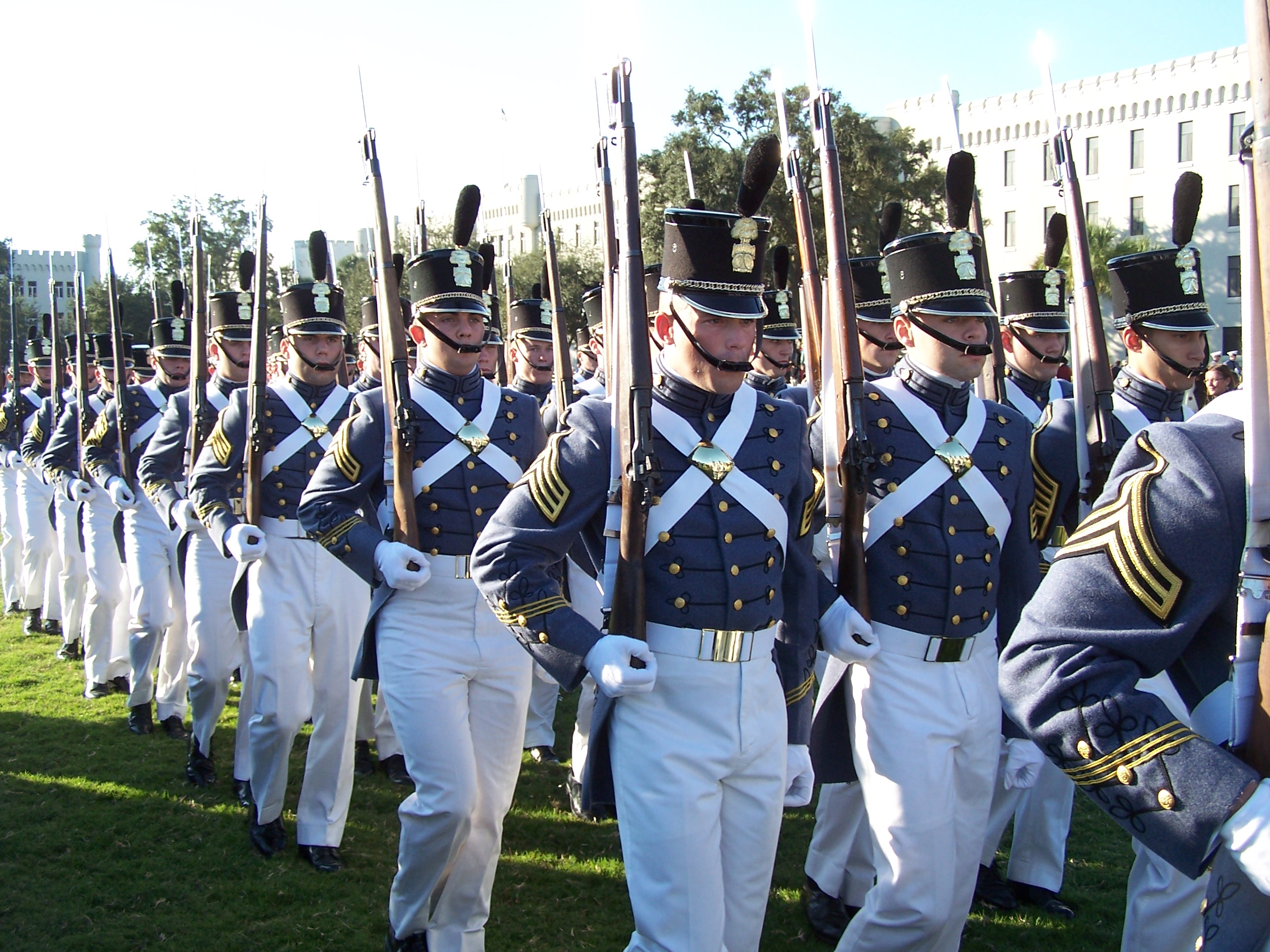
The Summerall Guards performing the Citadel Series.

The Summerall Guards is a silent drill team consisting of 61 cadets chosen each spring from the junior class. Founded in 1932, the team performs a routine called the Citadel Series that has changed very little from its inception and has never been written down. The Guards have performed at numerous high-profile events around the United States, including four presidential inaugurations, the National Cherry Blossom Festival, Mardi Gras in New Orleans, and at several NFL games.

=== Honors Program ===
An Honors Program is available for cadets with exceptional academic standing and includes a core curriculum of honors courses conducted by the most highly rated faculty members, small seminars, and classes conducted in a discussion-type forum that encourages intellectual advancement. The program accepts 25 cadets per year through a competitive process, and they are awarded scholarships. The program also assists the most highly qualified cadets in applying for scholarships, grants, and merit-based internships; since 1992 the Citadel has produced 21 Fulbright Scholars and three Truman Scholars. A Fulbright Chair is set to be established in the School of Humanities and Social Sciences in the fall 2020 semester.

The Honors Program also administers external study programs, including those abroad and in Washington, D.C. Each year, cadets participate in study abroad programs in numerous foreign countries, a semester-long internship program in Washington, D.C. allows cadets an opportunity to work at various government agencies and in the offices of congressmen and senators. Summer internship programs are available in many cities with major United States corporations.

=== Student newspaper ===
The Brigadier is a student newspaper at the Citadel. The newspaper is primarily published in blog form, with printed copies for major events during the school year. Established in 1924 as The Bull Dog, the publication changed to its present name during the presidency of General Mark W. Clark. Until 2018, print editions were published biweekly from September through April by the Department of Cadet Activities, with free editions available on campus and mail subscriptions available for a nominal fee. Beginning in 2018–19, the newspaper moved to an online-only online format.

== Athletics ==
The Citadel competes in NCAA Division I and has been a member of the Southern Conference since 1936; the school mascot is the Bulldog. Men's intercollegiate sports are football, basketball, baseball, wrestling, cross country, indoor and outdoor track, rifle, tennis, and golf; women's intercollegiate sports are volleyball, soccer, cross country, indoor and outdoor track, rifle, and golf. Numerous club sports include lacrosse, rugby, pistol, sailing, crew, ice hockey, and triathlon.

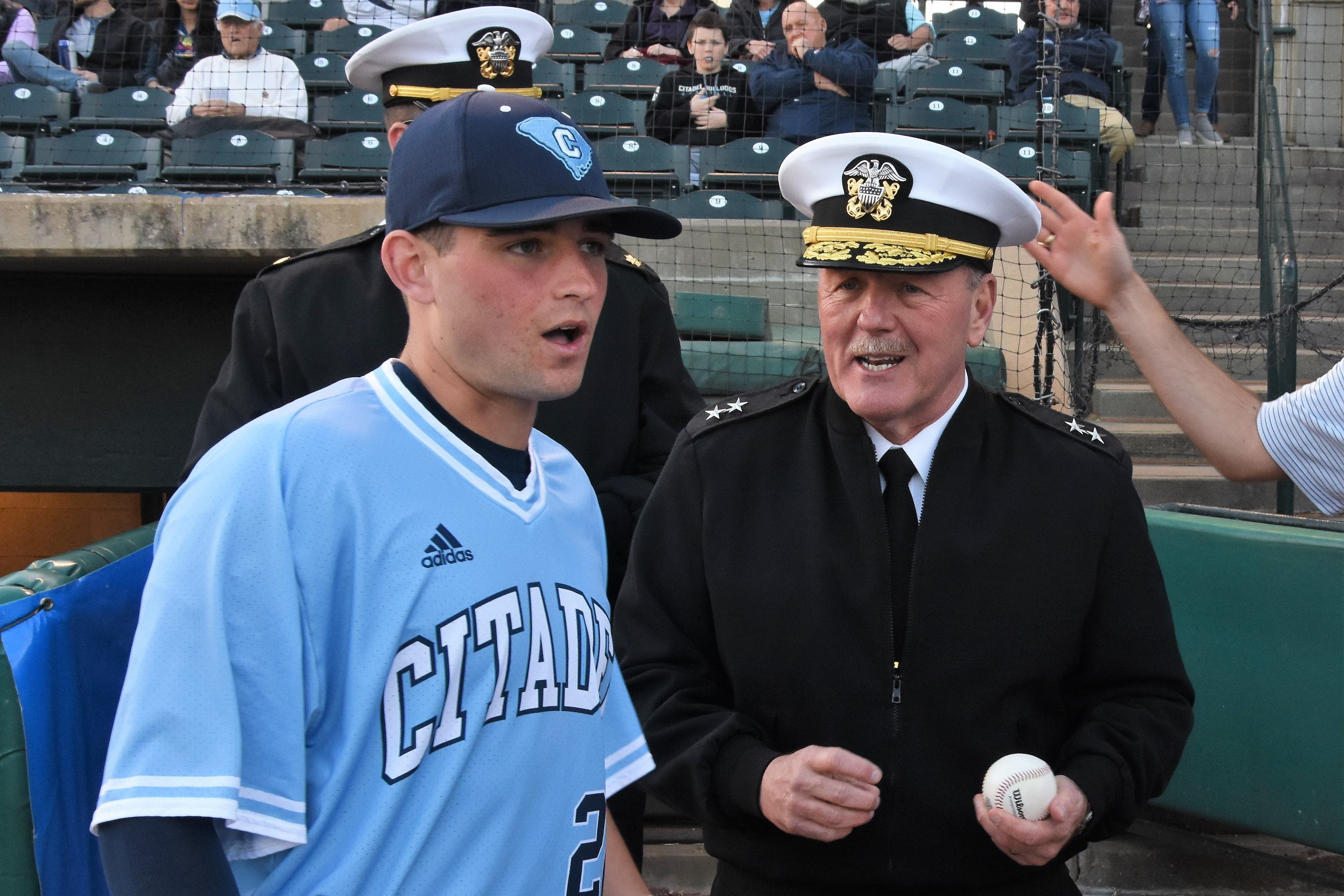
A Bulldogs baseball player with a United States Navy Rear Admiral in 2019

The Citadel Bulldogs baseball team has won 20 Southern Conference regular season and tournament championships, most recently in 2010; 43 players have been selected in the MLB draft The 1990 team won the Atlantic Regional, earning the school its first trip to the College World Series (CWS) and finishing the season ranked sixth in the final Collegiate Baseball poll with a record of 46–14; they also became the first military school to play in the CWS. Numerous alumni have played in the major leagues in recent years, recently retired Head Coach Fred Jordan '79 is the school and conference's winningest with 831 victories.

The football team has won four Southern Conference Championships and appeared in the Football Championship Subdivision playoffs five times; the 1960 team defeated Tennessee Tech 27–0 in the Tangerine Bowl. The 1992 squad went 11–2 and finished the regular season ranked #1 in the I-AA poll. The 2015 team recorded nine wins including a victory over South Carolina and four players were named to All-America teams. The 2016 squad had a 10-game win streak and won the outright Conference Championship. As of 2010 the football program had a graduation success rate of 90% compared to the Division I average of 65% Several alumni have played in the professional ranks including wide receiver and All-Pro return specialist Andre Roberts of the Los Angeles Chargers; cornerback Cortez Allen recently played five seasons with the Pittsburgh Steelers. Fullback Nehemiah Broughton played with the Washington Redskins, Arizona Cardinals and New York Giants; fullback Travis Jervey was an All-Pro and member of the 1996 Super Bowl Champion Green Bay Packers; kicker Greg Davis had a 12-year career with several teams including Arizona and the Atlanta Falcons. ESPN color commentator Paul Maguire was a tight end and punter for three AFL champions with the Buffalo Bills and former St. Louis/Phoenix Cardinals running back Lyvonia "Stump" Mitchell has been a head coach at two Division I colleges and served as an NFL assistant for Seattle, Washington, Arizona and the New York Jets. Current NFL players also include cornerback Dee Delaney of the Tampa Bay Buccaneers and wide receiver Raleigh Webb of the New England Patriots.

The wrestling team has sent 68 members to the NCAA tournament and produced four All-Americans.

Completed in 2005, the Inouye Marksmanship Center is utilized by cadets, law enforcement and the South Carolina National Guard. The Citadel Bulldogs rifle team has won four national championships (two team and two individual); Cadet Stephen Bowden was the 2013 National Individual Pistol Champion

For the 2018–19 school year seven of the 13 sports team had a perfect Academic Progress Rate (APR) of 1,000; five of the remaining six were well above the multi year threshold score of 930.

== Traditions ==
=== The Honor Code ===
One of the core values of the Citadel is an Honor Code that mandates that all students, both cadets and non-cadets, not lie, cheat, steal or tolerate those who do. A cadet-run Honor Court investigates all alleged violations and conducts trials for cadets. The penalty may result in expulsion, although recommendations for leniency may be forwarded to the President of the college for consideration. For non-cadets, a council of faculty and students enforces the code. While the codes are identical for cadets and non-cadets, they are administered separately and the range of sanctions for non-cadets varies from restitution to expulsion.

=== Class rings ===
Both cadet and non-cadet students from the Citadel are entitled to wear the school's ring as a symbol of their accomplishments. First-class cadets, veteran students, and active duty military students receive their class rings at a special ring presentation ceremony which was previously held in the college's chapel, but which now takes place in the school's field house.

Non-cadets first attended the Citadel in the 1940s, as former cadets who resigned from the Corps of Cadets returned to finish their studies after World War II, and for decades their status in regards to wearing a class ring remained ambiguous. First officially approved to wear the ring in 1985, non-cadet students may purchase a ring which closely resembles the cadet ring, but with slight variations in the design design, namely by omitting the phrase "Military College of South Carolina." Non-cadet rings instead feature an inscription of "The Citadel."

As of 2026, both cadet and non-cadet Citadel rings are made only in 10 karat white gold with no gem stone. The design does not change with each class with the exception of the class year.

== Campus ==
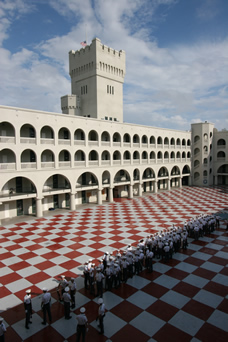
Checkerboard Quadrangle of Padgett-Thomas Barracks

The Citadel sits on a 300-acre (120 ha) tract of land on the Ashley River just to the northwest of downtown Charleston. There are 27 buildings, built in a Spanish Moorish style, grouped around a 10-acre (4.0 ha) grass parade ground. The buildings around the parade ground include ten classroom buildings, an administration building, five barracks, mess hall, a student activities building, chapel, library, a yacht club, a marksmanship center, a field house, faculty/staff housing area, and various support facilities including a laundry, cadet store, tailor shop, and power plant. The campus is bounded to the west by the Ashley River, to the north by the Wagener Terrace neighborhood, to the east by Hampton Park and the Hampton Park Terrace neighborhood, and to the South by the Westside Neighborhood.

Just off the main campus are Johnson Hagood Stadium, a baseball stadium, and an alumni center. Additionally, the college owns a large beach house facility located near the north end of the Isle of Palms.

=== Padgett-Thomas Barracks ===
Padgett-Thomas Barracks, the first building constructed on campus and completely rebuilt in 2004, faces the center of the parade ground and dominates the campus with its 109 feet (33 m) tower, distinguishing it from all other barracks and buildings on campus. Home to one of the five battalions of the South Carolina Corps of Cadets, the Regimental Band and Pipes, and Regimental Staff, the barracks has space to house up to 560 cadets.

=== Summerall Chapel ===
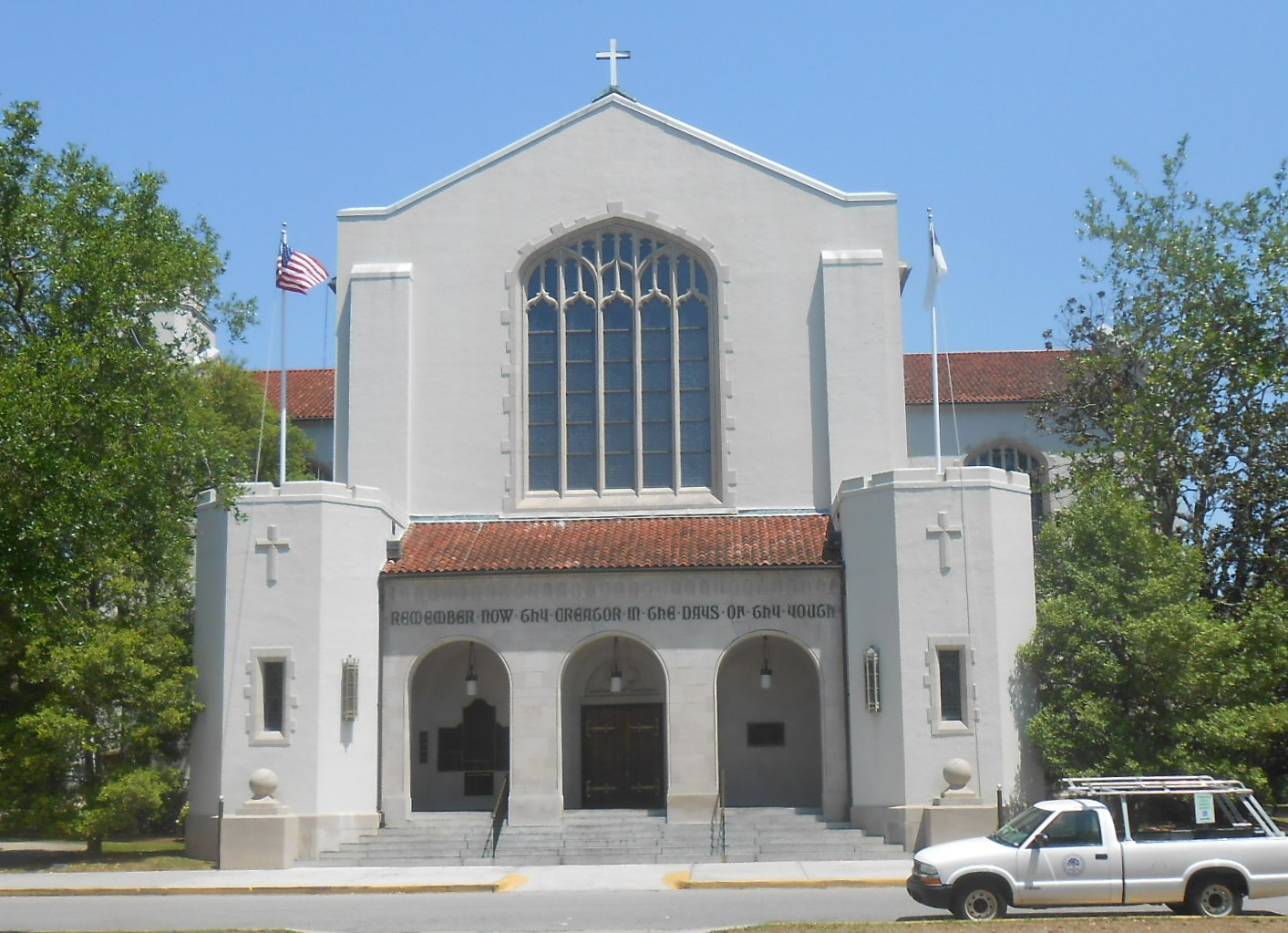
Summerall Chapel faces the Parade Grounds.

The Summerall Chapel, designed by C.R. MacDonald, was started on September 7, 1936, and dedicated on Palm Sunday, April 10, 1938. The first services, however, were held in the chapel on September 19, 1937. The chapel was named in honor of Citadel president General Charles Pelot Summerall. Inside, there is a set of 30 stained glass windows designed by H.G. Wilbert depicting the life of Jesus Christ which were executed by the Pittsburgh Stained Glass Studios in the 13th century Gothic style. A $1 million (equivalent to $2.99 million in 2025) repair program was developed for the chapel in 1985.

In June 2015, the school's Board of Visitors voted in favor of moving a Confederate naval jack from the chapel to what was called "an appropriate location on campus." As of September 2017, the flag had not yet been removed, nor had an "appropriate location" been selected.

=== The Daniel Library ===
Originally named "The Memorial Library and Museum" and opened in 1960, it was renamed in 1972, "The Daniel Library" in honor of Charles E. Daniel, '18 and Robert Hugh Daniel, '29, both lifelong benefactors of the college. Major renovations were completed in the fall of 2010. It houses over 200,000 volumes of material as well as electronic access to thousands of journals. The third floor of the building houses the campus archives and museum.

The Prioleau Room on the first floor houses special collections and is considered by many as one of the best places on campus to study with its dark wood panelling and fireplace. The Daniel Library website has information for locating items in the catalog, the Lowcountry Digital Library, and the Citadel's own Digital Collections.

=== Campus landmarks ===
==== HMS Seraph Monument ====
Located next to Mark Clark Hall at the northeast corner of Summerall Field, this uniquely shaped monument contains artifacts from the British submarine HMS Seraph, which carried then Major General Mark Clark to a secret landing in Algeria before the Allied landings in the North African Campaign of World War II to negotiate a surrender of the Vichy French forces; the vessel was also involved in Operation Mincemeat, a covert operation which succeeded in convincing the Germans that the allies intended to invade Sardinia, not Sicily. The memorial honors Anglo-American friendship and cooperation during World War II and is the only shore location in the United States authorized by the UK Ministry of Defence to fly the Royal Navy Ensign.

==== Howie Bell Tower and Carillon ====
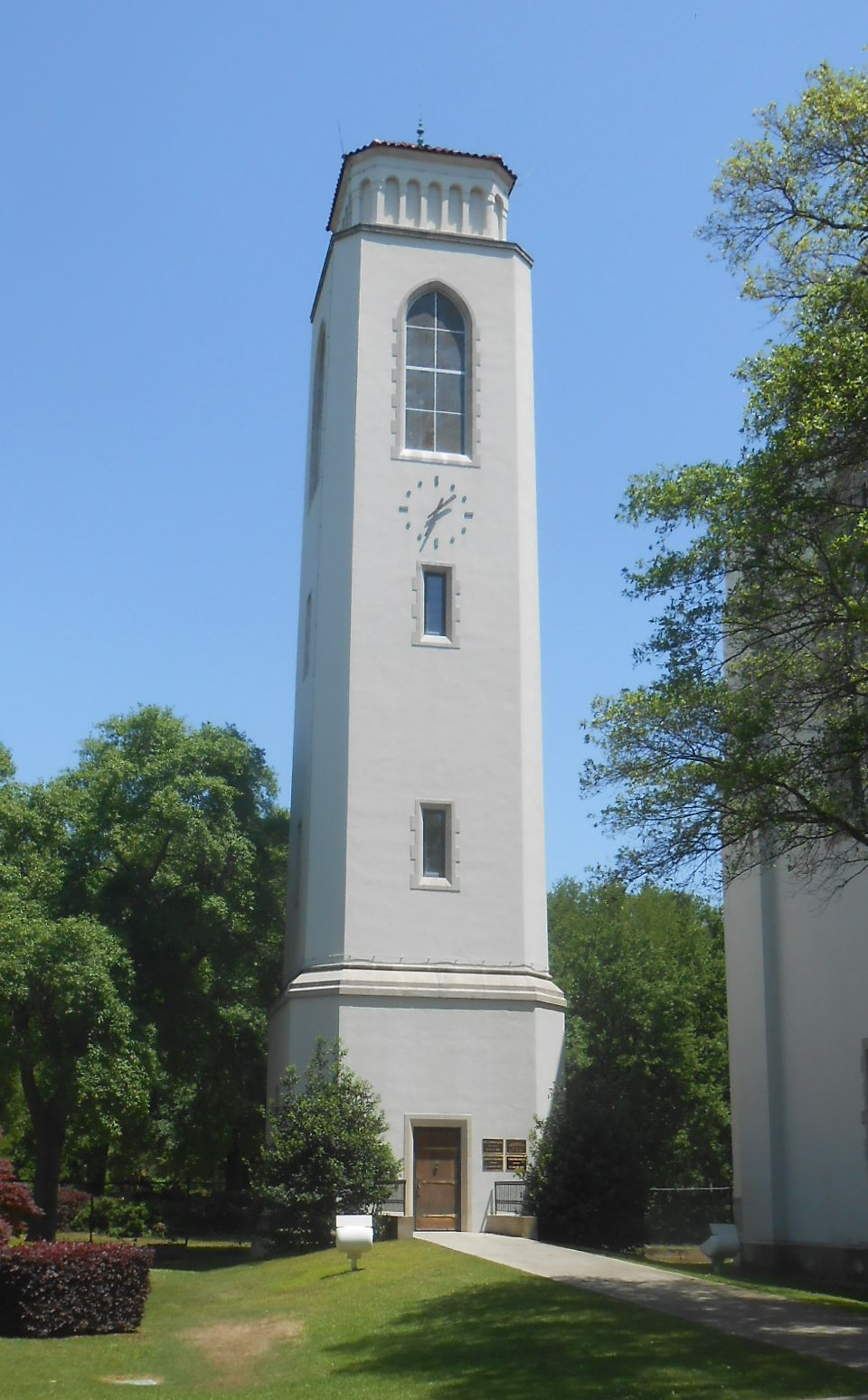
The Howie Carillon

Standing next to Summerall Chapel and built-in 1954, this structure honors one of the school's most revered alumni, US Army Major Thomas D. Howie, Class of 1929, who served as Commander of 3rd Battalion, 116th Infantry Regiment, 29th Infantry Division in the Normandy Campaign during World War II and was immortalized as "The Major of St Lo". Killed in action during the liberation of St. Lo, France, he was so respected that his flag-draped body was carried on the hood of a Jeep at the head of the column of troops so he could be accorded the honor of being the first American to enter the city. A photo of his body placed in the rubble of the St. Croix Cathedral came to symbolize the courage and sacrifice of US forces in the European Theater. The tower carillon is one of the largest in the Western Hemisphere, containing 59 bronze bells cast at the Royal Bergen Foundry in the Netherlands.

==== The Citadel War Memorial ====
Located in front of both the Howie Bell Tower and General Mark Clark's grave is the Citadel War Memorial. Dedicated in 2017 and built in a circular shape with walls of black granite and gates of wrought iron, the memorial features the 759 names of Citadel Alumni killed in all US wars, from the Mexican-American War to modern conflicts.

==== General Mark Clark Gravesite ====
Lying between Mark Clark Hall and Summerall Chapel is the burial plot of US Army General Mark Wayne Clark who served as Citadel President from 1954 to 1965 and President Emeritus until he died in 1984. The youngest Lieutenant General in the United States Army during World War II (age 46), Clark served as General Dwight Eisenhower's deputy during the "Operation Torch" landings in North Africa, then commanded the 5th Army in the Italian campaign liberating Rome in June 1944. He later served as Commanding General of the 15th Army Group and in 1952 was appointed by President Truman as Supreme Commander of UN forces in Korea.

==== The Citadel Ring Statue ====
Located at the southeast corner of the parade ground near Lesesne Gate, the main entrance to campus is a giant replica of the Citadel ring, recognized as the most important and treasured symbol of a graduate. It was a gift to the Citadel Alumni Association from Palmetto Balfour, the current supplier of the official Citadel class rings.

==== Monuments to the armed forces ====
On the parade ground are monuments dedicated to each of the military services and honoring the contributions of Citadel alumni to the military. They include a Marine landing craft (LVT-H-6); an Army Sherman Tank (M4A3); an Air Force fighter jet (F-4C Phantom II); an AH-1 "Cobra" helicopter gunship and an anchor from the aircraft carrier USS Coral Sea. A United States Coast Guard Bell serves as a monument to Citadel graduates who have lost their lives upon the sea.

== Alumni ==
The Citadel has produced distinguished alumni in a variety of career fields. Well known graduates include former U.S. Ambassador to Brazil Langhorne A. Motley, longtime U.S. Senator Ernest "Fritz" Hollings, best-selling authors Pat Conroy and Robert Jordan, football commentator Paul Maguire, NFL player and coach Stump Mitchell, Space Shuttle astronaut and International Space Station Commander Colonel Randy Bresnik, Carolina Panthers wide receiver Andre Roberts and the Commander of U.S. Central Command General Kenneth F. McKenzie Jr. Notable alumni include 6 governors, 3 U.S. senators, 12 congressmen, the presidents of 47 colleges and universities, the Director of the U.S. Olympic Committee and many professional athletes.

Approximately 35% of cadet graduates are commissioned as officers into the military, another 10% go directly to graduate programs; alumni currently serve in all six military services. Over the years, 299 Citadel alumni have reached the top ranks in the military by becoming flag officers (Generals, Admirals or Commodore), ten have served as a state Adjutant General. Nine alumni have served as pilots with the two U.S. military flight demonstration units, the Thunderbirds and Blue Angels; graduates have served as commanders of both squadrons. Alumni also serve in the military services of foreign countries including six 4 Star Generals from Thailand and the head of Jordan's Security Forces.

Citadel alumni were killed in action during the Mexican–American War (6), Civil War (67), World War I (15), World War II (280), Korean War (32), Vietnam War (68), Lebanon (1), Grenada (1), the Gulf War (1), and the conflicts in Iraq and Afghanistan (22).

== In popular culture ==
- A thinly veiled depiction of the Citadel provides the background for Calder Willingham's novel End as a Man (1947) and the film adaptation, The Strange One (1957).
- Pat Conroy's 1980 novel The Lords of Discipline was based on Conroy's experience as a cadet at the Citadel during the 1960s and on his research of other military schools. The novel outraged many of his fellow graduates of the Citadel, who felt that the book was a thinly veiled portrayal of campus life that was highly unflattering. The rift was not healed until 2000, when Conroy was awarded an honorary degree and asked to deliver the commencement address the following year. That year Conroy spearheaded fundraising to renovate the banquet hall in the Citadel Alumni Association building. The Lords of Discipline was made into a movie of the same name starring David Keith and Robert Prosky in 1983. Conroy also wrote about his experiences at the Citadel in his memoir My Losing Season (2002).
- The main character in the Netflix adaptation of House of Cards famously attended, and later has a library named after him at "The Sentinel", a military academy in South Carolina clearly modeled on the Citadel.
