= Roger C. Poole =

United States Army general and academic

- Born: Roger Clifton Poole; December 31, 1936 (age 89); Fayetteville, North Carolina
- Military career
- Allegiance: United States of America
- Branch: South Carolina Unorganized Militia
- Rank: Major General
- Other work: President of The Citadel

Roger "Cliff" Clifton Poole (born December 31, 1936) served twice as interim president of The Citadel. His first term was in 1996–1997, his second in 2005–2006. Poole is brevet Major General in the Unorganized Militia of South Carolina (UMSC).

Poole was born in Fayetteville, NC. He received his B.A. from The Citadel in 1959, then continued his education at the University of South Carolina, receiving his M.B.A. (1962) and Ph.D. (1974) at that school. Poole also did post-doctoral study in international finance at the London School of Economics.

Poole joined the E. Claiborne Robins School of Business at the University of Richmond, Virginia in 1975 as assistant professor, and later became a full professor and served as interim dean and associate dean of the graduate business school on two occasions. Poole has twice earned the Distinguished Educator Award from the University of Richmond.

He joined The Citadel as vice president for academic affairs and dean of the college in July 1993, and served as the interim president for the academic year 1996–1997. He teaches business finance in the Baker School of Business.

== Honors ==
- Board Of Visitors Air University - appointed for nine-year term by Secretary of Defense
- Alumnus of the Year - The Citadel (1999)
- Palmetto Medal Award - Distinguished Service - awarded by the Board of Visitors, The Citadel (1998)
- Officer's Cross of the Sovereign Order of St. Stanislaus
- Beta Gamma Sigma National Honor Society in Business
- Omicron Delta Epsilon National Honor Society in Economics
- Omicron Delta Kappa National Leadership Society
- Kappa Delta Pi International Honor Society in Education
- Phi Kappa Phi Academic Honor Society
- Legion of Merit Award
- Meritorious Service Medal with Oak Leaf Cluster
- Army Commendation Medal with Oak Leaf Cluster
- Army Reserve Components Achievement Medal with Two Oak Leaf Clusters
- National Defense Service Medal (with star)
