= Glenn M. Walters =

United States Marine Corps general

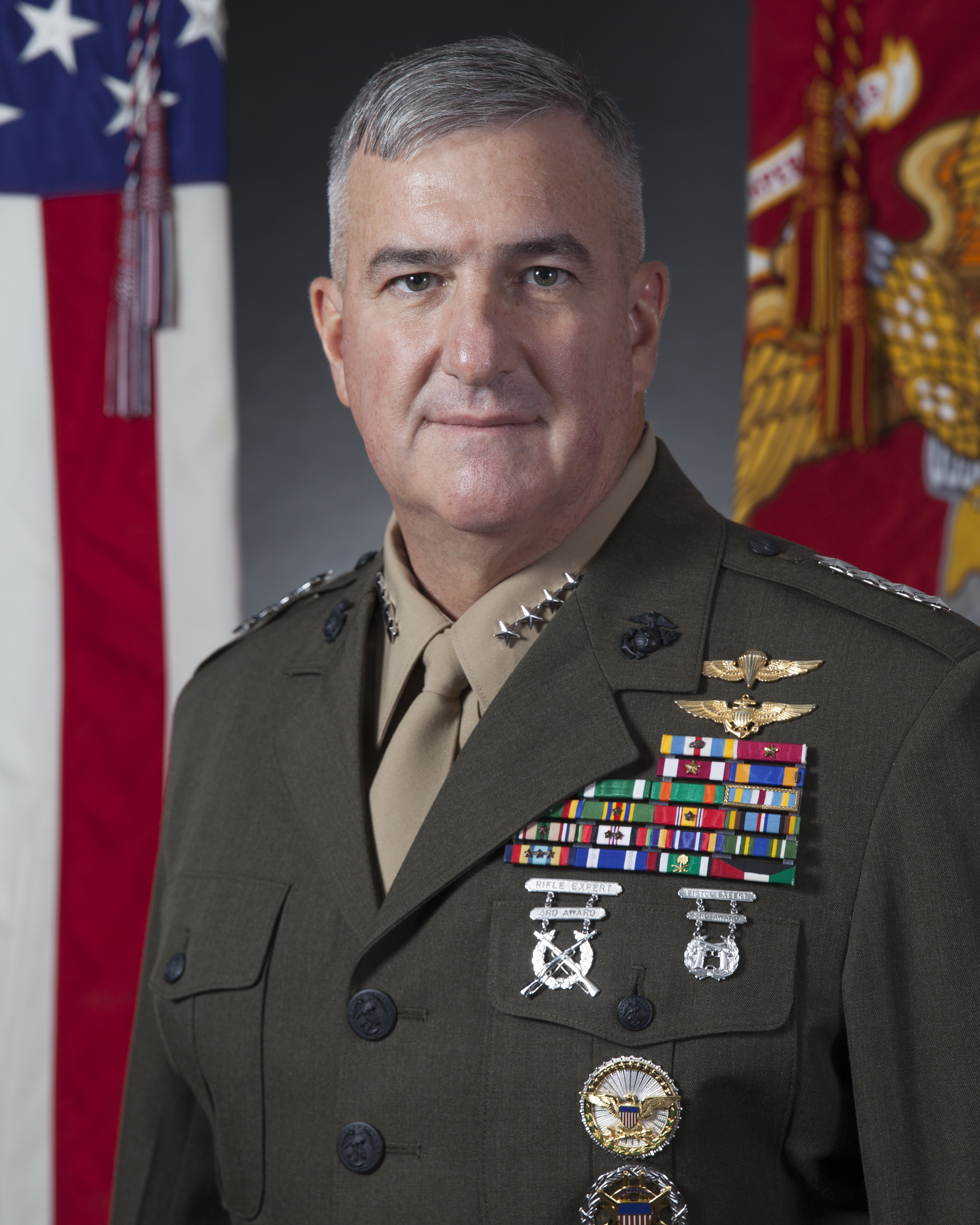
- Born: July 3, 1957 (age 69); Warrenton, Virginia, U.S.
- Education: The Citadel
- Military career
- Allegiance: United States
- Branch: United States Marine Corps
- Service years: 1979–2018
- Rank: General
- Commands: 2nd Marine Aircraft Wing; VMX-22; HMLAT-303
- Conflicts: Gulf War; War in Afghanistan
- Awards: Navy Distinguished Service Medal (2); Defense Superior Service Medal (2); Legion of Merit (2)

Glenn Michael Walters (born July 3, 1957) is a retired United States Marine Corps General, who served as the 34th Assistant Commandant of the Marine Corps from 2016 to 2018. He was appointed as the 20th President of his alma mater, The Citadel, on April 12, 2018.

== Early life and education ==
Glenn Michael Walters was born in Warrenton, Virginia on July 3, 1957. He was commissioned as a Second Lieutenant on May 12, 1979, following his graduation from The Citadel. He is a retired United States Marine Corps General, serving as the 34th Assistant Commandant of the Marine Corps from 2016 to 2018. He assumed duties as the 20th President of his alma mater, The Citadel, on October 5, 2018.

== Military career ==
Upon completion of the Officers Basic Course in November 1979, Walters was assigned to 3rd Battalion, 2nd Marines at Marine Corps Base Camp Lejeune, North Carolina as a Platoon Commander in Weapons Company. He attended flight training at Naval Air Station Pensacola, Florida, and was designated a Naval Aviator in March 1981.

After receiving his wings, Walters was assigned to Marine Aircraft Group 39 (MAG-39) for training in the AH-1T Super Cobra, subsequently transferring to HMA-169 as the Flight Line Officer, Flight Scheduler and Adjutant. He completed two WESTPAC cruises in 1983 and 1984 with HMM-265 (Reinforced).

In June 1986, Walters was assigned to 1st Reconnaissance Battalion, 1st Marine Division, at Marine Corps Base Camp Pendleton, California, for duty as Air Officer and Operations Officer. In July 1987 he was reassigned to HMT-303 for refresher training in the AH-1T and subsequent transition to the AH-1W. In July 1987 he was deployed on MAGTF 1–88 in support of Operation Ernest Will in the Persian Gulf on the USS Okinawa (LPH-3). After returning to the United States he was assigned as the Assistant Operations Officer and S-4 in HMLA-169.

Departing MAG-39 in September 1989, Walters attended Multi-Engine Transition Training at Naval Air Station Corpus Christi, Texas. He then attended the United States Naval Test Pilot School in 1990. After graduation from Test Pilot School, Walters was assigned to the Attack/Assault Department of the Rotary Wing Aircraft Test Directorate at Naval Air Station Patuxent River, Maryland. His duties included Flight Test lead for the AH-1W Night Targeting System, Integrated Body and Head Restraint System and AH-1W Maverick Missile feasibility testing. He was elected to the Society of Experimental Test Pilots in October 1994.

In April 1994, after his tour in Flight Test, Walters was assigned duties in the Fleet Introduction Team for the AH-1W Night Targeting System at MAG-39 at Marine Corps Air Station Camp Pendleton, California. Upon completion of Fleet Introduction of the NTS system, Walters assumed the duties as Operation Officer for HMLA-369, deploying to Okinawa in November 1995. Returning from Okinawa in May 1996, Major Walters assumed the duties as executive officer of HMLA-369.

Walters took command of Marine Light Attack Squadron 303 on 4 June 1997 and relinquished command 21 months later on 2 March 1999. He was subsequently assigned the duties as Executive Officer, MAG-39. During April 1999, Walters was transferred to the Aviation Branch, Headquarters Marine Corps, for service as the Head, APP-2 in the Aviation Plans and Programs Division. In March 2001, he was transferred to the Office of the Under Secretary of Defense, Acquisition, Technology & Logistics, Defense System, Land Warfare, where he was an Aviation Staff Specialist.

Walters assumed command of VMX-22 on 28 August 2003, becoming the first commanding officer of the initial squadron to field the V-22 tiltrotor aircraft. In August 2006, Walters was assigned as head of the Aviation Requirements Branch (APW) in the Department of Aviation at HQMC. From January 2007 to April 2008, he served as head of the Plans, Policy and Budget Branch (APP). In March 2008, he assumed the duties of Assistant Deputy Commandant for Aviation. After his promotion to brigadier general in August 2008, he was assigned to the Joint Staff as Deputy Director J-8, DDRA. Walters came to 2nd Marine Aircraft Wing in July 2010, and assumed command of 2d Marine Aircraft Wing (Forward) in Afghanistan in support Operation Enduring Freedom in November 2010. He was promoted to major general while deployed in August 2011. Elevated to lieutenant general in June 2013, he assumed the position of Assistant Commandant for Programs and Resources. On 2 August 2016 he received his fourth star and became the 34th Assistant Commandant of the Marine Corps.

On April 12, 2018, The Citadel announced that Walters was selected from a pool of four finalists to lead the college after the retirement of Lieutenant General John Rosa on June 30, 2018. Walters retired from active duty on October 4, 2018, and assumed his new duties at The Citadel the following day. In Fall 2025, The Citadel announced that Walters would be retiring in June 2026

== Awards and decorations ==
Walters' decorations and medals include:

Navy and Marine Corps Parachutist Insignia
Naval Aviator Badge
| Navy Distinguished Service Medal with one gold award star | Defense Superior Service Medal with one bronze oak leaf cluster | Legion of Merit with one award star | Meritorious Service Medal with one award star |
| Air Medal with bronze Strike/Flight numeral 1 | Navy Commendation Medal | Navy Achievement Medal | Joint Meritorious Unit Award |
| Navy Unit Commendation with one bronze service star | Navy Meritorious Unit Commendation with service star | National Defense Service Medal with one service star | Armed Forces Expeditionary Medal |
| Southwest Asia Service Medal with service star | Afghanistan Campaign Medal with two service stars | Global War on Terrorism Service Medal | Korea Defense Service Medal |
| Sea Service Deployment Ribbon with three service stars | NATO Medal for service with ISAF | Kuwait Liberation Medal (Saudi Arabia) | Kuwait Liberation Medal (Kuwait) |
| Rifle Expert Badge (3rd award) | | Pistol Expert Badge (3rd award) | |
Office of the Secretary of Defense Identification Badge
Office of the Joint Chiefs of Staff Identification Badge

Military offices
| Preceded by John M. Paxton Jr. | Assistant Commandant of the Marine Corps; 2016–2018 | Succeeded by Gary L. Thomas |
