= Oliver James Bond =

American educator and college administrator

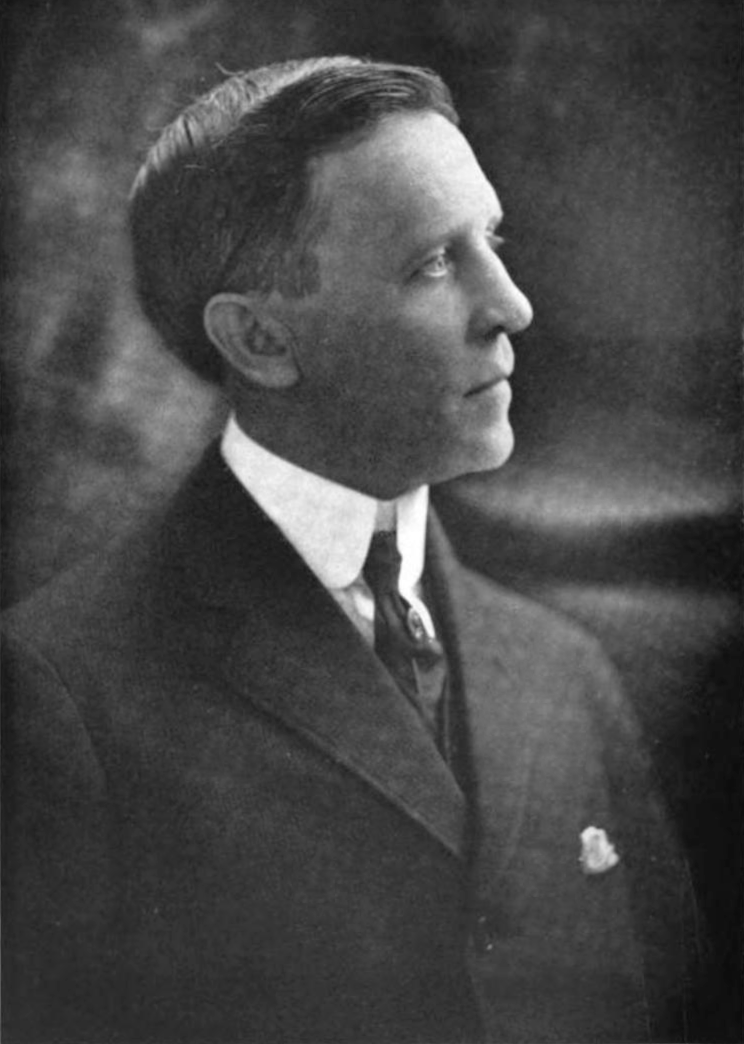

9th President of The Citadel
- In office 1908–1931
- Preceded by: Colonel Asbury Coward
- Succeeded by: General Charles Pelot Summerall

Personal details
- Born: May 11, 1865 Marion, South Carolina, US
- Died: October 1, 1933 (aged 68) Charleston, South Carolina, US
- Education: South Carolina Military Academy
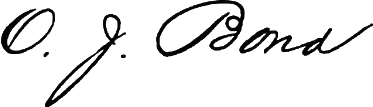
- Signature

Colonel Oliver James Bond, South Carolina Militia (May 11, 1865 – October 1, 1933) was an American educator and college administrator who served as both Superintendent and President of The Citadel from 1908 to 1931.

== Biography ==
Born in Marion, South Carolina, he entered the South Carolina Military Academy at Charleston in 1882 with the first group of cadets to enroll after the school reopened following its occupation by Union troops at the end of the American Civil War; after graduating in 1886 he was appointed an assistant professor of Mathematics and later served as Professor of Mechanical Drawing and Astronomy. He was elevated to Superintendent in 1908, in 1910 the name of the school was changed to The Citadel, The Military College of South Carolina and in 1921 the Superintendent title was changed to president; Bond was the last Superintendent and first President of the school. Also during his tenure enrollment more than doubled and in 1922 the school moved from its original location on Marion Square in downtown Charleston to "The Greater Citadel", a new 300-acre campus located between the Ashley River and Hampton Park on the northwest side of the city.

After retiring as president he was appointed Academic Dean; during this time he wrote the first detailed history of the school entitled The Story of The Citadel. Bond Hall, the administration building on The Citadel campus is named in his honor. Junior cadets trying out for The Summerall Guards elite drill platoon are known as "Bond Volunteers".

Bond married Mary Fishburne Roach of Bamberg, South Carolina in 1889; they had a son. He died from a heart attack at his home at The Citadel on October 1, 1933, and is interred at Magnolia Cemetery in Charleston.
