= John Peyre Thomas Sr. =

American educator, politician and historian

Colonel John P. Thomas Sr. South Carolina Militia
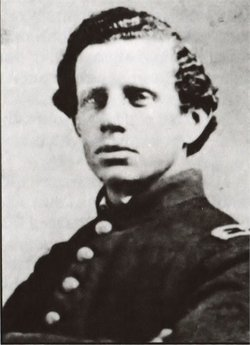

6th Superintendent, South Carolina Military Academy (The Citadel)
- In office 1882–1885
- Preceded by: Major James B. White
- Succeeded by: BGen George Doherty Johnston

Personal details
- Born: John Peyre Thomas; March 17, 1833 Berkeley County, South Carolina, U.S.
- Died: February 11, 1912 (age 78) Columbia, South Carolina, U.S.
- Education: South Carolina Military Academy
- Profession: Educator; State legislator Historian and author

Colonel John Peyre Thomas Sr. (March 17, 1833 – February 11, 1912) was an educator, politician and historian who served as 6th Superintendent of the South Carolina Military Academy (now The Citadel).

== Career ==
A native of Berkeley County, South Carolina, he was a First Honor graduate of the Class of 1851 at the Citadel Academy in Charleston and upon graduation became a professor of English and History at the Arsenal Academy in Columbia, the second of the two schools that made up the SCMA. In 1861, he became Superintendent of The Arsenal and also served as Commander of Company B of the Battalion of State Cadets, the military unit that comprised all of the cadets of the SCMA, who fought in eight engagements during the American Civil War. Thomas was in command of the Arsenal cadet company when the entire 343 man Corps of Cadets from the SCMA joined a Confederate States Army force of 550 at the Battle of Tulifinny in December 1864; they successfully defended a section of the Savannah to Charleston rail line against a Union force of 5,000, allowing more than 100,000 Confederate troops to escape the advancing army of General William T. Sherman. This battle is the only time the entire student body of a United States college fought in combat. Thomas led Arsenal cadets when they fired what may have been the last shots of the Civil War east of the Mississippi in a skirmish with Union troops at Williamston, South Carolina, on May 1, 1865; the Battalion of State Cadets was the last armed Confederate force in South Carolina when it was disbanded by Thomas at Newberry, South Carolina, on May 9.

With the SCMA closed and occupied by Federal troops at the end of the conflict, Thomas studied law and was admitted to the bar in 1871; in 1873, he established the Carolina Military Institute in Charlotte, North Carolina, and served as superintendent for nine years. In 1882 by act of the South Carolina legislature the SCMA was reopened with a single campus at the site of the former Citadel Academy on Marion Square in Charleston, with Thomas as superintendent; he resigned in 1885 but continued as a member of the Board of Visitors. From 1886 to 1887, Thomas served in the South Carolina State Legislature, then was appointed State Historian. He authored numerous books, among them being The History of the South Carolina Military Academy published in 1893, which covered the first 50 years of the school's existence.

== Personal life ==
Thomas was married to Mary Caroline Gibbes; the couple had 14 children. Son Albert Sidney Thomas later served as Episcopal bishop of South Carolina, and son John Peyre Thomas Jr. (1857–1946) was dean of the law school at the University of South Carolina. Colonel Thomas died in Columbia, South Carolina, at the age of 78 and is buried in the cemetery of Trinity Episcopal Church.
