= John S. Grinalds =

American general

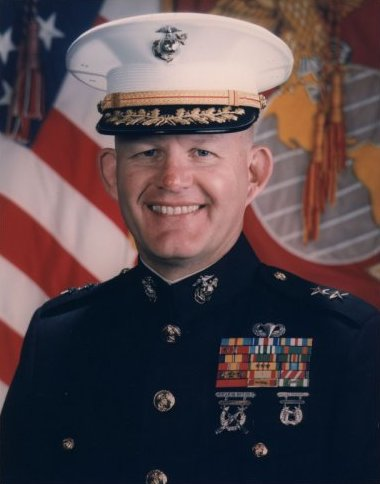
- Born: John Southy Grinalds; January 5, 1938; Baltimore, Maryland
- Military career
- Allegiance: United States of America
- Branch: United States Marine Corps
- Service years: 1959 – 1991
- Rank: Major general
- Commands: Marine Corps Recruit Depot San Diego; 9th Marine Regiment; 3d Battalion, 8th Marines
- Conflicts: Vietnam War
- Awards: Silver Star
- Other work: President of The Citadel

John Southy Grinalds is a retired United States Marine Corps major general who served as the 18th president of The Citadel.

== Education ==
Grinalds was born on January 5, 1938, in Baltimore, Maryland, but spent most of his childhood in Macon, Georgia. By the time he graduated from high school, Grinalds had become a class officer, an all-state football player, an honor student, and a colonel of the Junior ROTC unit.

Grinalds received a bachelor's degree with honors from the United States Military Academy in 1959. Grinalds was the first West Point graduate since 1814 to be commissioned directly into the United States Marine Corps. He continued his education at Brasenose College, Oxford University as a Rhodes Scholar, earning bachelor's and master's degrees in geography and, once again, graduating with honors. He served as a White House Fellow in 1971 and completed his MBA at Harvard Business School with distinction in 1974.

== Military career ==
Serving with the Department of Defense Systems Analysis Office during the late 1960s, Grinalds became a workforce planning analyst—a field in which he developed an expertise used throughout his military service. Grinalds has served abroad in the Mediterranean region, the Panama Canal Zone, Japan, Belgium, and for two tours of duty in Vietnam. During one of those tours, he was awarded a Silver Star for heroism in combat. In 1978, he was promoted to lieutenant colonel and became a battalion commander in the Second Marine Division. Oliver North, who was then a major, served as his operations officer.

From 1982 to 1985, he served as special assistant to the Supreme Allied Commander, Europe, working in delicate negotiations between NATO and the French military. Because of his outstanding service there, French President François Mitterrand inducted him into the Légion d'honneur, a rare honor for an American colonel.

In 1986, Grinalds received the rank of brigadier general before beginning an assignment serving the Chairman of the Joint Chiefs of Staff. He was later promoted to major general and, in 1989, became the commanding general of the Marine Corps Recruit Depot in San Diego, California, a position he held until his retirement in 1991.

== Education career ==
Grinalds then entered the field of education, becoming the seventh headmaster of Woodberry Forest School, a boys' preparatory school. He served there until coming to The Citadel in 1997.

Grinalds has also served on the Senior Board of Directors of the Brasenose College Charitable Foundation and the Executive Board of the Coastal Carolina Council, Boy Scouts of America. He has been a trustee of Porter-Gaud School in Charleston, Hampden-Sydney College and the Madeira School, both in Virginia. He has served on the Virginia and South Carolina state selection committees for the Rhodes Scholarship Trust.

He currently heads The Grinalds Group, providing advice and consulting services to educational institutions.

=== The Citadel ===
He became president of The Citadel on August 1, 1997, one year after the first female cadets were admitted. During his first year, Grinalds announced his intentions to strengthen the college's communications, admissions, and fundraising functions while also focusing on cadet leadership training and the philosophy that leadership means service to others.

Significant milestones in admissions, fundraising, education, and media relations marked his tenure as president. However, a less tangible but more far-reaching influence was his advocacy of principled leadership, as evidenced by his strong support for integrating leadership and ethics into all aspects of campus life.

Interest in The Citadel increased significantly under Grinalds' leadership, and in the later years of his tenure, the college set admissions records. As applications increased, entering classes were more competitive, and retention improved. Female enrollment in the Corps of Cadets grew from four to more than 120 in eight years. The separate fundraising entities of the college are now coordinated under a unified organization – The Citadel Foundation – and donations to the college grew dramatically.

Under Grinald's administration, the college received media coverage for its institunional outcomes. Measures of cadet life, including academic performance, community service, employment upon graduation, remained stable during his leadership.

== Awards ==
Grinalds is active in several organizations. He is a member of the Officers' Christian Fellowship, the White House Fellows Association, and the Association of American Rhodes Scholars. He is also a member of the Sons of the American Revolution, the Kappa Alpha Order, and an honorary member of the Society of the Cincinnati.

In 2004, the South Carolina Chamber of Commerce honored Grinalds with the Sgt. William Jasper Freedom Award, an annual award given to a South Carolinian who has made significant contributions to preserving freedom, upholds the highest standards of ethics, and has a reputation for excellence that earns the respect of South Carolina citizens. The Rotary Club of Charleston, which he has served as a past president, has named him a Paul Harris Fellow.

== Family ==
Grinalds married Norwood Dennis, his childhood sweetheart from Macon, in 1962. They have four children.
