= Lowcountry Graduate Center =

Educational consortium based in North Charleston, South Carolina, USA

- Type: Public Consortium
- Established: 2001
- Location: 2001 Mabeline Rd., North Charleston, South Carolina, 29406, U.S. 32°55′47.064″N 80°1′54.12″W
- Website: www.LowcountryGradCenter.org

The Lowcountry Graduate Center (LGC) is a public higher education consortium located in North Charleston, South Carolina and established in 2001 to expand opportunities in graduate-level education to the Charleston, SC region.

== History ==
In the late 1990s, local business and legislative leaders were concerned that the region was losing high-tech companies because of the limitations in graduate education available in the area. They believed that Charleston should be a perfect setting for economic growth in the new economy – with the nation's fourth largest seaport, a center of Homeland Security activity, and a region of ecological and historical richness. Yet, the idealized concept was hampered, at the time, by the lack of graduate opportunities needed to attract and retain employees and new businesses.

Established in 2001, the LGC brings together the power of local, Lowcountry public universities – the College of Charleston, the Medical University of South Carolina and The Citadel to help provide accessible graduate-level programs and courses. With these institutions, plus the University of South Carolina and South Carolina State University, the LGC formed new partnerships and ways to bring graduate-level education to the area. The LGC consistently focuses on the economic development needs of the Charleston Metro Area, keeping in contact with local Chambers of Commerce and organizations associated with three focus sectors: 1) advanced manufacturing and IT; 2) healthcare and community wellness; and 3) K-12 education.

The LGC has previously partnered with Clemson University and Anderson University.

In August 2020 the LGC moved from the College of Charleston North Campus previously located on Paramount Dr. in North Charleston, SC, which previously housed CofC's School of Professional Studies, to Trident Technical College.
