= George Doherty Johnston =

Confederate States Army general

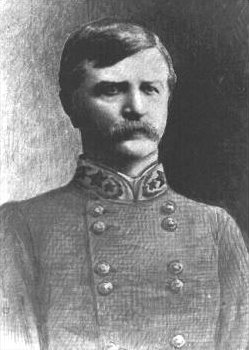
- Born: May 30, 1832; Hillsborough, North Carolina, U.S.
- Died: December 8, 1910 (aged 78); Tuscaloosa, Alabama, U.S.
- Burial place: Greenwood Cemetery Tuscaloosa, Alabama
- Military career
- Allegiance: Confederate States of America
- Branch: Confederate States Army
- Service years: 1861–65
- Rank: Brigadier General
- Commands: 25th Alabama Infantry Regiment
- Conflicts: American Civil War
- Other work: Politician; Educator

George Doherty Johnston (May 30, 1832 – December 8, 1910) was a Confederate general during the American Civil War and was the 7th superintendent of The Citadel (then called the South Carolina Military Academy) from 1885 to 1890.

== Early life ==
George Doherty Johnston was born in Hillsborough, North Carolina. In 1834, his father moved the family to Greensboro, Alabama, where he died less than a year later. His mother then moved the family to Marion, Alabama. Johnston received his education from private tutors before attending Howard College.

He then studied law at Cumberland School of Law at Cumberland University in Lebanon, Tennessee. After graduation, he returned home and began his practice in Marion. Johnson was elected mayor of Marion in 1856 and to the state legislature in 1857.

== Civil War ==
Johnston joined the Confederate Army as second lieutenant of Company G of the 4th Alabama Infantry Regiment. Johnston fought with this unit at the First Battle of Bull Run. In January 1862, Johnston was commissioned major of the 25th Alabama Infantry Regiment. In September 1863 he was promoted to colonel of the same regiment.

Johnston was wounded in the leg at the Battle of Ezra Church two days after promotion to brigadier general. He was on crutches during the Franklin-Nashville Campaign and he took command of Brigadier General William Andrew Quarles' Brigade following the Battle of Franklin. Johnston took part in every battle of the Army of Tennessee from the Battle of Shiloh to the Battle of Bentonville.

== Post-war career ==
Johnston served as commandant of cadets at The University of Alabama following the War. He then moved to South Carolina to serve as superintendent of the South Carolina Military Academy (now The Citadel). He was appointed by President Grover Cleveland to the position of United States Civil Service Commissioner. He was elected to the state senate after returning to live in Tuscaloosa, Alabama.

== Death ==
Johnston died in Tuscaloosa on December 8, 1910, and is buried at Greenwood Cemetery in Tuscaloosa.

== See also ==
- List of American Civil War generals (Confederate)
