= Asbury Coward =

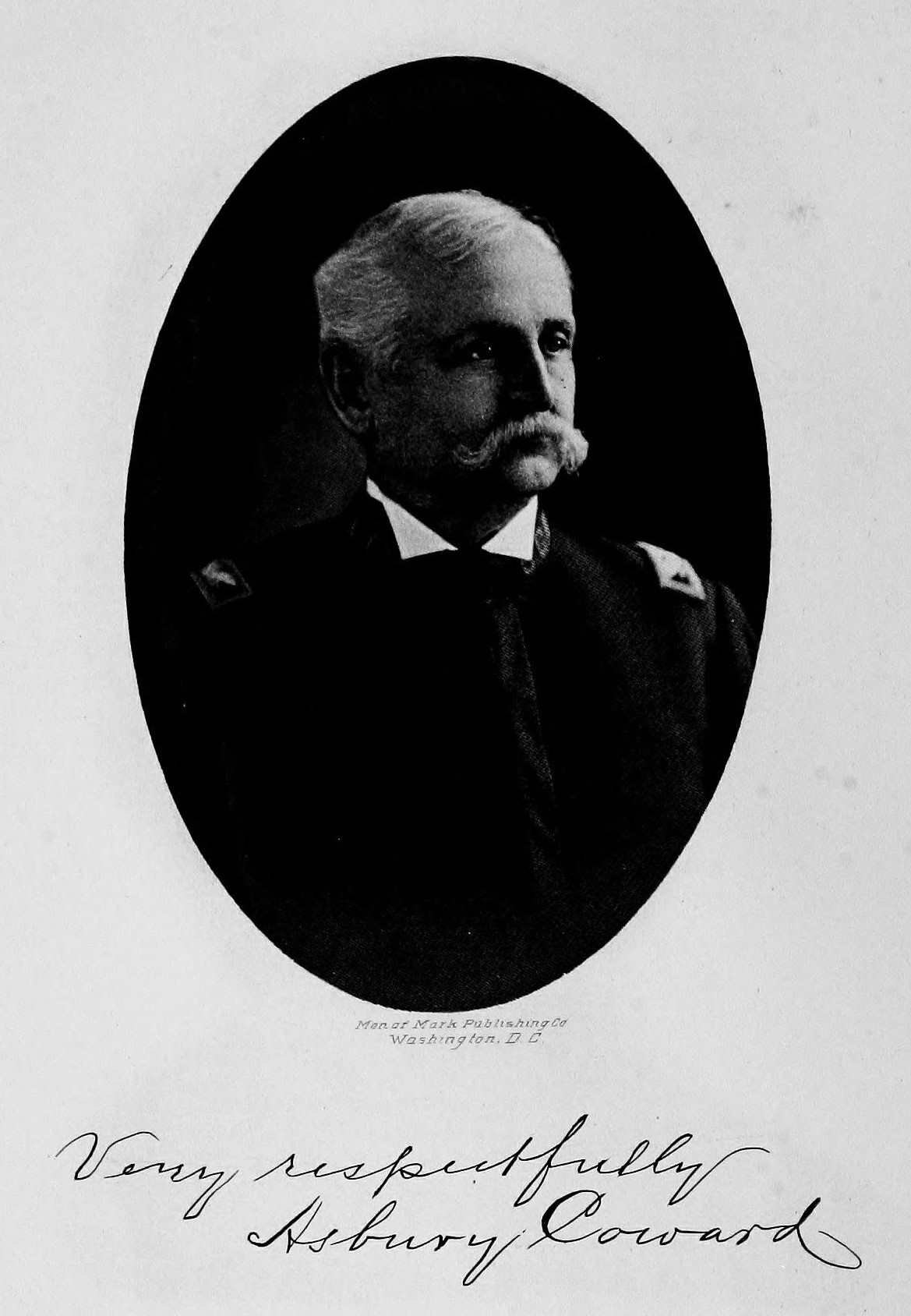
Col. Asbury Coward

Asbury Coward (September 19, 1835 – April 28, 1925) was a school leader, Confederate Army officer, and South Carolina Superintendent of Education. Coward was highly-regarded by General Robert E. Lee during his Confederate Army service in the American Civil War and later served as 8th Superintendent of The Citadel (then called the South Carolina Military Academy) from 1890 to 1908.

== Biography ==
He was born on the Quenby Plantation outside Charleston, South Carolina, and graduated from South Carolina Military Academy (now The Citadel) in 1854. He and classmate Micah Jenkins established the King's Mountain Military School in Yorkville in 1855. It closed at the start of the American Civil War. It reopened after the war but the boarding school struggled with the challenging times and closed.

During the Civil War, Coward was commissioned as a colonel and served under General James Longstreet in Tennessee and Georgia. He was also a member of the 5th South Carolina Cavalry Regiment and an assistant adjutant on Col. David Rumph Jones' staff. In one of his reports, Gen. Robert E. Lee described Coward as "one of the best Colonels in his army."

He served as president of the Kings Mountain, North Carolina, centennial committee. He also had ties to the Charleston St. Andrew's Society.

In 1890, Coward was named Superintendent of The Citadel. He remained in that office until 1908 and died in 1925. He is buried at Rosehill Cemetery in York County.

== Personal life ==
Throughout the years surrounding Coward’s early life and the operation of the Kings Mountain Military School, his household included Charlotte and her daughter Ellen, whose labor as laundresses, seamstresses, and domestic workers contributed materially to the stability of his private life.

Income generated from hiring out Charlotte and other enslaved people financed Coward’s education at the South Carolina Military Academy (now The Citadel) and supported his early professional pursuits.

Ellen, who appears without a surname in pre‑emancipation records, bore five children during her years in the Coward household. Archival records document the births of her first three children in 1857, 1860, and 1862, while two additional children, born in 1866 and 1874, are identified through family oral tradition and genealogical research. A 2024 scholarly article by Thomasina Yuille, published in *Carolina Currents: Studies in South Carolina Culture, Volume 1: New Directions*, presents DNA‑supported genealogical evidence identifying Asbury Coward as the biological father of Mary Ann Hargrove McFall (born 1860) and linking him to at least two of her siblings.

Known in some Reconstruction‑era records as Ellen Coward, she adopted the surname Hargrove by the time of the 1870 census, reflecting the naming choices made by many formerly enslaved people during emancipation.

Ellen remained connected to Coward’s domestic life until sometime after 1874, during a period of escalating racial and political violence in York County following the height of the Klan Wars.

Their grandchild later wrote in his diary—published decades afterward as a memoir—that he believed his grandmother left Yorkville because of Klan activity, noting that she had spoken to him about the atrocities that occurred during that period.

== Legacy ==
The Daughters of the American Revolution erected a monument honoring him at Kings Mountain National Military Park in Blacksburg. The Citadel has a collection of his letters. Winthrop University has a small collection of his letters. His memoir was published in 1968.

The Citadel's mess hall building since 1991, Coward Hall, is named after Colonel Coward.
