= James W. Duckett =

American military official (1911–1991)

- Born: July 8, 1911; Greenwood, South Carolina
- Died: January 21, 1991 (aged 79); Charleston, South Carolina
- Burial place: Magnolia Cemetery; Charleston, South Carolina
- Military career
- Allegiance: United States of America
- Branch: South Carolina Unorganized Militia; United States Army
- Rank: Major General (South Carolina Unorganized Militia); Colonel (United States Army Reserve)
- Conflicts: World War II
- Awards: Bronze Star Medal
- Other work: President of The Citadel

Major General James W. Duckett (July 8, 1911 – January 21, 1991) was an American military official. He served as the 14th President of The Citadel from 1970 to 1974, succeeding General Hugh P. Harris.

== Biography ==
Born in Greenwood, South Carolina on July 8, 1911, he was a 1932 Honor Graduate of The Citadel earning a bachelor's degree in chemistry, Duckett joined The Citadel Chemistry department in 1934 after receiving his Master of Science in chemistry from the University of Georgia and Ph.D. from the University of North Carolina. During World War II, Duckett served as a Chemical Corps commander and officer on active duty in the Army in the European theater of operations. During his tenure at The Citadel, Duckett served as Dean of Admissions, Administrative Dean, the first Citadel Vice President and from 1970 to 1974 the President of the Military College of South Carolina. He was the first President of The Citadel to hold an earned doctorate.

Duckett served as president during one of the most challenging times in the schools history dealing with anti-military sentiment from the Vietnam War, drug use and rebellious attitudes among cadets responding to the changing social attitudes of the day.

General Duckett died on January 21, 1991. Duckett Hall, which houses The Citadels Biology Department, is named in his honor.
