= United States senior military college =

Colleges in the United States that offer military ROTC programs

In the United States, a senior military college (SMC) is one of six colleges that offer military Reserve Officers' Training Corps (ROTC) programs under 10 U.S.C. § 2111a(f), though many other schools offer military Reserve Officers' Training Corps under other sections of the law. The six senior military colleges are:

- Norwich University, in Northfield, Vermont
- Texas A&M University, in College Station, Texas
- The Citadel, in Charleston, South Carolina
- University of North Georgia, in Dahlonega, Georgia
- Virginia Military Institute, in Lexington, Virginia
- Virginia Tech, in Blacksburg, Virginia

== Criteria ==
=== Army ROTC ===
Under Army regulations, an SMC must meet certain criteria:

- Bachelor's degrees must be granted.
- All physically fit undergraduate students must take courses in military training. Exceptions to this requirement include foreign nationals, prior-service personnel, females not participating in ROTC, and students who are granted exemptions by a Professor of Military Science.
- The school must establish a corps of cadets in which all cadets wear military uniforms when on campus. The corps of cadets involves a military environment in which the students live constantly, not just during the school day, and in which the students are subject to military discipline.
- The SMC must have as an objective the development of character through military training and the regulation of cadet conduct according to principles of military discipline (a cadet code of conduct).
- The SMC must maintain military standards similar to those of the federal service academies.

Federal law currently prohibits the Department of Defense from requiring a policy in SMCs that mandates female students' participation in the ROTC programs.

Cadets at an SMC are authorized to take the ROTC program all four years, but taking a commission upon graduation remains optional, unlike other colleges where ROTC cadets are required to sign a contract to take commission before entering their final two years.

Under both Army Regulation (AR) 145-1 and federal law, the ROTC programs at the senior military colleges are treated differently from those at other schools. Unlike ROTC programs elsewhere, the Department of Defense is prohibited from closing or reducing the ROTC programs at an SMC, even during time of war (full or total mobilization).

The Secretary of Defense and the Secretaries of the military departments may not take or authorize any action to terminate or reduce a unit of the Senior ROTC at a SMC unless the termination or reduction is specifically requested by the college and Army "[SMC] ROTC programs will continue at an accelerated rate as directed."

In contrast with other colleges and universities: "Under full or total mobilization, the Secretary of the Army may withdraw the ROTC detachments without giving prior notice to the academic institution. The establishment of new SROTC detachments will not be authorized after full mobilization has been declared." All Military Science IV cadets at the SMCs will be commissioned and directed to attend the proper Officers Basic Course (OBC). At other colleges, ROTC programs will be suspended and the cadet will immediately be available for reassignment.

Another distinction of the SMC system is that all cadets at the SMCs are guaranteed active duty commissions when they graduate:

The Secretary of the Army shall ensure that a graduate of a SMC who desires to serve as a commissioned officer on active duty upon graduation from the college, who is medically and physically qualified for active duty, and who is recommended for such duty by the Professor of Military Science at the college, shall be assigned to active duty.

=== Naval ROTC ===
The Naval Reserve Officers Training Corps (NROTC) program is a college-based, commissioned officer training program of the United States Navy and the United States Marine Corps. It covers full tuition, offers stipends, and requires a post-graduation active-duty service commitment minimum of 5 years on active duty for Navy options, and 4 years for Marine Corps and Navy Nurse options. Applicants generally need to be a U.S. citizen between 17 and 23 years old with strong standardized test scores.

=== Air Force ROTC ===
Air Force Reserve Officer Training Course requires all airmen to receive a bachelor's degree, pass the PT test and complete field training.

== Schools ==
=== Norwich University ===
The Military College of Vermont, the oldest senior military college and the "Birthplace of ROTC", Norwich University is a private university located in Northfield, Vermont. Founded in 1819 at Norwich, Vermont, as the American Literary, Scientific and Military Academy, it is the oldest of the non-federal Military Academies and currently the only private military college in the United States. It is home to both a corps of cadets and a traditional civilian student population.

=== University of North Georgia ===
The University of North Georgia (UNG), also known as The Military College of Georgia, is located in Dahlonega, Georgia. Since its creation in 1873 as North Georgia Agricultural College, the college required undergraduate resident males to participate in the Corps of Cadets (the corps was optional for resident undergraduate females and all commuting or graduate students). North Georgia was also the first SMC to admit women into the Corps of Cadets. The school has a large United States Army ROTC program and is the only senior military college without Navy/Marine Corps and Air Force programs. Students are no longer required to enroll in the military program.

=== Texas A&M University ===
Texas A&M University was established under the Morrill Act of 1862, and cadets began classes in 1876. During World War II, Texas A&M produced 20,229 students who served in combat. Of those, 14,123 served as officers: more than the combined total of the United States Naval Academy and the United States Military Academy.

Texas A&M has grown rapidly since the 20th century and is now one of the largest universities by enrollment in the United States, with an enrollment of 64,961 students, of which approximately 2,560 are cadets. In 2018, more than 220 cadets were commissioned as officers.

=== The Citadel ===
The Citadel, the Military College of South Carolina, is a state-supported, comprehensive college located in Charleston, South Carolina, which was established in 1842. The Citadel enrolls approximately 2,250 cadets in the South Carolina Corps of Cadets and another 2,000 civilian graduate and undergraduate students in The Citadel Graduate College. The Citadel also offers 8 online degree programs. In 2017, for the seventh consecutive year, U.S. News & World Report ranked The Citadel as the No. 1 regional public college in the South among those that offer master's degrees. Members of the Cadet Corps are required to be enrolled in ROTC and approximately one third are commissioned into the six military services. Active duty Marine and Navy personnel also attend cadet classes as part of the MECEP (Marine Enlisted Commissioning Education Program) and Seaman to Admiral (STA-21) programs which commission highly qualified NCOs; the MECEP program originated at The Citadel in 1973.

=== Virginia Military Institute ===
Founded in 1839 in Lexington, Virginia, the Virginia Military Institute is the oldest state military college in the United States. VMI has been called the "West Point of the South" because of its role during the Civil War and unlike any other senior military college in the United States, VMI enrolls military cadets only and awards bachelor degrees exclusively. Next to West Point, VMI has graduated more Army generals than any other college or university in the United States of America.

In addition to the accomplishments of its graduates in civilian endeavors, VMI is the only military college in the United States to graduate the highest ranking four-star generals across three services: Two Marine Corps Commandants, Lemuel C. Shepherd, Jr. and Randolph M. Pate, and Chiefs of Staff of the Army, George C. Marshall and the Air Force, John P. Jumper. VMI is also the only SMC in the United States to graduate a five-star general: General of the Army George C. Marshall. (Note: The following Americans have been promoted to five-star rank or above: • / General of the Armies John J Pershing / 3 September 1919; • / Fleet Admiral William D. Leahy / 15 December 1944; • / General of the Army George Marshall / 16 December 1944; • / Fleet Admiral Ernest King / 17 December 1944; • / General of the Army Douglas MacArthur / 18 December 1934; • / Fleet Admiral Chester W. Nimitz / 19 December 1944; • / General of the Army Dwight D. Eisenhower / 20 December 1944; • / General of the Army & Air Force Henry H. Arnold / 21 December 1944 & 7 May 1949; • / Fleet Admiral William Halsey, Jr. / 11 December 1945; • / General of the Army Omar Bradley / 20 September 1950; • / General of the Armies George Washington / 4 July 1976^{a}; The timing of the first seven appointments established both a clear order of seniority and a near-equivalence between the Army and Navy services. In 1949, Arnold was honored by being made the first, and to date only, General of the Air Force. He is the only American to serve in a five-star rank in two of its military services. Of these generals, only Marshall and Washington did not graduate from one of the service academies. Washington never graduated from college and Marshall graduated from VMI. By a Congressional Act of 24 March 1903, Admiral George Dewey's rank was established as Admiral of the Navy, a rank which was specified to be senior to the four-star rank of admiral and was equal to admiral of the fleet in the British Royal Navy. Admiral Dewey was the only individual ever appointed to this rank, which lapsed with his death on 16 January 1917.^aDuring the United States Bicentennial year, George Washington was posthumously appointed to the grade of General of the Armies of the United States by the congressional joint resolution Public Law 94-479 passed on 19 January 1976, with an effective appointment date of 4 July 1976. This restored Washington's position as the most senior U.S. military officer.)

=== Virginia Tech ===
Virginia Polytechnic Institute and State University (Virginia Tech), located in Blacksburg, Virginia, is one of only two major public universities to host a senior military college as part of a larger civilian university. The Corps of Cadets has existed since Virginia Tech's 1872 founding; membership was mandatory for all male students during their entire term at the school until 1924 when the requirement was reduced to two years. After World War II, prior-service students were not required to enter the Corps, and in 1964 Corps membership was made voluntary for all non-ROTC students. In 1973, Virginia Tech was the first military college to admit women into their Corps of Cadets, even before the service academies. Members of the Corps may participate in one of two tracks: the Military-Leader Track in one of the three nationally distinguished ROTC programs leading to an officer's commission or the Citizen-Leader Track to serve in the public or private sectors after graduation. On average, Virginia Tech has the highest commissioning numbers amongst its senior military college counterparts, regularly commissioning 80 percent or higher of its graduating class into the active duty military each year. The Citizen-Leader Track also sees 80 to 85 percent of its graduates receive job offers or graduate school admittance before commencement ceremonies each May.

== U.S. Coast Guard Direct Commission Selective Schools (DCSS) ==
Graduates of the six SMCs, as well as Mary Baldwin University, Massachusetts Maritime Academy, and Prairie View A&M University, are allowed to commission into the U.S. Coast Guard under the Direct Commission Selective School (DCSS) program.

The DCSS program is similar to, but should not be confused with the Coast Guard’s Direct Commission Maritime Graduate (MARGRAD) program for qualified graduates of the six State Maritime Academies or the USMMA.^{[ibid.]}

== America's Corps of Cadets ==
On September 30, 2026, Secretary of Defense Pete Hegseth announced that he would be restoring the title of Distinguished Military Colleges to create America's Corps of Cadets with Louisiana State University, Liberty University, Tuskegee University, Mississippi State University, and Hillsdale College set to participate in starting a new pathway for officer commissioning in the same manner as the existing SMCs.
