= Campus of The Citadel =

College campus in Charleston, South Carolina, US

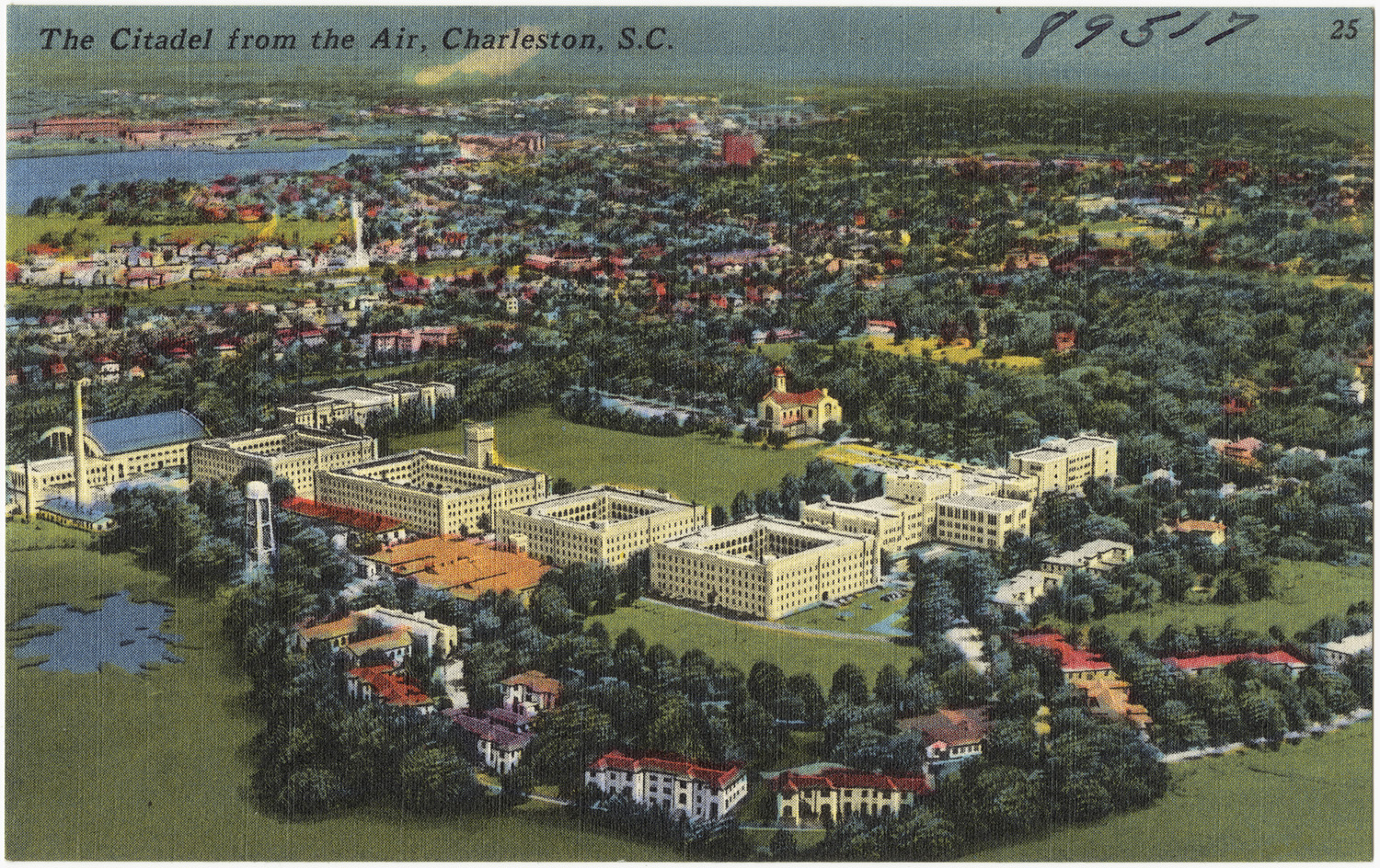
A postcard view of The Citadel from about 1942

The campus of the Citadel Military College of South Carolina consists of a 300-acre (120 ha) space adjacent to Hampton Park in Charleston, South Carolina. It has been home to the Citadel Military College of South Carolina since 1922 when the school moved from its location on Marion Square, including the Old Citadel. Arranged with the primary buildings surrounding a central 10-acre (4 ha) parade ground, it consists of barracks for the Corps of Cadets, academic buildings, a mess hall, chapel, library, athletic and recreational facilities, support buildings, and housing for faculty and staff.

The campus is built in a Spanish Moorish style.

The campus is bounded on the west by the Ashley River, to the north by the Wagener Terrace neighborhood, to the east by Hampton Park and the Hampton Park Terrace neighborhood, and to the South by the Westside Neighborhood.

Just off the main campus are the football stadium, baseball stadium, and alumni center. Additionally, the school owns and operates a large house facility located near the north end of the Isle of Palms.

== Academic buildings ==
Building	Image	Constructed	Notes	Reference
Capers Hall		1942 (rebuilt in 2023)	Home to the School of Humanities and Social Sciences and Zucker Family School of Education. Was replaced in 2023. Named for brothers Brigadier General Ellison Capers and Major Francis W. Capers.	
Bastin Hall		2020	Home of Baker School of Business. Named for Richard E., '65, and Mary Bastin.	
Bond Hall		1922, 1939	Former home of Baker School of Business, future home of Zucker Family School of Education. Also houses the President and senior administrative staff, the registrar, and other academic staff. Named for Colonel Oliver James Bond, '86, former Superintendent and President of The Citadel.	
Byrd Hall		1968	Home of the Department of Chemistry. Named for Colonel Ralph M. Byrd, '23, The Citadel's first Academic Dean.	
Daniel Library		1960	The main library on The Citadel's campus. The third floor also contains The Citadel's Museum. Named for Charles E. Daniel, '18 and Robert Hugh Daniel, '29.	
Duckett Hall		1970	Home of the Department of Biology. Named for Major General James W. Duckett, '32, former President of The Citadel.	
Grimsley Hall		1991	Home of the Swain Family School of Science and Mathematics and the Physics Department. Named for James Grimsley Jr., '42, former President of The Citadel.	
Jenkins Hall		1964	Home of the ROTC Departments, Commandant's Department and armory. Named for Brigadier General Micah Jenkins, '54.	
LeTellier Hall		1937	Home of the School of Engineering and the Departments of Civil and Mechanical Engineering. Named for Louis LeTellier, former head of the Civil Engineering Department at The Citadel.	
Thompson Hall		1938 (rebuilt in 2001)	Home of the Department of Mathematics and Computer Science. Named for Hugh Smith Thompson, '56, 81st governor of South Carolina.	

== Athletic and recreational buildings ==
Building	Image	Constructed	Notes	Reference
College Park		1939	Former home to the baseball team, currently used as a practice facility.	
Deas Hall		1976	Campus recreational facility, also home to the Department of Health and Exercise Science. Named for Henry "Happy" Deas Jr., '38.	
Earle Tennis Center		1990	Named for O. Perry Earle Jr., '36.	
Inouye Marksmanship Center		2006	Rifle range. Named for Daniel Inouye.	
Johnson Hagood Stadium		1948	Home of the football team. Seats 13,500. Named for Governor Johnson Hagood (governor), '47.	
Joseph P. Riley Jr. Park		1996	Home of The Citadel Bulldogs baseball team. Seats 6,000. Named for Mayor Joseph P. Riley Jr., '64.	
McAlister Field House		1939	Home of the basketball, volleyball and wrestling teams. Seats 6,000. Named for Colonel David S. McAlister, '24.	
Seignious Hall		1982	Meeting rooms and locker rooms for the football team, weight room and sports medicine for all varsity teams. Named for Lieutenant General George M. Seignious, '42, former President of The Citadel.	
Swain Boating Center		2021		
Vandiver Hall		1991	Meeting rooms and locker rooms for all teams other than football. Named for Thomas C. "Nap" Vandiver, '29.	

== Administrative buildings ==
Building	Image	Constructed	Notes	Reference
Coward Hall		1991	Cadet mess hall. Named for Colonel Asbury Coward, '54, former President of The Citadel.	
Mary Bennett Murray Memorial Infirmary		1923	Walk on clinic used by the Corps of Cadets. It has been affiliated with the Medical University of South Carolina since 2022. Named for Mrs. Mary B. Murray.	

== Barracks ==
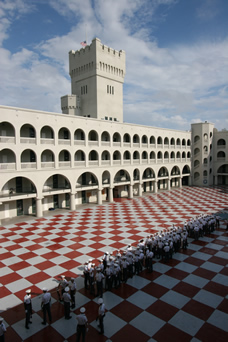

Each of The Citadel's five barracks is built around a central quadrangle of red and white checkerboard style squares. Rooms are arranged along the outer walls with a covered walkway known as the gallery separating rooms from the quadrangle. Of the original four barracks built between 1922 and 1942, only Stevens Barracks has not been demolished and completely rebuilt though it has seen significant renovation. Watts Barracks was constructed in 1996 on the site of the old mess hall. Watts Barracks housed First Battalion while Murray Barracks was under construction before Fourth Battalion occupied Watts Barracks. During the demolition and reconstruction of Padgett-Thomas Barracks from 2000 through 2004, The Regimental Band and Pipes was housed in a temporary structure built behind Stevens Barracks and across Lee Avenue from Watts Barracks. Second and Third Battalions occupied Stevens Barracks during the demolition and reconstruction of Padgett-Thomas Barracks and Law Barracks, respectively.

Building	Image	Constructed	Notes	Reference
Law Barracks		1939 (rebuilt 2007)	Houses Third Battalion, composed of I, K, L and M companies. Named for Major General Evander M. Law.	
Murray Barracks		1926 (rebuilt 1999)	Houses First Battalion, composed of A, B, C, and D companies. Named for Mr. Andrew B. Murray.	
Padgett-Thomas Barracks		1922 (rebuilt 2004)	Houses Regimental Staff and Second Battalion, composed of E, F, G, and H companies, and The Regimental Band and Pipes. Named for Col. John Graham Padgett and Col. John Pulaski Thomas, both longtime members of the Board of Visitors.	
Stevens Barracks		1942	Houses Fifth Battalion, composed of Palmetto Battery, P, S, and V companies. Named for Major Peter Fayssoux Stevens, former Superintendent of The Citadel.	
Watts Barracks		1996	Houses Fourth Battalion, composed of N, O, R, and T companies. Named for Lieutenant General Claudius E. Watts III, former President of The Citadel.	

== Other buildings ==
Building	Image	Constructed	Notes	Reference
Stoney House		1919	Houses The Citadel's Career Center. Named for Mayor Thomas Porcher Stoney.	
Watts House		1923	An event venue and short-term residence for visiting faculty, high-level donors, and VIPs. Located at 169 Moultrie Street, Charleston, SC.	
Holliday Alumni Center		2000	Named for John Monroe Johnson Holliday, '36.	
Mark Clark Hall		1957	Student union, housing gift shop, canteen, Honor Court, Post Office, barber shop, meeting rooms, and an auditorium. Named for General Mark W. Clark, former President of The Citadel.	
Quarters One		1954	Home to the President of The Citadel.	
Robert R. McCormick Beach Club		1958 (rebuilt 1995)	Used for weddings and corporate events. Original structure destroyed by Hurricane Hugo in 1989, rebuilt 1995. Severely damaged in a fire on May 8, 2016. Named for Robert R. McCormick.	
Summerall Chapel		1937	Named for General Charles Pelot Summerall, former President of The Citadel.	

== Monuments and memorials ==
Building	Image	Constructed	Notes	Reference
Howie Bell Tower		1954	Bell tower and Carillon adjacent to Summerall Chapel in honor of Major Thomas D. Howie, the "Major of St. Lo" who was killed leading his battalion in the liberation of St. Lo, France during the Normandy Campaign in 1944.	
HMS Seraph Monument		1963	A monument to HMS Seraph which carried future school President General Mark W. Clark to a secret rendezvous with Vichy French forces in North Africa in 1943. Only shore location in the United States authorized to fly the Royal Navy White Ensign.	
