= History of The Citadel =

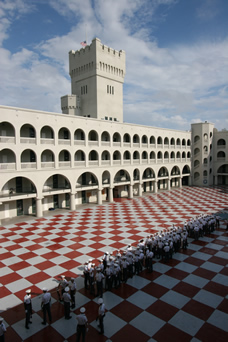
Checkerboard Quadrangle of Padgett Thomas Barracks

The history of the Citadel began in the early 1820s with the formation of a militia and state arsenal in response to an alleged slave revolt in 1822. By 1842 the arsenal grew into an academy, with the Legislature establishing it as the South Carolina Military Academy. Cadets played a key role in the Civil War by assisting in the battalion firing upon a federal ship three months before the war began. Many Confederate officers attended the school. Renamed in 1910 as the Citadel, the school's academic reputation grew. After moving the campus near Hampton Park in 1922, the college has grown substantially. In 1969, graduate student Maxine Hudson became the first woman to earn a degree from the Citadel. The Citadel saw the graduation of its first Black student, Charles D. Foster in 1970, 16 years after legal segregation ended in public schools. Following a rocky journey, the Citadel graduated its first female Cadet, future congresswoman Nancy Mace, in 1999. The school has produced many military officers, business, and political leaders throughout its history.

== Citadel Academy ==
The Citadel traces its origins to an arsenal constructed by the state of South Carolina to defend white Charlestonians against possible uprisings of enslaved people following the thwarted Denmark Vesey rebellion of 1822. In 1829 South Carolina constructed an arsenal on what is now Marion Square in downtown Charleston to house arms and ammunition. The State entered into an agreement in 1830 with the War Department for Federal troops from nearby Fort Moultrie to garrison this new arsenal. State militia replaced them in 1832. Over the next 10 years arsenals throughout the state were consolidated in Charleston and Columbia. Governor John Richardson eventually proposed converting both into military academies based upon the Norwich University model and on December 20, 1842 the South Carolina Legislature passed "an Act to convert the Arsenal at Columbia and the citadel and magazine in and near Charleston, into Military Schools" thereby transforming the two state arsenals into the South Carolina Military Academy. The act specified:

That the students when admitted, shall be formed into a military corps, and shall constitute the public guard of the Arsenal at Columbia, and of the Citadel and Magazine in and near Charleston ... to guard effectually, the public arms and other property at the places aforsaid ...

The first 20 cadets reported to the Citadel Academy at Marion Square in downtown Charleston on March 20, 1843, a date now celebrated as "Corps Day". Initially both schools operated as separate institutions governed by a common Board of Visitors, but in 1845 the Arsenal Academy in Columbia became an auxiliary to the Citadel Academy in Charleston. First year students attended the Arsenal then transferred to the Citadel Academy to complete their education. Both schools continued to operate during the Civil War, but the Arsenal in Columbia was burned by Union forces and never reopened. The only surviving building from the Arsenal is the current Governor's Mansion.

== Mexican–American War ==
Citadel cadets and faculty members trained South Carolina's Palmetto Regiment for service in the Mexican–American War; 17 graduates and cadets fought with the unit which teamed with U.S. Marines to enter the famous "Halls of Montezuma" in Mexico City in 1847. Lt. William J. Magill, a member of the first graduating class of 1846 was the first alumnus to serve in the U.S. Army and was a member of the 3d Dragoons under future President Zachary Taylor in the Mexican War.

== American Civil War and aftermath ==
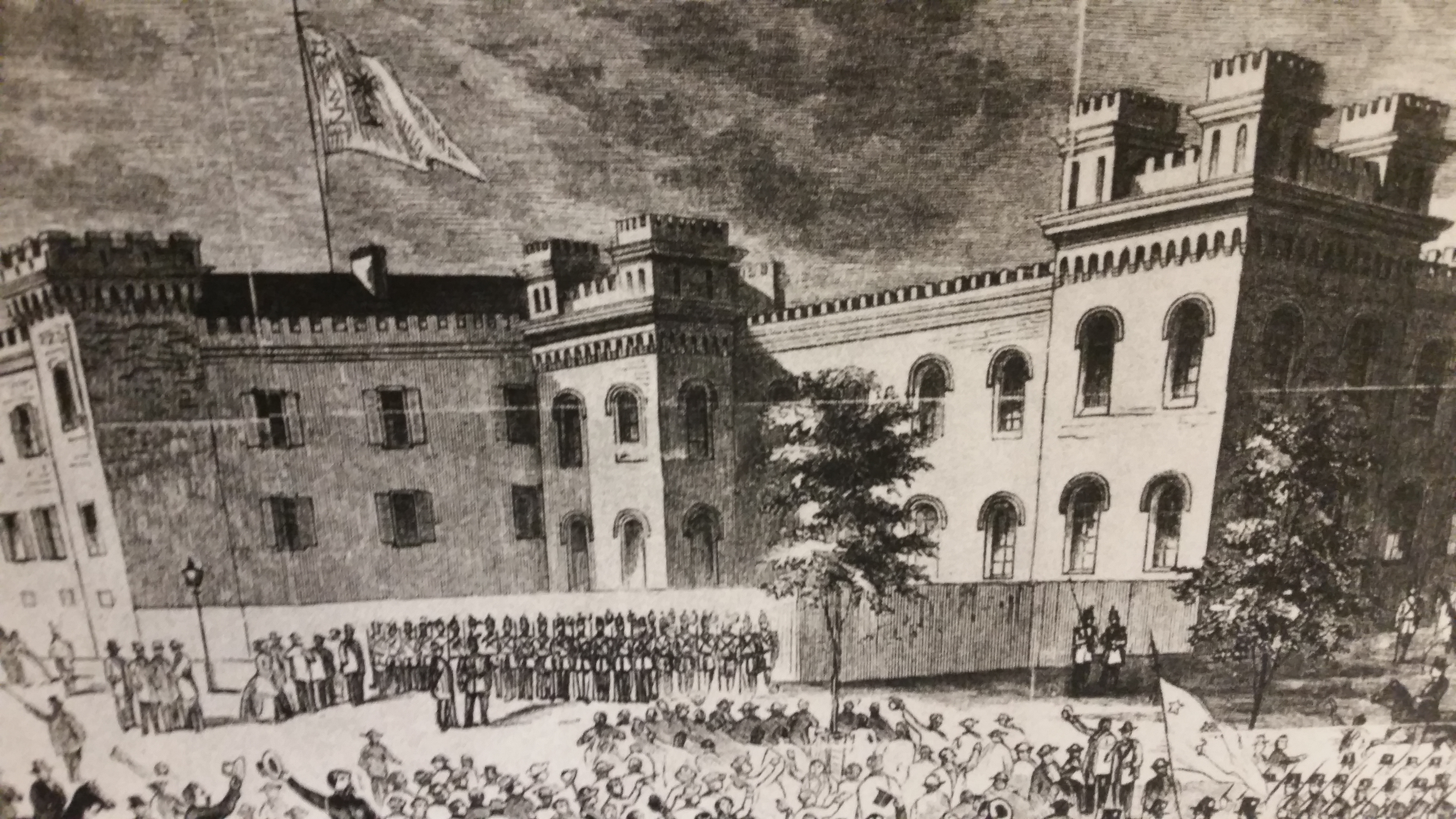
The Citadel at the start of the Civil War

When South Carolina declared that it had seceded from the Union in December 1860, Major Robert Anderson moved his garrison of U.S. troops to Fort Sumter and requested reinforcements from the federal government. On January 9, 1861, a battery on Morris Island manned by Citadel Academy cadets fired on the U.S. steamer Star of the West, preventing it from reaching Fort Sumter with troops and supplies. Along with Confederate troops, Citadel cadets also manned several guns at "the battery" on Charleston harbor during the firing on Fort Sumter of April 12–13, 1861; The first shot of the bombardment is believed by many historians to have been fired by Second Lieutenant Henry S. Farley, Class of 1860.

On January 28, 1861 the Corps of Cadets from the Arsenal Academy (in Columbia) and the Citadel Academy (in Charleston) known as The SC Military Academy was made part of the military organization of the state and named the Battalion of State Cadets. The Academy continued to operate as a military academy, but classes were often disrupted when the governor called the cadets into military service. Mounting and manning heavy guns, performing guard duty, providing security and escorting prisoners were among the services performed by the cadets. The Battalion of State Cadets participated in eight engagements during the Civil War. As a result of these actions, the state of South Carolina authorized the flag of the South Carolina Corps of Cadets to carry the following Confederate battle streamers:

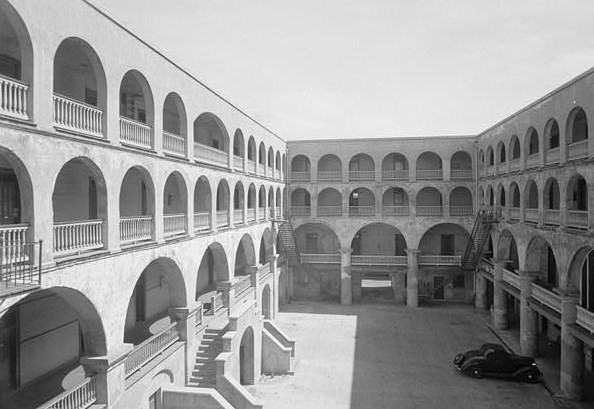
The old Citadel, Charleston in 1940.

1. Confederate States Army
2. Star of the West, January 9, 1861
3. Wappoo Cut, November 1861
4. James Island, June 1862
5. Charleston and Vicinity, July–October 1863
6. James Island, June 1864
7. Tulifinny, December 1864
8. James Island, December 1864 – February 1865
9. Williamston, May 1865

(The Confederate States Army streamer is gray embroidered in silver and the remainder embroidered in blue)

In early December, 1864 Governor Milledge Luke Bonham ordered the Battalion of State Cadets to Tulifinny Creek near Yemassee, South Carolina to join a small Confederate force defending the Charleston and Savannah Railroad. On December 7 and 9 the entire Corps of Cadets from the SCMA fought a much larger Union force (including a contingent of U.S. Marines) in the Battle of Tulifinny, successfully defending the rail line and forcing the Union troops to withdraw; the cadets suffered eight casualties and one cadet died after the battle from his injuries. The Battalion of State Cadets was commended for their display of discipline and gallantry under fire winning the admiration of the veteran troops who fought with them, only The Citadel and The Virginia Military Institute have fought pitched battle with their entire student bodies; The Citadel is also one of only 7 colleges to have received a battle streamer for wartime service. During the Civil War, 43 graduates and 200 former cadets were Killed in Action.

On February 18, 1865, the school ceased operation as a college when Union troops entered Charleston and occupied the site. Following the war, the Board of Visitors eventually regained possession of The Citadel campus and with the urging of Governor Johnson Hagood, Class of 1847, the South Carolina Legislature passed an act to reopen the college. The 1882 session began with an enrollment of 185 cadets.

== Into the 20th century ==
The Citadel bulldog mascot

In the war with Spain in 1898 more Citadel alumni volunteered for service than were needed. In World War I, Citadel graduates were among the first contingents of American troops to fight with the Australian, and later British and French divisions; several served prominently with the Marine Corps at the Battle of Belleau Wood. The name of the college was officially changed in 1910 to "The Citadel, The Military College of South Carolina"; the word "Academy" had become synonymous with secondary schools and the public had the misconception that the South Carolina Military Academy was a preparatory school. By that time the school had outgrown its facility despite numerous additions, in 1918 the city of Charleston offered the state of South Carolina 176 acres (71 ha) on the banks of the Ashley River for a new campus on the condition that the state fund the construction. The state accepted the offer on February 26, 1919 and allotted $300,000 towards the construction of a new campus. In 1921 the title of the head of the school was changed from Superintendent to President, Colonel Oliver J. Bond was the last Superintendent and first President of The Citadel.

The college moved to its current location in 1922; the new campus initially consisted of only a barracks, admin/classroom building, mess hall, gym and hospital but in the next 3 decades grew rapidly. New barracks were constructed in 1926, 1938 and 1942 bringing bed capacity up to nearly 2,000; between 1936 and 1939 a chapel, armory/field house, new mess hall and 2 more academic buildings were added. Capers Hall, the main academic building was built in 1951, a student activities building was added in 1957 and Daniel Library was completed in 1960; Deas Hall, the Physical Education facility opened in 1976.

During World War II, the entire Class of 1944 was drafted and only 2 graduated. By 1943 so many cadets had left school to join the military that enrollment had dropped to less than 500 but was soon bolstered with the addition of active duty service members attending as part of the Army Specialized Training Program. Of the 2,976 living alumni in 1946 all but 49 served their country. Citadel alumni were members of some of the most famous units of the war to include the Flying Tigers, the Doolittle Raiders and the RAF Eagle Squadrons; 280 alumni were Killed in Action, 67 were declared Missing and 65 became Prisoners of War. In the immediate postwar period veteran students utilizing the GI Bill swelled the size of the school to record levels and at one time outnumbered cadets more than 2 to 1.

Starting in the late 1980s a major initiative was begun to renovate older campus facilities and replace aging ones; McAlister Field House underwent an extensive rebuilding in 1987–89 that increased seating capacity from 4,500 to 6,000; in 1991 a new mess hall and classroom building (Grimsley Hall) were completed, a major renovation of the administration building (Bond Hall) was finished in 1993 and the beach house was rebuilt in 1995 after having been destroyed by Hurricane Hugo in 1989. A new barracks was constructed in 1996 and over the next decade three of the original four barracks were razed and rebuilt, the newest academic building (Thompson Hall) was completed in 2003. The Holliday Alumni Center located on Hagood Avenue just south of campus was dedicated in 2001, Johnson Hagood Stadium has had major improvements in recent years including a new field house and reconstruction of the home stands including a new press box tower that features club level seating and luxury boxes.

The growth of the college has allowed for continuously expanding academic offerings; in 1916 only 3 majors were offered, at present 65 courses of study are available at both the undergraduate and postgraduate level. A Graduate School, the first in the Lowcountry area was established in 1968 to fill the educational needs of a growing metropolitan area. In recent years new majors in high demand fields such as Computer Science, Criminal Justice, Sports Management, Nursing and Mechanical Engineering have been established; minors are now offered in diverse subjects including Cybersecurity, East Asian Studies, International Relations, Management Information Systems and African American Studies.

Additional facilities work continues, with a new building for the business school and a rebuilt Capers Hall (home of humanities and social sciences) slated for 2018 and beyond, and a rebuilt boat house and repairs to the beach house also recently undertaken.

== Women in the Corps of Cadets ==
The Corps of Cadets was officially all male until 1996. In 1995, Shannon Faulkner won a two-and-a-half-year legal battle and was granted admission by order of a federal judge. She reported to the campus on the first day of freshman orientation, but was admitted to the school's infirmary immediately following lunch. She left the school after she received dozens of death threats and her family's home was vandalized. A Supreme Court ruling in a discrimination lawsuit against Virginia Military Institute eventually compelled the school to officially change its admission policy to admit women.

The first group of four female cadets matriculated in August 1996; using credits from another school Nancy Mace completed her degree in three years and became the first female graduate in Corps history on May 9, 1999. Czech born Petra Lovetinska was the first female graduate to have attended for four years, the first foreign female cadet, and after receiving her U.S. citizenship by Act of Congress, the first female graduate to be commissioned into the U.S. military. The other two women, Jeanie Mentavlos and Kim Messer, did not remain to finish their first year; they left after experiencing violent "hazing" by the male cadets, being subjected to verbal humiliation, sexual harassment, and physical assault, which included being hit with rifle butts, having kitchen cleanser sprayed in their mouths, and at least one of the women having her sweatshirt doused in flammable liquid and being set on fire. These incidents also led to the dismissal of one cadet, the expulsion of another and the discipline of nine others, as well as lawsuits against the school from each woman, both of whom eventually settled out of court.

In the graduating class of 2012 Shanna M. Couch and Alexandria R. Burns were named First and Second Honor Graduates respectively. This was the first time in school history that either of the top two graduates of a class were women. A four-year starter on the soccer team, Couch was also the first woman at The Citadel to receive an NCAA Postgraduate Scholarship. Burns, a native of Pendleton, South Carolina, was recognised for her remarkable academic achievement by the Anderson County Council in a resolution passed in June 2012.

As of September 2013 women comprise 7% of the Corps of Cadets and 21% of the overall student body.

On March 21, 2018, The Citadel announced that Sarah J. Zorn would serve as Regimental Commander, the highest ranking cadet for the 2018–19 academic year, making her the first woman to hold that position.
