= Padgett-Thomas Barracks =

Dormitory at The Citadel in South Carolina, U.S.

Coordinates: 32.7970°N 79.9614°W

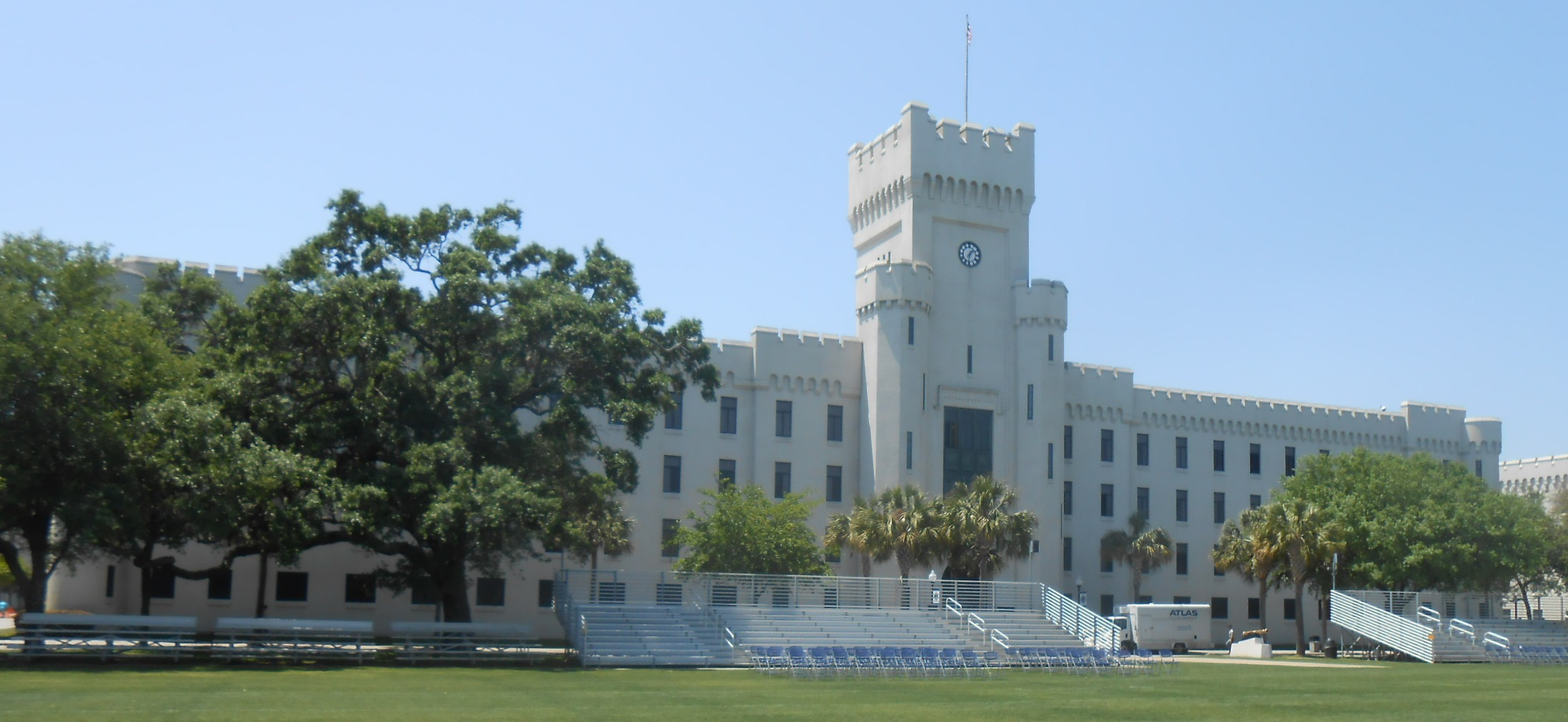

- Location within South Carolina
- Alternative names: PT Barracks, Second Battalion

General information
- Architectural style: Spanish Moorish
- Location: The Citadel, 171 Moultrie Street, Charleston, South Carolina, United States
- Opened: 2004

Height
- Height: 109 feet (33 m)

Technical details
- Floor area: 1922: 102,696 sq ft (9,540.8 m^{2}); 2004:112,335 sq ft (10,436.3 m^{2})

Design and construction
- Architecture firm: Lockwood, Greene & Co. and Coolidge and Shattuck

Other information
- Number of rooms: 265

Padgett-Thomas Barracks is the dominant building on the campus of The Citadel in Charleston, South Carolina. Constructed from 1920 to 1922 as the first building on The Citadel's new site but demolished and replaced from 2000 to 2004, the barracks serves as the living quarters for up to 560 members of the South Carolina Corps of Cadets. The eight-story tower which distinguishes it from the other four, smaller, barracks on Campus of The Citadel is also styled as a brand mark of the military college.

It is located on Jones Avenue, directly across Summerall Field from Summerall Chapel, between Murray Barracks and Law Barracks. Padgett-Thomas Barracks is home to the Second Battalion of the South Carolina Corps of Cadets, composed of E, F, G, and H companies, as well as the Regimental Staff and The Regimental Band and Pipes.

The barracks is named for Col. J. G. Padgett, Class of 1892 and a member of the Board of Visitors, and Col. John Pulaski Thomas, Class of 1893 and member of the Board of Visitors for nearly 35 years, including nearly 25 as its chair.

== Design ==
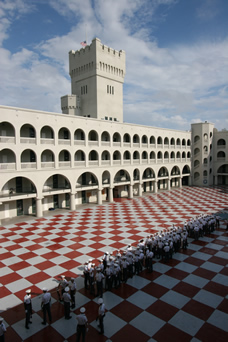
Inside PT Barracks

The barracks is a rectangular shape, originally constructed of masonry with a stucco exterior. It surrounds a central quadrangle, with red and white checkerboard. Each cadet room opens onto a gallery facing the quadrangle. Rooms are approximately 10 feet (3.0 m) by 18 feet (5.5 m) with oak floors, and contain a sink and rifle rack. Like all of the barracks at The Citadel, each corner contains a spiral staircase, and unique to PT Barracks two additional staircases rise alongside the tower.

== Origins and construction ==
By the early 1900s, The Citadel was outgrowing its location at what is now Marion Square, and the business center of the city of Charleston had established itself on one corner of the existing campus. As a result, the city of Charleston and the state of South Carolina agreed to move the college to a portion of Hampton Park along the Ashley River. The cornerstone was laid in late 1920 on the future Padgett-Thomas Barracks, which was to be the centerpiece of the new campus, then composed of just five buildings.

Originally designed with four floors, the ground floor dedicated to a series of support and activity spaces including a carpenter's shop, storage rooms for arms, munitions, and supplies, a barber shop, literary society, and various recreation and other spaces. The upper three floors held 207 cadet rooms, which could house up to 438 cadets. The tower contained a water tank, and while originally designed to stand 11 stories and 203 feet (62 m), it was built to 8 stories and 109 feet (33 m).

== Replacement ==
After many renovations to modernize the facility, including converting all rooms into living spaces, by 2000 school officials had decided to demolish Padgett-Thomas Barracks instead of repairing problems. The Citadel secured federal and state funding to rebuild the barracks and demolished it in the summer of 2001. Construction began in earnest in the 2002 and was completed in time for cadets to move in again in August 2004. The building's appearance is based on the original structure, but utilizes modern construction techniques to provide protection against hurricanes and seismic events. The tower now contains meeting rooms rather than a water tower, providing most of the increased square footage over the original.
