= Daniel Library =

Daniel Library and Museum
- 32.797194°N 79.958817°W
- Location: Charleston, South Carolina
- Type: Academic library
- Established: 1960

The Daniel Library is the main library of The Citadel, and is located on the college's Charleston, South Carolina campus. The library holds approximately 180,000 volumes in addition to extensive digital collections.

== History ==
Originally consisting of a single room in The Citadel Academy's campus at Marion Square from 1842, the Cadet Library continued to expand and evolve throughout the college's history. When The Citadel moved to its present location, a library space was constructed in Bond Hall. In 1960, a dedicated structure was completed and known as "The Memorial Library and Museum." The building was renamed in 1972 in honor of Charles E. Daniel, '18 and Robert Hugh Daniel, '29, both lifelong benefactors of the college.

== Structure and renovations ==
The Daniel Library building was completed in 1960, and is situated on The Citadel's campus along the Avenue of Remembrance and next to Summerall Chapel. It is a three-story building, with stucco exterior in the same Spanish Moorish-style as other buildings on campus. Major renovations were completed in the fall of 2010, which added a central staircase and revamped first and second floor spaces to add technology, group study spaces, and other updating on the then-half century old building. The renovations cost $2.2 million and were financed entirely with private donations, with the lead gift coming from the Daniel Foundation of Alabama, founded by the namesakes of the Library.

== The Citadel Archives and Museum ==
The third floor of the building houses the campus archives and museum. Digital holdings of letters, diaries, and records are also made available online, and display cases, murals, and other exhibits are displayed throughout the library. Among other exhibits, the Museum features displays on cadet life in earlier years and a collection of class rings dating to 1895. Elsewhere in the library are exhibits relating to author Pat Conroy and swords carried in active military service by alumni including Charles Courtenay Tew and James B. White. The archives also host an extensive Oral History program.
