= Education in South Carolina =

Education in South Carolina covers the history and current status of education at all levels, public and private, and related policies.

== History ==
Early education in South Carolina was centered in the home, reflecting the English roots of colonial society. Literacy was low. Wealthy families typically hired tutors or sent their sons to private schools in Charleston. Education for crafts was provided through apprenticeships. Professional physicians and lawyers were trained through working as assistants in the offices of established practitioners. Seminaries were set up for ministers, such as the 1826 Baptist school Furman Academy and Theological Institution (now Furman University). Numerous military academies provided a high-school level education, with The Citadel in Columbia offering a college degree. In the colonial era the missionary society of the Church of England sponsored schools attached to their local parishes. They also taught slaves and established the Charleston Negro School in 1742.

In the 19th century, South Carolina (like other Southern States) had a growing interest in female education. The South Carolina Female Collegiate Institute was located near Columbia and was particularly early (1828) in providing college-level instruction of young women.

Education for freedmen: In 1861–1865 As federal troops occupied the state slavery was abolished and the US Army agency the Freedmen's Bureau set up programs to educate the freed slaves. Teachers were recruited by Northern philanthropic and missionary societies. The two most famous schools are the Penn School on St. Helena Island and the Avery Institute in Charleston. Enthusiasm among freedmen for education was high. Southern whites tolerated schools for Blacks but strongly opposed Yankee teachers. During the Reconstruction era, the Freedmen's Bureau, northern philanthropic and missionary associations, and African American activists established private schools for black youth. Blacks welcomed their newly acquired freedom and citizenship as an avenue to obtain formal schooling and literacy. By 1900, literacy rates rose to 50% from an estimated 5–10% before 1865.

South Carolina maintained a racially segregated elementary, secondary, and post-secondary system of education after Reconstruction. Black public schools within this system were underfunded and did not meet the needs and aspirations of African American communities. However many private schools for Blacks were funded by Northern philanthropy well into the 20th century. Support came from the American Missionary Association; the Peabody Education Fund; the Jeanes Fund (also known as the Negro Rural School Fund); the Slater Fund; the Rosenwald Fund; the Southern Education Foundation; and the General Education Board, which was massively by the Rockefeller family.

The University of South Carolina, founded in 1801 as South Carolina College flourished before the Civil War. It closed during the war and slowly overcame postwar struggles. It was rechartered in 1906 as a university and transformed into a comprehensive institution in the 20th century. In the early decades of the 20th century, South Carolina made strides toward becoming a comprehensive university. In 1917 it became the first state-supported college or university in South Carolina to earn regional accreditation. The Great Depression temporarily stalled progress, but the World War II brought U.S. Navy training programs to campus. Enrollment more than doubled in the post-1945 era as male veterans took advantage of the G.I. Bill.

Until the late 19th century there were almost no public schools and education was left to families. Nonetheless, while historically the state’s support of schooling has been hesitant, sporadic, and limited, the last two decades of the twentieth century witnessed growing attention to schools. By the end of the twentieth century, reform of South Carolina public schools had entered the forefront of political debate.

== Primary and secondary schools ==
As of 2010, South Carolina is one of three states that have not agreed to use competitive international math and language standards.

In 2014, the South Carolina Supreme Court ruled the state had failed to provide a "minimally adequate" education to children in all parts of the state as required by the state's constitution.

South Carolina has 1,144 K–12 schools in 85 school districts with an enrollment of 712,244 as of fall 2009. As of the 2008–2009 school year, South Carolina spent $9,450 per student which places it 31st in the country for per student spending.

In 2015, the national average SAT score was 1490 and the South Carolina average was 1442, 48 points lower than the national average.

South Carolina is the only state which owns and operates a statewide school bus system. As of December 2016, the state maintains a 5,582-bus fleet with the average vehicle in service being fifteen years old (the national average is six) having logged 236,000 miles. Half of the state's school buses are more than 15 years old and some are reportedly up to 30 years old. In 2017 in the budget proposal, Superintendent of Education Molly Spearman requested the state lease to purchase 1,000 buses to replace the most decrepit vehicles. An additional 175 buses could be purchased immediately through the State Treasurer's master lease program. On January 5, 2017, the U.S. Environmental Protection Agency awarded South Carolina more than $1.1 million to replace 57 school buses with new cleaner models through its Diesel Emissions Reduction Act program.

=== Institutions of higher education ===
South Carolina has diverse institutions from large state-funded research universities to small colleges that cultivate a liberal arts, religious or military tradition.

- The College of Charleston, founded in 1770 and chartered in 1785, is the oldest institution of higher learning in South Carolina, the 13th oldest in the United States, and the first municipal college in the country. The college is in company with the Colonial Colleges as one of the original and foundational institutions of higher education in the United States. Its founders include three signers of the United States Declaration of Independence and three signers of the United States Constitution. The college's historic campus, listed on the U.S. Department of the Interior's National Register of Historic Places, forms an integral part of Charleston's colonial-era urban center. The Graduate School of the College of Charleston offers a number of degree programs and coordinates support for its nationally recognized faculty research efforts.
- The University of South Carolina, in Columbia, is a flagship, public, co-educational, research university with seven satellite campuses. It was founded in 1801 as South Carolina College, and its original campus, The Horseshoe, is listed on the National Register of Historic Places. The university's main campus covers over 359 acres (1.5 km^{2}) in the urban core less than one city block from the South Carolina State House. The University of South Carolina has around 35,000 students on the Columbia campus.

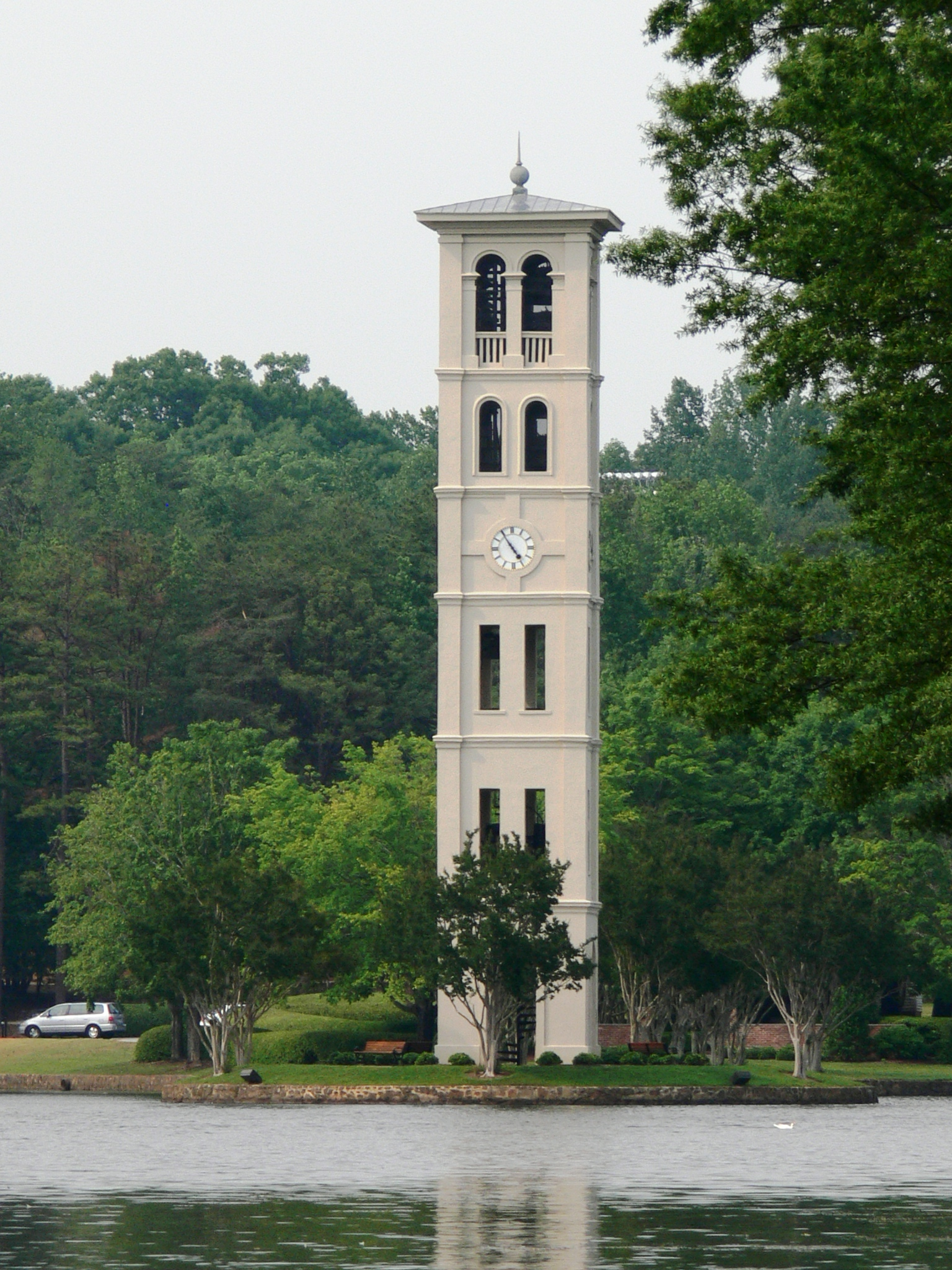
Furman University bell tower near Greenville

- Furman University is a private, coeducational, non-sectarian, liberal arts university in Greenville. Founded in 1826, Furman enrolls approximately 2,900 undergraduate and 500 graduate students. Furman is the largest private institution in South Carolina. The university is primarily focused on undergraduate education (only two departments, education and chemistry, offer graduate degrees).
- Erskine College is a private, coeducational liberal arts college in Due West, South Carolina. The college was founded in 1839 and is affiliated with the Associate Reformed Presbyterian Church, which maintains a theological seminary on the campus.
- The Citadel, The Military College of South Carolina is a state-supported, comprehensive college in Charleston. Founded in 1842, it is best known for its undergraduate Corps of Cadets military program for men and women, which combines academics, physical challenges and military discipline. In addition to the cadet program, the Citadel Graduate College offers evening certificate, undergraduate and graduate programs to civilians. The Citadel has 2,200 undergraduate cadets in its residential military program and 1,200 civilian students in the evening programs.
- Wofford College is a small liberal arts college in Spartanburg. Wofford was founded in 1854 with a bequest of $100,000 from the Rev. Benjamin Wofford (1780–1850), a Methodist minister and Spartanburg native who sought to create a college for "literary, classical, and scientific education in my native district of Spartanburg". It is one of the few four-year institutions in the southeastern United States founded before the American Civil War that operates on its original campus.
- Newberry College is a small liberal arts college in Newberry. Founded in 1856, Newberry is a co-educational, private liberal-arts college of the Evangelical Lutheran Church in America (ELCA) on a historic 90-acre (36 ha) campus in Newberry, South Carolina. It has roughly 1,110 students and a 14:1 student-teacher ratio. According to U.S. News & World Report's America's Best Colleges, Newberry College ranks among the nation's top colleges in the southern region.
- Claflin University, founded in 1869 by the American Missionary Association, is the oldest historically black college in the state. After the Democratic-dominated legislature closed the university in 1877, before passing a law to restrict admission to whites, it designated Claflin as the only state college for blacks.
- Lander University is a public liberal arts university in Greenwood. Lander was founded in 1872 as Willamston Female College. The school moved to Greenwood in 1904 and was renamed Lander College in honor of its founder, Samuel Lander. In 1973 Lander became part of the state's higher education system and is now a co-educational institution. The university is focused on undergraduate education and enrolls approximately 3,000 undergraduates.
- Presbyterian College (PC) is a private liberal arts college founded in 1880 in Clinton. Presbyterian College enrolls around 1000 undergraduate students and around 200 graduate students in its pharmacy school. In 2007, Washington Monthly ranked PC as the No. 1 Liberal Arts College in the nation.
- Winthrop University, founded in 1886 as an all-female teaching school in Rock Hill, became a co-ed institution in 1974. It is now a public university with an enrollment of just over 6,100 students. It is one of the fastest growing universities in the state, with several new academic and recreational buildings being added to the main campus in the past five years, as well as several more planned for the near future. The Richard W. Riley College of Education is still the school's most well-known area of study.
- Clemson University, founded in 1889, is a public, coeducational, land-grant research university in Clemson. It has more than 19,000 undergraduate students and 5,200 graduate students from all 50 states and from more than 70 countries. Clemson is also the home to the South Carolina Botanical Garden.
- North Greenville University, founded in 1891, is a comprehensive university in Tigerville. It is affiliated with South Carolina Baptist Convention and the Southern Baptist Convention, and is accredited by the Commission on Colleges of the Southern Association of Colleges and Schools. It has an enrollment of around 2,500 undergraduates.
- South Carolina State University, founded in 1896, is a historically black university in Orangeburg. SCSU has an enrollment of nearly 5,000, and offers undergraduate, graduate and post-graduate degrees. SCSU boasts the only Doctor of Education program in the state.
- Anderson University, founded in 1911, is a selective comprehensive university that offers bachelor's and master's degrees. It enrolls about 2,900 students.
- Webster University, founded in 1915 in St. Louis, Missouri, with five extended campuses in South Carolina, offers undergraduate and graduate degrees.
- Bob Jones University, founded in 1927, is a private, non-denominational and conservative Christian liberal arts university with a 2019 total enrollment of 3,000. BJU offers more than 60 undergraduate majors and 70 graduate programs.
- Coastal Carolina University, founded in 1954, became an independent state-supported liberal arts university in 1993. The university enrolls approximately 10,500 students on its 307-acre (1.24 km^{2}) campus in Conway, part of the Myrtle Beach metropolitan area. Baccalaureate programs are offered in 51 major fields of study, along with graduate programs in education, business administration (MBA), and coastal marine and wetland studies.
- Charleston Southern University, founded in 1969, is a liberal arts university, and is affiliated with the South Carolina Baptist Convention. Charleston Southern (CSU) is on 300 acres, formerly the site of a rice and indigo plantation, in the City of North Charleston one of South Carolina's largest accredited, independent universities, enrolling approximately 3,400 students.
- Francis Marion University, formerly Francis Marion College, is a state-supported liberal arts university near Florence, South Carolina. It was founded in 1970 and achieved university status in 1992.

=== Universities and colleges ranked by endowment, 2010 ===
State rank	National rank	Institution	Location	Public / private?	Endowment funds	Percentage change YOY
1	142	Furman University	Greenville	Private	$650,000,000	7.8%
2	151	University of South Carolina	Columbia & regional campuses	Public	$625,186,000	6.0%
3	153	Clemson University	Clemson	Public	$623,200,000	9.5%
4	236	Medical University of South Carolina	Charleston	Public	$272,319,000	13.7%
5	270	The Citadel	Charleston	Public	$244,000,000	8.1%
6	324	Wofford College	Spartanburg	Private	$166,619,000	10.2%
7	447	Presbyterian College	Clinton	Private	$97,590,000	11.0%
8	530	Converse College	Spartanburg	Private	$78,240,004	6.4%
9	782	Winthrop University	Rock Hill	Public	$43,600,000	13.6%
10	658	Coker College	Hartsville	Private	$37,660,000	4.9%

== See also ==
- History of education in the Southern United States
