= Swain Family School of Science and Mathematics =

Part of The Citadel, Charleston, South Carolina, USA

- Established: 2002
- Parent institution: The Citadel
- Dean: Darin T. Zimmerman, Ph.D.
- Location: Charleston, South Carolina, US; 32.798923°N 79.961088°W
- Website: www.citadel.edu/root/ssm

The Swain Family School of Science and Mathematics is one of the five schools comprising The Citadel in Charleston, South Carolina. The school offers bachelor's and master's degrees in a variety of fields, as well as minors and certificates. It was established in 2002 as The Citadel reorganized its existing departments into the five schools. On June 1, 2018, The Citadel announced the naming of the school for the Swain Family, in recognition of major gifts provided by brothers David C. Swain, Jr., Class of 1980, and his wife Mary, as well as Dr. Christopher C. Swain, Class of 1981, and his wife Debora.

Five academic departments compose the school, including Biology; Chemistry; Mathematics and Computer Science; Health, Exercise, and Sports Sciences; and Physics. The school is headquartered in Grimsley Hall along with the Physics Department, but the Departments are spread among several buildings on campus, including Thompson Hall (Mathematics and Computer Science), Byrd Hall (Chemistry), Duckett Hall (Biology), and Deas Hall (Health, Exercise, and Sports Sciences).

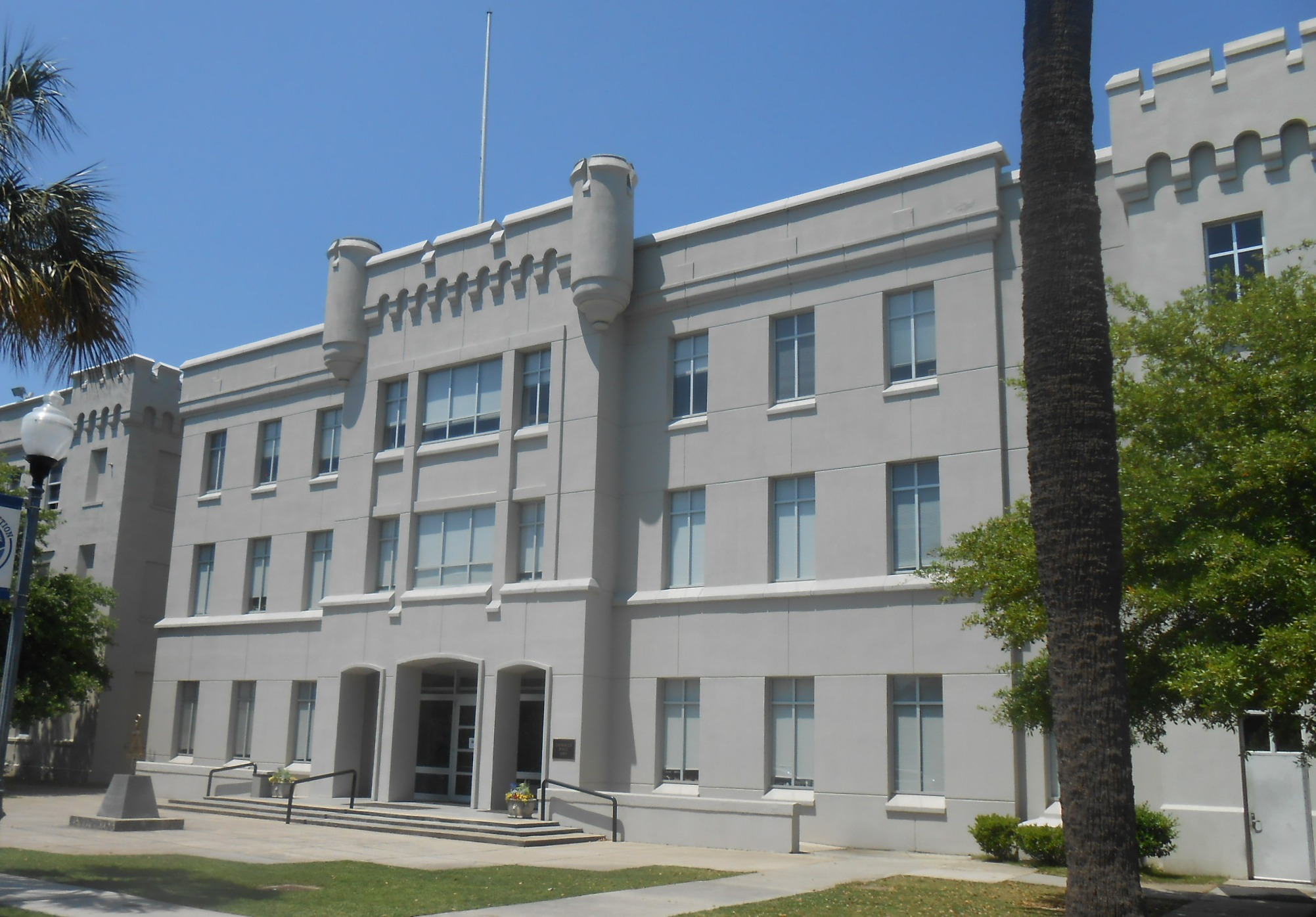
Grimsley Hall, home of the School of Science and Mathematics and the Physics Department.

The School is home to a graduate certificate in cyber security, which combined with the School of Humanities and Social Sciences programs focusing on homeland security and intelligence analysis, have earned recognition from the National Security Agency, as the program has been designated a Center of Academic Excellence in Cyber Defense.

In cooperation with the Zucker Family School of Education and School of Engineering, the school in 2009 established and supports The Citadel's STEM Center for Excellence, to prepare students for STEM careers through a variety of programs, including the "Storm the Citadel" Engineering week, summer camps, and scholarships.

In 2013, the National Science Foundation awarded $1.2 million for scholarships in teaching science and mathematics at the secondary level, which are jointly awarded by the School of Science and Mathematics and the Zucker Family School of Education to undergraduate and graduate students.

In January 2017, the school launched a nursing program, offered to evening undergraduates with two years of college credit, as well as the South Carolina Corps of Cadets. Funded by a $4 million anonymous donation, the program is intended to address the need both in the armed services and the Charleston area for qualified nurses.
