= Sarah J. Zorn =

American regimental commander

Sarah J. Zorn is the first woman in the history of the 175-year old Citadel Military College to lead the South Carolina Corps of Cadets as the regimental commander. The official ceremony in which Zorn took over the leadership, in which a gilt-handled sword was handed to her from her predecessor, Dillon Graham, took place on May 4, 2018. She has three black belts in karate Zorn's mother, who served in the United States Air Force, died when Zorn was 16 years old. Zorn earned a four-year Army scholarship and will serve in the military for at least 5 years after graduation. She is from Warrenville, South Carolina, and majored in Business Administration. She attended Midland Valley High School in Aiken County, and began her studies at the Citadel in 2015. Upon her graduation from The Citadel, she commissioned into the United States Army as an artillery officer, where she currently serves as a HIMARS platoon leader.
