= Robert Hugh Daniel =

- Born: September 1, 1906; Anderson, South Carolina, U.S.
- Died: October 27, 1983 (aged 77); Birmingham, Alabama, U.S.
- Occupations: Founder, Chairman and Chief Executive Officer
- Known for: Chief Executive Officer of Daniel International Corporation philanthropist
- Spouse: Martha Stone Cobb Daniel
- Children: 2

Robert Hugh Daniel (September 1, 1906 - October 27, 1983) was the chairman and chief executive officer of Daniel International Corporation which he founded, along with his brother, in 1934. Daniel International, headquartered in Greenville, South Carolina, and Birmingham, Alabama, grew to become one of the largest construction and engineering firms in the world. In 1977 Daniel International was acquired by Fluor Corporation. He was also the founder of the Daniel Foundation of Alabama, which is one of the largest charitable foundations in Alabama. Daniel and his wife lived in Mountain Brook, Alabama. Hugh died on October 27, 1983, in Birmingham.

== Personal life ==
R. Hugh Daniel attended The Citadel, The Military College of South Carolina in Charleston in the class of 1929, there he played on the varsity football and basketball team and was also the editor of the college newspaper, The Bulldog. After college, he was a Lieutenant Commander in the United States Navy. After his duties were finished in the Navy, he then became very successful in the construction business in Alabama and was also widely recognized for his philanthropic endeavors. He died on October 27, 1983. During his life Daniel was involved in the Kiwanis Club of Birmingham, The Birmingham Chamber of Commerce, the Canterbury Methodist Church, he was a member of the Birmingham Country Club, The Mountain Brook Club, the Relay House, and the Chi Psi fraternity.

== Business ==
R. Hugh Daniel and his brother Charles founded the Daniel Corporation in 1934. The company, as founded by Daniel and now as part of Fluor, specializes in large scale construction, real estate, and industrial contracting. The business grew to over 40,000 employees and produced over $950 million in revenue in 1975, two years before it was acquired by the Fluor Corporation in 1977. The corporation was known as Fluor Daniel until 2002, when “Daniel” was dropped from the name. Daniel was also the chairman of the board of directors for the Central Bank of Birmingham, now BBVA Compass. and served on the board of the bank's parent corporation Central Bancshares, Inc., served as a director for the Birmingham Museum of Art and the Baptist Hospitals Foundation, as well as several companies.

== Philanthropy ==
The Daniel Foundation, based in Birmingham, Alabama, was established by R. Hugh and Charles E. Daniel in 1954 and is an endowment overseen by the Citadel Board of Visitors. It has allocated grant scholarships, athletics, discretionary funds, and supports the Citadel. It has also contributed generous donations to the music department of UAB to honor the late Martha Stone Cobb Daniel, widow of Mr. Daniel. The Daniel Library located at the Citadel was dedicated to the Daniel brothers in 1960 for their various contributions to the institution. The brothers also erected a carillion, completed in 1984 shortly after Daniel's death in honor of Thomas Dry Howie, a classmate at the Citadel. R. Hugh Daniel also donated the Daniel building in Greenville to the Citadel. In 1980, the 25 story structure was the largest gift any college in the nation had ever received at the time. In 2010, the Daniel Foundation provided $1.5 million for a major renovation of Daniel Library, with a new entry, group study spaces, and technology.
