= The Citadel School of Engineering =

- Established: 2002
- Parent institution: The Citadel
- Dean: Andrew B. Williams, Ph.D.
- Location: Charleston, South Carolina, U.S. 32.798753°N 79.961435°W
- Website: www.citadel.edu/root/engineering

The Citadel School of Engineering is one of the five schools comprising The Citadel in Charleston, South Carolina. The school offers bachelor's and master's degrees as well as graduate certificates in several Engineering specialties. Established in 2002, The Citadel later reorganized its existing departments into five schools. Engineering has been a part of The Citadel's educational program since the founding of the school in 1842, and so ranks as the 5th oldest engineering program in the nation. The civil and mechanical engineering programs are housed in Letellier Hall while electrical engineering and engineering leadership are in Grimsley Hall.

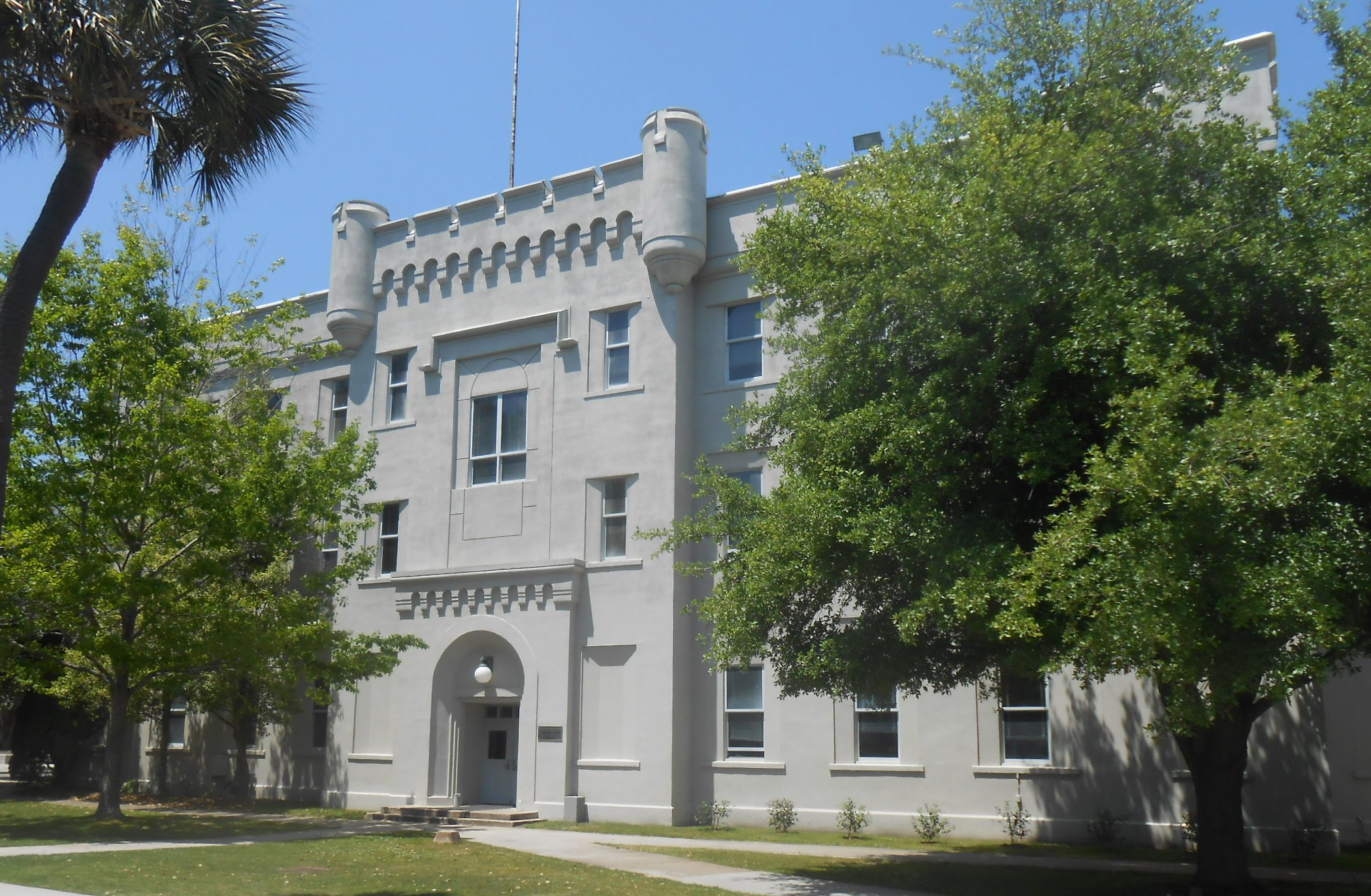
Letellier Hall, home of the Civil Engineering and Mechanical Engineering programs.

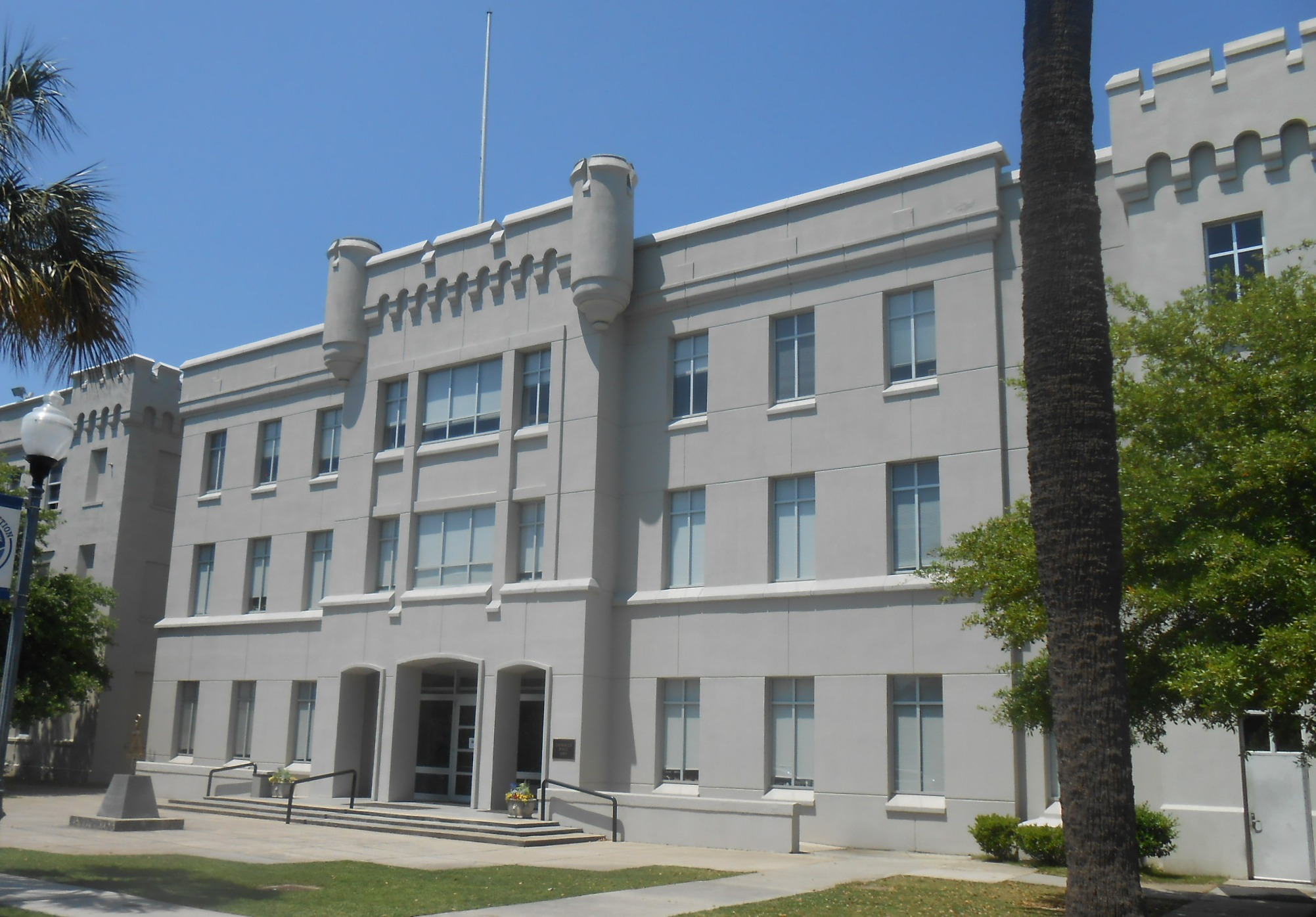
Grimsley Hall, home of the Electrical Engineering and Engineering Leadership programs.

U.S. News & World Report ranked The Citadel's School of Engineering 22nd among all undergraduate engineering programs without doctoral degrees in the United States in 2015, the fifth straight year that the school has been in the Top 25.

The School of Engineering consists of four departments: Civil and Environmental Engineering; Electrical and Computer Engineering; Engineering Leadership and Program Management; and Mechanical Engineering. These departments offer three undergraduate majors, four master's degree programs, and a series of graduate certificates. The Program Management master's was added in 2010 and is unique in South Carolina. Additionally, the Mechanical Engineering program was added in 2014.

In cooperation with the Zucker Family School of Education and Swain Family School of Science and Mathematics, the school in 2009 established and supports The Citadel's STEM Center for Excellence, to prepare students for STEM careers through a variety of programs, including the "Storm the Citadel" Engineering week, summer camps, and scholarships.
