= South Carolina Corps of Cadets =

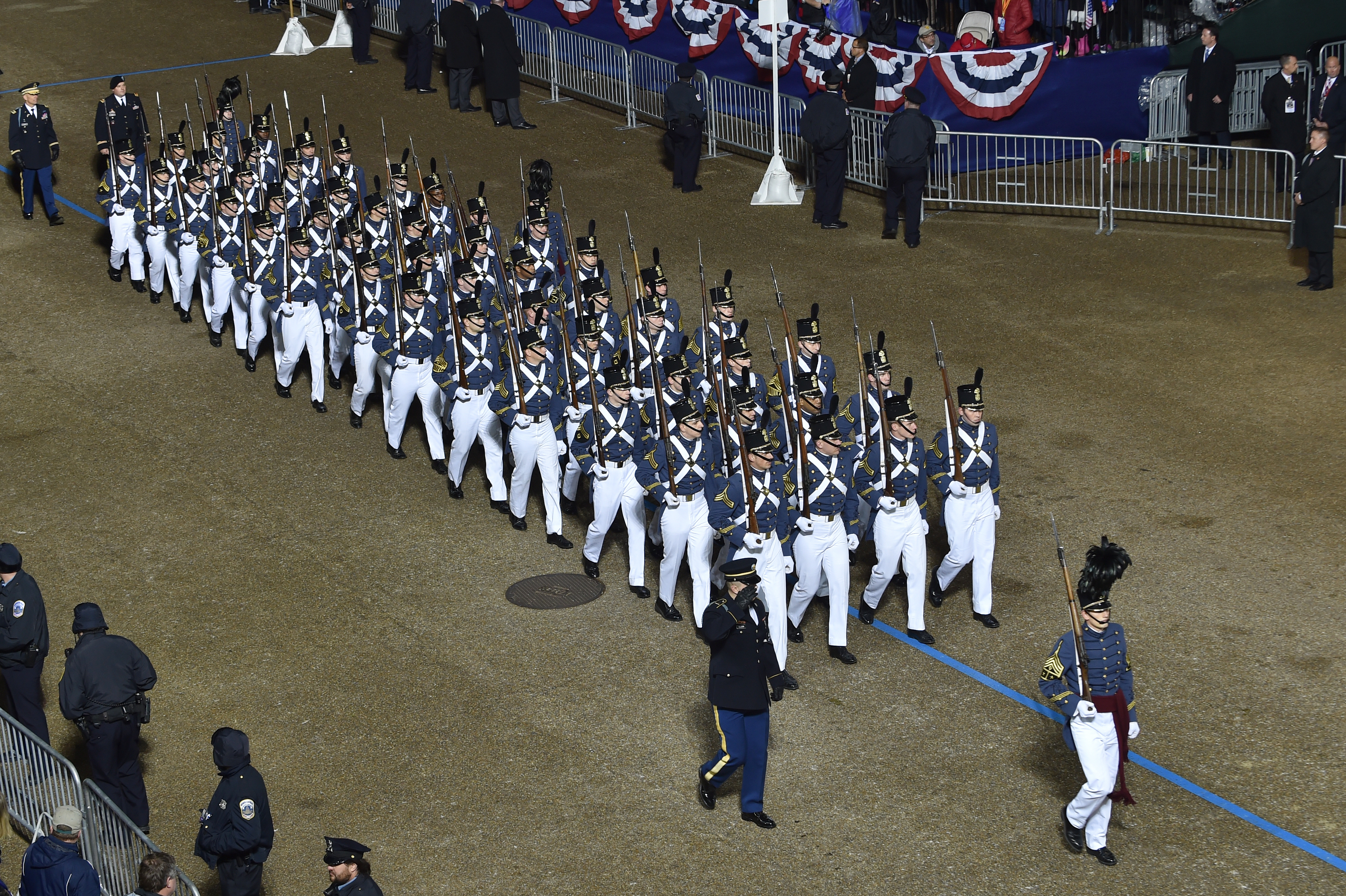
- The Summerall Guards
- Active: March 20, 1842–present
- Country: United States; South Carolina
- Type: Senior Military College
- Role: Leadership Development
- Size: One regiment: ~2300 cadets
- Part of: The Citadel
- Garrison/HQ: RS: Padgett-Thomas Barracks; 1st Battalion: Murray Barracks; 2nd Battalion: Padgett-Thomas Barracks; 3rd Battalion: Law Barracks; 4th Battalion: Watts Barracks; 5th Battalion: Stevens Barracks
- Nicknames: The Herd (3rd Battalion); The Zoo (4th Battalion); The Misfits (5th Battalion)
- Mottos: "Honor, Duty, Respect"
- Mascot: English Bulldog
- Anniversaries: Corps Day (20 March)
- Engagements: Star of the West; Wappoo Cut; James Island; Charleston and Vicinity; James Island; Tulifinny; James Island; Williamston

Commanders
- President of The Citadel: General Glenn M. Walters, USMC (ret.)
- Commandant of Cadets: Colonel Thomas J. Gordon, USMC (ret.)
- Abbreviation: SCCC

The South Carolina Corps of Cadets is the military component of the student body at The Citadel in Charleston, South Carolina, United States. The Corps of Cadets is the only residential, full-time undergraduate program at The Citadel, focusing on educating the "whole person."

== Organization ==
The South Carolina Corps of Cadets constitutes a regiment which is headed by a cadet colonel and their regimental staff. Under the cadet colonel, cadet lieutenant colonels, along with their respective battalion staff, command the barracks in which the cadets live. Within each battalion are typically four companies, each commanded by a cadet captain and their respective staff platoon. There are twenty-one companies in the Corps of Cadets, with nineteen being rifle companies, one being an artillery company (the Palmetto Battery), and the last being the Regimental Band. The Regimental Band is unique in the fact that it is larger than the other companies and, as such, is commanded by a cadet major.

The battalions are housed in their separate barracks, and each company is allocated a corner of the battalion, with each corner proudly displaying each company's "letter". The First Battalion is based in Murray Barracks and comprises Alpha, Bravo, Charlie, and Delta companies. The Second Battalion is based out of Padgett-Thomas Barracks and consists of Regimental Staff, Echo, Foxtrot, Golf, Hotel, and the Regimental Band (which lives on the first floor of the battalion). The Third Battalion is based out of Law Barracks and consists of India, Kilo, Lima, and Mike Companies. The Fourth Battalion is based out of Watts Barracks and consists of November, Oscar, Tango, and Romeo companies. The Fifth Battalion is based out of Stevens Barracks and consists of Palmetto Battery, Sierra, Papa, and Victor Companies. Within each company are three platoons, each headed by a platoon leader (a cadet second lieutenant). Within each platoon are three squads, each headed by a squad sergeant (a cadet sergeant). The squad is the smallest unit in the Corps of Cadets.

== Rank ==
The regimental commander holds the rank of cadet colonel, while the battalion commanders and regimental executive officer hold the rank of cadet lieutenant colonel. Regimental staff officers, battalion executive officers and the band company commander are cadet majors, while company commanders and battalion staff officers are cadet captains. Company executive officers and select company staff positions (like executive and academic officers) are cadet first lieutenants, and platoon leaders and the remaining company staff positions are cadet second lieutenants. All officer positions are filled by seniors.

The SCCC operates a cadet-run Honor Committee, whose members are seniors. Within this committee are ten distinct cadet officers appointed with rank. The chairman of the committee is appointed a cadet lieutenant colonel and is assigned to regimental staff. The four honor vice chairmen are appointed cadet majors and are assigned to regimental staff. The five battalion honor representatives are appointed cadet majors and are assigned to their respective battalion staffs. While these officers operate under the rank structure of the SCCC, the mission of these officers is outside the realm and jurisdiction of regular cadet officers. The roles of company honor representative and athletic team honor representative are billets that are not appointed rank. However, many company and athletic team honor representatives hold rank within the Corps of Cadets.

As all cadet officer positions are held by seniors, senior NCO positions are held by juniors. Positions such as regimental sergeant major, battalion sergeant major, company first sergeant, and academic and supply sergeants are known as sword-bearing ranks, due to their carrying a sword and wearing the officer red sash during parades and other inspections. All other sergeant positions like platoon sergeants and squad sergeants do not wear swords, and instead march with rifles and no sashes during parades. The one exception to this is the cadre platoon sergeant. Cadre is the team that trains the incoming freshmen for their first two months at the school, and as such the role of cadre platoon sergeant is considered by many within the Corps as an "honorary" sword-bearing rank.

The remaining (and second lowest rank within the corps) is that of the corporal. All corporal positions are held by sophomores, and the rank is most commonly found within the individual companies. Sophomores holding corporal rank may hold one of three different positions. The first is that of regimental, battalion, or company clerk. Within the corps, there are three regimental clerks, while within the battalion and company levels, there are two. The second role is that of squad corporal. Existing within the companies only, this role is to assist the individual squad sergeants. The third and final role is that of the armorer. Armorers are responsible for the accountability and cleaning of each company's complement of M-14 rifles used during parades and inspections; this position only exists at the company level.

=== Insignias ===
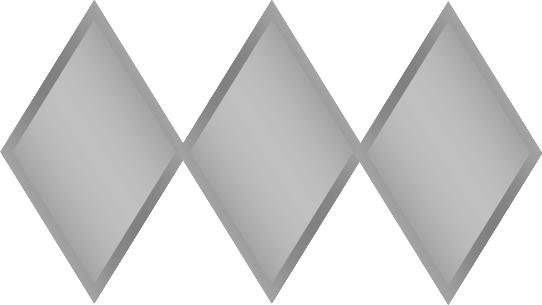
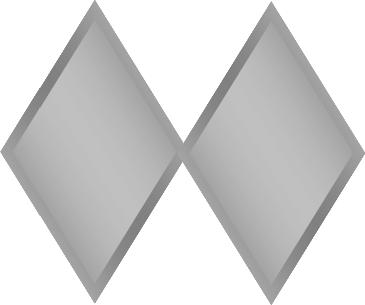
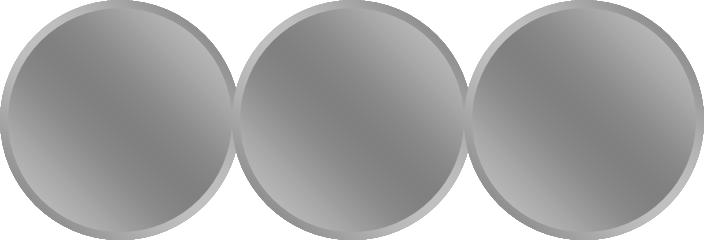
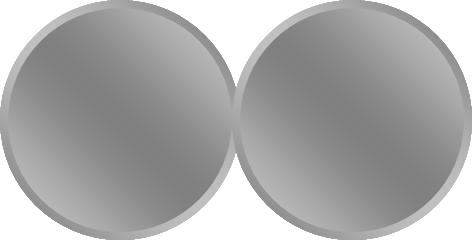
Insignia
Rank	Cadet Colonel^{1}	Cadet Lieutenant Colonel	Cadet Major	Cadet Captain	Cadet 1st Lieutenant	Cadet 2nd Lieutenant
^{1}The Regimental Commander

== Class system ==
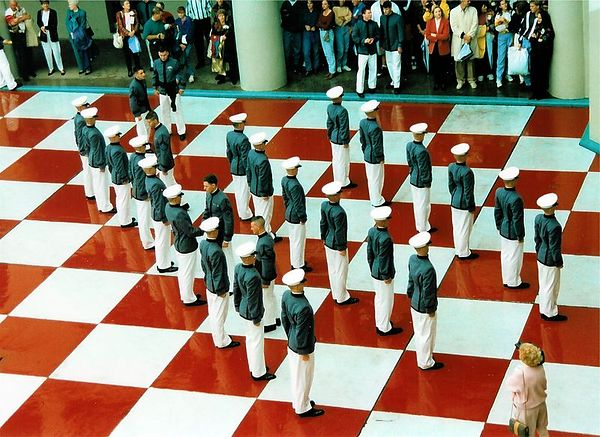
Knobs on the quad

Cadets progress through a four-year structure which determines their eligibility for leadership positions, as well as various privileges including the number of overnight's and weekend leaves which can be exercised each academic semester. The structure is largely independent of academic standing, particularly during the first year, in which all cadets are known as "knobs" and must follow a prescribed system of training known as the Fourth Class System. Knobs are expected to walk at 120 paces per minute anywhere on campus, utilize specific entrances and exits from buildings, walk only in designated areas, salute commissioned and cadet officers, and memorize information including historical facts and the menu in the mess hall. While in the barracks, knobs must "brace," or pull their chin in, roll their shoulders back, and tuck their arms tightly against the sides of their body. Many other requirements, such as military drill and inspections, exist in order to expose the cadets to the traditions and values of The Citadel and to build camaraderie and bonds between the knobs.

The Fourth Class System is unique among other senior military Colleges, in that it is the only freshman training period lasting a full nine months. The end of this training period is marked by Recognition Day, near the end of the second semester, which includes a march to Marion Square, where the cadet oath is repeated while facing the Old Citadel after a final physical challenge on campus where they are recognized.

Upperclass cadets remain subject to inspections and participate in military drill, and attend additional leadership training through the Krause Center for Leadership and Ethics throughout their cadet careers, gaining more and more privileges as a class at each grade level.

== Cadet life ==
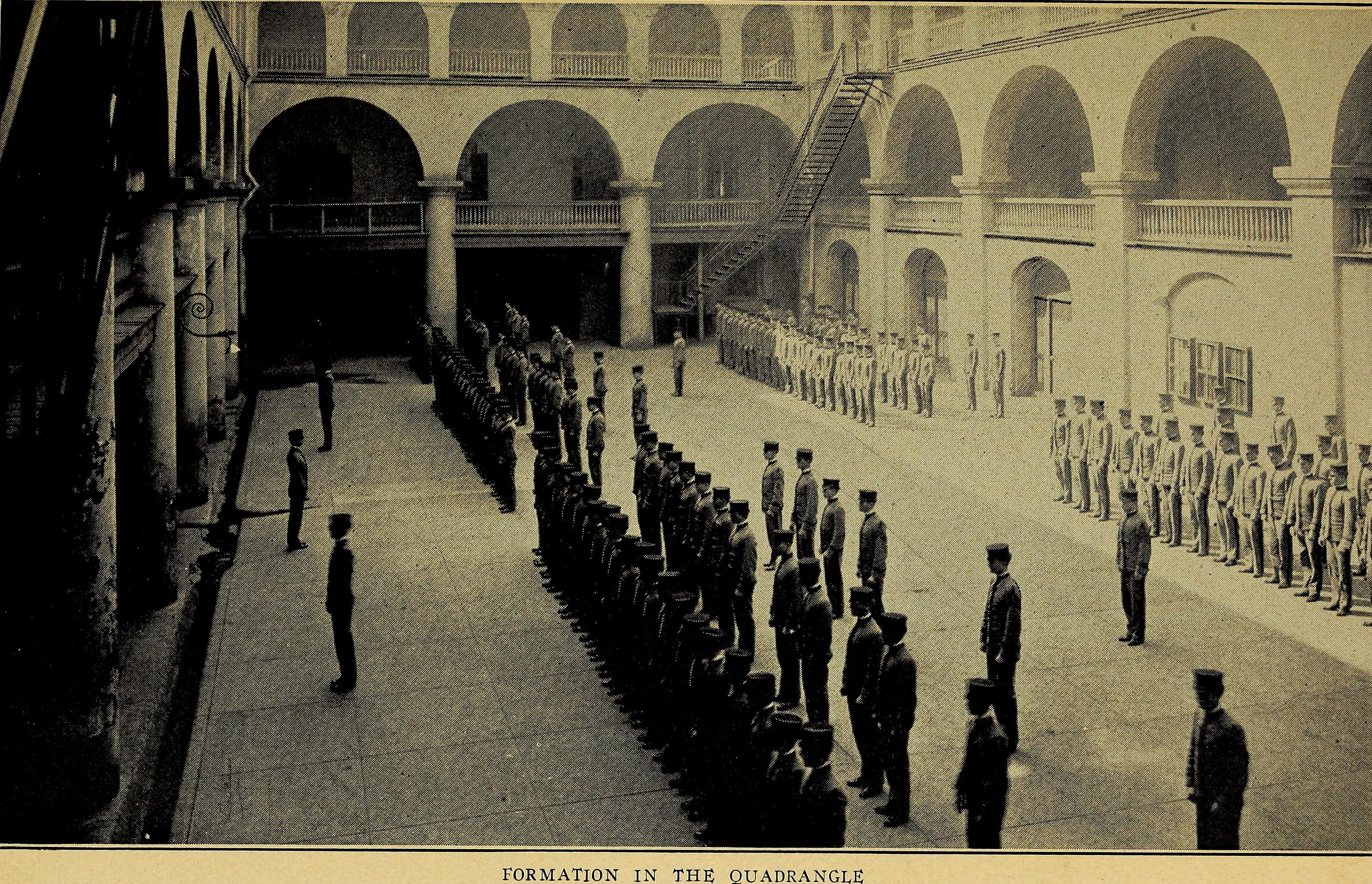
Formation in the early 1900s

Day-to-day life is highly regimented at The Citadel. Two mornings per week, regimental physical training is conducted at the company level on Summerall Field before the start of the academic day. Classes are conducted after the daily morning formation, and typically last from eight in the morning until three in the afternoon. Additionally, Cadets participate in two mandatory drill ceremonies a week. On Thursdays, a practice parade is held in preparation for Friday's review parades. For most of the week, all cadets are not allowed to leave campus. All classes are allowed general leave on Wednesdays after classes have ended. As well as, on the weekends beginning on Fridays (after parade) and ending on Sundays before the start of evening study period. Seniors may also leave on Mondays. Weekdays are typically ended with an evening formation, after which all cadets have a designated evening study period until lights-out at 2300.

All cadets may participate in a number of activities, including varsity sports as members of The Citadel Bulldogs teams, club teams, drill teams including the Summerall Guards and the Junior Sword Arch, the newspaper The Brigadier, and a variety of other programs designed to enhance the academic, military, spiritual/ethical, and physical growth of each cadet.

=== Honor Court ===
All cadets live by a strict honor code, which states, "A Cadet does not lie, cheat, or steal, nor tolerate those who do." The system is run by the cadet Honor Court, which conducts investigations, trials, and recommends sanctions. The typical sanction is expulsion.

The honor court consists of seniors who are elected in the spring of their junior year and continue to be honor representatives until their graduation the following spring. Each company elects two rising seniors to be honor representatives. Every NCAA-sponsored team at The Citadel elects one of their rising seniors to be an honor representative. In contrast, each Battalion elects one rising senior (who must have been elected at the company level first) to represent the battalion. After this preliminary round of elections, all new honor representatives (battalion, company, and NCAA) meet to elect the Chairman of the Honor Court (a Cadet Lieutenant Colonel) and his Vice Chairs of Education, Operations, Investigations, and Defence (each a Cadet Major). Battalion honor representatives are each Cadet Majors, while company and NCAA representatives hold no formal ranks.

These honor representatives hold both judicial power at the school while simultaneously serving in an educational role. The job description not only includes forming the court, investigating honor violations, conducting trials based on evidence and recommending sanctions, but also instructing the corps on the purpose of honor, writing, amending, and distributing the current years honor manual, which includes training members of the staff, faculty, and cadets on all matters relating to honor or the honor court on campus.

The Honor Court serves as a plot point in Pat Conroy's The Lords of Discipline, in which the main character, Will McLean, serves on the Carolina Military Institute's cadet Honor Court. Pat Conroy himself was a member of the Citadel's Honor Court during his time as a cadet.

=== The Regimental Band and Pipes ===
Founded in 1909, the Regimental Band and Pipes at The Citadel is one of the institution's most recognisable units. Representing the Citadel at numerous tattoos around the world, it is one of the foremost cadet bands in the United States. While officially the Band is under the purview of Regimental Staff, they are administratively assigned to Second Battalion, and inhabit the entire ground floor of Padgett-Thomas Barracks.
