= Krause Center for Leadership and Ethics =

- Established: 2001
- Parent institution: The Citadel
- Director: Col. Tom Clark
- Location: Charleston, South Carolina, U.S. 32.795157°N 79.959068°W
- Website: www.citadel.edu/root/krausecenter

The Krause Center for Leadership and Ethics coordinates the leadership and ethical programs at The Citadel in South Carolina. The Center, established in 2001, oversees the Four-Year Leader Development Model in which all cadets progress through leadership training.

The Krause Center currently occupies a building behind Bond Hall, at the corner of Richardson Avenue and Mims Avenue, on The Citadel's Charleston, South Carolina campus.

== History ==
In 2001, L. William Krause and his wife donated $2 million to establish the Krause Center, and begin coordinating leadership and ethics training at The Citadel. They later donated an additional $9 million to expand the center and endow the curriculum.

Executive Directors

Name	Tenure
LTC Jeff Weart	2003–2010
BG Harrison Carter	2010–2012
Col. Joe Trez	2012–2015
Col. Tom Clark	2015–present

== Programs ==
The core function of the Krause Center is the development of principled leaders, in line with The Citadel's mission. For the Corps of Cadets, the Krause Center oversees and implements the Four-Year Leader Model, which provides leadership training and experiences for all cadets. This model consists of courses for each class and specialized experiences, including a Leadership Day of Service and Honor system training.

- Principled Leadership Symposium
