= James Grimsley Jr. =

United States Army general

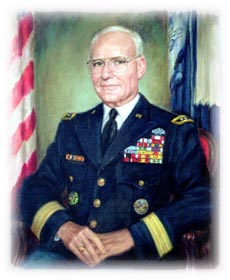
- Born: James Alexander Grimsley Jr. November 14, 1921; Florence, South Carolina
- Died: June 11, 2013 (aged 91); Charleston, South Carolina
- Burial place: Beaufort National Cemetery
- Military career
- Allegiance: United States of America
- Branch: United States Army
- Service years: 1942–1975
- Rank: Major General
- Conflicts: World War II; Vietnam War
- Awards: Silver Star; Legion of Merit; Bronze Star; Purple Heart
- Other work: President of The Citadel

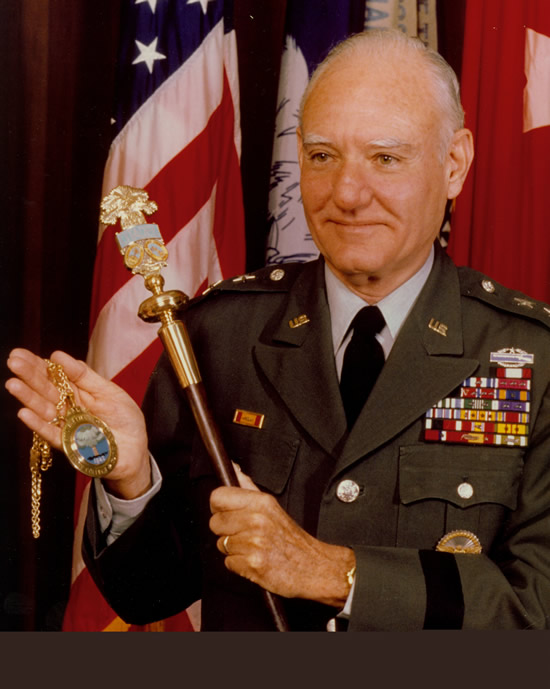
MG Grimsley, President of The Citadel

James Alexander Grimsley Jr. (November 14, 1921 – June 11, 2013), was a United States Army Major General and combat veteran of two wars who also served as President of his alma mater, The Citadel from 1980 to 1989.

== Life and career ==
Grimsley was born and raised in Florence, South Carolina. After graduating with The Citadel, class of 1942, he was commissioned as a Second Lieutenant in the US Army and immediately went to the Pacific Theater to fight in World War II. He held numerous high leadership positions including command of an infantry brigade in Vietnam, a tour as Assistant Commander of the 2d Armored Division and service on the Army General Staff. His career culminated with an assignment as a Deputy Assistant Secretary of Defense. After 33 years of service, Grimsley retired from the active duty in 1975.

Grimsley came to The Citadel in 1975 as vice president for Administration and Finance; he was named president in 1980 upon the resignation of his predecessor, Vice Admiral James B. Stockdale. His tenure at the Citadel was marked by a return to traditional values in the corps of cadets, a significant increase in applications, major physical improvements to the campus and rising academic rankings.

When Grimsley retired in 1989, he was named President Emeritus. This distinction had previously only been given to General Charles Summerall and General Mark Clark.

== Awards ==
During Grimsley's active duty career, he received 35 major decorations, including the following:

Combat Infantryman Badge (2 awards)
Distinguished Service Medal
Silver Star with oak leaf cluster
Legion of Merit with three oak leaf clusters
Bronze Star with three oak leaf clusters
Air Medal with award numeral 6
Joint Service Commendation Medal
Army Commendation Medal
Purple Heart with two oak leaf clusters
American Campaign Medal
Asiatic-Pacific Campaign Medal with arrowhead device and three service stars
World War II Victory Medal (United States)
Army of Occupation Medal
National Defense Service Medal with Service Star
Vietnam Service Medal
Philippine Liberation Medal
Vietnam Gallantry Cross with palm and bronze star
Vietnam Gallantry Cross Unit Citation
Vietnam Campaign Medal
