= Zucker Family School of Education =

- Established: 2002
- Parent institution: The Citadel
- Dean: Len Annetta
- Undergraduates: 314
- Postgraduates: 948
- Location: Charleston, South Carolina, U.S. 32.796320°N 79.958485°E
- Website: www.citadel.edu/root/education

The Zucker Family School of Education is one of the five schools comprising The Citadel in Charleston, South Carolina. The school offers bachelor's and master's degrees in several Education specialties. It was established in 2002 as The Citadel reorganized its existing departments into the five schools. The school is currently located in Capers Hall, but will move to Bond Hall after completion of a new building for the School of Business.

The degree programs from the school are offered jointly with other schools. Undergraduates can pursue a B.S. degree in Biology/Secondary Education with concentrations in Biology, Chemistry, and Social Studies Education, Physical Education (Teaching Track), as well as in Modern Languages (French, German, or Spanish). Graduate work include degree programs in four concentrations: Counselor Education, Educational Leadership, initial teaching licensure (MAT), Literacy Education, and STEM as well as two certificate programs.

On November 11, 2014, Anita Zucker announced a $4 million gift to The Citadel to expand and endow offerings in the School of Education. The Citadel announced that the school would henceforth be named for the Zucker family, the first of the five schools at the military college to be named for a major donor.

In cooperation with the School of Engineering and Swain Family School of Science and Mathematics, the school in 2009 established and supports The Citadel's STEM Center for Excellence, to prepare students for STEM careers through a variety of programs, including the "Storm the Citadel" Engineering week, summer camps, and scholarships. Programs are also offered jointly and in cooperation with the College of Charleston and other local colleges at the Lowcountry Graduate Center in North Charleston, South Carolina.

== See also ==
- Zucker Family Graduate Education Center
