= The Regimental Band and Pipes =

Marching ensemble at the Citadel military college, South Carolina, US

The Citadel Regimental Band and Pipes
- School: The Citadel
- Location: Charleston, South Carolina, US
- Conference: Southern Conference
- Founded: 1909
- Director: Lt. Col. Tim Smith SCM.
- Members: 111

The Regimental Band and Pipes is a marching band from the South Carolina Corps of Cadets of the senior military college The Citadel in Charleston, South Carolina. It was founded in 1909 with marine general Harry K. Pickett in command. In 1991, the band participated in the Edinburgh Military Tattoo, becoming the first military college selected for the honor. They returned in 2010 as the only unit from the United States to appear at the Silver Jubilee of the Tattoo and appeared again in 2015 and 2024.

== History ==
Members have marched during inaugural parades and national functions and played for the President of the United States on numerous occasions including marching in the Presidential Inauguration Parades of 1953 and 1961. In 1985, the Regimental Band and Pipes travelled to Washington for the Presidential Inauguration, but extreme cold weather cancelled the parade. In 1991, the Regimental Band and Pipes became the first military college band ever to be selected to participate in the Edinburgh Military Tattoo of Scotland.

== Regimental Band ==
The Regimental Band is composed of about 100 cadet musicians. An important part of cadet life at The Citadel, it contributes to the morale of the Corps and helps to maintain the martial atmosphere of the campus.

The band is an active organization that provides service to The Citadel in many capacities. It performs during the Friday afternoon dress parades, buglers control the daily schedule, and freshman and sophomore cadets from the band perform as the Corps marches to its noon meal during the week. The band is active at football games and inspires Citadel athletic teams and fans with its Pep Band throughout the year. Contributing to The Citadel's annual Christmas holiday celebrations, members form an ensemble that accompanies the many cadet choirs in the Christmas candlelight service. Numerous other events, ranging from holiday parades, formal ceremonies and special events, round out the yearly schedule.

The current director of the Regimental Band is Chief Warrant Officer 2 Stephen Giove USMC.

== The Citadel Pipe Band ==
The sounds of bagpipes were first heard at The Citadel in 1955. One of the most easily recognized attractions at the college, the Pipe Band is composed of a pipe major, drum major and approximately 30 to 35 pipers and drummers. Each fall, the unit recruits pipers from the freshman class, many of whom have never played the bagpipes.

The colorful unit, led by the kilted drum major in a feather bonnet, is the leading element of the Regimental Band and Pipes. From 1956 until 1981, the bagpipers wore the Royal Stewart tartan. Since 1981, the bagpipers have worn The Citadel's own tartan, which has been duly registered in Edinburgh, Scotland. The Pipe Band is popular at dress parades and other events throughout South Carolina and the nation, including the Heritage PGA Tour event at Hilton Head, SC. The Pipe Band is a very active organization that also competes as a Grade IV band at Highland Games all over the United States. Mentored by Sandy Jones, one of the nation's premier pipe instructors for more than 25 years, the Citadel Pipe Band is one of the nations finest.

The current director of the Pipe Band is Major Jim Dillahey SCM '01,

== The Edinburgh Military Tattoo 1991 ==
The Citadel Regimental Band and the Pipe Band were the only American unit invited for the 1991 show, having been invited by the Tattoo's producer, Colonel Leslie P.G. Dow, O.B.E., in March 1990. Both units performed as part of the massed bands and massed pipes. Their performance resulted in the South Carolina Legislature passing a concurrent resolution commending their performance.

== The Royal Edinburgh Military Tattoo 2010 ==
The Citadel Regimental Band and Pipes were selected by the Director of the Royal Edinburgh Military Tattoo to represent the United States at the 2010 Diamond Jubilee of the Royal Edinburgh Military Tattoo, a month-long nightly festival of music, pageantry and demonstrations by military organizations from around the world. The festival ran Aug. 6-28 and included nightly performances and concerts in and around Edinburgh.

== The Royal Nova Scotia International Tattoo 2013 ==
The Citadel Regimental Band and Pipes were the United States representative to the 2013 Royal Nova Scotia International Tattoo. The Tattoo, the world's largest annual indoor show, is presented annually the first week each July by the Royal Nova Scotia International Tattoo Society with support from the Government of Canada, the Province of Nova Scotia, the Canadian Forces, the Royal Canadian Mounted Police, the Halifax Regional Municipality and the Corporate Community. The Nova Scotia Tattoo was first held in 1979 to mark the visit of HM Queen Elizabeth The Queen Mother to Nova Scotia for the International Gathering of the Clans. It has been held every year since and was granted Royal Status by Her Majesty The Queen in 2006 on the occasion of her 80th Birthday.

== The Royal Edinburgh Military Tattoo 2015 ==
Selected for a third time to represent the United States at the 2015 Tattoo, the Regimental Band performed the opening fanfare for the Tattoo's theme, "East meets West", as well as the massed bands finale. Combined with the Citadel pipe band, their own seven-minute segment of the show featured musical numbers reflecting a wide variety of uniquely American music.

== The Royal Edinburgh Military Tattoo 2024 ==
The Citadel Regimental Band and Pipes attended the Royal Edinburgh Military Tattoo in August 2024 under the direction of LtCol Timothy Smith and Major Jim Dillahey. The Citadel was also the only American college band to attend the tattoo in this year and their set consisted of many original works composed by the directors. Other works include "Take Me Home (Country Roads)" by John Denver (1971) and "I'm Shipping up to Boston" by the Dropkick Murphys (2004).
