= Summerall Chapel =

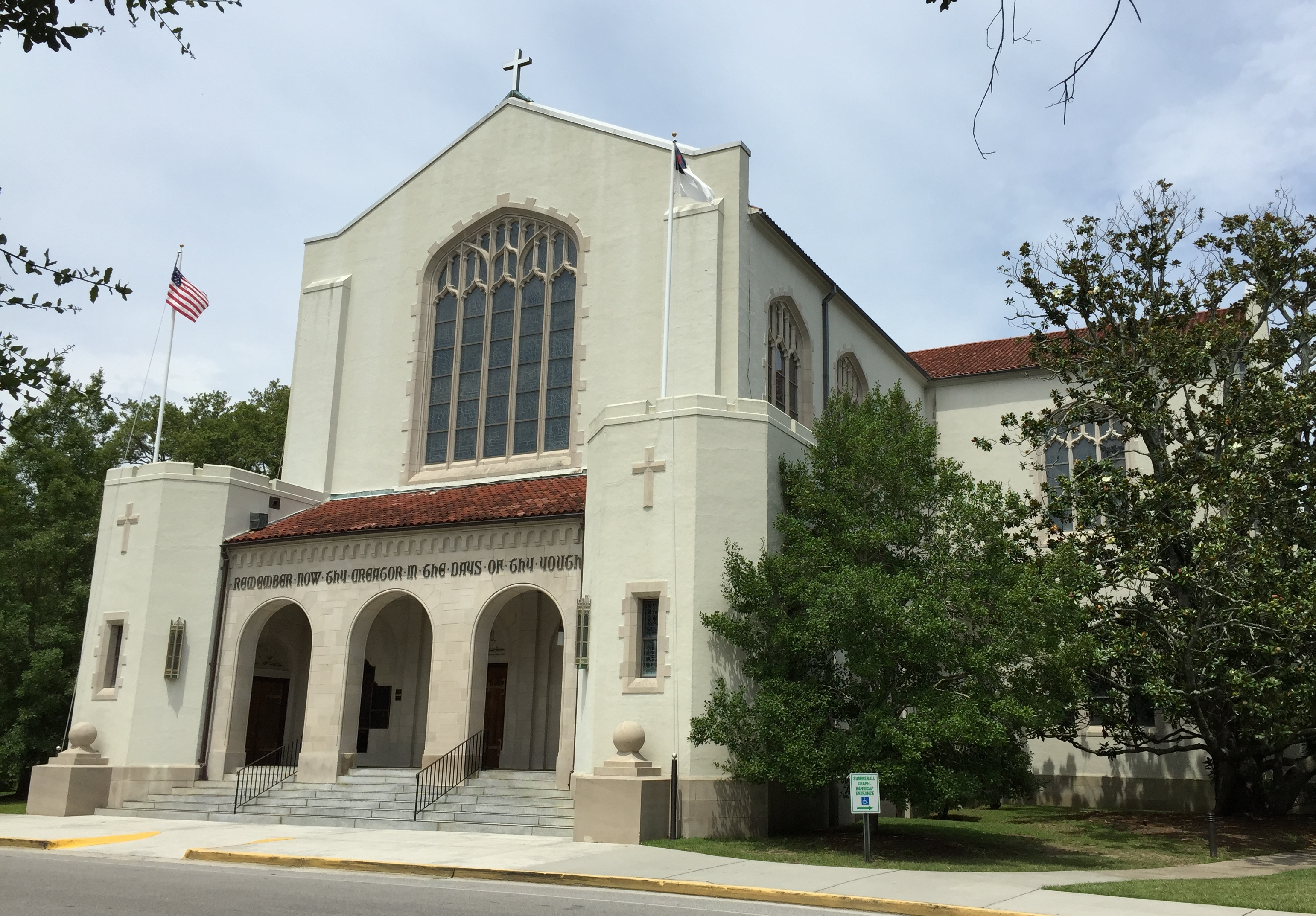
- Summerall Chapel
- 32.797790°N 79.959225°W
- Location: Charleston, South Carolina
- Country: United States
- Denomination: Non-denominational
- Website: www.citadel.edu/root/chapel

History
- Former name: Cadet Chapel (1936–1953)
- Status: Chapel

Architecture
- Functional status: Active
- Architect: C. R. MacDonald
- Style: Gothic
- Groundbreaking: September 7, 1936
- Completed: April 10, 1938

Summerall Chapel is a cruciform chapel on the campus of The Citadel in Charleston, South Carolina. Constructed from 1936 to 1938, the chapel serves the South Carolina Corps of Cadets and the broader Citadel and Charleston communities. The chapel is non-sectarian, but hosts Catholic, Protestant, and Episcopal worship services weekly during the academic year. Additionally, many special events, such as weddings and the annual Christmas Candlelight Service, are hosted in the chapel.

It is located on the Avenue of Remembrance, directly across Summerall Field from Padgett-Thomas Barracks. It stands between Daniel Library and Mark Clark Hall.

== Construction ==
The chapel, designed by C.R. MacDonald, was started on September 7, 1936 and dedicated on Palm Sunday, April 10, 1938. The first services, however, were held in the chapel on September 19, 1937. The chapel was named in honor of Citadel president Gen. Charles Pelot Summerall. A $1 million repair program was developed for the chapel in 1985.

== Decoration ==
Inside, there is a set of thirty stained glass windows designed by H.G. Wilbert depicting the life of Jesus Christ which were executed by the Pittsburgh Stained Glass Studios in the 13th century Gothic style.
