= Marion Square =

Green space in Charleston, South Carolina, United States

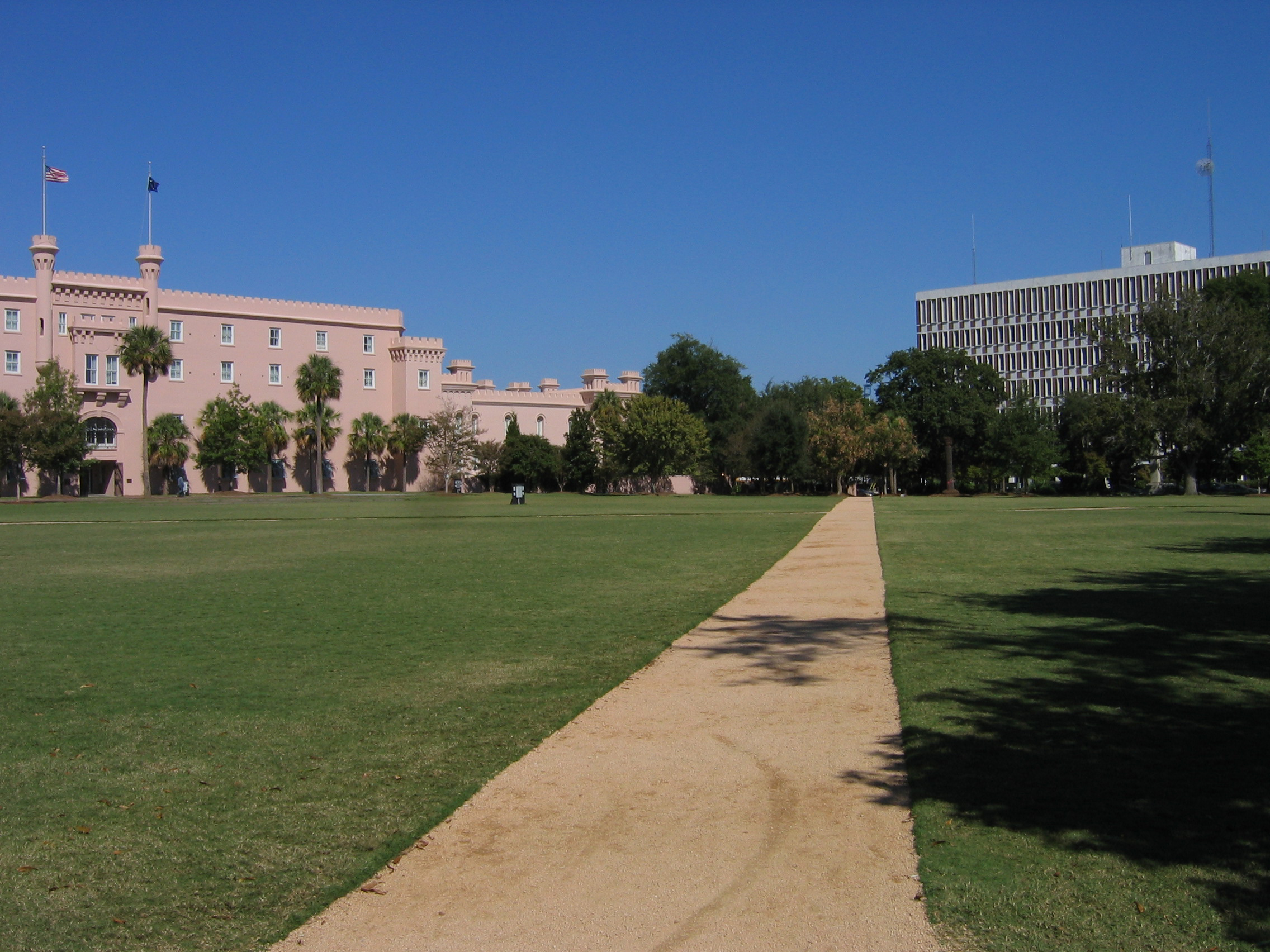
- Marion Square looking northeast, with the Old Citadel (left) and the L. Mendel Rivers Federal Building (right) in the background
- Interactive map of Marion Square
- Type: Urban park
- Location: Charleston, South Carolina, US
- Coordinates: 32°47′13″N 79°56′9″W
- Area: 10 acres (4.0 ha; 0.016 mi^{2}; 0.040 km^{2})
- Created: 10 October 1882
- Owner: Washington Light Infantry
- Operator: City of Charleston
- Open: Sunrise to Sunset

Marion Square is a small public park in downtown Charleston, South Carolina, United States. The ten-acre square (4.0 ha) was established as a parade ground for the state arsenal under construction on the square's north side. It is best known as the former Citadel Green because The Citadel occupied the arsenal from 1843 until 1922 when the Citadel moved to the city's west side. Marion Square was named in honor of Francis Marion.

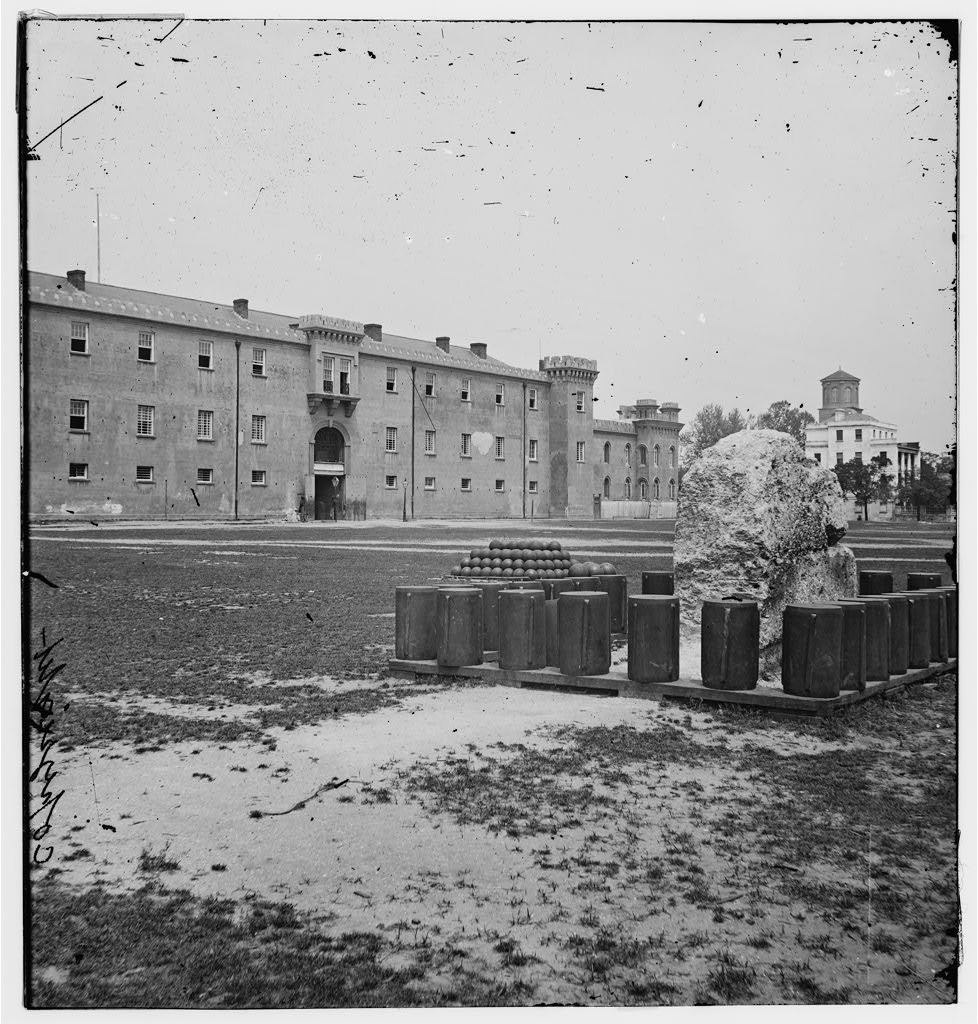
In this 1865 photo of the original Citadel building, a remnant of the city's defensive wall, known as a horn work, is visible in the foreground; the horn work is still in place in 2025 surrounded by a low iron fence.

The square is bounded by Calhoun (south), Meeting (east), Tobacco (a pedestrian-only right-of-way that lies between the square and properties to the north) and King (west) Streets. The land is what remains from a 10-acre (40,000 m^{2}) parcel conveyed to the colony of South Carolina in 1758. When Joseph Wragg died, his son, John Wragg, received 79 acres along King Street. In 1758, John Wragg sold 8.75 acres to the provincial government for 1,230 pounds to construct a defensive wall to keep the city safe from Indians and, later, the British. By 1783, there was no longer a need for the defence works, and the 8.75 acres were transferred to the newly created city government. In 1789, the state reacquired a portion of the land along the northern edge to build a tobacco inspection complex. When John Wragg's estate was being administered, an error was discovered; it seems that when the city acquired the 8.75 acres, an extra 1.40 acres was also taken over to compensate for the portion of the 8.75 acres which had become used as roads. A petition was submitted to the South Carolina Senate by John Wragg's heirs, and the matter was taken up by a Senate committee in December 1800. The state opted to pay the heirs for the 1.40 acres that had been mistakenly taken beyond the original 8.75 acres; returning the land was impractical since the tobacco complex had already been built by the time the error was discovered.

The square is jointly owned by the Washington Light Infantry and the Sumter Guards. Their objections prevented city officials from paving the park as a parking lot in the 1940s and in 1956 and also prevented its development as a shopping center. It is operated as a public park under a lease by the city of Charleston. Under the terms of the lease, the center of the square is kept open as a parade ground. Marion Square is situated directly across from Citadel Square Church and the South Carolina State Arsenal (Old Citadel).

The space is a favorite place for College of Charleston students because of its proximity to campus. In 2003, city council member Wendell Gaillard proposed banning sun-bathing in Marion Square ("This 'Girls-Gone-Wild'-type attitude has caught ahold all across the country. We don't want it to get to that point . . .," Gaillard said), but his proposal was met with little support; Gaillard claimed that exposing churchgoers and families to sunbathing was wrong and that sun-bathing students might attract stalkers to the area.

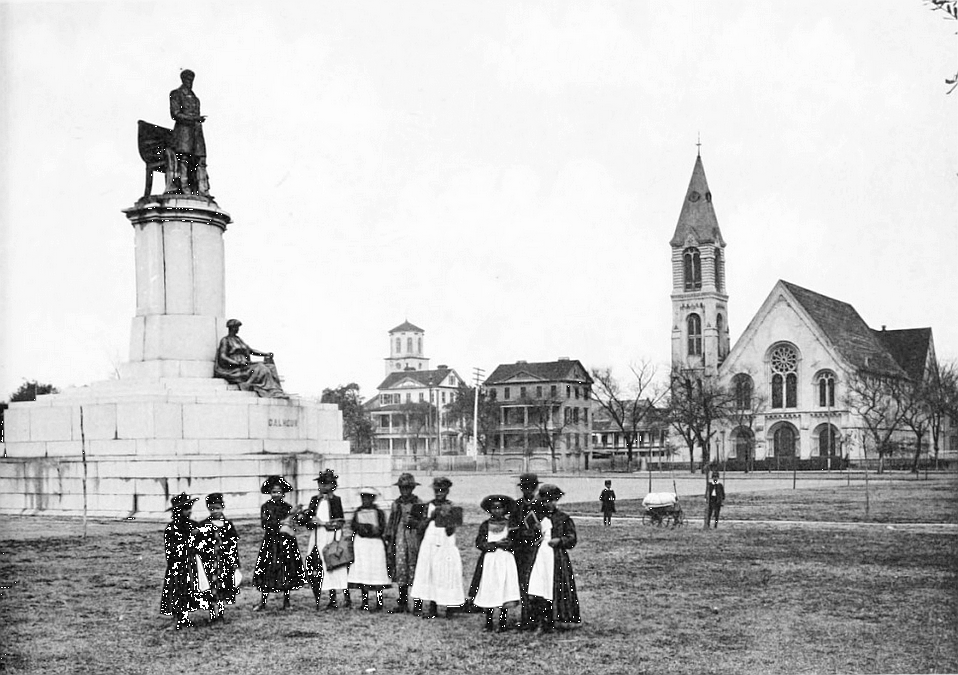
In this 1892 photograph of Marion Square, the original version of the Calhoun Memorial can be seen.

The square is the home to many monuments, including a Holocaust memorial and an obelisk dedicated to Wade Hampton. There had previously been a statue of John C. Calhoun in cast bronze atop a giant pillar on the square. It had been the second such structure in the square honoring Calhoun. The first one was not liked by the people of Charleston, and the organizers of the installation had problems with the delivery of the pieces. Eventually, in 1894, a new artist, J. Massey Rhind, was commissioned to create a new figure. A new memorial was raised in 1896, and the old one was sold off for scrap value. Concerns were raised regarding views of slavery. In June 2020, the statue of Calhoun was removed by City Council. In January 2021, a time capsule was found while completing the removal of the base of the statue. The time capsule dated to 1858 and was relocated under the monument during its construction later.

In 1944, a bandstand in the Art Moderne style was built according to plans by Augustus Constantine. The structure had originally been planned to house restroom facilities for white servicemen, but a bandstand component was added to the plans. The bandstand became a spot for political rallies, but the restrooms were a constant problem because of vandals. The bandstand was ultimately razed during refurbishing of the park that began in August 2000 and concluded in 2001. The bandstand had been in very poor shape since at least 1961 when city council approved its removal.

During the summer the square is also the home to a farmers market on Saturdays and various festivals such as the Food and Wine Festival and the Spoleto Arts Festival. Since 1913 a tree has been placed in Marion Square for the Christmas season.

== Gallery ==
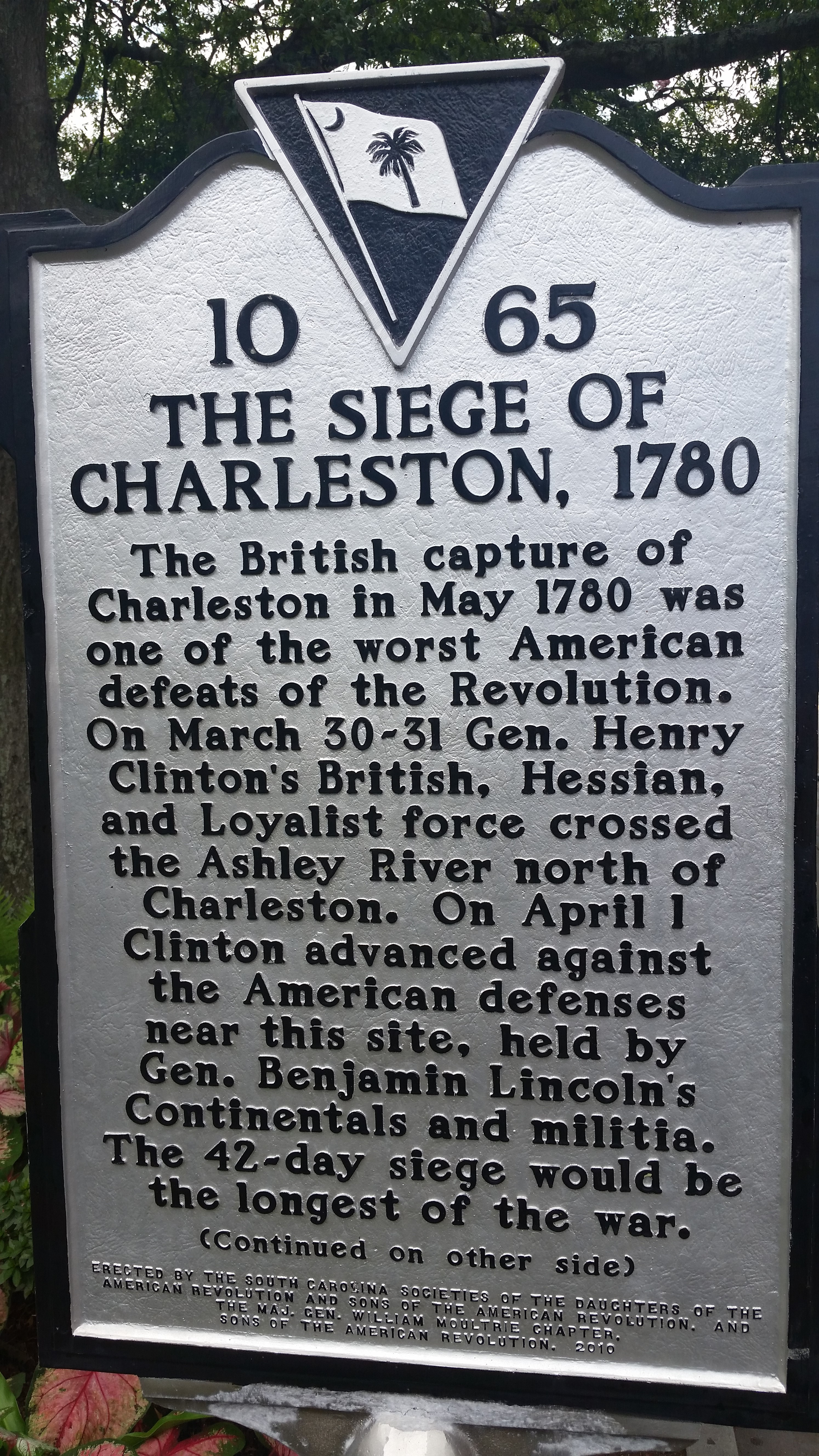
Marion Square historical marker for the Siege of Charleston. The center of the defensive works was called the hornwork, the inner wall consisting of a two foot thick wall constructed of lime and oyster shells. Two ditches were in front of the wall, and 93 cannon were mounted along the works.
