= South Carolina State Arsenal =

- U.S. National Register of Historic Places
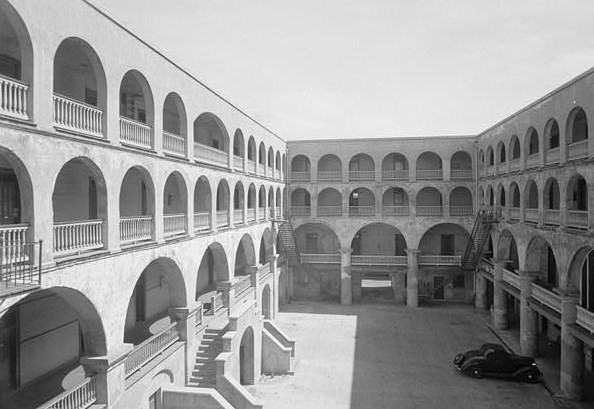

- Location within South Carolina Location within the United States
- Location: 337 Meeting St., Charleston, South Carolina
- Coordinates: 32°47′14″N 79°56′11″W
- Built: 1829
- Architect: Frederick Wesner and Edward B. White
- NRHP reference No.: 70000577
- Added to NRHP: July 16, 1970

The South Carolina State Arsenal ("The Old Citadel") in Charleston, South Carolina was built in 1829 in response to the alleged 1822 slave revolt led by Denmark Vesey. The alleged uprising never came to fruition and Vesey was publicly hanged in 1822. In 1842 the South Carolina Military Academy, a liberal arts military college, was established by the state legislature, and the school took over the arsenal the following year as one of 2 campuses, the other being the Arsenal Academy in Columbia, South Carolina. The school became known as the Citadel Academy because of the appearance of its building. From 1865 to 1881, during Reconstruction, Federal troops occupied the Citadel, and the school was closed. Classes resumed in 1882 and continued in this building until the school was relocated to a new campus on the banks of the Ashley River in 1922.

Frederick Wesner and Edward Brickell White are credited with the Citadel's design. The original State Arsenal building was a two-story brick building around a courtyard, designed by Wesner. White was responsible for changes to the building about 1850, and added the third floor and wings. A fourth floor was added in 1910.

The building was lightly damaged by the 1886 Charleston earthquake, but suffered more serious damage from an 1892 fire which is believed to have begun in a chimney that was cracked in the earlier tremor.

Charleston County used the building for government offices during much of the 20th century. In 1994 a local development firm renovated the building for use as a hotel.
