= HMS Janus (1778) =

Fifth-rate ship of the Royal Navy

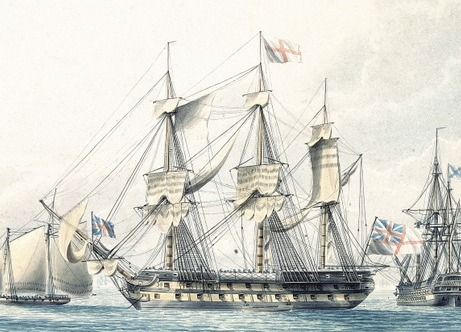
- Janus's sister ship HMS Argo

History

Great Britain
- Name: HMS Janus
- Namesake: Janus
- Ordered: 24 July 1776
- Builder: Robert Batson, Limehouse
- Laid down: 9 August 1776
- Launched: 14 May 1778
- Completed: 11 August 1778
- Renamed: Dromedary 3 March 1788
- Fate: Wrecked 10 August 1800

General characteristics
- Class & type: Roebuck-class fifth rate
- Tons burthen: 883 80/94 (bm)
- Length: 140 ft 1/2 in (42.7 m) (gundeck); 115 ft 10 in (35.3 m) (keel)
- Beam: 37 ft 10 1/2 in (11.5 m)
- Draught: 10 feet 4 inches (3.1 m) (forward); 14 feet 5 inches (4.4 m) (aft)
- Depth of hold: 16 ft 4 in (5.0 m)
- Sail plan: Full-rigged ship
- Complement: 300
- Armament: 1778; Lower deck: 20 × 18-pounder guns; Upper deck: 22 × 9-pounder guns; Forecastle: 2 × 6-pounder guns; 1788; Upper deck: 22 × 9-pounder guns; Quarterdeck: 8 × 6-pounder guns

HMS Janus was a 44-gun fifth-rate Roebuck-class ship of the Royal Navy. While participating in the American Revolutionary War, the ship joined the Jamaica Station in 1779. Employed patrolling the West Indies, Janus fought an action off the coast of Monte Cristi in March 1780 in which her squadron was chased away from a French convoy by its escorts. Horatio Nelson was given command of Janus in May, but never took the ship to sea as he was ill with malaria. Janus returned to Britain in September 1782; while the ship was undergoing a refit in March 1783 her crew mutinied over concerns they were not going to be paid off.

Janus was converted into a storeship and renamed Dromedary in 1788. With the French Revolutionary Wars underway, the ship returned to the West Indies and took part in the invasion of Martinique in February 1794. By 1797 the ship was stationed in the Mediterranean, where she became known for incompetence amongst her officers and crew, resulting in her captain being dismissed by a court-martial.

Dromedary was travelling from Grenada to Trinidad on 10 August 1800 with urgent reinforcements for the garrison there. Sailing through the Bocas del Dragón in the evening, the wind dropped away and the strong current pushed Dromedary onto the rocks off Huevos, wrecking her. The 500 crew and passengers on board all survived. After they had disembarked on to the rocks, the ship fell on to her side and broke in half. The crew was subsequently deemed not to be at fault for the loss of Dromedary.

== Design ==
Janus was a 44-gun, 18-pounder Roebuck-class ship. The class was a revival of the design used to construct the fifth-rate HMS Roebuck in 1769, by Sir Thomas Slade. The ships, while classified as fifth-rates, were not frigates because they carried two gun decks, of which a frigate would have only one. Roebuck was designed as such to provide the extra firepower a ship of two decks could bring to warfare but with a much lower draught and smaller profile. From 1751 to 1776 only two ships of this type were built for the Royal Navy because it was felt that they were anachronistic, with the lower (and more heavily armed) deck of guns being so low as to be unusable in anything but the calmest of waters. (Note: This problem was demonstrated in a sister ship of Janus, HMS Argo, which two French frigates captured in 1783 because the weather was so bad she was not able to open her lower gun ports during the battle.) In the 1750s the cruising role of the 44-gun two deck ship was taken over by new 32- and 36-gun frigates, leaving the type almost completely obsolete.

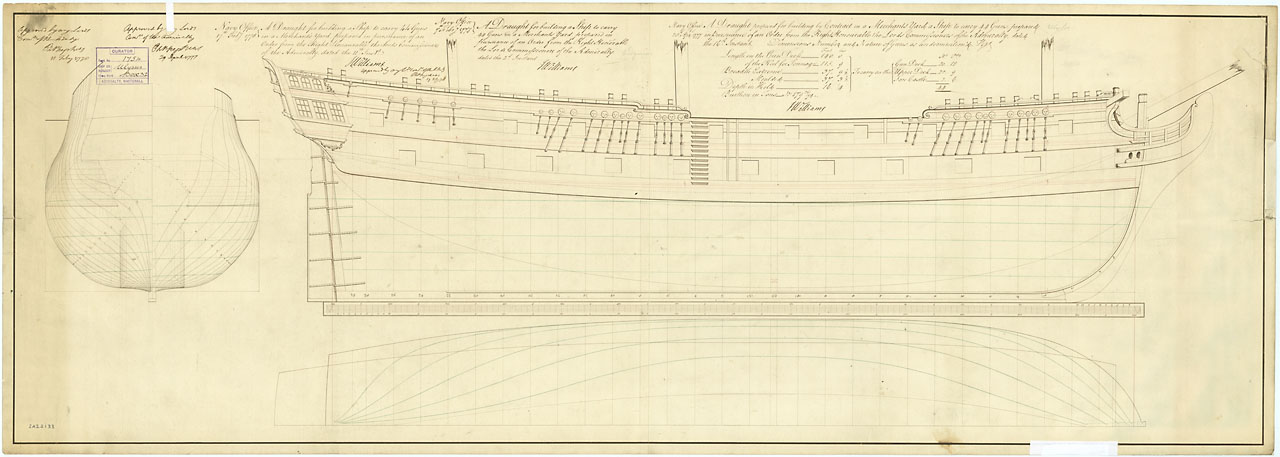
Plan of the Roebuck-class ships

When the American Revolutionary War began in 1775 a need was found for heavily armed ships that could fight in the shallow coastal waters of North America, where two-decked third-rates could not safely sail, and so the Roebuck class of nineteen ships, alongside the similar Adventure class, was ordered to the specifications of the original ships to fill this need. The frigate classes that had overtaken the 44-gun ship as the preferred design for cruisers were at this point still mostly armed with 9- and 12-pounder guns, and it was expected that the class's heavier 18-pounders would provide them with an advantage over these vessels. Frigates with larger armaments would go on to be built by the Royal Navy later on in the American Revolutionary War, but these ships were highly expensive and so Janus and her brethren continued to be built as a cheaper alternative.

== Construction ==
Janus, as the fourth ship built to the design, closely followed the parameters as originally set out for Roebuck in 1769 while later ships of the class differed from the design. While Janus and the other early ships of the class had two levels of stern windows, there was only ever one level of cabins behind them.

All but one ship of the class were contracted out to civilian dockyards for construction, and the contract for Janus was given to Robert Batson at Limehouse. The ship was ordered on 24 July 1776, laid down on 9 August the same year and launched on 14 May 1778 with the following dimensions: 140 feet 0 1/2 inch (42.7 m) along the gun deck, 115 feet 10 inches (35.3 m) at the keel, with a beam of 37 feet 10 1/2 inches (11.5 m) and a depth in the hold of 16 feet 4 inches (5 m). Her draught, which made the class so valued in the American Revolutionary War, was 10 feet 4 inches (3.1 m) forward and 14 feet 5 inches (4.4 m) aft. She measured 883 80/94 tons burthen. The fitting out process for Janus was completed on 11 August at Deptford Dockyard. Her construction and fitting out cost in total £18,096.

Janus received an armament of twenty 18-pounder long guns on her lower deck, with twenty-two 9-pounders on the upper deck. These were complemented by two 6-pounders on the forecastle; the quarterdeck was unarmed. The ship was to have a crew of 280 men, which was increased to 300 in 1783. She was named on 27 August 1776 after the mythological two-headed keeper of the portals of heaven, Janus.

== Service ==
=== Convoys & Jamaica ===
Janus was commissioned in June 1778 under the command of Captain Bonovier Glover, while completion was still underway. As this was coming to an end, on 23 August a small boat became entangled with Janus; it capsized, drowning two men. Janus's first task in commission was to escort a convoy of merchant ships to Denmark. They departed on 11 September and arrived at Helsingør on 18 September. The ship then made the return journey with another convoy, leaving on 27 September and reaching the Downs via Gothenburg on 2 October. The ship then joined a squadron of ships under Commodore Joshua Rowley, which sailed from Britain on 26 December as reinforcements for the Jamaica Station. Bad weather forced Janus to shelter at Torbay, eventually making sail for Jamaica on 2 January 1779.

Janus arrived at Jamaica on 22 March, and commenced a period of routine patrols around the island. Fears were rife that the French fleet would invade Jamaica, and in August Janus was allocated to a force guarding the capital Kingston. Along with three other ships she was placed in a line across the entrance to the harbour, stretching out from Fort Charles. If an attack was too great for them to defend, it was planned that they would retreat towards Fort Augusta where there were further defences. Later in the month the French fleet sailed away from the area and the invasion fears lessened, allowing the ships to leave their defensive positions. Janus resumed her patrols.

=== Action off Monte Cristi ===
From 10 October Janus began patrolling off the coast of Haiti in company with the 64-gun ship of the line HMS Lion and 50-gun fourth-rate HMS Bristol. Under the overall command of Captain William Cornwallis, after several months of uneventful service, reports came in that a French convoy would be arriving at Cap-Français from Martinique. By 15 March 1780 the three ships were operating close to Cap-Français, intending to intercept the convoy.

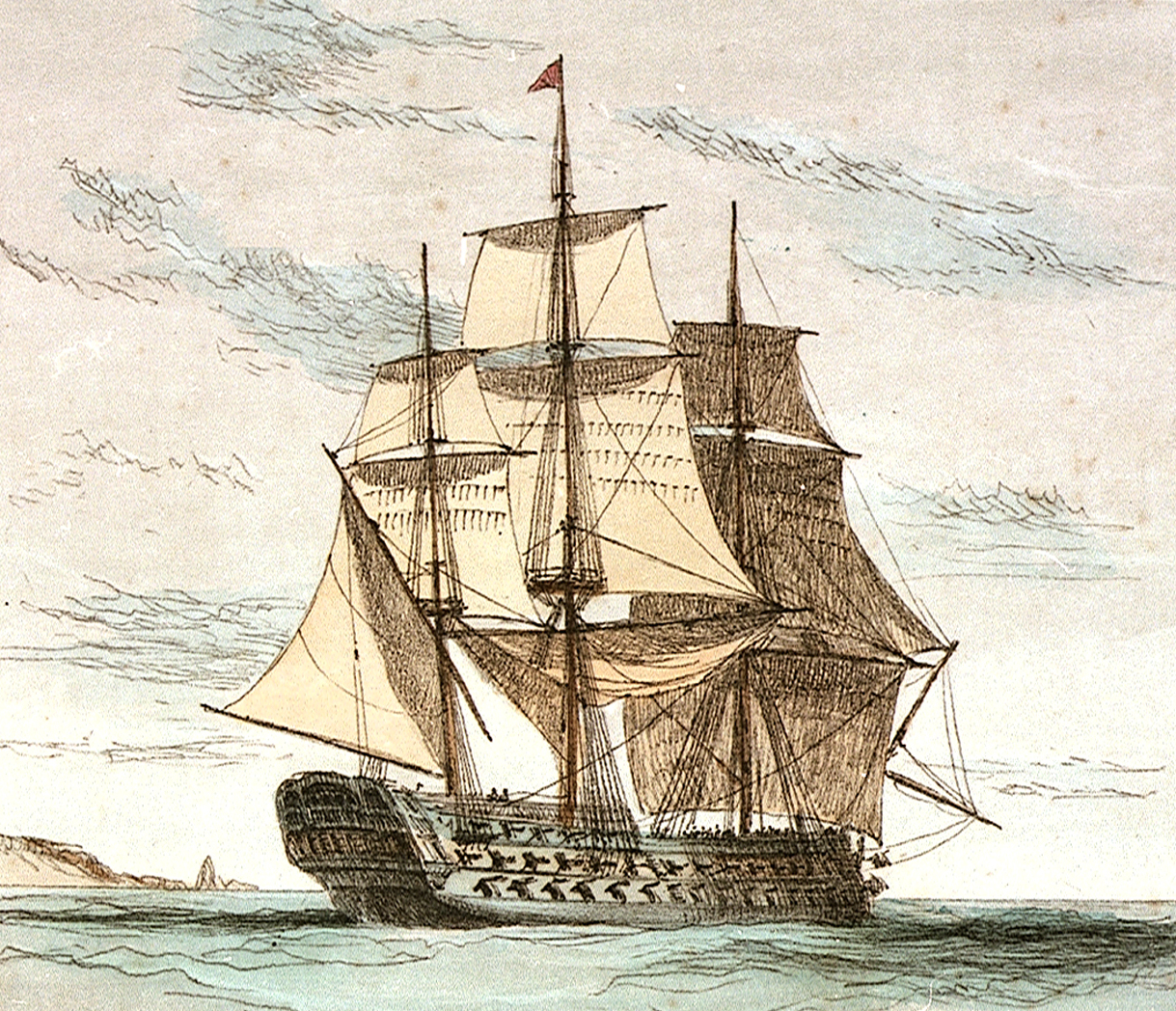
HMS Lion fought with Janus in the action

On 19 March the ships located the convoy off Monte Cristi as it made for Cap-Français. The merchant ships were escorted by a squadron under the command of Toussaint-Guillaume Picquet de la Motte, with three ships of the line, a fourth-rate, and a frigate. Picquet de la Motte ordered the merchant ships to sail for Cap-Français, while he headed off the three vessels.

With the British outnumbered, a chase began; at 5 p.m. Picquet de la Motte's flagship, the 74-gun ship of the line Annibal, began firing at the British ships ahead, and was able to continue this distant fire until about midnight, continuing when daylight returned. Janus received most of the fire from Annibal, having parts of her mizzen and foremast shot away. Through the night the wind lessened considerably, and Lion and Bristol began towing Janus with their small boats to keep her speed up. Glover died below decks, unable to leave his cot, of natural causes at about 3 a.m. Picquet de la Motte's other ships got into range during the day.

Annibal was ahead of the other vessels, and at one point on 21 March the three British ships almost surrounded her; Janus got behind the ship of the line and was able to fire into her stern, causing considerable damage, but Annibal took advantage of a breeze to get back to the cover of the other French ships. The chase continued into 22 March, and by 6:30 a.m. the French were about an hour away from overtaking the British. At this point however reinforcements came for the British, when the 64-gun ship of the line HMS Ruby, 28-gun frigate HMS Pomona, and 32-gun frigate HMS Niger came into sight. Picquet de la Motte ended his chase and sailed back to Cap-Français.

Apart from Glover, Janus had two men killed and three wounded in the engagement. Temporary command of the ship off Monte Cristi had gone to Lieutenant George Hopewell Stephens, the first lieutenant, (Note: The first lieutenant at this time is alternately named as John Clark.) and after the action Lion's first lieutenant, Lieutenant James Cornwallis, was sent across as acting captain. Stephens angered William Cornwallis when he reported Glover's death to him after the battle. The two captains had been friends; prior to the battle there had been some concern over Glover's abilities, and Cornwallis had wanted him to be at least carried from his cot to die on the quarterdeck. Janus returned to Jamaica on 24 March and went into the dockyard to have her battle damage repaired.

=== Nelson's captaincy ===
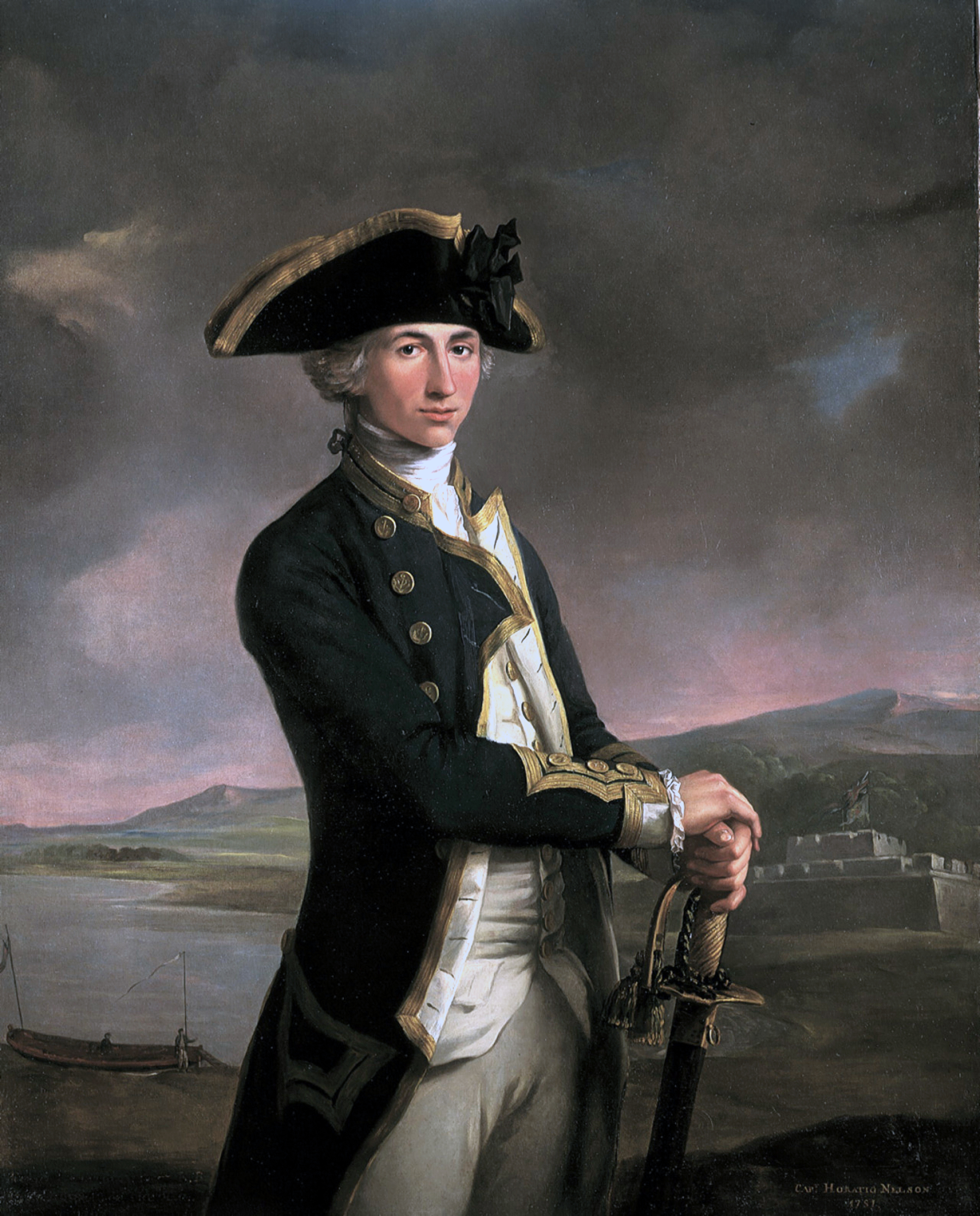
Illness prevented Horatio Nelson from taking Janus to sea during his period in command

Captain Horatio Nelson was appointed to the ship in May. Janus was at the time at Port Royal, Jamaica, having completed her repairs and now preparing for sea. Nelson, however, was suffering badly from malaria and arrived in the port on 17 May emaciated and having to be carried ashore. He was strong enough to visit Janus for the first time on 25 May, but did little more with the ship.

Janus stayed in harbour; in the space of three months at Port Royal forty-eight members of the crew used this opportunity to desert. Nelson, believing himself in recovery, took day-to-day command of Janus in June, but soon relapsed and was taken ashore for further treatment. Sent back to Britain at his own request, he was replaced temporarily by Lieutenant Manley Dixon on 15 August. Nelson never took Janus to sea. On 17 August Janus resumed her patrols at sea. At Rockfort on 20 September Captain William Henry King O'Hara took over command of Janus, but routine for the ship remained unchanged, with patrols through the West Indies. This continued until late August 1781 when the ship sailed as escort to a convoy headed for North America, reaching Sandy Hook on 8 October.

=== North America ===
Janus remained at New York until she sailed on 14 December 1781 with several other warships as escort to a convoy. The weather deteriorated, until on 17 December the ship's mainmast broke in half and she also lost part of her mizzenmast. Janus quickly lost sight of the convoy; with the pumps unable to contend with the amount of water entering the ship, the crew lightened ship by throwing the two forecastle guns overboard. By 18 December the weather had worsened, Janus was still taking in water and she had received more damage to her masts. Half of the crew were employed in working pumps. In order to further lighten the ship, the bow anchors were removed, and went over the side along with eighteen of the 9-pounders and twelve of the 18-pounders. These extreme actions proved successful, and the ship was able to return to a regular level of pumping. Janus continued on, with rigging being repaired and holes plugged as she sailed. She arrived at Antigua on 8 January 1782; the crew was exhausted, and sixty men were loaned from the 74-gun ship of the line HMS Royal Oak to get the ship safely in to harbour.

Repairs were undertaken at English Harbour, with Janus finally able to depart on 24 May. Having spent time patrolling and chasing smugglers off St Lucia, on 2 August the ship sailed as escort to a convoy headed to Britain. They arrived at Portsmouth on 30 September. Janus received a refit at Portsmouth Dockyard between October and December. A further refit began at Portsmouth in March 1783.

=== Portsmouth mutiny ===
The crew of Janus expected to be paid off now that they had returned to Britain, but they were instead kept with the ship to prepare her for the dockyard and then to go back to sea. Infuriated, the crew mutinied, barricading the ship's officers and refusing orders. O'Hara was on shore at the time, and when he initially attempted to board Janus the crew armed themselves and refused him entry. He eventually managed to board, and spoke to the crew. He confirmed that Janus was preparing for another commission. The men shouted back to him, saying "That's enough! We'll listen no more!". They went to Janus's guns and threatened to fire at any vessel which passed them.

Admiral Lord Howe came to Portsmouth to entreat with the mutineers. He came on board Janus alone, and announced to the crew that he had reversed the decision to keep Janus in commission, and that she would be paid off before any further service. The crew cheered him, and ended the mutiny. There were no punishments as a result of the crew's actions; Howe believed that fault lay with Janus's captains, who had not allowed the crew enough shore leave. In the following month Janus was recommissioned by Captain Robert M'Evoy. Work on the ship continued until July, after which Janus was anchored in Spithead. Having remained in Britain, on 27 September M'Evoy was replaced in Janus by Captain John Pakenham.

Janus then sailed to the West Indies as escort to a convoy, leaving on 6 December. Travelling via Madeira and Tenerife, she arrived at Jamaica on 18 January 1784. With the American Revolutionary War having come to an end, Pakenham subsequently returned Janus to Britain; she was paid off in October 1786.

=== Storeship ===
With the wartime necessity of using the obsolete ships as frontline warships now at an end, most ships of Janus's type were taken out of service. While lacking modern fighting capabilities, the design still provided a fast ship, and so the Comptroller of the Navy, Sir Charles Middleton, pressed them into service as troop and storeships. Janus was assigned the latter role.

On 19 December 1787 Janus was re-rated as a 24-gun vessel; her lower deck and forecastle armaments were removed, but the twenty-two 9-pounders on the upper deck were left untouched, and eight 6-pounder long guns were added to the previously unarmed quarterdeck. Work to adapt the vessel began at Deptford in February 1788 and while this was underway Janus was renamed Dromedary on 3 March. She was the second Royal Navy vessel to bear the name, which was traditionally used for troopships. Completed in November 1789, Dromedary was fitted out for service between September 1790 and January 1791, and was commissioned by Commander Benjamin Hulke.

=== Invasion of Martinique ===
A scene from the invasion of Martinique, in which Dromedary took part

Dromedary was paid off in September 1791 and was next recommissioned in March 1793, now under Commander Sandford Tatham. With the French Revolutionary Wars underway, on 26 November the ship sailed for the West Indies. There she formed part of the West Indies campaign, working to capture French-controlled islands. In 1794 Dromedary was used as a troopship for the invasion of Martinique. One of ten ships in a force commanded by Captain Josias Rogers, they conveyed a brigade of 1,200 men. In the morning of 8 February they attempted to land the soldiers at Case de Navire, a point 5 miles (8.0 km) north of the French capital Fort-de-la-République.

The French hotly contested the landing, controlling the heights surrounding the landing point and the coastal road running along them. The troops went ashore in small boats, but were attacked by artillery and musketry. While this was going on Dromedary sailed in close to the shore and came in range of one of the coastal gun batteries; she was hit in the hull by two cannonballs, killing one man and injuring several others including Tatham. The landing at Case de Navire was aborted, and the force moved 2 miles (3.2 km) further north to Case Pilote, where the ships successfully landed their soldiers as the French batteries there did not have enough ammunition to make a defence as had been done at Case de Navire. Martinique surrendered in late March; during the campaign Dromedary had two men killed and two wounded.

=== Mediterranean ===
In the following year Tatham was replaced by Commander Richard Hill, and in March 1795 Dromedary made another voyage to the West Indies. She returned to Britain in August. Commander Thomas Harrison assumed command of the ship in November, sailing Dromedary to the Mediterranean Sea on 9 February 1796. By December the ship was based at Portoferraio. The senior officer there was the ship's old commander, Nelson, whose most frequent interactions with Dromedary now were through courts-martial. Described by the historian John Sugden as "a 'rotten' ship rife with insubordination, incompetence, and corruption", the officers were as, if not more, problematic than the crew. On 28 December the first court-martial for Dromedary was that of her captain, Harrison.

Accused of keeping the stores on board Dromedary in poor condition and often ignoring requests for them to be distributed, Harrison was described as a drunk who frequently had to crawl into his cot. In his defence he said that he had rheumatism and pains in his head and eyes. Nelson dismissed Harrison from his command. On 3 January 1797 another court-martial saw Dromedary's master George Casey accused by another of the ship's officers, Lieutenant Nicholas Meager, of refusing to extinguish a light in his cabin on the grounds that Meager was keeping one lit in his, resulting in a struggle at Casey's door as he physically stopped Meager from entering.

Casey was dismissed from the Royal Navy. In retaliation he produced a counter-accusation that in June 1796 a confrontation on Dromedary's quarterdeck had resulted in Meager spitting in the face of Casey's wife, and then strongly pulling on Casey's nose. The court-martial for Meager deemed that the story was predominantly vindictive, and he was released with a reprimand. In need of a temporary captain after Harrison's fall from grace, Commander Bartholomew James was appointed to Dromedary. Soon after this he discovered a scheme on board wherein the ship's boatswain and a midshipman were stealing pitch, tar, and rope and sending it across to a different storeship, HMS Zephyr. They were both convicted of embezzlement.

The Royal Navy left Portoferraio that same January 1797. Returning via Gibraltar, Dromedary was escorted alongside another storeship by the 32-gun frigate HMS Southampton. By February Dromedary was at Lisbon, her absence from the Mediterranean Fleet meaning she missed the Battle of Cape St. Vincent on 14 February. Command of the ship transferred to Commander William Collis in June, and then in November to Commander Thomas Leef. He sailed the ship once again to Jamaica in January 1798.

== Loss ==
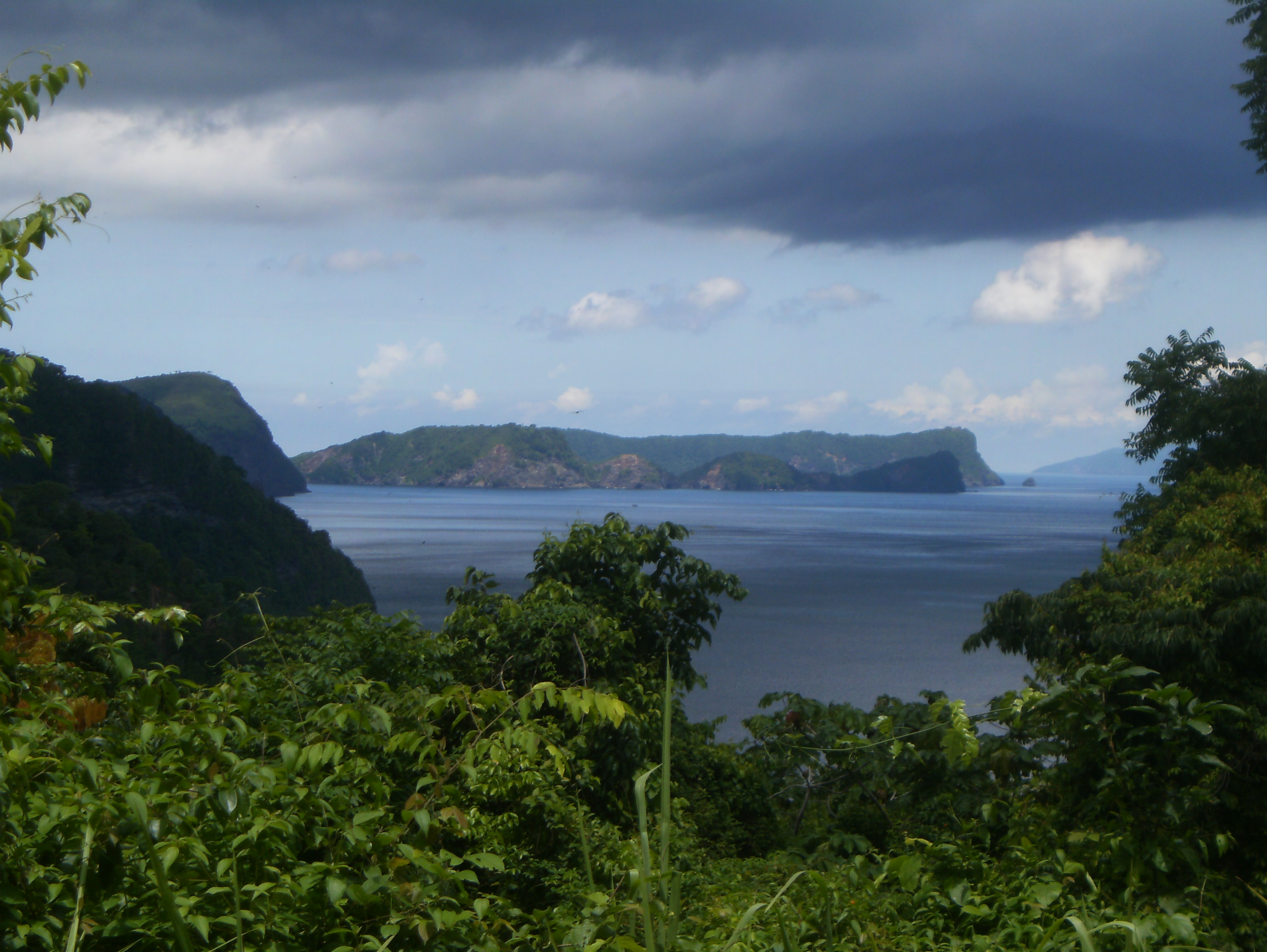
Dromedary was wrecked off Huevos, pictured here from Chaguaramas

Commander William Robinson assumed command of Dromedary in April 1799, and he was replaced by Commander Bridges Watkinson Taylor in November. In August 1800 it was thought that Trinidad might be imminently invaded by the French, and Dromedary was tasked with reinforcing the island with part of the 2nd West India Regiment. Embarking the troops at Grenada on 9 August, the ship arrived at Trinidad in the early hours of 10 August. The weather was very poor, with Dromedary contending with a strong current and inconsistent winds. The need to reinforce the island was urgent, however, and Taylor forged ahead through the Bocas del Dragón strait.

As Dromedary sailed ahead, at 10 p.m. the wind dropped away, leaving the ship unable to manoeuvre. The current pushed the ship up on the reef that surrounds the strait, and the rocks quickly destroyed the ship's rudder. At the mercy of the current, Dromedary was pushed on to the Parasol Rocks, off Huevos island. Stranded, the crew cut away the ship's foremast, using it and other parts of the masts to bridge on to the rocks from the bowsprit. This allowed the 500 crew and passengers to climb down on to the rocks. They spent fifteen hours awaiting rescue, during which time Dromedary fell on her side and broke in half. Boats from Port of Spain undertook the evacuation, avoiding the rocks by using the wreck of Dromedary as a pier. There were no casualties in the wreck.

In the subsequent court-martial into the loss of Dromedary it was determined that the crew were not at fault. The ship's master had, however, been found to be intoxicated even before the wreck and because he had therefore been unable to assist the crew after Dromedary had grounded, he was dismissed from the Royal Navy.
