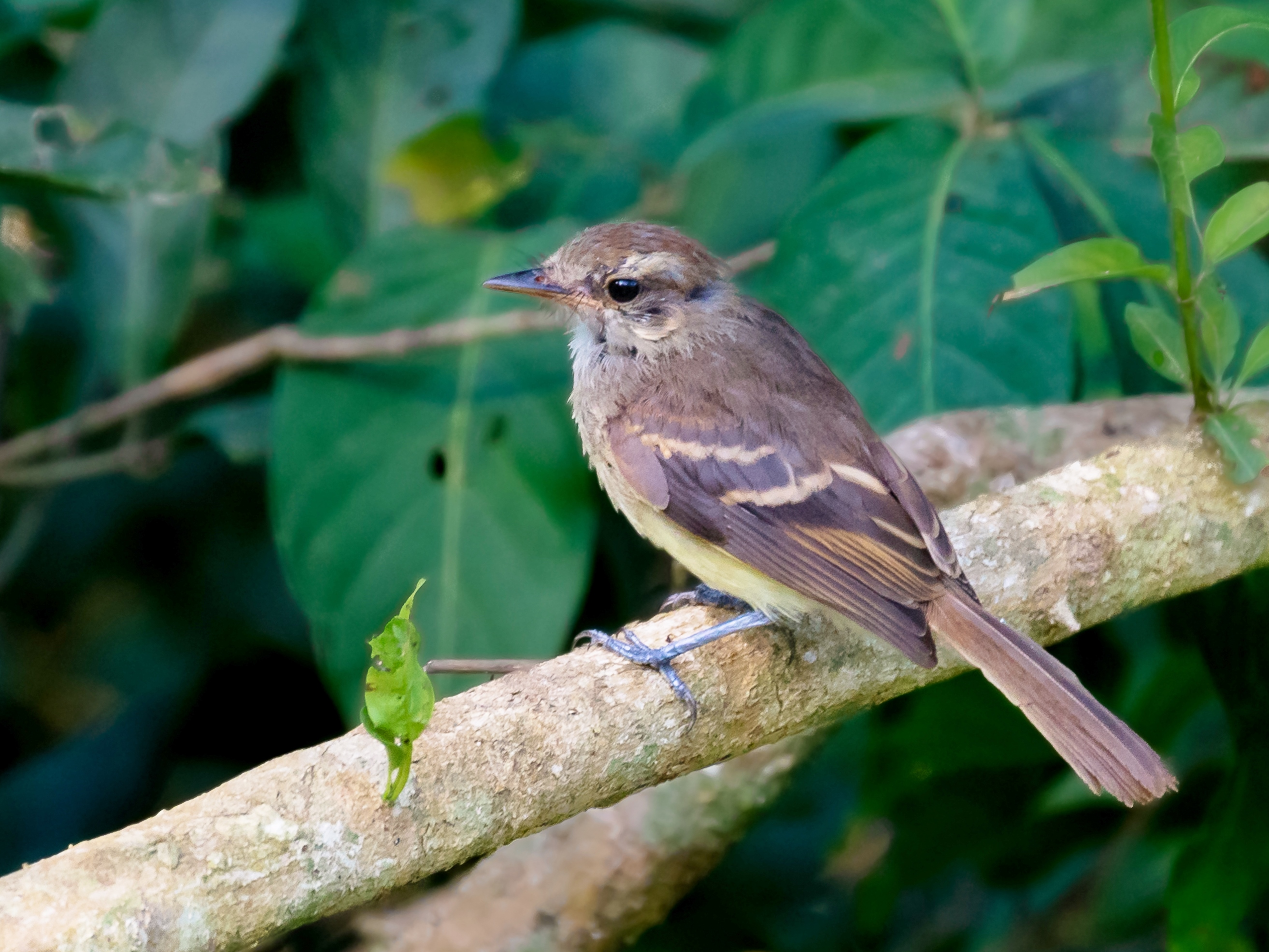

Conservation status
- Least Concern (IUCN 3.1)

Scientific classification
- Kingdom: Animalia
- Phylum: Chordata
- Class: Aves
- Order: Passeriformes
- Family: Tyrannidae
- Genus: Cnemotriccus; Hellmayr, 1927
- Species: C. fuscatus

Binomial name
- Cnemotriccus fuscatus (Wied, 1831)

= Fuscous flycatcher =

Species of bird

The fuscous flycatcher (Cnemotriccus fuscatus) is a small passerine bird in the family Tyrannidae, the tyrant flycatchers. It is found in Trinidad and Tobago and in every mainland South American country except Chile.

== Taxonomy and systematics ==
The fuscous flycatcher was originally described as Muscipeta fuscata. It was later transferred to genus Empidochanes and still later to its current genus Cnemotriccus, where it was originally called the dusky flycatcher.

The fuscous flycatcher has these seven subspecies:

- C. f. cabanisi (Léotaud, 1866)
- C. f. duidae Zimmer, JT, 1938
- C. f. fumosus (Berlepsch, 1908)
- C. f. fuscatior (Chapman, 1926)
- C. f. beniensis Gyldenstolpe, 1941
- C. f. bimaculatus (d'Orbigny & Lafresnaye, 1837)
- C. f. fuscatus (Wied, 1831)

The fuscous flycatcher is the only member of genus Cnemotriccus. However, several authors have suggested that both C. f. duidae and C. f. bimaculatus should be treated as separate species. In addition, vocal and habitat differences have been noted between C. f. fuscatior and C. f. duidae where they occur near each other. "Clearly, two or more species are currently included within currently defined Cnemotriccus fuscatus, but formal recognition awaits a detailed study that treats all taxa in the complex." Within the species, the Clements taxonomy separates C. f. duidae from the other subspecies as the "Fuscous Flycatcher (Campina)".

== Description ==
The fuscous flycatcher is 13.5 to 15 cm (5.3 to 5.9 in) long and weighs about 12 g (0.42 oz). The sexes have the same plumage. Adult males of the nominate subspecies C. f. fuscatus have a brown crown with a slight rufescent tinge. They have dusky lores, a whitish line above the lores that continues as a supercilium, and a dusky stripe through the eye. Their upperparts are brown with a slight rufescent tinge. Their wings are dusky with wide buffy ends on the coverts that show as two wing bars. Their inner secondaries have thin buff edges and their tertials have whitish edges. Their tail is long and dusky with brown edges on the feathers. Their throat is whitish, their breast olive-gray to grayish brown, and their belly pale yellow. They have a blackish iris, a long thin black bill with a dull pinkish base to the mandible, and black legs and feet.

The other subspecies of the fuscous flycatcher differ from the nominate and each other thus:

- C. f. duidae: dark brown crown and back, rich olive-brown breast, pale yellow belly, and entirely pale yellow-orange mandible.
- C. f. fuscatior: similar to duidae with dark brown crown and back but less rich olive-brown breast, a somewhat yellower belly, and a completely dark bill
- C. f. bimaculatus: like nominate except for dull brownish gray breast and white belly and completely black bill
- C. f. beniensis: similar to bimaculatus
- C. f. cabanisi: two color morphs; one with grayish upperparts and white belly, the other with brown upperparts and yellow belly
- C. f. fumosus: intermediate between the brown/yellow morph of cabanisi and duidae

== Distribution and habitat ==
The subspecies of the fuscous flycatcher are found thus:

- C. f. cabanisi: from northern and eastern Colombia into northwestern and northern Venezuela north of the Orinoco River; Trinidad, Tobago, and Monos and Chacachacare Islands
- C. f. duidae: central and southern Amazonas state in southern Venezuela and adjoining upper Negro River basin in northwestern Brazil
- C. f. fumosus: the Guianas and Brazil north of the Amazon from the Branco River east to the Atlantic
- C. f. fuscatior: from western Apure in western Venezuela south through southeastern Colombia, eastern Ecuador, eastern Peru and east from them in Brazil south of the Amazon to the Tocantins River In Ecuador known mostly along the Napo River
- C. f. beniensis: Pando and Beni departments in northern Bolivia
- C. f. bimaculatus: southeastern Peru, central and eastern Bolivia, southern and eastern Brazil, Paraguay, and northern Argentina from Jujuy to Corrientes provinces
- C. f. fuscatus: southeastern Brazil between Bahia and Rio Grande do Sul and into northeastern Argentina's Misiones Province

In addition, the South American Classification Committee of the American Ornithological Society has documented records in Uruguay.

The fuscous flycatcher inhabits a variety of landscapes; in all of them it favors thick shady undergrowth. Subspecies C. f. fuscatior is found in humid forest and woodlands both primary and secondary, especially along watercourses in terrain such as várzea, and on river islands. C. f. duidae is mostly restricted to forest on sandy and other nutrient-poor soils. C. f. cabanisi is often found in drier woodlands and in gallery forest in more open country. In Brazil the species is mostly found from sea level to 500 m (1,600 ft) but locally higher. In Venezuela it is found as high as 1,350 m (4,400 ft) but mostly below 500 m (1,600 ft) north of the Orinoco and only to about 250 m (800 ft) south of it. It reaches 1,000 m (3,300 ft) in Colombia, 400 m (1,300 ft) in Ecuador, 500 m (1,600 ft) in Peru, and 2,400 m (7,900 ft) in Bolivia.

== Behavior ==
=== Movement ===
The fuscous flycatcher is mostly a year-round resident. The populations in southern Brazil, northern Argentina, and Paraguay are believed to be migratory but details are lacking.

=== Feeding ===
The fuscous flycatcher feeds on insects. It typically forages singly or in pairs and rarely joins mixed-species feeding flocks. It perches somewhat horizontally, mostly in dense vegetation, and typically up to about 3 m (10 ft) above the ground. It captures prey with sallies from the perch to snatch or hover-glean it from foliage or the ground after a short flight.

=== Breeding ===
The fuscous flycatcher's breeding season has not been fully defined. It spans from February to July in Trinidad and Tobago and includes November in Argentina and Brazil. Its one known nest was found on Trinidad. It was an open cup made from bark and twigs and lined with black fibers, placed in a branch fork about 3 m (10 ft) above the ground. Nothing else is known about the species' breeding biology.

=== Vocalization ===
The fuscous flycatcher's vocalizations vary greatly among the subspecies. In Venezuela subspecies C. f. fuscatior sings "a low-pitched, slightly buzzy jaw-jew-jew-jew jew [and] at dawn a shorter rolling pü-breeer-breeer"; its call is "a short, abrupt feétz-beeu". The song and call are similarly described from Ecuador and Peru. C. f. cabanisi gives "a strong, reedy pfEEO! and pfeeu-pfeeu-pfeea". Subspecies C. f. duidae's dawn song is a "clear whistled chjueeeeeeEEEEchueeET!...or chjueeEEE! [and a] softer chuEEEEchee". In much of Brazil the species' call is "a muffled aag-aag-aag or frog-like bsh-bsh-bsh". In the Andes it makes a "series of excited p-pit-pit-péédi phrases".

== Status ==
The IUCN has assessed the fuscous flycatcher as being of Least Concern. It has an extremely large range; its population size is not known and is believed to be decreasing. No immediate threats have been identified. It is considered "uncommon to fairly common" in Venezuela, "locally fairly common" in Colombia, "not uncommon" in Ecuador, and "rare to uncommon" in Peru. It "[a]ccepts a variety of wooded habitats, and therefore occurs in many national parks and other protected areas throughout its extensive range".
