= Soldado Rock =

Island in Trinidad and Tobago

- Location within Trinidad and Tobago

Geography
- Coordinates: 10°04′38″N 62°00′54″W
- Total islands: 1

Administration
- Trinidad and Tobago

Demographics
- Population: Uninhabited (2015)

Soldado Rock or Soldier's Rock, formerly known as Soldado Island, is a small island in the Republic of Trinidad and Tobago. It is located in the Gulf of Paria 10 km off Icacos Point in Trinidad and north of the Venezuelan mainland. The island was originally a possession of the Venezuelan government, but became part of the territory of Trinidad and Tobago in 1942. The island is a wildlife sanctuary since being declared in 1934.

== Characteristics ==
Soldado Rock is made up of limestone fossils from the Paleocene age and includes Eocene rock formations. The highest elevation point is 35 meters (115 ft) and its area is 1 ha (10,000 m^{2}). Reefs surround the island to the east for 1.2 km (0.75 miles), and to the south-south east and south-east. There are no trees on the island but different types of vegetation including plumbago and portulaca. There are other small rock formations near the island, including Pelican Rock and Black Rock.

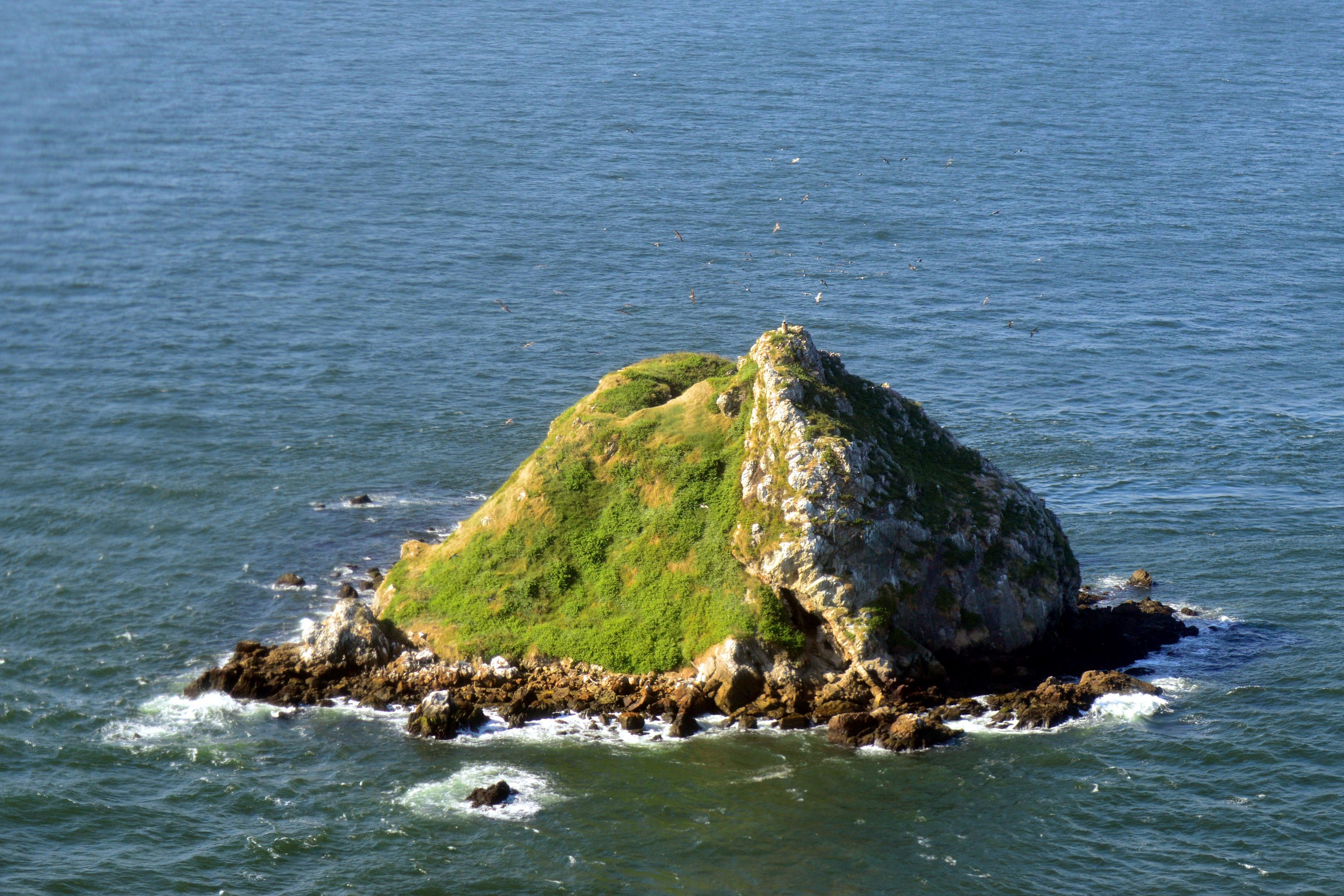
Aerial approach to Soldado Rock

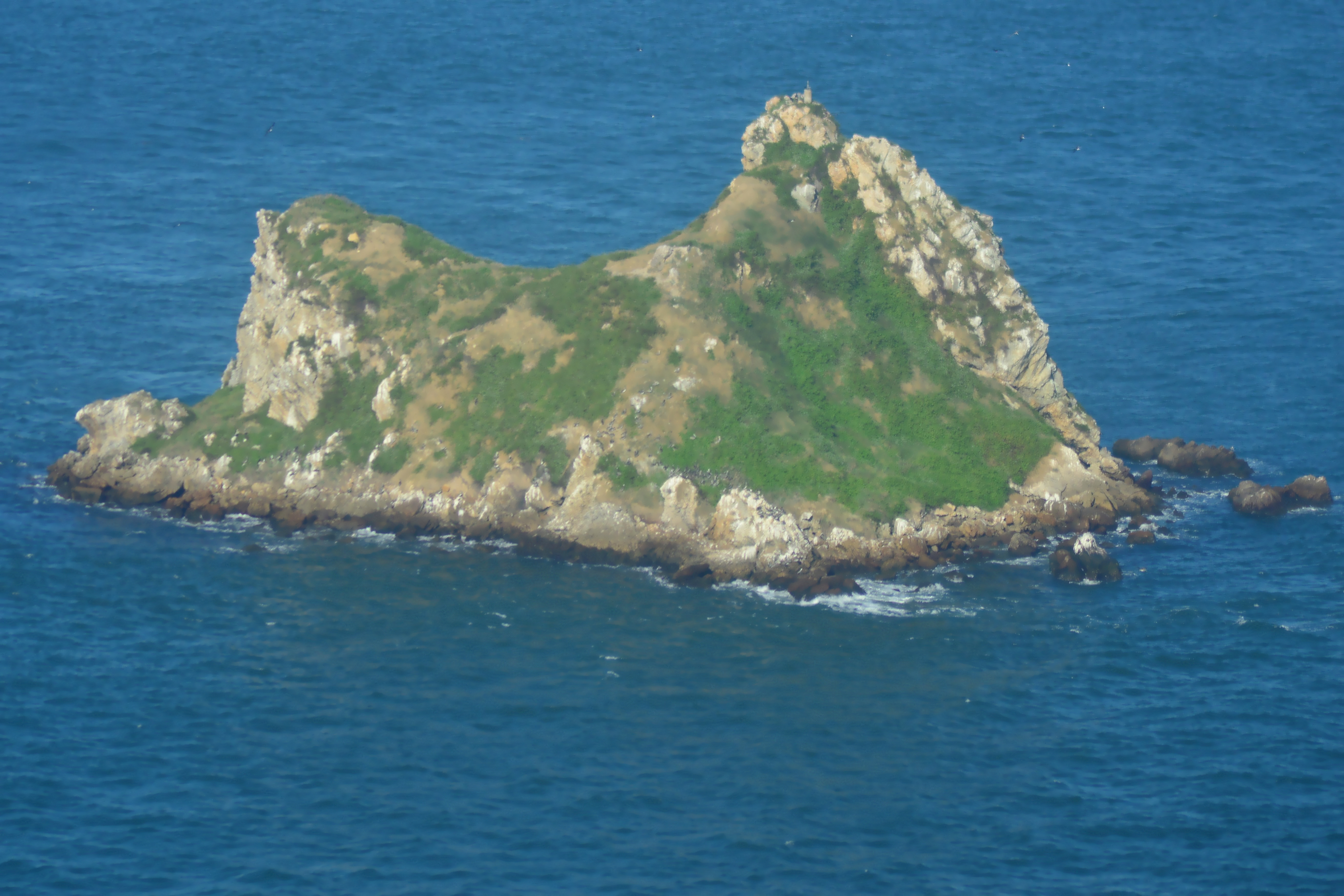
These images were taken during an aerial survey of Soldado Rock, territory of Trinidad and Tobago

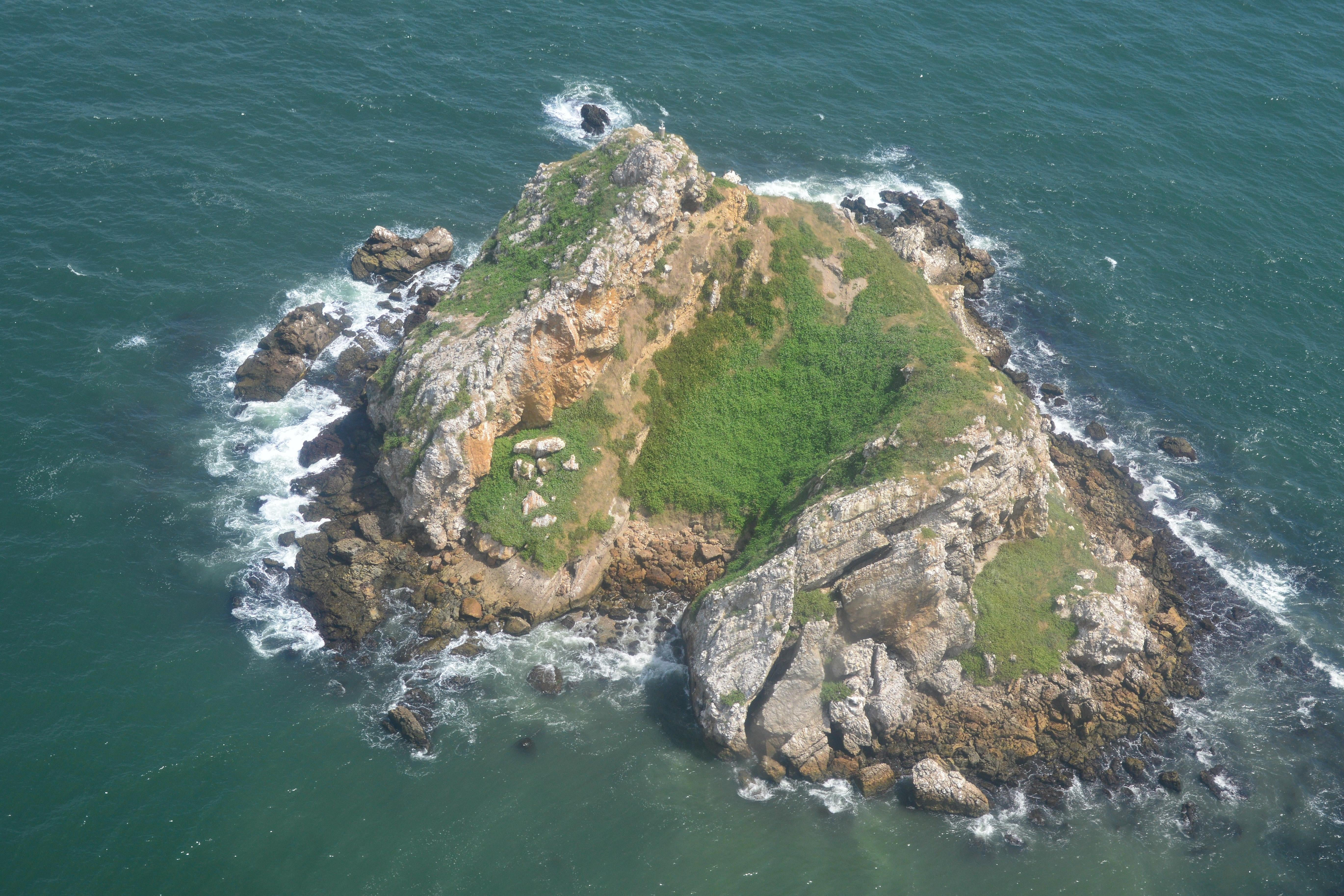
Pilot had to turn the aircraft directly above the rock because of very strict and close airspace restrictions by the Venezuelan authorities

== History ==
=== Early history ===
On August 2, 1498, Christopher Columbus sailed near the island during his Third Voyage in the Serpent's Mouth and named the island El Gallo (Spanish for "The Cock"). Columbus anchored near the island and encountered native Amerindians in canoes prior to landing on Trinidad for the first time. Its current name is derived from the Spanish word for "soldier". It was named in the 17th century after a Spanish boat shipwrecked near the island when a number of soldiers and sailors on board were rescued from the island. In the 19th century, it was also referred to as Île du Soldat (French) as charted by Dauxion Lavaysse in 1813.

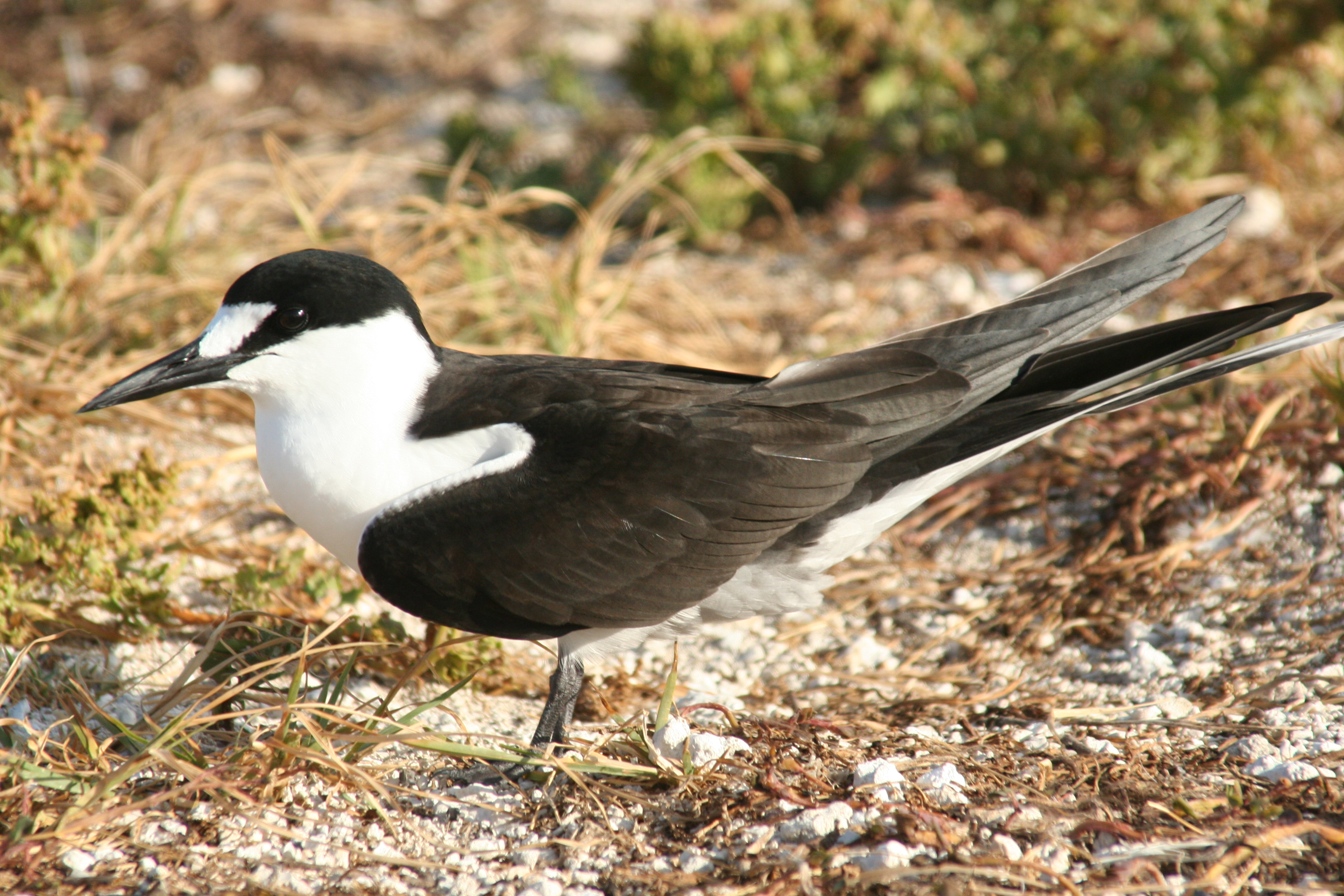
Sooty tern (pictured here in the French Frigate Shoals) is one of the species of birds that nest on Soldado Rock

=== Wildlife sanctuary ===
The island was proclaimed a wildlife sanctuary in 1934 primarily for protection of seabirds granting it full legal protection by the Ministry of Agriculture, Forestry Division. Key species identified in the sanctuary protection include the sooty tern (Onychoprion fuscatus) and brown noddy (Anous stolidus). The island is a nesting ground for these species during the months of March and July. Other species noted on the island include the sandwich tern (Thalasseus sandvicensis), grey-breasted martin (Progne chalybea), magnificent frigatebird (Fregata magnificens), and brown booby (Sula leucogaster).

A subspecies of the short-tailed zygodont or common cane mouse (Zygodontomys brevicauda soldadoensis) was first identified on the island in 1965 and published in the American Museum of Natural History. Other animals observed on the island include the cane toad (Rhinella marina) and green iguana (Iguana iguana).

=== Ownership negotiations ===
After Trinidad became a British colony in 1797 from Spain, Soldado Rock remained a disputed territory between Venezuela and British Trinidad and Tobago. Negotiations for settling the border dispute and defining the maritime boundary between the two countries began in 1939 and were led by geologist Hans Gottfried Kugler. Negotiations were influenced by considerations for placing anti-submarine devices between Venezuela and T&T territory as World War II was underway. As part of the negotiated agreement, Venezuela would cede Soldado Rock to T&T for Patos Island in the Dragon's Mouth, located 4 km east of the Venezuelan mainland. The agreements were formalized on February 26, 1942, in Caracas.

=== Modern history ===
During World War II the island was used as target practice for bombing and machine guns, which led to some damage on the island. The areas around the island form part of the Southwest Soldado Field, a hydrocarbon area important to the oil and gas industry in Trinidad. It is estimated that 43 million barrels of oil in proven reserves exist in the oilfield. Production of the oilfield first started in 1955.

The waters around Soldado Rock are popular for local fishermen due to an abundance of fish in the area, but are dangerous due to rapid tide changes and numerous rocks. The area has been an issue of contention, with fishers from Trinidad and Tobago claiming to be arrested by the Venezuelan National Guard within T&T's maritime borders. The area around the island has also seen piracy attacks on fishers and drug trade activity.

== See also ==
- List of islands of Trinidad and Tobago

== Notes and references ==
=== References ===
- Baptiste, Fitzroy André (1988). War, Cooperation, and Conflict: The European Possessions in the Caribbean, 1939-1945. ABC-CLIO. ISBN 9780313254727.
- Bourne, C. B. (1985). The Canadian Yearbook of International Law, Vol. 23. UBC Press. ISBN 9780774844086.
- Green, Francis Mathews (1885). The Navigation of the Caribbean Sea and Gulf of Mexico. U.S. Government Printing Office.
- Ewan W., Anderson (2003). International Boundaries: A Geopolitical Atlas. Psychology Press. ISBN 9781579583750.
- IUCN Commission on National Parks (1982). IUCN Directory of Neotropical Protected Areas. IUCN. ISBN 9780907567622.
- Joseph, Edward Lanzar (1838). History of Trinidad. A.K. Newman & Co.
- Maury, Carlotta Joaquina (1929). "The Soldado Rock Type Section of Eocene". The Journal of Geology. 37 (2). The University of Chicago Press: 177–181. Bibcode:1929JG.....37..177M. doi:10.1086/623603. S2CID 140705738.
- Morison, Samuel Eliot (1986). The Great Explorers: The European Discovery of America. Oxford University Press. ISBN 9780195042221.
