= Basilica of Our Lady of El Valle =

Coordinates: 10.98269°N 63.88417°W

- Basílica Menor Nuestra Señora de El Valle
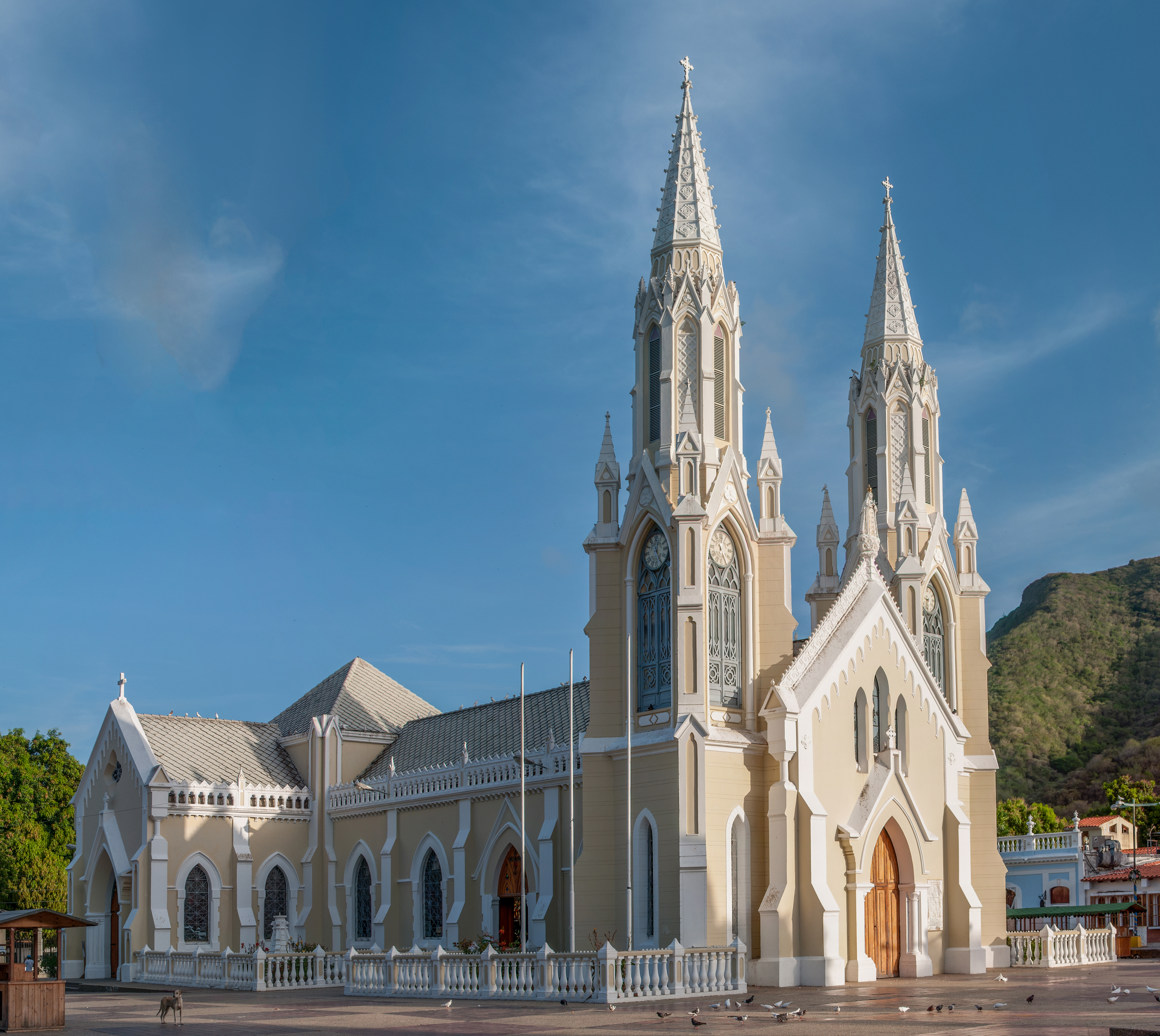
- Basilica of Our Lady of El Valle
- Location: Margarita Island
- Country: Venezuela
- Denomination: Roman Catholic Church

Architecture
- Style: Gothic Revival

The Basilica of Our Lady of El Valle (Spanish: Basílica Menor Nuestra Señora de El Valle) It is a Gothic Revival basilica located in El Valle del Espíritu Santo a town on the island of Margarita, of Nueva Esparta state, in northwestern Venezuela. Its name is in honor of the patron saint of the town and the Venezuelan Navy: the Virgen del Valle.

== History ==
After being founded the church San Nicolás de Bari, it was declared Basilica of Nueva Esparta state on September 8, 1955, so that from that date its festivities are held, beginning with the descent of the Virgin on 8 September each year, is placed where the public can see it up close. On 8 December is the rise of the Virgin, which is placed on an altar located at the top where the priest officiates masses.

Initially, it was a small church, but the building has been modified several times. One of the modifications was coordinated by Father Philip Martinez in 1733. It was declared a Minor Basilica by Pope John Paul II in 1995.

=== The image ===
The image of the Virgen del Valle in 1931.

According to the historian José Figueroa, the image of the Virgin arrived from Spain around 1510 at the settlement of Santiago de Cubagua, on Cubagua Island, which became the city of Nueva Cádiz in 1528. After a hurricane destroyed the pearl-fishing settlement in December 1541, the image was taken to Margarita Island and placed in a small church of straw and bahareque. According to tradition, it was entrusted for a time to the Guaiqueri people, and some historians place the origins of the devotion among them.

On 8 September 1911 the image received a canonical coronation, and the Virgin was proclaimed patroness of eastern Venezuela and of fishermen.

=== Feast ===
The main feast is held on 8 September, when the image is carried in procession through El Valle del Espíritu Santo. Since 2011 the central Mass has been celebrated at the Campo Eucarístico, an open-air venue in García Municipality set up on land next to the basilica for the centenary of the coronation, whose creation was facilitated by the Aspite family. In March 2026 the same family presented the Diocese of Margarita with a Carrara marble statue of the Virgin, carved in Italy by Gianni and Mario Bertini, as an ex-voto.

=== Miracle of the pearl ===
Several miracles are attributed to the Virgin by local tradition. The best known concerns a pearl diver named Domingo, whose leg was wounded by a stingray and became gangrenous. According to the story, after his wife prayed to the Virgin the leg healed, and the diver promised her the first pearl he found; the pearl he later recovered was shaped like a leg and bore the mark of a scar. It is displayed in the Diocesan Museum of El Valle del Espíritu Santo.

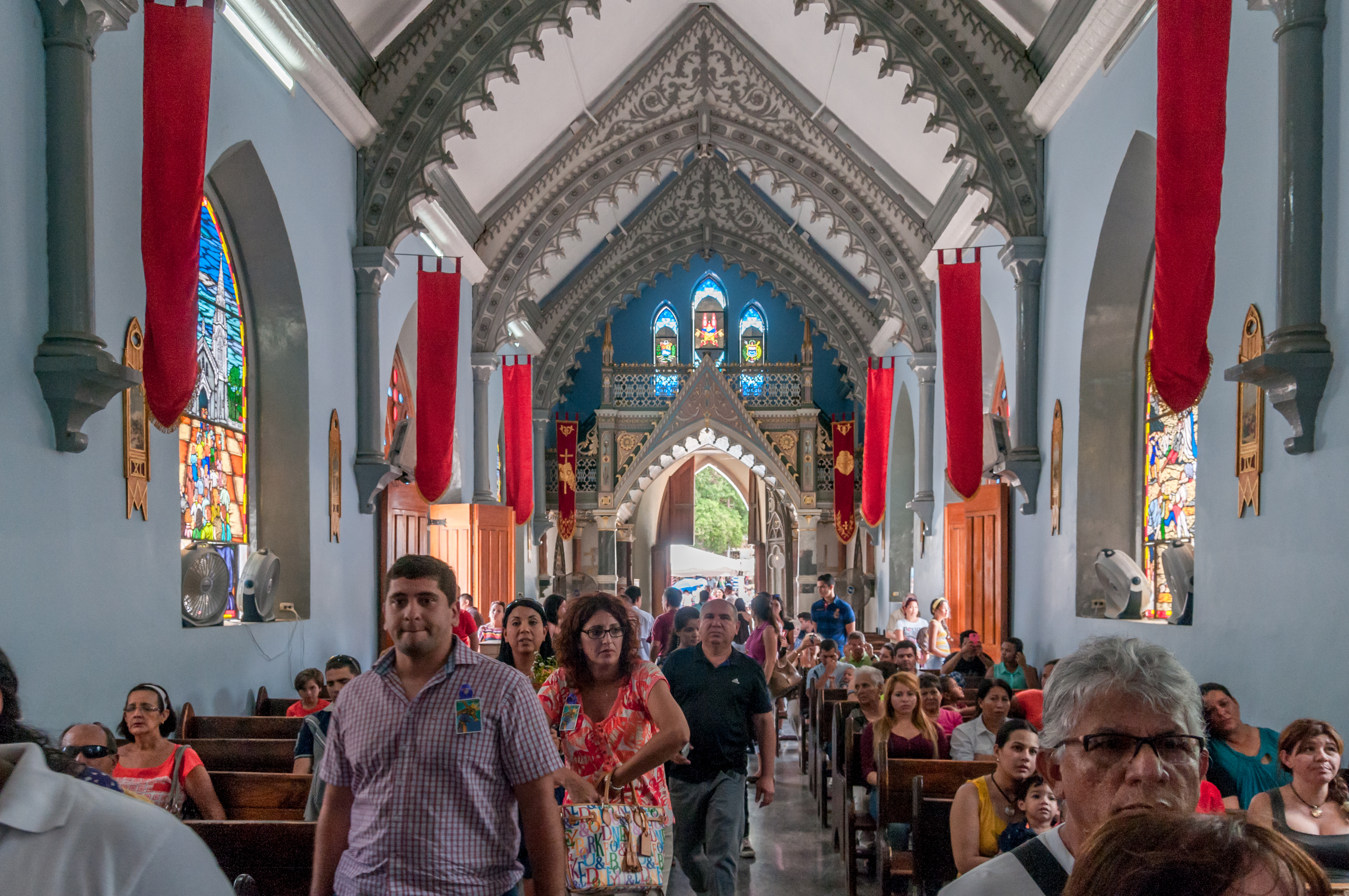
Internal View

== See also ==
- Roman Catholicism in Venezuela
- Virgen del Valle
