= Chacachacare =

Island in the Republic of Trinidad and Tobago

Coordinates: 10°41′N 61°45′W

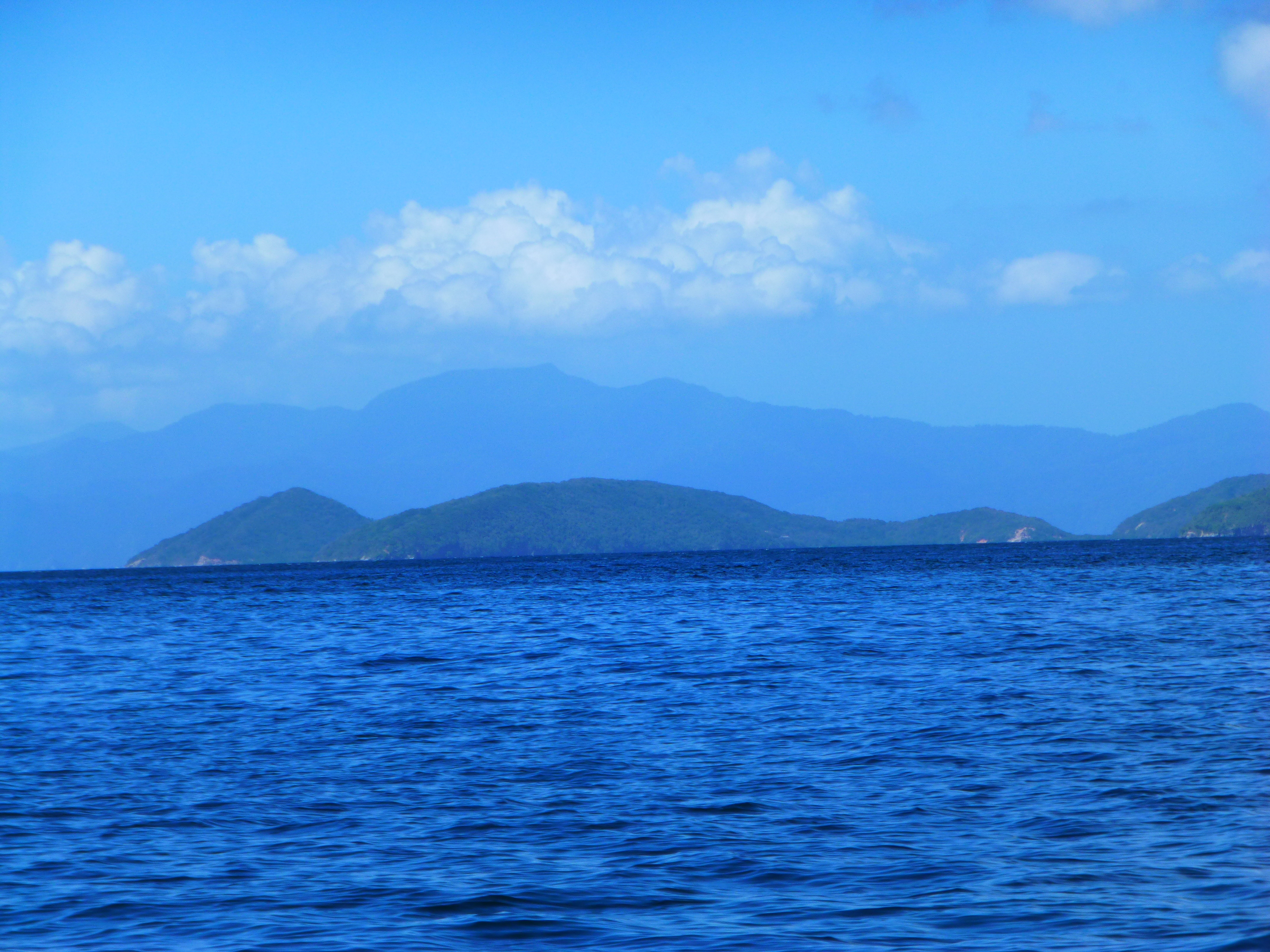
- Chacachacare island, with the Paria Peninsula in Venezuela in the background

Geography
- Archipelago: Bocas Islands
- Total islands: 1

Administration
- Trinidad and Tobago

Demographics
- Population: Minor for operation of a Lighthouse and Radar station (2015)

Chacachacare) is an island in the Republic of Trinidad and Tobago, located at 10° 41' north latitude and 61° 45' west longitude. The island is 360 hectares (900 acres) in area.

It is one of the Bocas Islands, which lie in the Bocas del Dragón (Dragons' Mouth) between Trinidad and Venezuela. Chacachacare is the westernmost of the Bocas Islands which belong to Trinidad and Tobago. Patos Island, which lies further west, was part of Trinidad and Tobago until 1942, when it was ceded to Venezuela in exchange for Soldado Rock.

== History ==
The island was spotted by Christopher Columbus on his third New World voyage on 12 August 1498, and his little fleet spent the night anchored in Monkey Harbour. He named the island 'Port of Cats' because he heard roars of what he thought were wildcats, mistaking the call of howler monkeys for wildcats. It has also been called "El Caracol" (the Snail) because of its shape. At various times in its history Chacachacare has served as a cotton plantation, a whaling station and a leper colony.

The Venezuelan revolutionary Santiago Mariño, who later joined forces with Simón Bolivar and was instrumental in the liberation of Venezuela from Spanish rule, used Chacachacare as a base for his successful 1813 invasion of Venezuela with a tiny band of 45 "Patriots". His sister, Concepción Mariño, played a part in the Venezuelan War of Independence from her estate on the island.

The island became a leper colony, established by the British government of the colony of Trinidad in the 1860s. The men and women of the colony were kept separate, they were not allowed visitors from the outside and were forbidden to leave. The lepers were cared for by French Dominican nuns, two of whom caught leprosy; one of the two committed suicide.

In 1942, 1,000 U.S. Marines were stationed on Chacachacare and built barracks all over the island, bringing with them diesel generators, which provided electrical power to the island for the first time. The authorities began to relax the strict rules of the colony, for instance, allowing men and women to mix. With improved medical treatment for leprosy, and the decline of the Dominican order, the island was abandoned after 1984, when the nuns left their quarters and the last leper on the island died.

In May 1999, Donald Trump visited Chacachacare during the Miss Universe contest and contemplated having a casino and hotel built on the island.

Today, Chacachacare remains uninhabited, except for staff maintaining a lighthouse on the summit of the island. The Hindu Temple founded in 1945 continues to be functional with occasional religious activities. It is also regularly used for camping and visits by recreational boaters. Many Trinidadians go to this island, as well as Monos and Huevos, for day trips. This is popularly referred to as "going down the islands".

== Lighthouse ==
Chacachacare Lighthouse is an inactive lighthouse located in the northern part of the island. The tower, built in 1897, has a height of 15 metres (49 ft), and is painted white with a red lantern.

== Places ==
=== Bolo Rocks ===
The Bolo Rocks are a series of rocks located at the southwestern point of Chacachacare. They were named after a slave called Bolo who worked for a whaling station on the island.

=== Cabresse Island ===
Cabresse Island is a very small islet located just off the northern point of Chacachacare.

== See also ==
- List of islands of Trinidad and Tobago

== Gallery ==
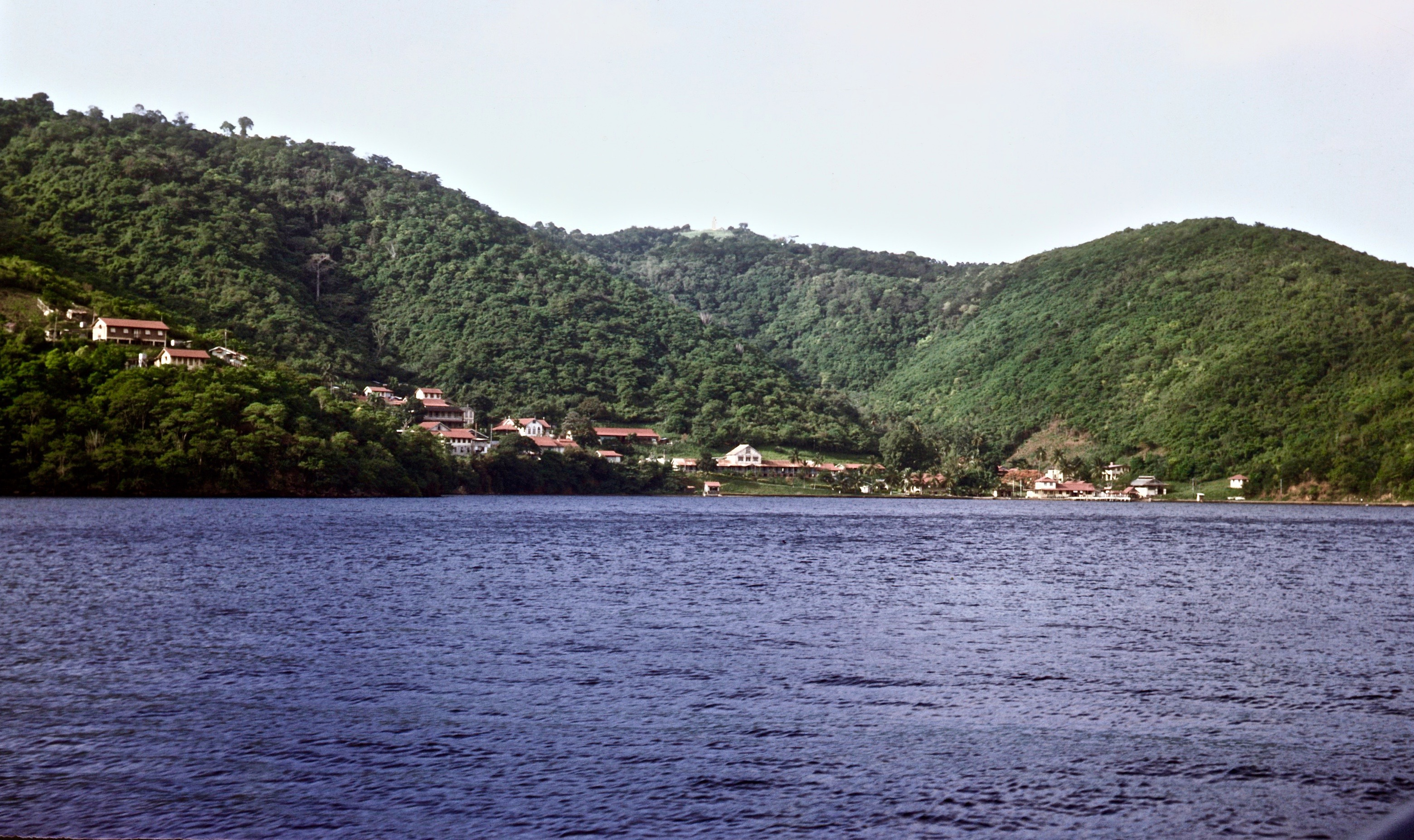
Approaching the leper colony on Chacachacare Island, Trinidad

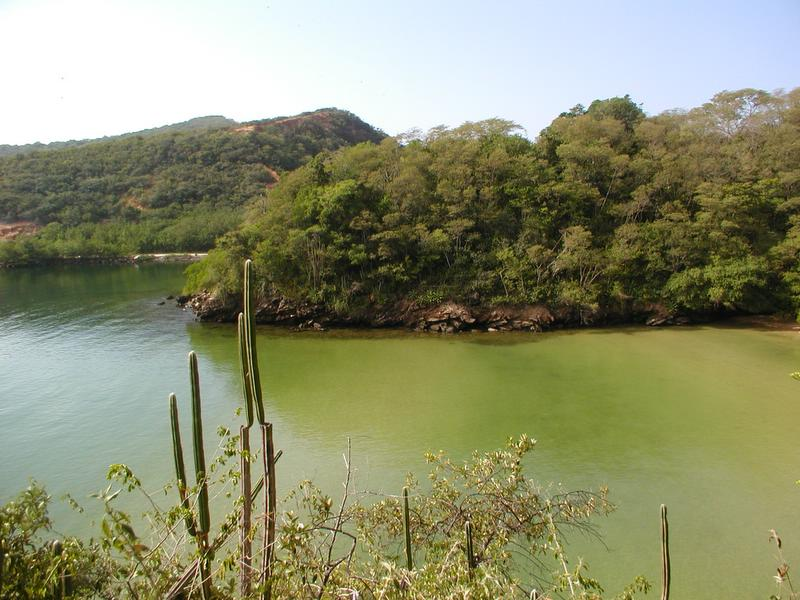
Tropical dry forest, Chacachacare

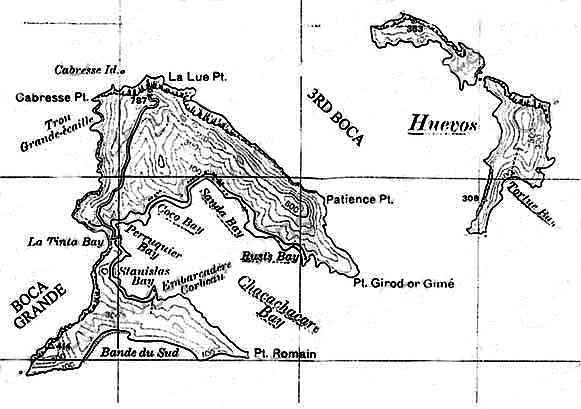
Map of Chacachacare (1927)

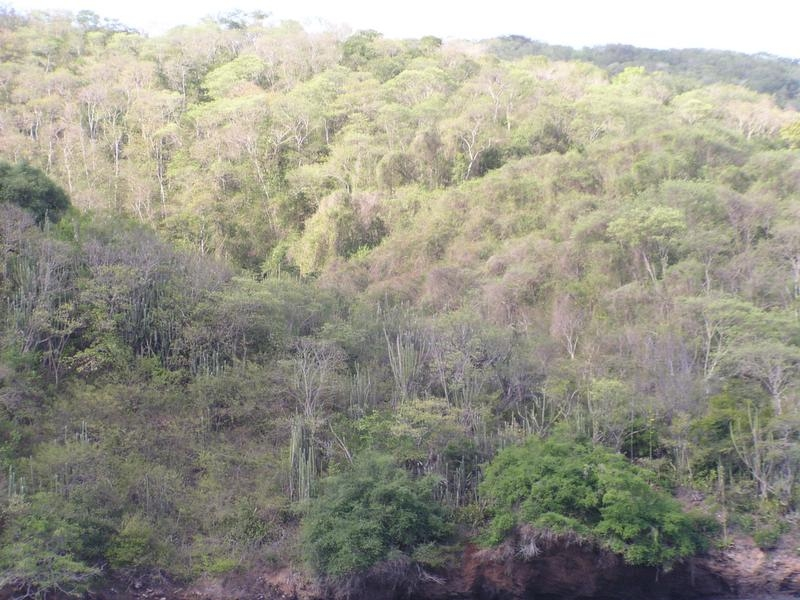
Trinidad and Tobago dry forest on Chacachacare showing the dry-season deciduous nature of the vegetation

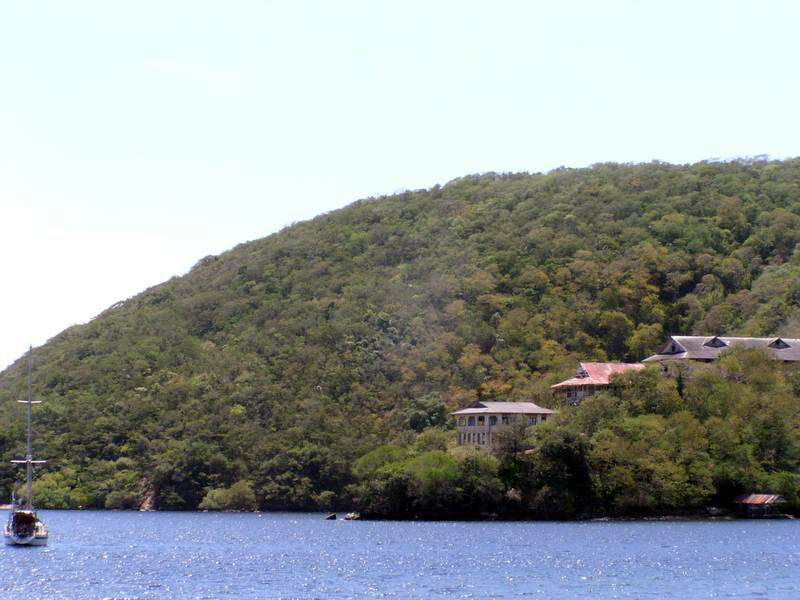
Abandoned Nun's Quarters, Chacachacare
