= Concepción Mariño =

Venezuelan heroine (1790–1854)

Concepción Mariño Carige Fitzgerald (1790 – 1854) was a woman involved in the Venezuelan War of Independence.

== Biography ==
Born on 1790, in El Valle del Espíritu Santo, Mariño was raised in a wealthy family. She was the daughter of Santiago Mariño de Acuña, a Spaniard who had established himself in Venezuela and an Irish woman, Atanasia Carige Fitzgerald; she was the sister of Santiago Mariño. Her parents owned estates on the island of Trinidad and eastern Venezuela, including one on the islet of Chacachacare and another in Delta Amacuro. She married Jose Maria Sanda; they had five children. After marriage, she inherited the estate of Chacachacare and accumulated substantial assets in land and property.

After the capitulation of the First Republic in mid-1812, Mariño's ranch in Chacachacare became the meeting place for Republicans. Mariño played a key role, taking charge of weapons smuggling from Trinidad to the mainland to be used by the troops of Simon Bolivar, though this caused a lawsuit under the authority of British martial law.

The campaign to liberate eastern Venezuela began on January 2, 1813, on the Chacachacare estate. It included the drafting and signing of the Acta Chacachacare by Santiago Mariño, Francisco Azcue, Jose Francisco Bermudez, Manuel Piar and Manuel Valdes, which mentions Mariño as a "magnanimous woman", and started the Campaña de Oriente. In 1821, when Venezuela was facing the threat of Miguel de la Torre, Mariño was involved in shipping weapons from Jamaica for the Bolivar Army.

She died in Chacachacare, in 1854.
