= Virgen del Valle =

Roman Catholic title of the Virgin Mary

La Virgen del Valle Virgin of the Valley
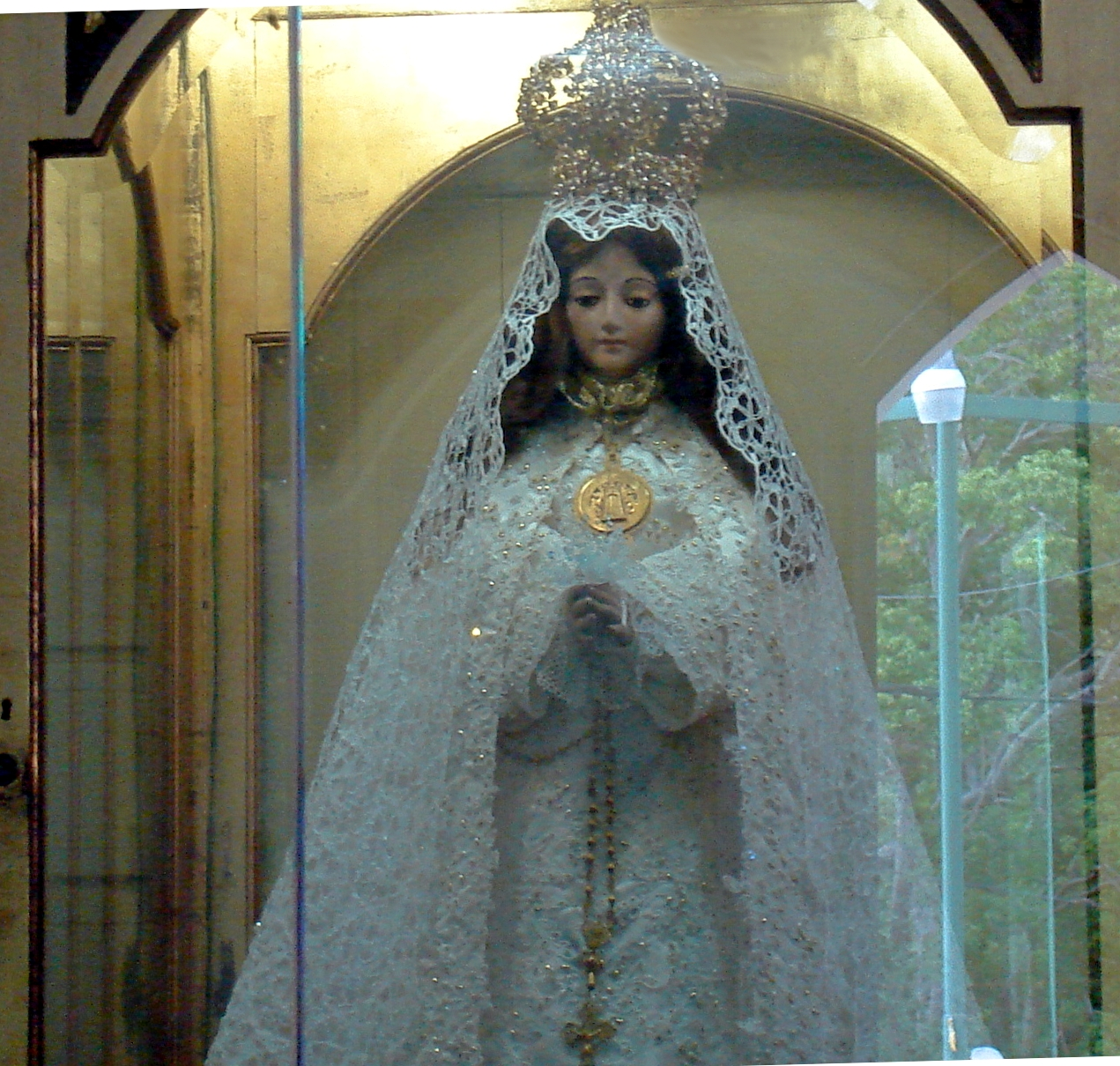
- Virgen del Valle

Virgen del Valle Patroness of Margarita Island
- Venerated in: Catholic Church (Latin Church)
- Major shrine: Basilica of Our Lady of El Valle
- Feast: 8 September
- Attributes: Blessed Virgin Mary
- Patronage: Margarita Island

The Virgin of the Valley (Spanish: Virgen del Valle or Nuestra Señora del Valle) is a Roman Catholic title of the Blessed Virgin Mary venerated in Margarita Island, Venezuela and Catamarca, Argentina.

In Venezuela, the Virgin is the Patroness of Eastern Venezuela, and her feast day is held on 8 September in her sanctuary in Margarita Valley near Porlamar.

Pope Leo XIII granted a Canonical coronation towards the Argentinian image on 12 April 1891 while Pope Pius X crowned the Venezuelan image on 8 September 1911.

== In Venezuela ==
The Spanish conquerors brought the image of the Virgin Mary to Nueva Cádiz city in Cubagua Island. After a huge hurricane hit this island in 1542, the image was moved to El Valle del Espíritu Santo in Margarita Island whereby the virgin was renamed as the Virgin of the Valley.

There is also an image of Virgen del Valle in "Iglesia Nuestra Señora del Valle" located in Vista Alegre in Caracas.

In 1541, Margarita Island suffered from extreme drought. Believing in her power, the people decided to bring the Virgin in a procession. According to some accounts, when the procession arrived in Asunción city, a heavy rain took place.

== In Argentina ==
Catamarca

The center of the City of Catamarca hosts the cathedral of Our Lady of the Valley, Patron Saint of the city. Throughout the year, thousands of faithful believers from all parts of the country visit the cathedral to see the image of the virgin.

The spectacular temple of Our Lady of the Valley is the most important in the Province of Catamarca. It was designed by architect and town planner Luis Caravatti and constructed between 1859 and 1875 with a strong Neo-classical style. At that time, Vicario Seguro worked very hard to build this cathedral. In fact, he persuaded Justo Jose de Urquiza to make a donation of a sum of money for its construction. Certainly, many pilgrims also collaborated on the same purpose. The temple is so superb that not only does it attract the pilgrims but also the visitors to Catamarca, who cannot miss this architectural jewel. Its facade has a big entrance hall which extends towards the sidewalk and two side towers almost forty meters high.

In the Argentinean Army, Our Lady of the Valley is the patron of the paratroopers.

== Gallery ==
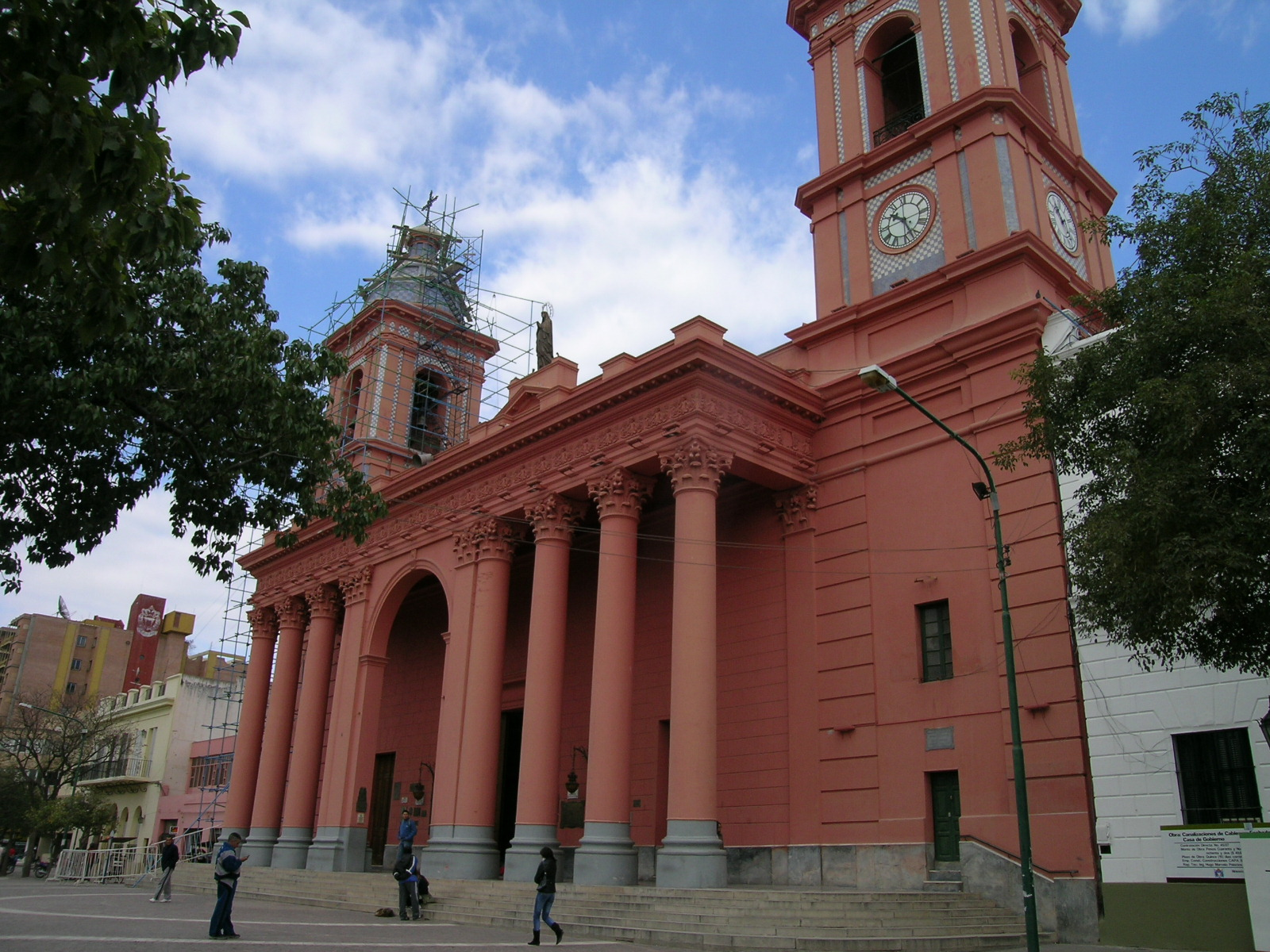
Cathedral Our Lady of the Valley (Catamarca, Argentina).

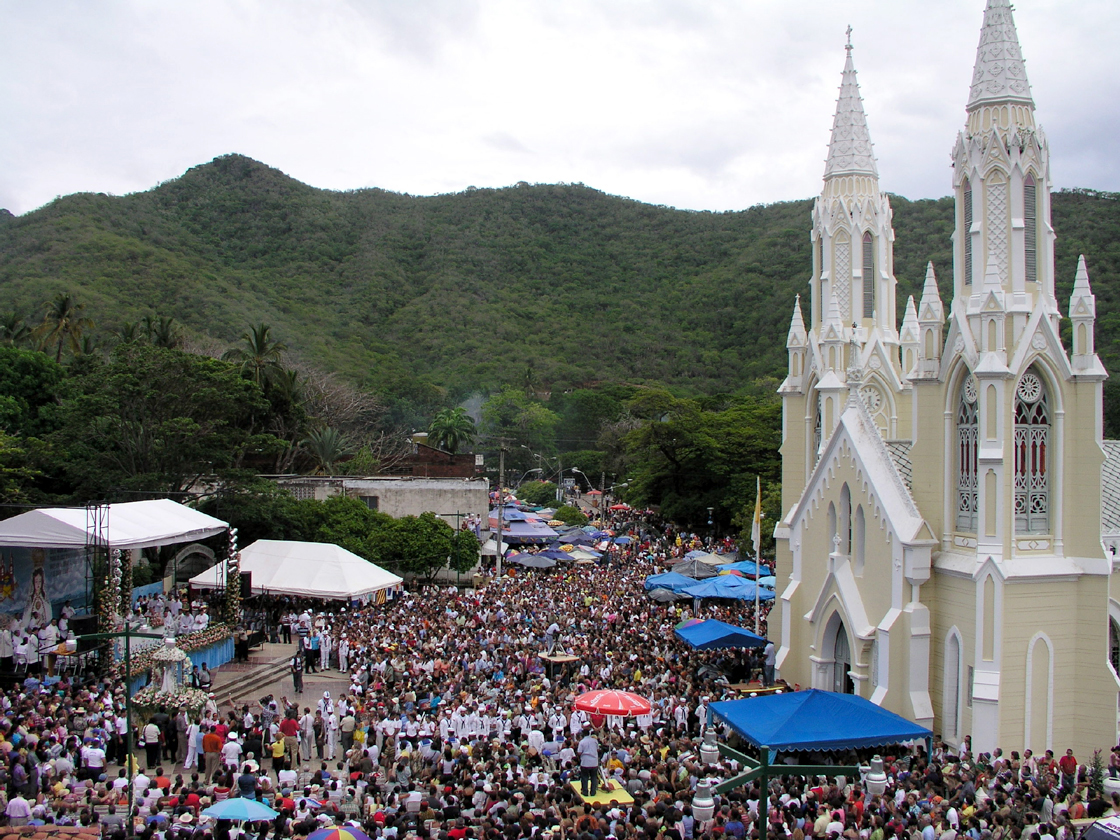
Holiday celebrated in the Virgin of the Valley day (El Valle, Nueva Esparta, Venezuela).

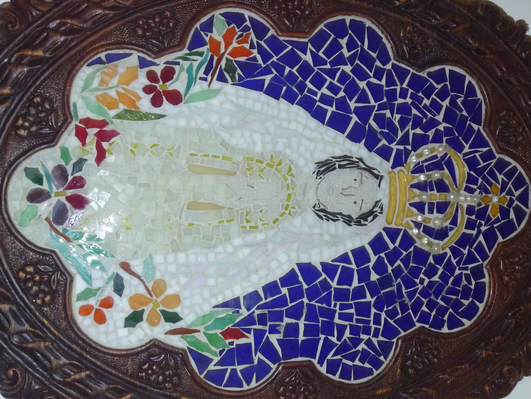
Virgin of the Valley's Mural. In Margarita Island, Venezuela

== See also ==
- Venezuela
- Isla Margarita
- Mary, mother of Jesus
