= Patos Island (Venezuela) =

Federal dependency of Venezuela

Patos Island Isla de Patos
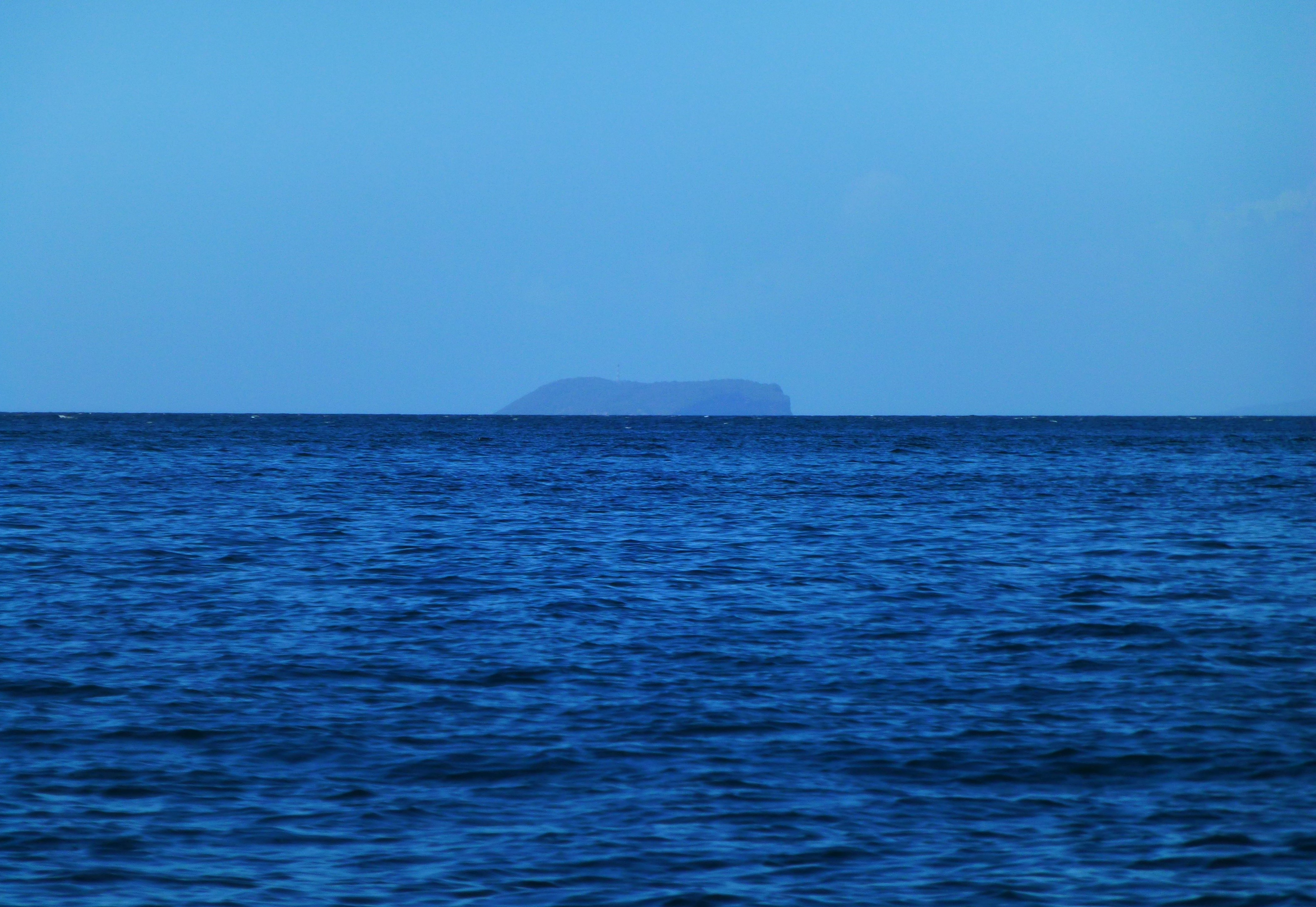
- Patos Island, as seen from the north-east

- Location within Trinidad and Tobago

Geography
- Total islands: 1

Administration
- Venezuela
- Status: Federal Dependency

Demographics
- Population: Uninhabited (2015)

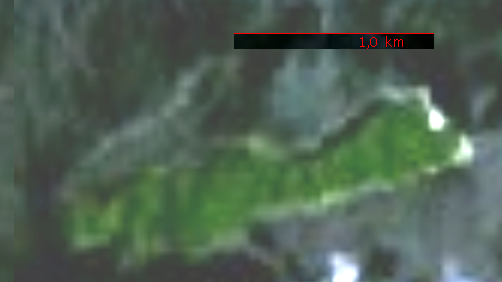
Patos Island

Patos Island (Spanish: Isla de Patos, Duck Island) is a small uninhabited island in the northwestern Gulf of Paria. The island is a part of the Dependencias Federales (Federal Dependencies) of Venezuela.

== Geography ==
Patos Island is located about 540 kilometres (340 mi) northeast of Caracas in the Golfo de Paria (Gulf of Paria). The coordinates are 10°38′18″N 61°51′50″W. It lies in the Boca Grande strait of the Bocas del Dragón (Dragon's Mouth), approximately 4 kilometres (2.5 mi) off the Paria Peninsula of mainland Venezuela and about 10 kilometres (6.2 mi) west-south-west of Chacachacare, which is part of Trinidad and Tobago.

The uninhabited island has an area of only 0.65 square kilometres (0.25 sq mi) with a length of 1.1 kilometres (0.68 mi) and 0.6 kilometres (0.37 mi) wide with the highest point reaching about 100 metres (330 ft).

== History ==
Anglo-Venezuelan Treaty (Island of Patos) Act 1942 (Note: Section 2.)
- Act of Parliament
- Parliament of the United Kingdom
- Long title: An Act to approve a Treaty signed on behalf of His Majesty and on behalf of the President of the United States of Venezuela relating to the Island of Patos.
- Citation: 5 & 6 Geo. 6. c. 17
- Territorial extent: United Kingdom

Dates
- Royal assent: 21 May 1942
- Commencement: 21 May 1942 (Note: The Acts of Parliament (Commencement) Act 1793.)
- Repealed: 8 November 1995

Other legislation
- Repealed by: Statute Law (Repeals) Act 1995

Status: Repealed

Text of statute as originally enacted

Revised text of statute as amended

Patos Island was part of the former British colony of Trinidad and Tobago. In 1859 the United Kingdom began a claim on the island that Venezuela rejected arguing that it was not mentioned in the capitulation of 1797 nor in the Treaty of Amiens of 1802. In 1902 the United Kingdom raised its flag on the island which provoked a strong protest from the Venezuelan government. In 1904 Venezuela included it as part of the Federal territory Colón. On 26 February 1942, the island became part of Venezuela in exchange for Soldado Rock to Trinidad and Tobago and was put under the administration of the Ministerio de Relaciones Interiores (actual Ministry of Interior and Justice) as part of the Dependencias Federales.

== See also ==
- Federal Dependencies of Venezuela
- List of marine molluscs of Venezuela
- List of Poriferans of Venezuela
