= El Valle del Espíritu Santo =

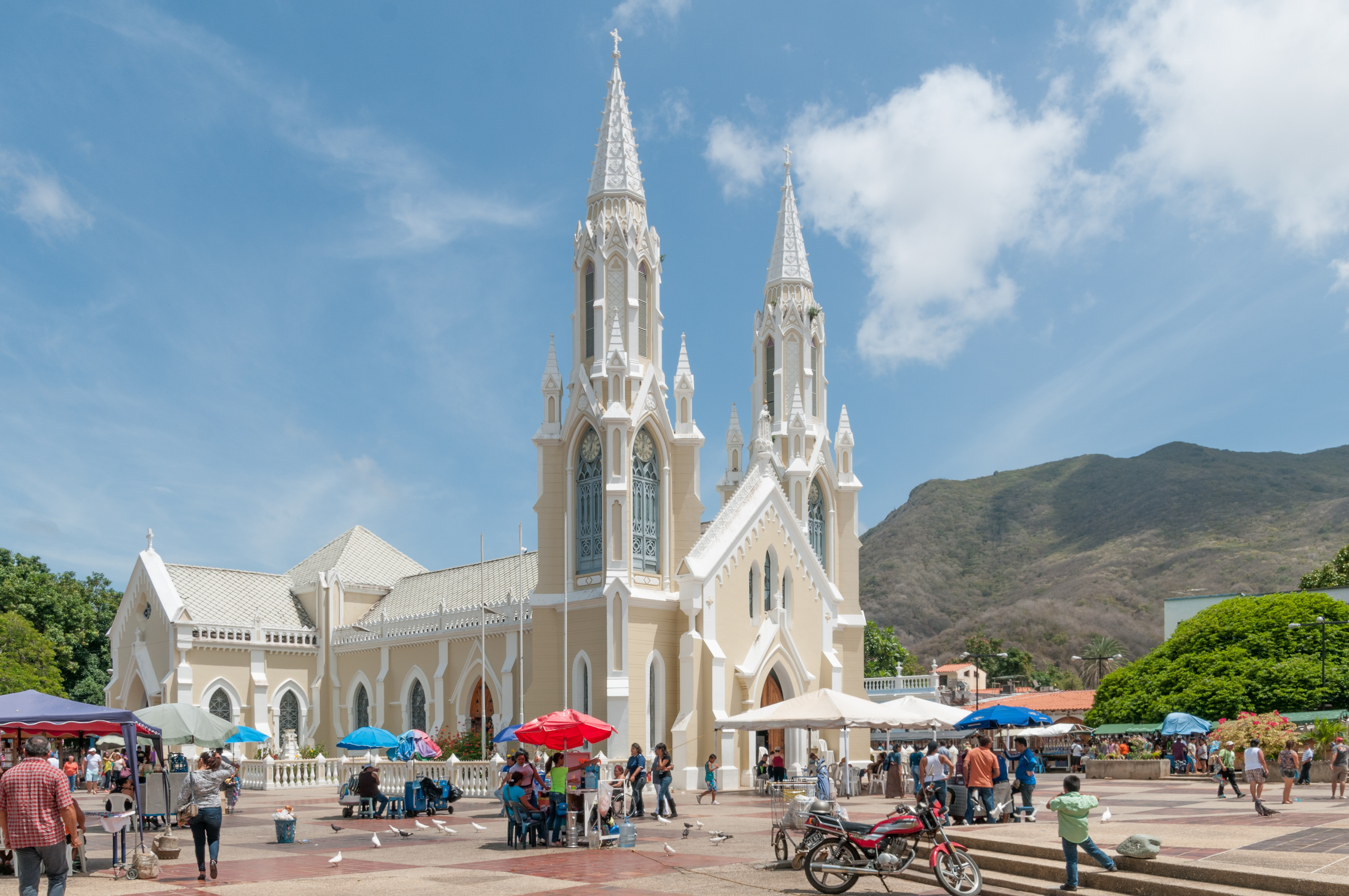
- Flag Seal
- Location within Venezuela
- Coordinates: 10°58′52″N 63°52′43″W
- Country: Venezuela
- State: Nueva Esparta
- Counties: García

Area
  - Total: 89 km^{2} (34 sq mi)
- Elevation: 86 m (282 ft)

Population (2001)
  - Total: 45,606

El Valle del Espíritu Santo is a village near Porlamar, in the Nueva Esparta state of Venezuela. Founded as the capital of the island in 1529, El Valle del Espíritu Santo is just north of Porlamar. It is the birth town of Santiago Mariño and his sister, Concepción Mariño, as well as where the patron of the island, the Virgin of El Valle appeared. The village has a pink-and-white church honoring the Virgin of El Valle. Visitors go to the village all year-round, but especially on her feast day in early September.

== The Virgin of El Valle Church ==
The basilica of Our Lady of El Valle is a building with two main towers. On the inside, it is very well illuminated. The figure of the virgin is in the altar, venerated by all the locals and all the fishers from the country, because she is their patron. The windows are simple and bright. The Diocesan Museum is located next to the church.

== Santiago Mariño Museum ==
The Santiago Mariño Museum is located in front of the church. This is the town were Santiago Mariño, one of the independence heroes, was born. The museum is simple, but interesting. The construction is a typical colonial house with an internal garden. In the rooms, there are many paintings and furniture from the independence years. The museum is only open in the morning.
