= Huevos (island) =

Island in Trinidad and Tobago

Coordinates: 10°42′N 61°43′W

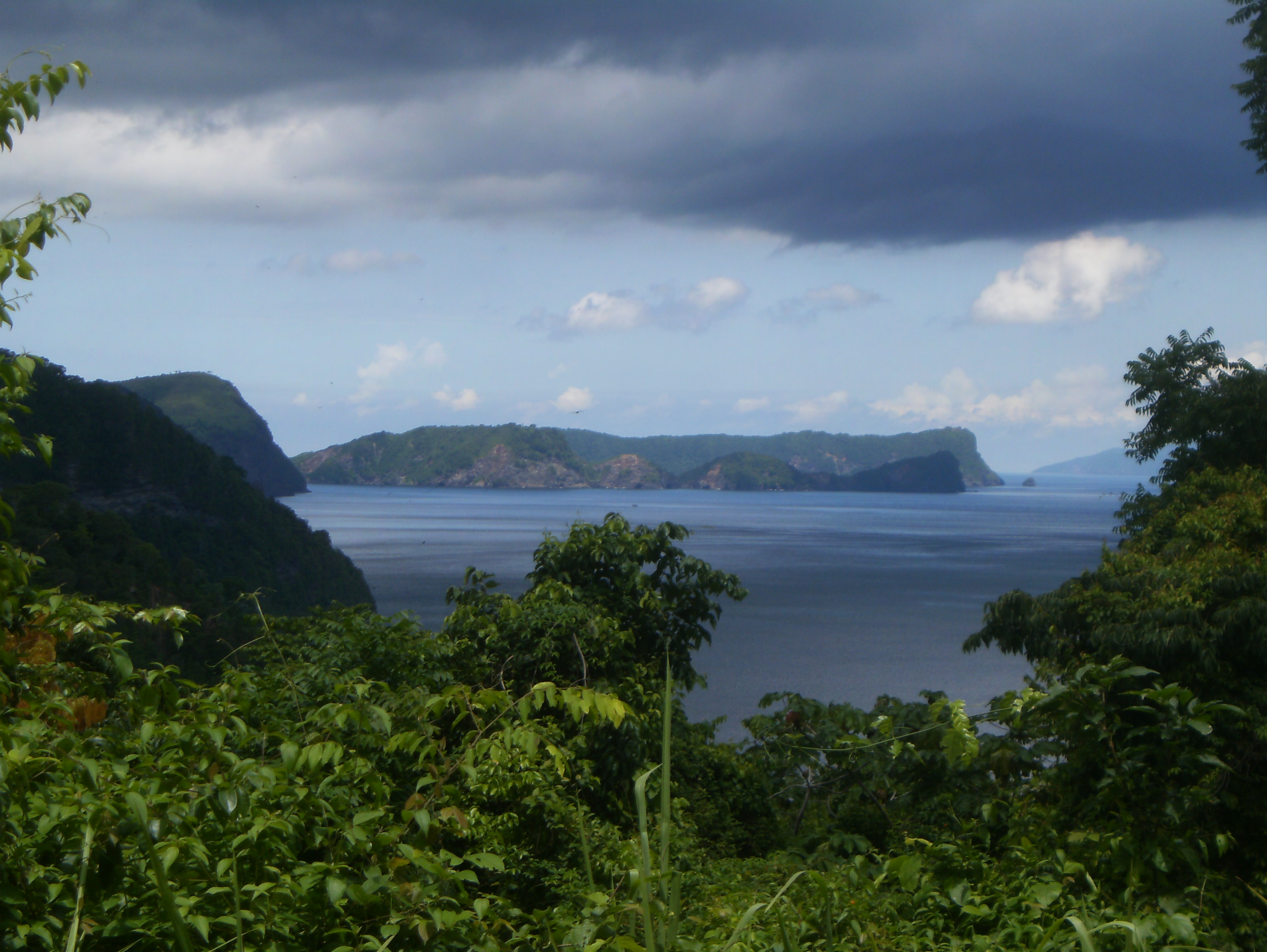
Huevos Island in the centre, with Chacachacare behind it and Venezuela in the distance on the right. View from the Tracking Station in Chaguaramas.

Huevos (Spanish: Eggs) is an island in the Republic of Trinidad and Tobago. The island is 1.01 km^{2} (253 acres) in area. It is one of the "Bocas Islands", which lie in the Bocas del Dragón (Dragons' Mouth) between Trinidad and Venezuela.

== Flora ==
Vegetation of the island includes Yellow Poui, Hog Plum, Naked Indian, and Salt-fish Wood.

== Fauna ==
A number of terrestrial reptiles have been recorded on Huevos, including the Green Iguana (Iguana iguana), Anolis chrysolepis, the Rainbow Whiptail Lizard (Cnemidophorus lemniscatus), the Turnip-tailed Gecko (Thecadactylus rapicauda), the Variegated Gecko Gonatodes ceciliae, the Rusty Trinidad Gecko (Gonatodes cf ferrugineus), Wiegmann's Striped Gecko (Gonatodes vittatus), Mole's Gecko Sphaerodactylus molei, and Boddarts Tropical Racer snake Mastigodryas boddaerti. Additionally, the marine Hawksbill Turtle has been recorded to nest on the sandy beach at Tortue Bay on Huevos Island (the bay's name derived from these visiting turtles, and the island's name derived from their eggs).

Several species of birds visit and some nest on Huevos.

== Places ==
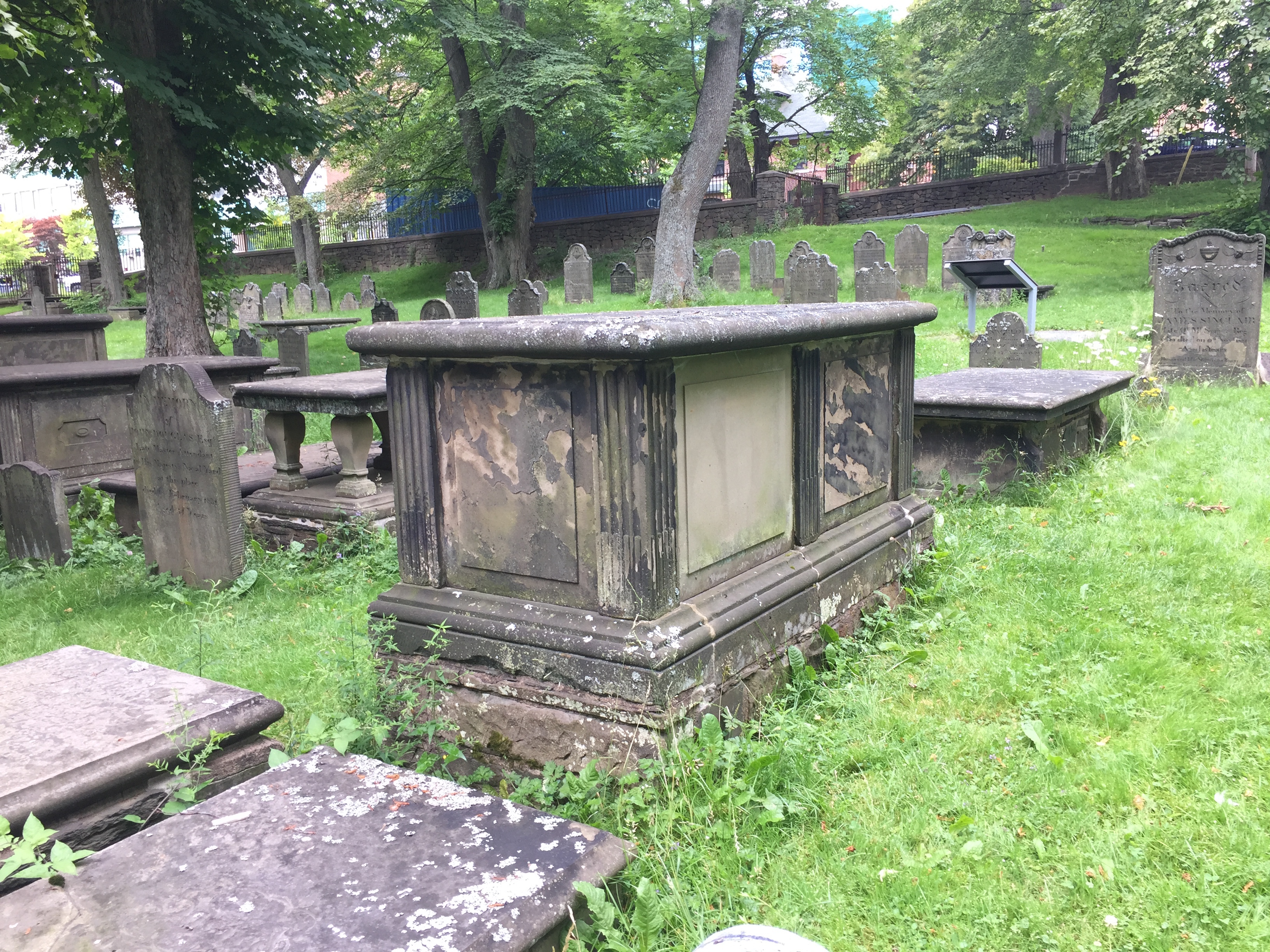
Major Thomas Huxley, survivor of shipwreck, Old Burying Ground (Halifax, Nova Scotia)

Places at Huevos - Cape Garlio, Raya Del Caribe, Parasol (Umbrella) Rocks, Tortue Bay, Balata Bay, Point Braba

=== Parasol Rocks ===
The Parasol Rocks, also known as the Umbrella Rocks, are a series of small rock formations located less than 50 metres to the east of Huevos. On 10 August 1800 a fifth-rate Royal Navy ship, HMS Dromedary was wrecked on the rocks with 500 passengers. All passengers and crew were rescued.

== See also ==
- List of islands of Trinidad and Tobago
