= Monos =

Island in Trinidad and Tobago

Nickname: Monkey Island
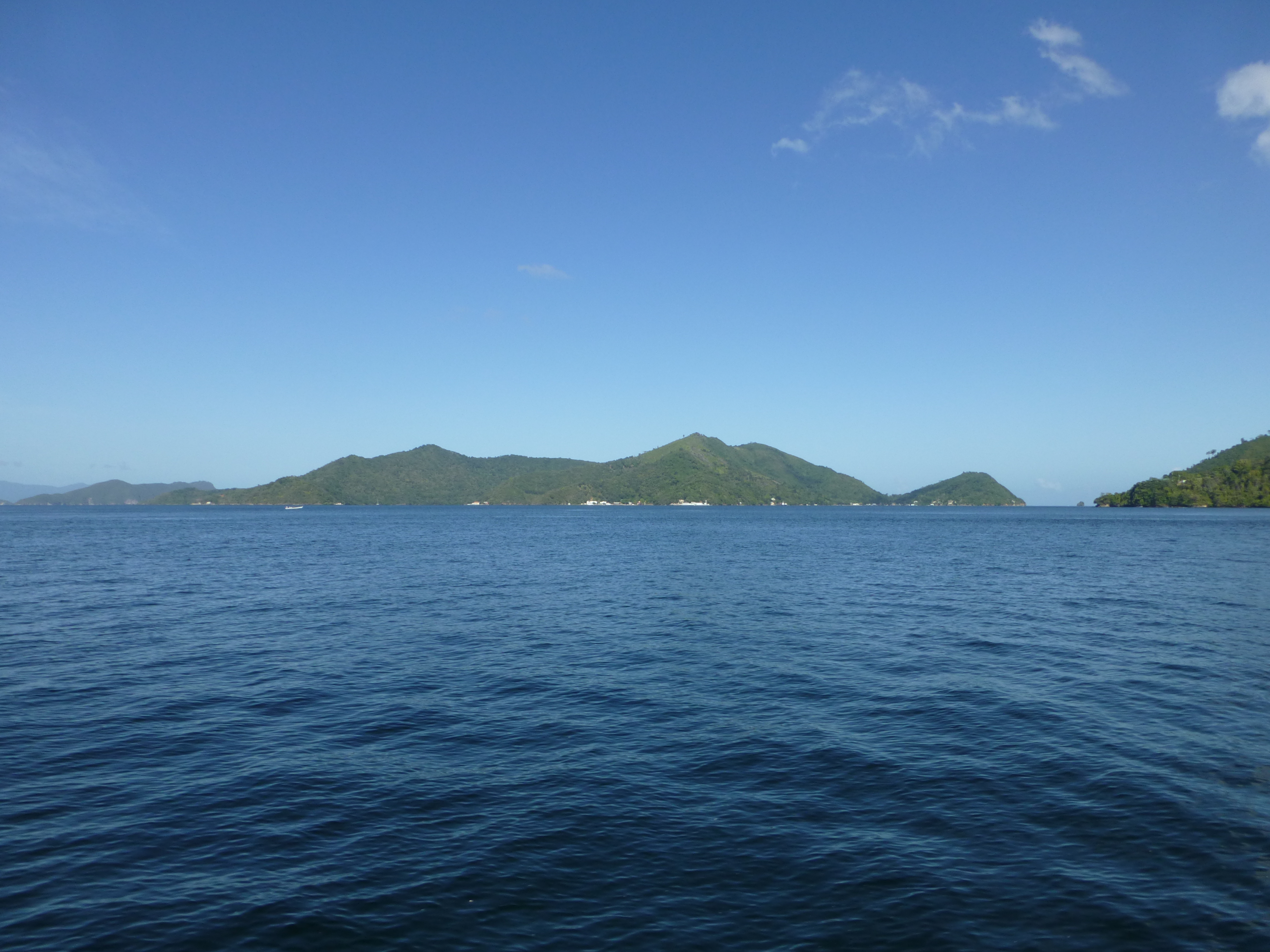
- Monos (between Chacachacare and the Trinidadian Mainland)
- Interactive map of Monos

Geography
- Coordinates: 10°41′42″N 61°41′24″W
- Archipelago: Monos, Gulf of Paria
- Highest elevation: 1,165 ft (355.1 m)

Administration
- Trinidad and Tobago
- Borough: Diego Martin
- City: Chaguaramas

Monos is an island in the Republic of Trinidad and Tobago. It is one of the "Bocas Islands", which lie in the Bocas del Dragón (Dragons' Mouth) between Trinidad and Venezuela. It is so named as the island was once home to noisy red howler monkeys ("monos" being the Spanish term for monkeys). It has an estimated area of 458 hectares (1,130 acres).

== See also ==
- List of islands of Trinidad and Tobago
