= Rockfort (Jamaica) =

Former site of 17th century British fort

Coordinates: 17°57′58.41″N 76°44′6.6″W

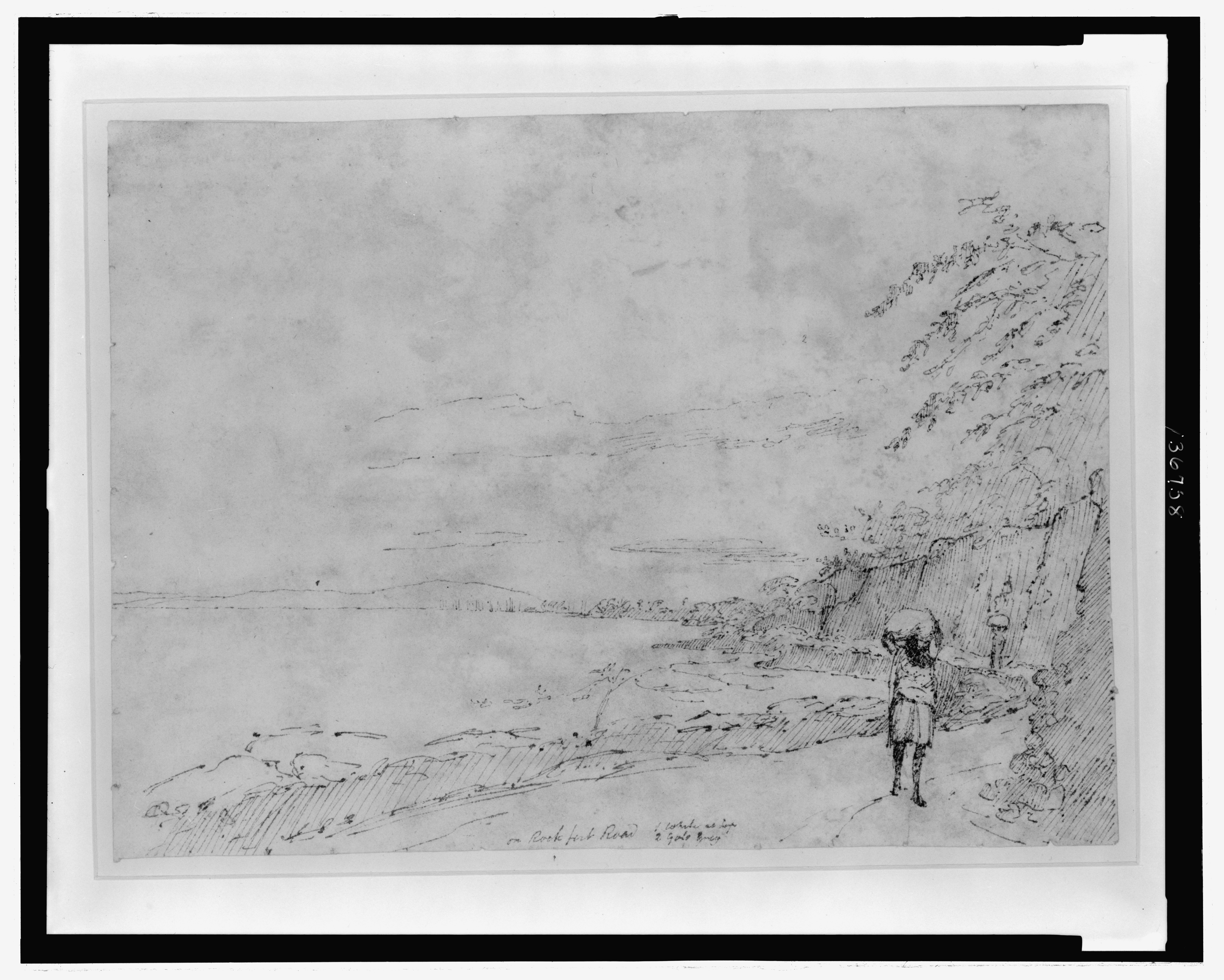
Ink drawing by William Berryman titled "On the Rockfort Road" from 1808

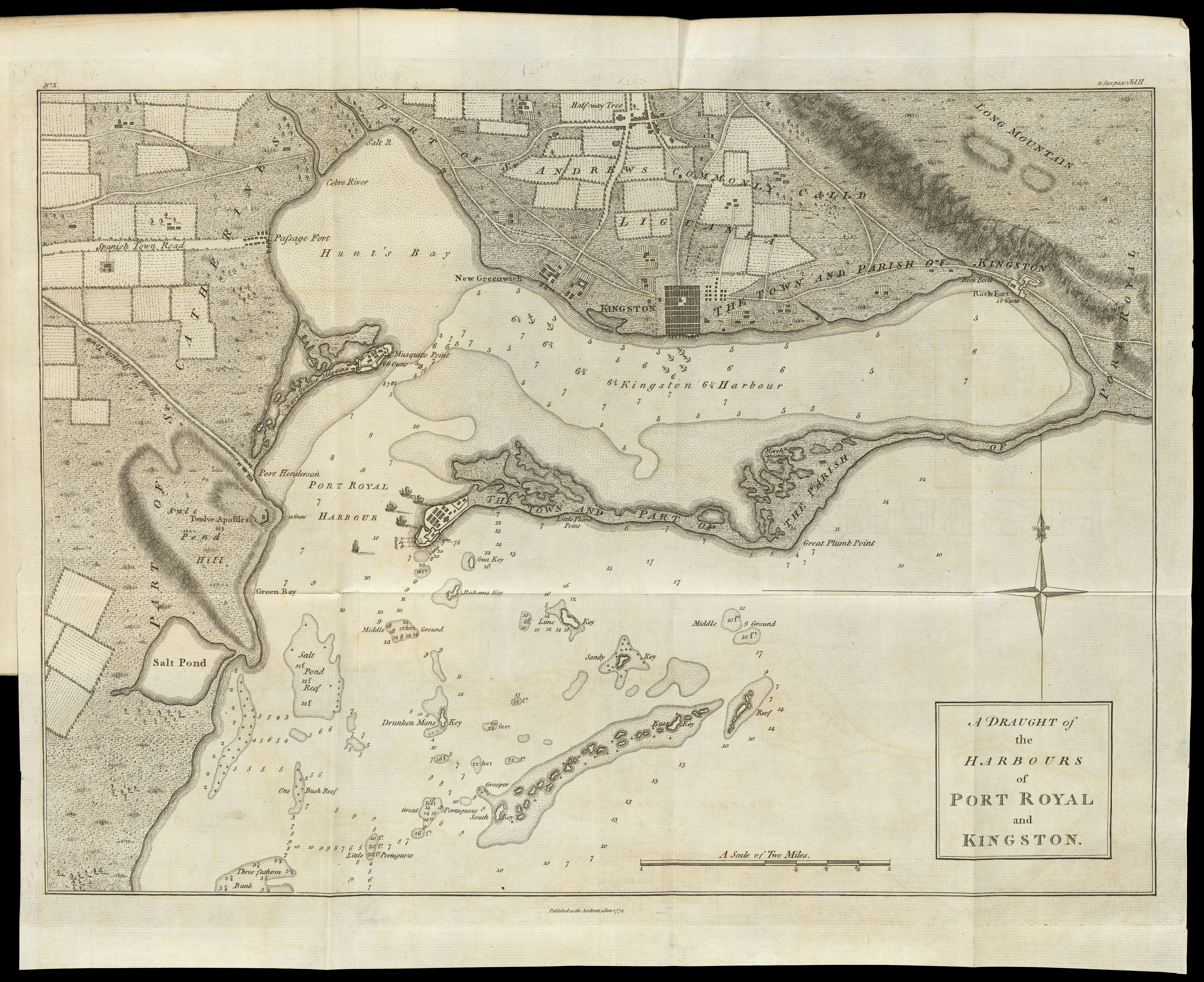
Port Royal and Kingston Harbours (map of 1774). Rockfort is located on the northeastern portion of Kingston Harbour.

Rockfort, (Note: It was also historically known as Rock Fort, Rock-Fort, and The Rocks.) located east of Kingston, Jamaica, in an area previously known as Harbour Head, is the ruins of a 17th century rock fortress once surrounded by a moat. First the site of a British rock fort, it was fortified in 1694 to protect the eastern edge of Kingston against an invasion by the French. To thwart any eastward advance of the Morant Bay Rebellion to Kingston, it was last staffed in 1865. The site that once protected Kingston Harbour is under the administration of the Jamaica National Heritage Trust.

After an earthquake in 1907, a spring formed in the mountains above the area. Spring water now feeds into the Rockfort Mineral Baths located at the site of the fort.

== See also ==
- Port Royal
