= Bocas del Dragón =

Dragon's Mouths Bocas del Dragón
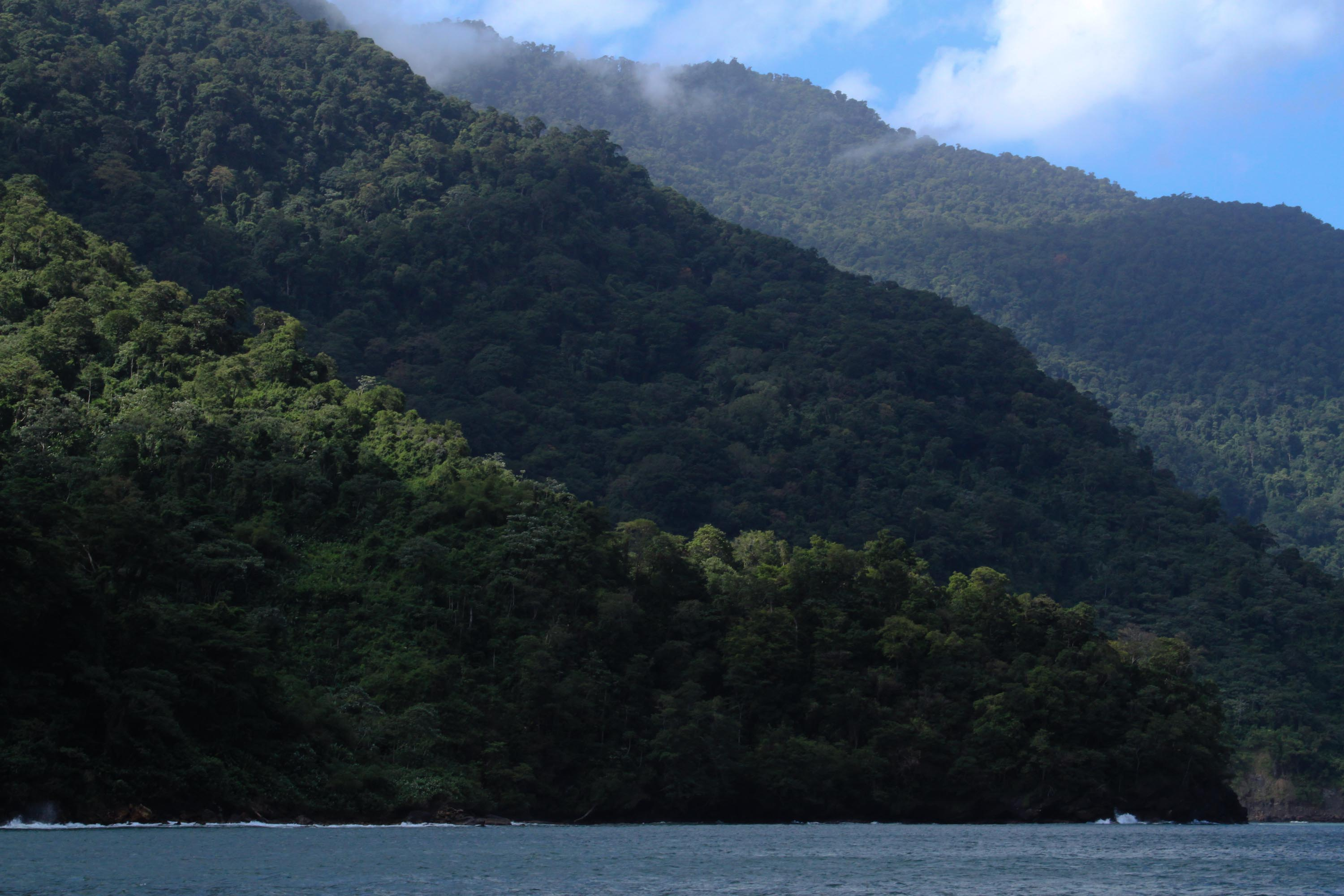
- View of the Paria Peninsula in Venezuela that is separated from Trinidad by the waters of Boca Grande, one of the Bocas del Dragón

- Location within Trinidad and Tobago Location within the Caribbean
- Location: Gulf of Paria–Caribbean Sea (Atlantic Ocean)
- Coordinates: 10°45′N 61°46′W
- Type: Strait
- Basin countries: Venezuela; Trinidad and Tobago

The Bocas del Dragón (Dragon's Mouths) are the series of straits separating the Gulf of Paria from the Caribbean Sea. There are four Bocas, from west to east:

- The Boca Grande or Grand Boca separates Chacachacare from the Paria Peninsula and Patos Island of Venezuela. The international border between Trinidad and Tobago and Venezuela runs through this strait.
- The Boca de Navios or Third Boca which separates Chacachacare from Huevos.
- The Boca de Huevos or Second Boca which separates Huevos from Monos.
- The Boca de Monos or First Boca which separates Monos from the Chaguaramas Peninsula of Trinidad.

The passage was named by Christopher Columbus on his third voyage.
