= Gulf of Paria =

Inland sea between Trinidad and Venezuela

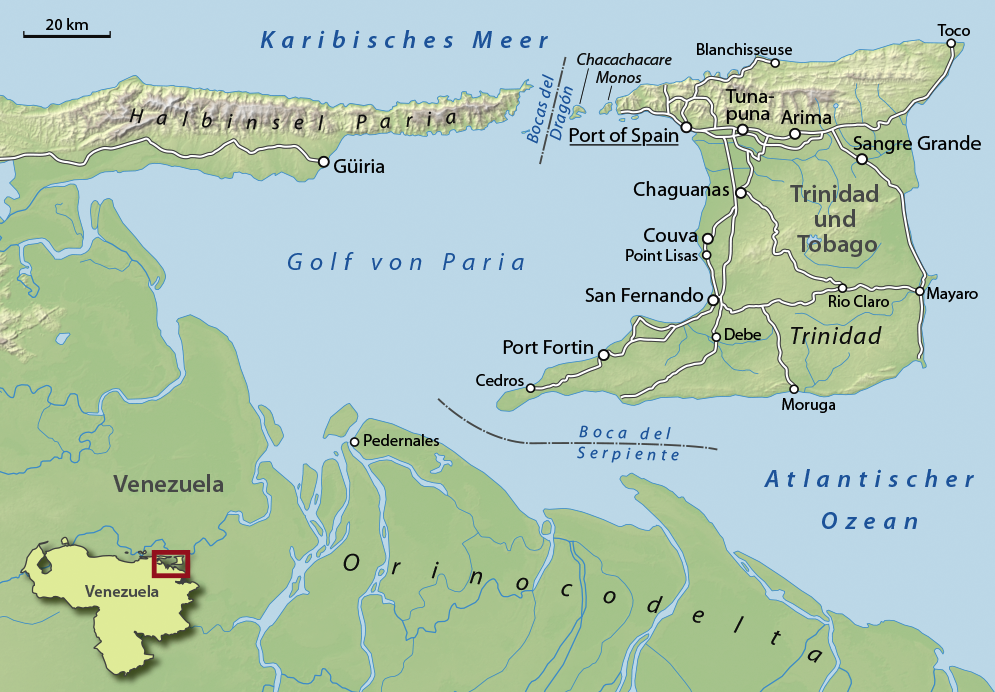
The Gulf of Paria between Venezuela and Trinidad

The Gulf of Paria (/ˈpæriə/ PARR-ee-ə; Spanish: Golfo de Paria) is a 7,800 km^{2} (3,000 sq mi) shallow (180 metres (591 ft) at its deepest) semi-enclosed inland sea located between the island of Trinidad and the east coast of Venezuela. It separates the two countries by as little as 15 kilometres (9.3 mi; 8.1 nmi) at its narrowest and 120 kilometres (75 mi; 65 nmi) at its widest points. The tides within the Gulf are semi-diurnal in nature with a range of approximately 1 metre (3 ft 3 in). The Gulf of Paria is considered to be one of the best natural harbors on the Atlantic coast of the Americas. The jurisdiction of the Gulf of Paria is split between Trinidad and Venezuela with Trinidad having control over approximately 2,940 km^{2} (1,140 sq mi) (37.7%) and Venezuela the remainder (62.3%).

It was originally named the Gulf of the Whale (Spanish: Golfo de la Ballena) by Christopher Columbus, but the 19th-century whaling industry eliminated whales from the area and populations have never recovered. Cartographic sources of the late 18th century repeatedly refer to it as the Sad Gulf (Spanish: Golfo Triste).

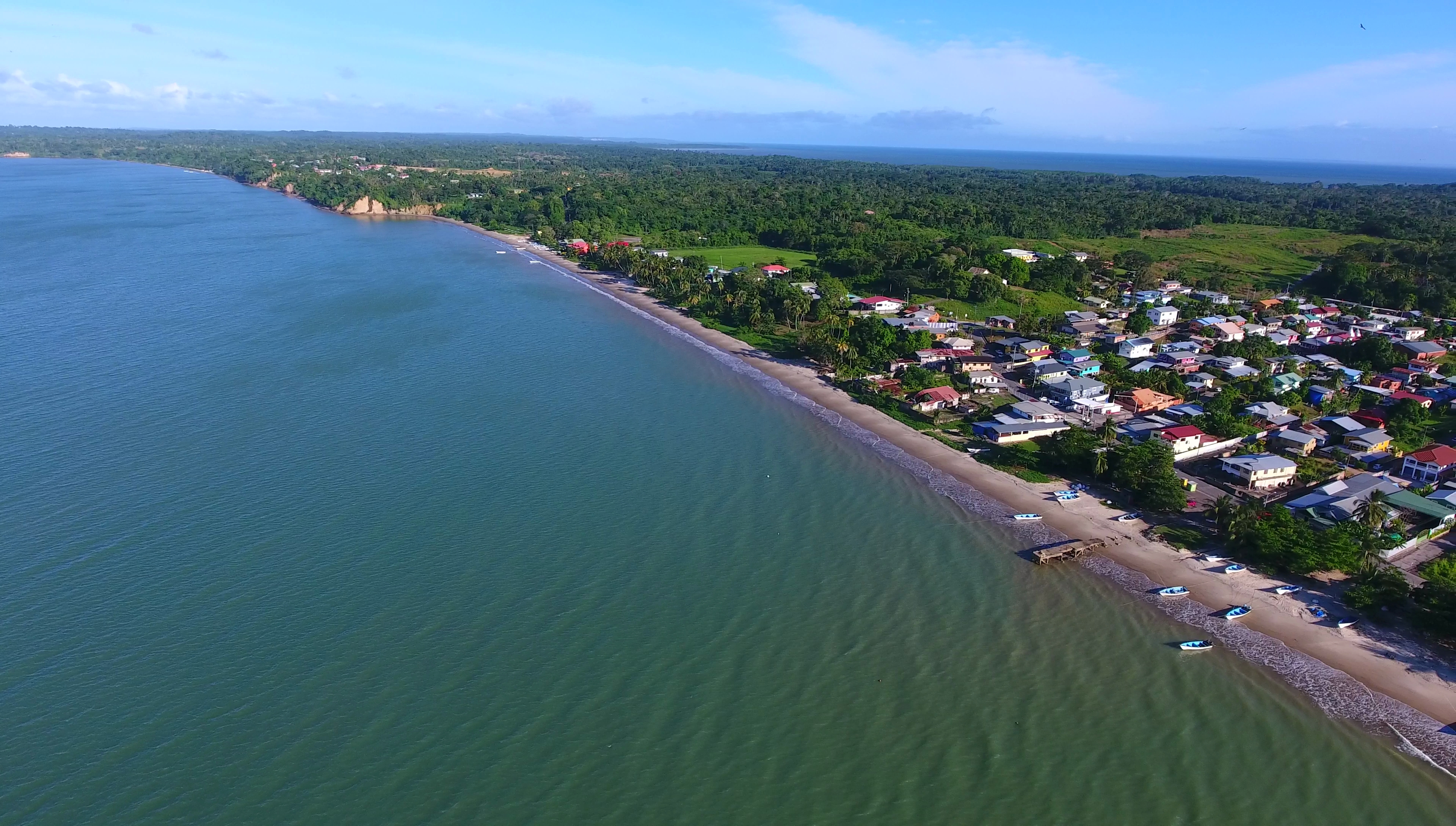
Cedros Bay, with the Columbus Channel in the background

In the north, the Gulf is connected to the Caribbean Sea through the Dragons' Mouths (Spanish: Bocas del Dragón) between the Paria Peninsula of Venezuela and the Chaguaramas Peninsula of Trinidad. In the south, the Gulf is connected to the Atlantic through the Columbus Channel, also known as the Serpent's Mouth (Spanish: Boca de la Serpiente), between the Cedros Peninsula and the Orinoco Delta.

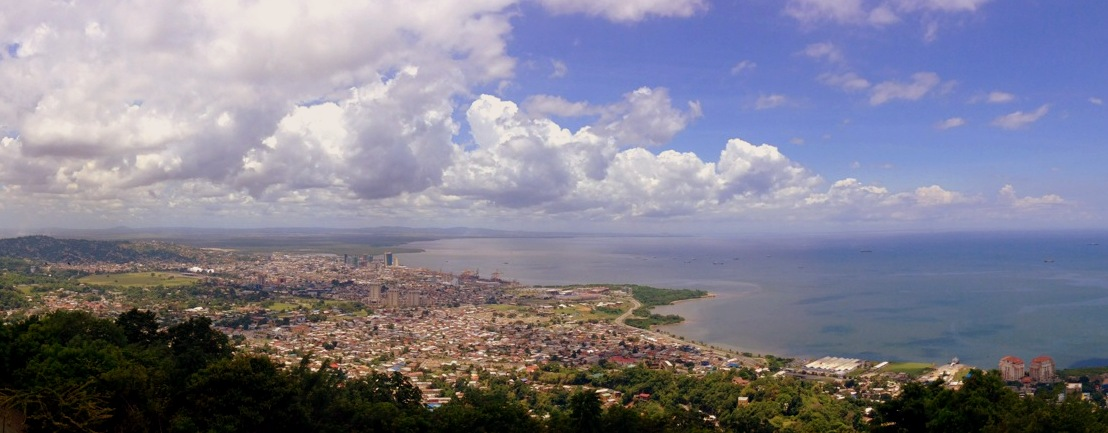
Panoramic view of Gulf of Paria looking south-east.

== Activity ==
=== Fisheries ===
The Gulf of Paria is a brackish water body – wet season salinities are below 23 ppt (parts per thousand) with extensive mangroves along the Venezuelan and Trinidadian coastlines. This body of water is basically a shallow sedimentary basin with a maximum depth of 30 metres (16 fathoms; 98 ft) and a smooth substratum of fine mud with patches of shell debris and sand (Kenny and Bacon, 1981). These conditions lend themselves to favourable fisheries conditions and the Gulf itself is an important fishery (Heileman and Ramsaroop, 1990). The proximity of the Orinoco Delta to the Gulf suggests that these waters are strongly influenced by fluvial discharges from the Amazon and Orinoco River systems, with the intensity of these discharges varying with the seasons (van Andel and Postma, 1954; Gade, 1961). These rivers are thought to be important effectors of nutrient enhancing upwelling currents on the adjacent continental shelf and sources of primary and secondary productivity for the water around Trinidad, especially in the Gulf (Farbes, 1983). As such, Trinidad supports a more productive and diverse exploitable fish and invertebrate resource base than most of the Eastern Caribbean islands (Agard et al. 1996). The Gulf of Paria is the most important fishing ground for shrimp and finfish in Trinidad.

In recent years, Venezuelan pirates have threatened fishermen operating in the region.

=== Oil and natural gas ===
The Gulf of Paria lies entirely within the broad strike-slip plate boundary zone of the southeastern Caribbean. The structure of the Gulf consists of a complex set of transtensional basins superimposed on a fold-and-thrust belt (Serrania del Interior of eastern Venezuela). The petroleum of Trinidad has been generated by prolific Upper Cretaceous source rocks, time equivalent to the La Luna and Querecual formations in Colombia and Venezuela. These source rocks were then overlain by a thick succession of Paleogene deep-water sediments (shales and deep water sandstones) and shallow marine siliciclastic reservoir rocks. The transpression due to the influence of the Caribbean plate created several sub-basins across the Trinidad area; each having distinctive petroleum systems. The hydrocarbon basins in Trinidad are Southern Basin, Columbus Basin, Carupano Basin, Central Range/Darrien Ridge Basin and the Caroni Basin and Gulf of Paria Pull-apart Basin.

The Caroni Basin is a Cenozoic basin bounded to the north by the El Pilar fault zone and the Northern Range fold-thrust belt and to the south by the Central Range fold-thrust belt. Its stratigraphy features a shallowing section from the Miocene which overlies Palaeocene and Lower Cretaceous deep-water sediments. The Gulf of Paria is the western offshore extension of the Caroni basin. However, its deformation is now extensional due to the right-stepping of the dextral El Pilar fault to the dextral Warm Springs fault. The Los Bajos fault separates the Gulf of Paria from the Southern basin sediments. Natural gas has been discovered in the onshore Caroni basin while in the Gulf of Paria, both oil and gas have been discovered.

In 2021 an oil spill was discovered in the gulf. Between 2018 and April 2021 there have been 498 reported oil spills on land and at sea. There have been no resulting prosecutions or fines by Trinidad and Tobago authorities.

== Port and logistics ==
Major ports located within the Gulf of Paria basin include:

UNLOCODE	Port facility name: name	Location: served	Coordinates	Time	Notes
-Trinidad and Tobago side-
TT CVA	Plipdeco's Port of Point Lisas	Couva	10.25°N 61.27°W	UTC-04:00	
TT POS	The Port of Port of Spain	Port of Spain	10.39°N 61.31°W	UTC-04:00	
TT SFE	Port of San Fernando	San Fernando		UTC-04:00	
TT PTF	Port of Point Fortin	Point Fortin		UTC-04:00	
-Venezuela side-
VE	Port of Capure	Capure, Delta Amacuro state	9.98°N 62.255°W	UTC-04:00	
VE GUI	Port of Guiria	Guiria	10.34°N 62.17°W	UTC-04:00	
VE	Port of Irapa	Irapa, Mariño Municipality	10.57°N 62.582°W	UTC+04:00	
VE PDZ	Port of Pedernales	Pedernales, Delta Amacuro state	9.58°N 62.14°W	UTC+04:00	

In addition Oldendorff Carriers has operated a floating facility consisting of two cranes, which has been operating within Trinidadian waters since 2012, for the purpose of transshipment of iron ore from Santana, Brazil to the Middle and the Far East.

== US Naval Base Trinidad ==
During World War II the US Naval Base Trinidad at Chaguaramas played significant roles as the convoy-assembly point transmitting tankers from the Caribbean oil ports across the Atlantic to North Africa and Europe. The Gulf of Paria was used by US carriers and airplanes for their final exercises before going to the Pacific Battleground via the Panama Canal. The planes for the Eighth Army in North Africa were ferried through Trinidad and lastly vessels and civilian planes from South America had to stop at Trinidad for clearance to proceed to North America and European destinations. At its peak it had 135,000 troops on the island.

After protests developed in Trinidad and Tobago over the presence of the base, sustained pressure was placed for the base to be removed and closed. Partial closure was undertaken 1967 and complete closure by 1977.

== See also ==
- Caribbean South America
- Gulf of Paria crossing
- Piracy off the coast of Venezuela
- Voyages of Christopher Columbus#Third voyage (1498–1500)
