= Initiative for the Integration of South American Infrastructure =

- Iniciativa para la Integración de la Infraestructura Regional Suramericana
- Abbreviation: IIRSA
- Formation: September 1, 2000; 26 years ago
- Founded at: Brasília, Brazil
- Type: intergovernmental organization
- Purpose: regional development
- Region served: South America
- Parent organization: South American Council of Infrastructure and Planning (COSIPLAN)
- Website: https://iirsa.org/

The Initiative for the Integration of South American Infrastructure (Spanish: Iniciativa para la Integración de la Infraestructura Regional Suramericana or IIRSA) is a project via which countries of the Andean Community are attempting to further integrate their economies, especially by creating better road infrastructure connecting from Panama City in the north to major cities in South America.

== History ==
IIRSA began as a proposal by Brazilian president Fernando Henrique Cardoso at the First Summit of South American Presidents, which he hosted in Brasília from August 31 to September 1, 2000. It was endorsed by the presidents of all 12 South American countries represented at the summit: Argentina, Bolivia, Brazil, Chile, Colombia, Ecuador, Guyana, Paraguay, Peru, Suriname, Uruguay, and Venezuela.

A new organization, the South American Council of Infrastructure and Planning (COSIPLAN), was established by the Union of South American Nations in August 2009, and IIRSA's Executive Steering Committee was moved under it.

== Structure ==
IIRSA was designed to be consensus-based, with individual national governments making any final decisions. The organization is run by an Executive Steering Committee composed of government ministers, with rotating offices of a president and two vice-presidents. Executive Technical Groups with members from governments, non-governmental organizations, and the private sector are formed on an ad hoc basis to discuss specific issues. A Technical Coordination Committee (CCT) assists with financial and operational matters, and includes members from the Inter-American Development Bank (IDB), Andean Development Corporation (CAF), and the Plata Basin Financial Development Fund (FONPLATA). The CCT is supported by a permanent secretariat in Buenos Aires.

== See also ==
- Plan Puebla Panama
- Free Trade Agreement of the Americas
- Central American Free Trade Agreement
- Plan Puebla Panama
- Trans-Texas Corridor
