= Gulf of Paria crossing =

Proposed transportation link

The Gulf of Paria crossing is a hypothetical bridge or tunnel spanning the Gulf of Paria that would connect the island of Trinidad and South America.

== Background ==
Trinidad was connected to Venezuela (as also with Tobago) during the last ice age by natural "land bridges" between them. Trinidad and Tobago are part of the continental shelf of South America, and Trinidad is, at its closest, only about 11 kilometres (6.8 mi) from the South American mainland. A mere short distance, and visible across the Gulf of Paria on a clear day. At various stages of Trinidad's post independent history, members with the government of the Republic of Trinidad and Tobago have spoken of constructing a physical link between the islands of Trinidad and Tobago to physically unify the country. As public discussion and commentary ensued over feasibility and cost, an alternative proposal was made of constructing a shorter connection which would connect Trinidad and Venezuela.

== Routes ==
- Paria Peninsula (Sucre State), Venezuela—Spanning the Bocas del Dragón (Dragon's Mouths) strait—Isle of Chacachacare, (Bocas Islands) Trinidad.
- Orinoco Delta, (Delta Amacuro), Venezuela—spanning the Boca del Serpiente (Serpent's Mouth) strait -- Icacos Point (Saint Patrick County), Trinidad

== See also ==
- Pan-American Highway (South America)
- Initiative for the Integration of the Regional Infrastructure of South America
- General Rafael Urdaneta Bridge (Venezuela)
- Second Orinoco crossing (Venezuela)
- Confederation Bridge (Prince Edward Island, Canada)
- Bering Strait crossing
- Strait of Gibraltar crossing
- List of longest bridges in the world
- List of longest tunnels
