= Icacos =

Icacos may refer to:

- Icacos Point, Trinidad and Tobago
- Cayo Icacos, a small, uninhabited island off the coast of Fajardo, Puerto Rico
