= Oldendorff Carriers =

Shipping company

Oldendorff Carriers GmbH & Co.
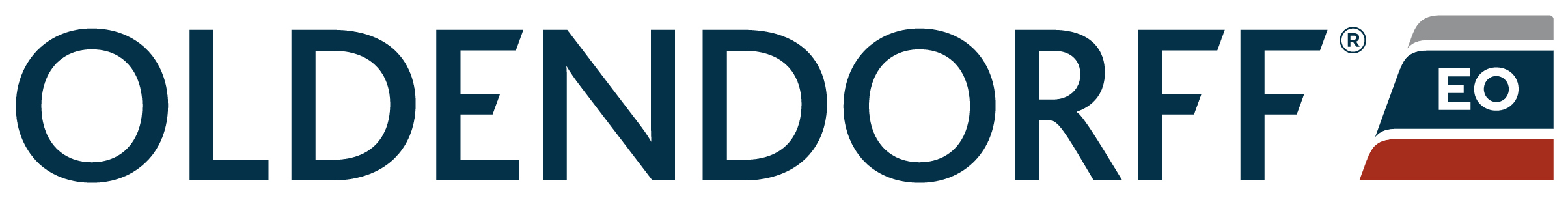
- Company type: Private Company
- Industry: shipping
- Founded: February 1921
- Headquarters: Lübeck, Germany
- Area served: Global
- Key people: Henning Oldendorff (Chairman) Patrick Hutchins (CEO)
- Revenue: about 5 billion US dollars (2014)
- Number of employees: 4000
- Website: www.oldendorff.com

Oldendorff Carriers is a family owned shipping company with headquarters in Lübeck.

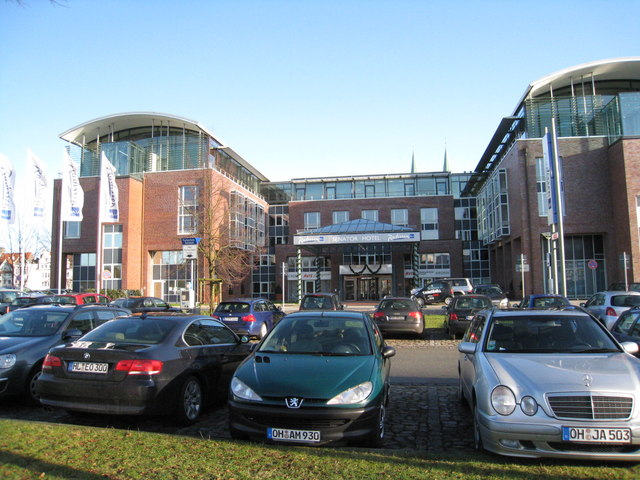
The Lübeck head office above the Senator Hotel - http://geo-en.hlipp.de/photo/7612

Oldendorff Carriers GmbH & Co. KG is the largest German bulk carrier company. It operates around 700 ships, some chartered, with a carrying capacity of approximately 57 million tonnes.

== Company ==
The Oldendorff fleet makes some 14,000 port calls in 60 countries, carrying about 320 million tons of bulk cargo and bulk goods a year. Growth has been rapid since 2005, when 50 million tons was carried.

Oldendorff Carriers is a wholly owned subsidiary of a family holding company, Egon Oldendorff. The headquarters in Lübeck have been on the top floor of the Radisson Blu Senator Hotel since 1999. Around 4,000 employees work for the company, including 210 at the company headquarters, nicknamed "The Dorff", and more than 100 in 17 branch offices in Copenhagen, Hamburg, London, Stamford, Singapore, Mumbai, Melbourne, Shanghai, Tokyo, Vancouver, Cape Town, Santiago, New Amsterdam, Trinidad, Hong Kong, Iskenderun, Dubai, Varna The fleet employs well over 2,000 sailors.

== History ==
On 19 February 1921, 21-year-old Egon Oldendorff joined a small shipping company in Hamburg as a partner, where he trained for nine months. The shipping company was renamed Lilienfeld & Oldendorff and taken over by Oldendorff at the end of the year. The company's first ship was an 870-ton steamer, Planet, built in Rostock in 1881. The company moved to Lübeck in 1925. At the outbreak of World War 2, the company owned 13 ships, but only the Gisela Oldendorff and the Nordmark remained after the war.

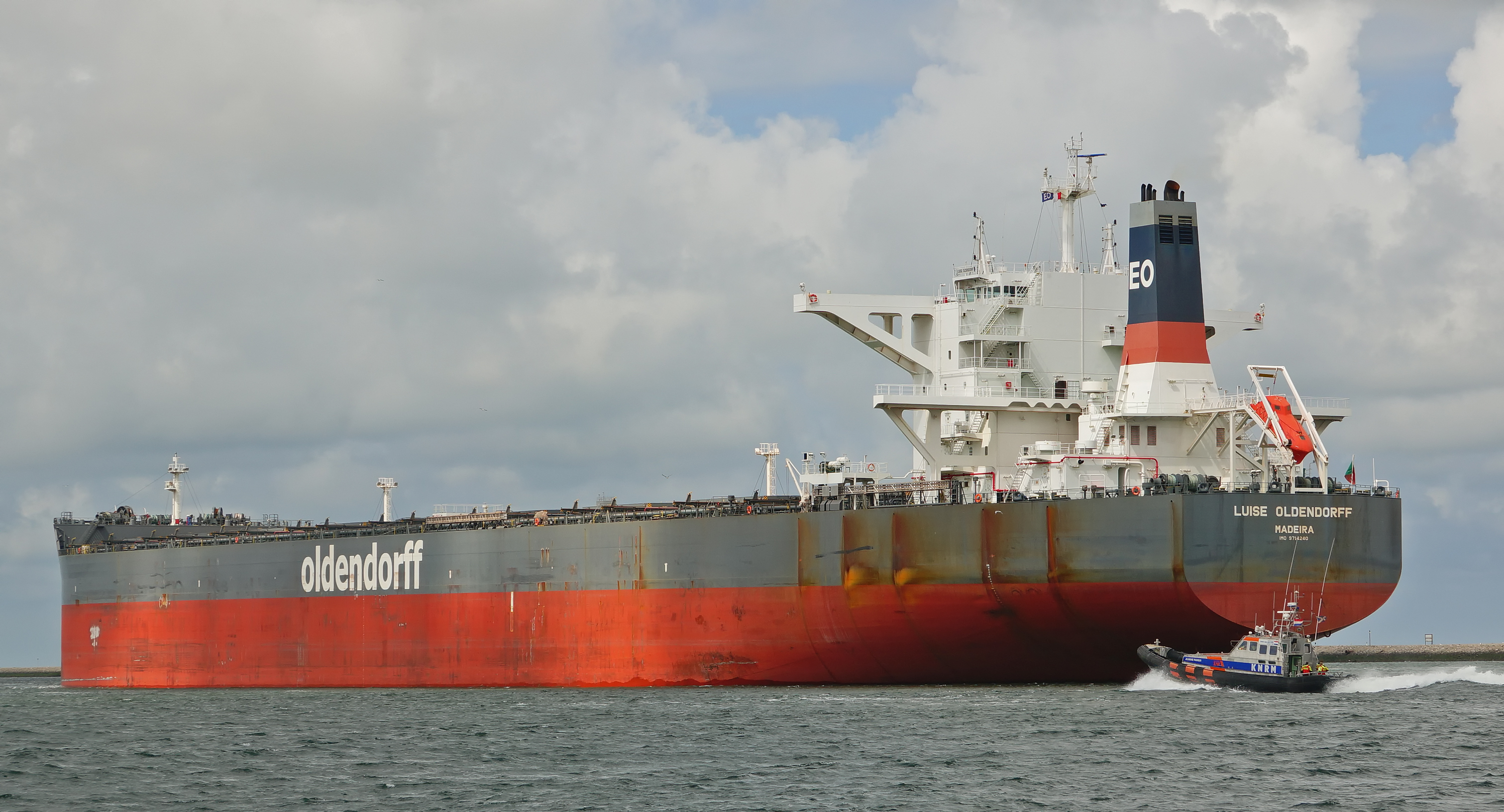
Luise Oldendorff 107,413 gross tons, built 2015 by Hyundai Heavy Industries in Korea

The fleet grew rapidly in the early 1950s due to the Korean War. The operation of bulk carriers started in 1958 with the Baltic Sea timber trade. In 1964, Klaus E. Oldendorff, one of the sons of the company's founder, left to start the shipping company Reederei Nord in Hamburg. In 1980, 23-year-old Henning Oldendorff took over as CEO from his 80-year-old father, who died on May 9, 1984, leaving Henning as the majority shareholder. In 1995 Henning founded another shipping company, Concept Carriers, which merged in January 2001 with the main company to form Oldendorff Carriers. Increasingly the company has been buying its ships from Chinese yards, which it has described as a good experience.

== Transhipment ==
Since starting at Iskenderun in 2001, then Musaffah Port's Emirates Steel from 2007, the company has developed schemes to transfer 30 million tons a year of its cargoes out at sea between large ships and barges at eight ports. The company operates 4 transloaders, 4 floating cranes and 2 transhipment platforms.

== Fleet ==
As at January 2019 the company had 716 ships in service, or under construction, 143 of them owned by the company (OWN) and others as index chartered vessels on floating charter (T/C), or Bareboat charters (B/B). Of those 165 were Capesize, 206 Panamax, 178 Supramax, 111 Handysize and 56 used for transhipment. Total dwt amounted to 60,881,703 and the average age of the fleet was 8 years. The company planned to receive four new ships from Japan's Oshima Shipbuilding in March 2020.

Name	Vessel	Type	DWT	Built	Draft m	LOA m	Beam m	IMO	Flag	Yard	Town	Country
Stella Tess	capesize	T/C	210949	2017	18.62	300	49	9752199	Singapore			
Hull 1452	capesize	T/C	210000	2020	18.55	299.88	50					
Hull 1453	capesize	T/C	210000	2020	18.55	299.88	50					
Hull 1454	capesize	T/C	210000	2020	18.55	299.88	50					
Hull 1455	capesize	T/C	210000	2020	18.55	299.88	50					
Samjohn Odyssey (John Samonas & Sons Ltd)	capesize	T/C	210000	2019	18.4	300	50	9745940	Marshall Is	Cosco	Nantong	China
Samjohn Argonaut (John Samonas & Sons Ltd)	capesize	T/C	209756	2017	18.4	300	50	9745938	Marshall Is			
Hermine Oldendorff	capesize	OWN	209330	2017	18.4	299.95	50	9718375	Portugal	Catic Shipbuilding	Taizhou	China
Hera Oldendorff	capesize	T/C	209249	2017	18.4	299.95	50	9718363	Liberia	Catic Shipbuilding	Taizhou	China
Hermann Oldendorff	capesize	OWN	209242	2016	18.4	299.95	50	9718363	Liberia	Catic Shipbuilding	Taizhou	China
Hans Oldendorff	capesize	OWN	209187	2017	18.4	299.95	50	9718387	Portugal	Catic Shipbuilding	Taizhou	China
Hille Oldendorff	capesize	OWN	209187	2016	18.4	299.95	50	9731573	Portugal	CATIC		China
Helena Oldendorff	capesize	B/B	209176	2016	18.4	299.95	50	9718351	Liberia	Catic Shipbuilding	Taizhou	China
Helga Oldendorff	capesize	OWN	209171	2016	18.4	299.95	50					
Hinrich Oldendorff	capesize	OWN	209113	2016	18.4	299.95	50					
Hubertus Oldendorff	capesize	OWN	209095	2016	18.4	299.95	50					
Henriette Oldendorff	capesize	OWN	209066	2016	18.42	299.95	50					
Fomento Four	capesize	T/C	209000	2019	18.4	299.99	50					
Fomento Three	capesize	T/C	209000	2018	18.4	299.99	50					
Hedwig Oldendorff	capesize	OWN	209000	2018	18.4	299.95	50					
Heide Oldendorff	capesize	OWN	209000	2021								
Henry Oldendorff	capesize	OWN	209000	2020								
Trust Amity	capesize	T/C	209000	2016	18.4	299.95	50					
Hannes Oldendorff	capesize	OWN	208962	2017	18.4	299.95	50					
Hanna Oldendorff	capesize	OWN	208941	2017	18.4	299.95	50					
Margret Oldendorff	capesize	B/B	208086	2014	18.52	299.88	50					
Cape Azalea	capesize	T/C	208025	2012	18.2	300	50					
Marlene Oldendorff	capesize	B/B	208003	2014	18.52	299.88	50					
Aboy Karlie	capesize	T/C	208000	2016	18.5	299.88	50					
Ariadne	capesize	T/C	208000	2016	18.45	300	50					
China Enterprise	capesize	T/C	208000	2017	18.5	299.8	50					
Hagen Oldendorff	capesize	T/C	208000	2020	18.4	299.95	50					
Harry Oldendorff	capesize	T/C	208000	2020	18.4	299.95	50					
Lavinia Oldendorff	capesize	B/B	208000	2014	18.47	299.97	50					
Leopold Oldendorff	capesize	OWN	208000	2015	18.47	299.97	50					
Linda Oldendorff	capesize	OWN	208000	2014	18.47	299.97	50					
Ludolf Oldendorff	capesize	OWN	208000	2015	18.47	299.97	50					
Minoas	capesize	T/C	208000	2015	18.45	300	50					
JMU208 TBN	capesize	T/C	207800	2020	18.4	299.99	50					
Star Sienna	capesize	T/C	207721	2017	18.52	299.88	50					
Hemingway	capesize	VOY	207672	2017	18.5	299.88	50					
Luise Oldendorff	capesize	OWN	207562	2015	18.47	299.97	50					
Lydia Oldendorff	capesize	B/B	207562	2015	18.47	299.97	50					
Fomento Two	capesize	T/C	207000	2017	18.57	300	50					
Fomento One	capesize	T/C	206809	2016	18.59	300	50					
FPMC B Image	capesize	T/C	206699	2012	18.23	299.7	50					
Cape Merlin	capesize	T/C	206312	2005	18.1	299.94	50					
Dan May	capesize	T/C	206125	2012	18.47	299.92	50					
Lan May	capesize	T/C	206125	2011	18.47	299.92	50					
Qing May	capesize	T/C	206125	2012	18.47	299.92	50					
Mina Oldendorff	capesize	B/B	206118	2013	18.49	299.92	50					
May Oldendorff	capesize	B/B	206108	2013	18.49	299.92	50					
Mathilde Oldendorff	capesize	B/B	206080	2013	18.47	299.92	50					
Martha Oldendorff	capesize	B/B	206048	2014	18.49	299.92	50					
Magnus Oldendorff	capesize	B/B	206030	2014	18.49	299.92	50					
Magdalena Oldendorff	capesize	B/B	206010	2013	18.47	299.92	50					
Maran Elegance	capesize	T/C	205938	2014	18.49	299.92	50					
Maran Nobility	capesize	T/C	205938	2013	18.49	299.92	50					
Anangel Courage	capesize	T/C	205888	2013	18.49	299.92	50					
Max Oldendorff	capesize	T/C	205381	2013	18.25	299.92	50					
Mineral Charlie	capesize	T/C	205236	2012	18.39	299.9	50					
Coalmax	capesize	T/C	203100	2013	18.37	299.95	49					
Andros Navigator	capesize	T/C	185805	2006	17.97	290	47					
United Future	capesize	VOY	183230			291.98	45	9816581	Panama	Tadotsu Shipyard		
Coronet	capesize	T/C	182674	2011	18.23	292	45					
Olympic Harmony	capesize	T/C	182631	2016	18.15							
Olympic Hope	capesize	T/C	182631	2016	18.15	292	45					
Aquavictory	capesize	VOY	182060	2010	18.3	292	44.98					
Frontier Phoenix	capesize	T/C	181356	2011	18.24	292	45					
United Breeze	capesize	VOY	181325	2012	18.15	288.93	45	9574236	Panama	Imabari Shipbuilding		
New Delight	capesize	VOY	181279	2012	18.24	291.98	45	9633214	Panama	Imabari Shipbuilding		
Cape Kestrel	capesize	VOY	181267	2016	18.24	291.98	45	9767510	Liberia	Imabari Shipbuilding		
Indian Friendship	capesize	T/C	181125	2013	18.22	292	45					
New Admire	capesize	VOY	181050	2015	18.24	291.98	45					
Indian Partnership	capesize	T/C	181012	2014	18.2	292	45					
Anangel Horizon	capesize	T/C	180940	2016	18.32	292	45					
Southern Cross Dream	capesize	VOY	180694	2011	18.07							
Anangel Virtue	capesize	T/C	180391	2012	18.2	292	45					
Cape Miron	capesize	T/C	180274	2009	18.17	288.93	45					
Nord Steel	capesize	T/C	180230	2007	18.17	288.93	45					
Cape Breeze	capesize	T/C	180203	2010	18.22	292.05	45					
Cape Venture	capesize	T/C	180022	2010	18.22	292.05	45					
Hull No BC180K54	capesize	T/C	180000	2020	18.3	292	45					
Hull No BC180K55	capesize	T/C	180000	2020	18.3	292	45					
YZJ180 TBN	capesize	T/C	180000	2020	18.3	291.5	45					
Mariloula	capesize	T/C	179759	2008	18.22	291.9	45					
KWK Legacy	capesize	T/C	179688	2011	18.22	292	45					
Cape Providence	capesize	VOY	179643	2009	18.22	292	45					
Ioannis	capesize	T/C	179428	2015	18.32	292	45					
Shine On	capesize	T/C	179405	2015	18.32	292	45					
Navios Fulvia	capesize	T/C	179263	2010	18.32	292	45					
New Hydra	capesize	T/C	179258	2011	18.32	292	45					
Navios Etoile	capesize	T/C	179234	2010	18.32	292	45.06					
Maria D	capesize	VOY	179232	2016	18.32	292	45					
Navios Luz	capesize	T/C	179144	2010	18.32	292	45					
William Oldendorff	capesize	OWN	179119	2017	18.33	292	45					
Taurus	capesize	T/C	179067	2011	18.32	292	45					
Amigo II	capesize	VOY	179017	2011	18.32	292	45					
Great Yuan	capesize	VOY	179000	18.22								
E.R. Borneo	capesize	T/C	178979	2010	18.2	292	45					
Knightship	capesize	T/C	178979	2010	18.22	291.97	45					
E.R. Bayonne	capesize	T/C	178978	2010	18.2	291.98	45					
New Elly	capesize	T/C	178928	2012	18.32	292	45					
Lordship	capesize	T/C	178838	2010	18.2	291.96	45					
Quorn	capesize	VOY	178005	1996	18.32	292	45					
China Pride	capesize	T/C	177856	2009	18.32	292	45					
Seamate	capesize	T/C	177775	2010	18.32	292	45					
The Mothership	capesize	VOY	177544	2006	17.98	289	45					
Tai Shan	capesize	VOY	176469	18.3								
Bulk China	capesize	T/C	176274	2005	17.85	289	45					
Berge Triglav	capesize	VOY	175886	2010	18.25	291.8	45					
Golden Zhejiang	capesize	VOY	175837	2010	18.25	291.8	45					
Giuseppe Bottiglieri	capesize	T/C	175243	2011	18.25	291.8	45					
New Elias	capesize	T/C	174222	2007	18.1	288.92	45					
Aquakatie	capesize	T/C	174142	2007	18.12	288.92	45					
Cape Elise	capesize	T/C	174124	2005	18.1	289	45					
Castillo De Valverde	capesize	VOY	173764	2005	18.2	289	45					
Sunlight	capesize	T/C	172572	2000	17.81	289	45					
Cape Orchid	capesize	VOY	172569	2001	17.81	289	45					
Abml Grace	capesize	T/C	172319	2002	17.82	289	45					
Cape Natalie	capesize	VOY	172247	2000	17.72	289	45					
Maran Innovation	capesize	T/C	171681	2004	17.92	289	45					
New Leonidas	capesize	T/C	170578	2003	17.98	289	44.98					
Bluemoon	capesize	T/C	170089	2002	17.63	289	45					
Golden Shui	capesize	T/C	169333	2009	17.82	290.57	45					
Marvellous	capesize	T/C	169226	2000	17.65	288.97	44.98					
Jubilant Glory	babycape	T/C	119406	2013	15.4	245	43.06					
Kitaura	babycape	T/C	119363	2012	15.4	245	43					
Regina Oldendorff	babycape	OWN	118863	2011	14.52	260	43			Sinopacific		
Rixta Oldendorff	babycape	OWN	118863	2011	14.52	260	43			Sinopacific		
Edgar	babycape	T/C	118817	2011	14.5	254	43					
Laura D	babycape	T/C	118817	2012	14.5	254.36	43					
Robert Oldendorff	babycape	OWN	118590	2011	14.5	260	43			Sinopacific		
Richard Oldendorff	babycape	OWN	118532	2011	14.5	260	43			Sinopacific		
Redmer Oldendorff	babycape	OWN	118500	2011	14.5	260	43			Sinopacific		
Rex Oldendorff	babycape	OWN	118500	2011	14.5	260	43			Sinopacific		
Rik Oldendorff	babycape	OWN	118500	2011	14.5	260	43			Sinopacific		
Roland Oldendorff	babycape	OWN	118500	2011	14.5	260	43			Sinopacific		
Eastern Glamour	babycape	T/C	115460	2011	14.5	254	43					
Eastern River	babycape	T/C	115444	2011	14.5	254	43					
Yue Dian 102	babycape	T/C	115169	2012	14.5	254	43					
Yue Dian 103	babycape	T/C	115168	2012	14.52	254	43					
Philipp Oldendorff	babycape	OWN	115156	2012	14.5	254	43			Jiangnan		
He Hua Hai	babycape	T/C	115079	2012	14.5	254	43					
Penelope Oldendorff	babycape	OWN	114861	2010	14.5	255.26	43			New Times		
Orient Centaur	babycape	T/C	114841	2010	14.5	255.26	43					
Peter Oldendorff	babycape	OWN	114840	2012	14.5	255.22	43			New Times		
Pia Oldendorff	babycape	OWN	114775	2013	14.5	255.25	43			New Times		
Patricia Oldendorff	babycape	OWN	114753	2010	14.5	255.26	43					
Orient Cavalier	babycape	T/C	114751	2010	14.5	255.26	43					
Ocean Energy	babycape	T/C	114711	2011	14.5	255.26	43					
Star Zulu	babycape	T/C	114650	2012	14.5	255.26	43					
Glory Energy	babycape	T/C	114600	2010	14.5	255	43					
Mini	babycape	T/C	114563	2012	14.5	255.26	43					
Horizon II	babycape	T/C	114536	2011	14.5	255.26	43					
Evelyn Schulte	babycape	T/C	114475	2012	14.5	254	43					
Evrydiki	babycape	T/C	114167	2010	15	249.88	43					
Anangel Sky	babycape	T/C	114091	2011	15	249.88	43					
Maran Wisdom	babycape	T/C	114091	2014	15	249.88	43					
Idomeneas	babycape	T/C	114062	2010	15	249.88	43					
Maran Progress	babycape	T/C	114048	2014	15	249.88	43					
Anangel Zenith	babycape	T/C	114037	2013	15	249.88	43					
Birte Oldendorff	babycape	OWN	114019	2010	15	249.88	43			Sinopacific		
Jubilant Success	babycape	T/C	110909	2012	14.73	240	43					
AOM Sophie	babycape	T/C	106498	2009	13.47	254.62	43.06					
Diane Oldendorff	post panamax	OWN	100000	2020	14.99	235	38			Oshima		
Dietrich Oldendorff	post panamax	OWN	100000	2020	14.99	235	38			Oshima		
Anglo Marimar	post panamax	T/C	98697	2011	14.48	240	38					
Venus Horizon	post panamax	T/C	95800	2012	14.45	234.9	38					
Double Fortune	post panamax	T/C	95790	2010	14.47	234.98	38					
Sunny Smile	post panamax	T/C	95768	2013	14.47	234.98	38					
CMB Pauillac	post panamax	T/C	95731	2012	14.47	235	38					
Lowlands Rise	post panamax	T/C	95711	2013	14.47	235	38					
CMB Van Mieghem	post panamax	T/C	95707	2011	14.47	235	38					
Catharina Oldendorff	post panamax	OWN	95591	2014	14.47	234.98	38					
Double Miracle	post panamax	T/C	95570	2014	14.47	234.98	38					
KM Hakata	post panamax	T/C	95349	2013	14.42	234.98	38					
Peppino Bottiglieri	post panamax	T/C	93366	2009	14.9	229.2	38					
Piavia	post panamax	T/C	93320	2011	14.9	229.2	38					
Cervia	post panamax	T/C	93311	2010	14.9	229.2	38					
Bottiglieri Sophie Green	post panamax	T/C	93300	2011	14.9	229.2	38					
Elvia	post panamax	T/C	93296	2010	14.9	229.2	38					
Charlotte Oldendorff	post panamax	OWN	93290	2010	14.9	229.2	38					
Bottiglieri Franco Vela	post panamax	T/C	93273	2010	14.9	229.2	38					
John Wulff	post panamax	T/C	93272	2010	14.9	229.2	38					
Antonella Lembo	post panamax	T/C	93270	2011	14.92	229.2	38					
Flag Tom	post panamax	T/C	93268	2011	14.9	229.2	38					
Paola Bottiglieri	post panamax	T/C	93262	2010	14.9	229.2	38					
Bottiglieri Giulio Borriello	post panamax	T/C	93257	2011	14.9	229.2	38					
Cornelie Oldendorff	post panamax	T/C	93246	2011	14.9	229.2	38					
Nana Z	post panamax	T/C	93237	2009	14.9	229.2	38					
Shuang Xi	post panamax	T/C	93237	2010	14.9	229.2	38					
Piet	post panamax	T/C	93183	2011	14.9	229.2	38					
AM Ghent	post panamax	T/C	93167	2011	14.9	229.2	38					
Sicilian Express	post panamax	T/C	93076	2013	14.9	229.89	38.01					
Conrad Oldendorff	post panamax	OWN	93062	2010	14.9	229.2	38					
Christine Oldendorff	post panamax	OWN	93039	2010	14.9	229.5	38					
Dedalos	post panamax	T/C	93038	2010	14.9	229	38.01					
Carl Oldendorff	post panamax	OWN	93028	2011	14.9	229.2	38					
Ocean Topaz	post panamax	T/C	93025	2013	14.9	229.16	38.05					
Cora Oldendorff	post panamax	OWN	93005	2012	14.9	229.2	38					
W-Oslo	post panamax	T/C	92997	2011	14.9	229.2	38					
Junior	post panamax	T/C	92995	2012	14.9	229.2	38					
Siberian Express	post panamax	T/C	92973	2012	14.9	229.89	38.01					
Turmalin	post panamax	T/C	92762	2012	14.92	229.2	38					
Tuerkis	post panamax	T/C	92759	2012	14.92	229.2	38					
Topas	post panamax	T/C	92655	2011	14.92	229.2	38					
Ocean Rhea	post panamax	T/C	92649	2010	14.9	229.25	38					
Michalis L	post panamax	T/C	92025	2010	14.73	229.5	36.92					
Star Piera	post panamax	T/C	91800	2010	14.7	229.5	36.92					
Annou G. O.	post panamax	T/C	87450	2011	14.22	229	36.8					
Athanassios G.O.	post panamax	T/C	87450	2011	14.22	229	36.8					
Constantinos G.O.	post panamax	T/C	87450	2011	14.22	229	36.8					
Sfakia Wave	post panamax	T/C	87340	2011	14.22	229	36.8					
Ateni	post panamax	T/C	87264	2014	14.22	229	36.8					
Alam Permai	post panamax	T/C	87052	2005	14.14	229	36.5					
Captain Mike	post panamax	T/C	87052	2005	14.14	229	36.5					
Nan May	post panamax	T/C	85005	2016	13.97	228.5	36.5					
SBI Samba	post panamax	T/C	84867	2015	14.47	228.95	35					
Tai Kingdom	post panamax	T/C	84703	2017	13.93	228.41	36.5					
Akaki	post panamax	T/C	84075	2013	14.6	235	32.25					
Ledra	post panamax	T/C	83987	2013	14.6	235	32.29					
Yong May	post panamax	T/C	83800	2020	13.94	228.5	36.5					
Zhen May	post panamax	T/C	83800	2021	13.94	228.5	36.5					
Pelagic	kamsarmax	T/C	83617	2008	14.55	229	32.24					
KM Tokyo	kamsarmax	T/C	83483	2010	14.6	229	32.24					
Medi Hong Kong	kamsarmax	T/C	82790	2006	14.43	228.99	32.26					
Densa Flamingo	kamsarmax	T/C	82670	2012	14.5	228.9	32.24					
Bettys Dream	kamsarmax	T/C	82641	2008	14.43	228.99	32.26					
Ellina	kamsarmax	T/C	82612	2008	14.43	228.99	32.26					
Lorient	kamsarmax	T/C	82331	2009	14.43	224.86	32.26					
Alexandra	kamsarmax	T/C	82329	2006	14.43	229	32.26					
Trustn Trader II	kamsarmax	T/C	82293	2015	14.49	228.99	32.26					
MBA Liberty	kamsarmax	T/C	82256	2010	14.43	229	32.26					
Kinoura	kamsarmax	T/C	82250	2012	14.43	228.99	32.26					
Pescadores SW	kamsarmax	T/C	82230	2012	14.43	228.99	32.26					
Golden Jake	kamsarmax	T/C	82188	2011	14.46	229	32.26					
Star Helena	kamsarmax	T/C	82187	2006	14.43	228.99	32.26					
Chorus	kamsarmax	T/C	82181	2011	14.43	228.99	32.26					
Star Trader	kamsarmax	T/C	82181	2010	14.43	228.99	32.26					
Volos	kamsarmax	T/C	82172	2014	14.67	229	32.24					
Bright Pegasus	kamsarmax	T/C	82165	2013	14.43	228.99	32.26					
AOM Gaia	kamsarmax	T/C	82146	2014	14.43	229	32.26					
NBA Monet	kamsarmax	T/C	82099	2012	14.42	229	32.26					
Fraternelle	kamsarmax	T/C	82086	2016	14.45	229	32.26					
Jag Ajay	kamsarmax	T/C	82082	2016	14.45	229	32.26					
Spring Progress	kamsarmax	T/C	82055	2016	14.67	229	32.26					
Darya Shanti	kamsarmax	T/C	82028	2016	14.45	229.01	32.26					
Kaspar Oldendorff	kamsarmax	OWN	82000	2019	14.45	229				Hantong		
Kendra Oldendorff	kamsarmax	OWN	82000	2019	14.45	229				Hantong		
Precious Sky	kamsarmax	T/C	81949	2015	14.43	228.99	32.26					
Zheng Heng	kamsarmax	T/C	81949	2012	14.47	229.02	32.24					
Sea Marathon	kamsarmax	T/C	81945	2015	14.5	229	32.26					
W-Original	kamsarmax	T/C	81939	2012	14.52	229	32.26					
Ultra Cougar	kamsarmax	T/C	81922	2015	14.43	228.99	32.26					
Theresa Shandong	kamsarmax	T/C	81911	2012	14.45	229	32.26					
Rikke	kamsarmax	T/C	81895	2016	14.4	229	32.26					
Sakizaya Respect	kamsarmax	T/C	81858	2018	14.43	228.99	32.26					
Medi Kazahaya	kamsarmax	T/C	81845	2017	14.43	229	32.26					
Indigo Ace	kamsarmax	T/C	81786	2016	14.43	228.99	32.26					
Vishva Jyoti	kamsarmax	T/C	81750	2012	14.45	229	32.26					
Msxt Athena	kamsarmax	T/C	81723	2018	14.52	229	32.26					
Audacity	kamsarmax	T/C	81717	2018	14.43	228.99	32.26					
Ever Grand	kamsarmax	T/C	81688	2013	14.45	229	32.26					
Trabzon	kamsarmax	T/C	81680	2011	14.52	229.07	32.26					
MSXT Oceanus	kamsarmax	T/C	81642	2012	14.52	229.02	32.26					
Sea Pegasus	kamsarmax	T/C	81614	2014	14.45	229	32.26					
Mondial Cosmos	kamsarmax	T/C	81611	2017	14.47	228.9	32.24					
Kai Oldendorff	kamsarmax	OWN	81600	2019	14.45	229						
Katja Oldendorff	kamsarmax	B/B	81600	2020	14.45	229						
Kilian Oldendorff	kamsarmax	B/B	81600	2020	14.45	229						
Kim Oldendorff	kamsarmax	OWN	81600	2019	14.45	229				Hantong		
Kira Oldendorff	kamsarmax	B/B	81600	2020	14.45	229						
Kirsten Oldendorff	kamsarmax	B/B	81600	2020	14.45	229						
Klara Oldendorff	kamsarmax	OWN	81600	2019	14.45	229				Hantong		
Knut Oldendorff	kamsarmax	OWN	81600	2019	14.45	229				Hantong		
Pedhoulas Fighter	kamsarmax	T/C	81600	2012	14.5	229	32.26					
Sakizaya Justice	kamsarmax	T/C	81600	2017	14.5	228.9	32.26					
Stella Belinda	kamsarmax	T/C	81600	2013	14.45	229	32.27					
Yangtze Xing Xiu	kamsarmax	T/C	81600	2013	14.45	229	32.26					
Golden Keen	kamsarmax	T/C	81586	2012	14.52	229.07	32.26					
Adelante	kamsarmax	T/C	81585	2012	14.52	229	32.26					
Beks Yilmaz	kamsarmax	T/C	81547	2012	14.52	229	32.26					
Fiorela	kamsarmax	T/C	81502	2011	14.5	229.02	32.25					
Dragon	kamsarmax	T/C	81500	2012	14.57	229	32.26					
Antwerpia	kamsarmax	T/C	81492	2012	14.5	229	32.26					
Antonia S	kamsarmax	T/C	81462	2014	14.45	229	32.26					
Ocean Saga	kamsarmax	T/C	81449	2015	14.45	229	32.31					
Galio	kamsarmax	T/C	81404	2013	14.45	229	32.26					
Marco	kamsarmax	T/C	81373	2009	14.41	225	32.26					
Aphrodite L	kamsarmax	T/C	81365	2011	14.52	229.02	32.25					
Star Nicole	kamsarmax	T/C	81120	2013	14.48	229	32.26					
Star Virginia	kamsarmax	T/C	81120	2015	14.48	229	32.26					
Antares	kamsarmax	T/C	81118	2015	14.45	229	32.26					
BTG Olympos	kamsarmax	T/C	81086	2015	14.48	229	32.26					
One Energy	kamsarmax	T/C	81076	2011	14.5	229	32.25					
Amazon	kamsarmax	T/C	81017	2019	14.45	229	32.26					
Aom Sveva	kamsarmax	T/C	81000	2019	14.45	228.9	32.24					
Gertrude Oldendorff	kamsarmax	OWN	80959	2016	14.51	229	32.26					
Gebe Oldendorff	kamsarmax	OWN	80943	2016	14.51	229	32.62	9727596	Portugal			
Mondial Iris	kamsarmax	T/C	80890	2017	14.45	228.9	32.24					
Georg Oldendorff	kamsarmax	OWN	80866	2015	14.51	229	32.26					
Gretke Oldendorff	kamsarmax	OWN	80856	2015	14.51	229	32.26					
Gisela Oldendorff	kamsarmax	OWN	80839	2015	14.51	228.97	32.26					
Panagiotis	kamsarmax	T/C	80717	2010	14.45	229	32.24					
New Endeavor	kamsarmax	T/C	80535	2011	14.47	229	32.24					
Stefanos T	kamsarmax	T/C	80499	2011	14.47	229	32.24					
Gerdt Oldendorff	kamsarmax	OWN	80444	2014	14.45	229	32.26					
Cerba	kamsarmax	T/C	80370	2010	14.47	228.96	32.24					
Jag Aditi	kamsarmax	T/C	80325	2011	14.45	229	32.24					
Vishva Vinay	kamsarmax	T/C	80139	2012	14.45	229	32.24					
Orient Union	kamsarmax	T/C	79754	2010	14.58	229	32.26					
Diana Schulte	kamsarmax	T/C	79700	2010	14.62	229	32.22					
Rainbow N	kamsarmax	T/C	79641	2011	14.62	229	32.26					
Dora Schulte	kamsarmax	T/C	79607	2010	14.62	229	32.27					
Captain J. Neofotistos	kamsarmax	T/C	79510	2012	14.62	229	32.26					
New Excellence	kamsarmax	T/C	79449	2014	14.62	229	32.26					
New Explorer	kamsarmax	T/C	79448	2014	14.62	229	32.26					
New Venture	kamsarmax	T/C	79415	2014	14.62	229	32.26					
Black Pearl	panamax	T/C	78890	2012	14.58	229	32.6					
Blue Bosporus	panamax	T/C	78819	2008	14.38	225	32.28					
Lake Dahlia	panamax	T/C	78802	2009	14.38	225	32.24					
Spring Warbler	panamax	T/C	78400	2012	14.44	225	32.24					
New Pioneer	panamax	T/C	77229	2002	14.27	225	32.2					
Theodor Oldendorff	panamax	OWN	77171	2008	14.19	225	32.26					
Francesco Corrado	panamax	T/C	77061	2008	14.2	225	32.26					
Thor	panamax	T/C	76838	2005	14.13	225	32.26					
ADS Arendal	panamax	T/C	76830	2004	14.22	225	32.2					
Harrow	panamax	T/C	76752	2005	14.22	225	32.2					
Rosali	panamax	T/C	76728	2005	14.22	225	32.2					
Blessed Luck	panamax	T/C	76704	2004	14.22	225	32.2					
Toro	panamax	T/C	76636	2008	14.14	224.94	32.26					
Imperial Rose	panamax	T/C	76619	2008	14.14	224.94	32.26					
KM Imabari	panamax	T/C	76619	2009	14.14	224.94	32.26					
Real Happiness	panamax	T/C	76602	2005	14.14	224.94	32.26					
Nord Fortune	panamax	T/C	76596	2008	14.14	224.94	32.26					
Genco Thunder	panamax	T/C	76588	2007	14.22	225	32.26					
Chris	panamax	T/C	76500	2006	14.11	225	32.26					
Maribella	panamax	T/C	76500	2004	14.11	225	32.26					
Kenta	panamax	T/C	76487	2010	14.14	224.94	32.26					
Federal SW	panamax	T/C	76483	2011	14.12	225	32.26					
Modest SW	panamax	T/C	76483	2012	14.09	225	32.26					
Eirini P.	panamax	T/C	76466	2004	14.03	225	32.26					
Vamos	panamax	T/C	76466	2004	14.03	225	32.26					
Magic P	panamax	T/C	76453	2004	14.03	225	32.26					
Penta	panamax	T/C	76424	2011	14.12	225	32.26					
Argolis	panamax	T/C	76263	2005	14.03	225	32.26					
Pabur	panamax	T/C	76167	2012	14.11	224.96	32.26					
Pabal	panamax	T/C	76118	2012	14.11	224.98	32.26					
Prodigy	panamax	T/C	76117	2013	14.2	225	32.26					
Ningbo Seal	panamax	T/C	76048	2011	14.27	224.98	32.26					
Ningbo Sea Lion	panamax	T/C	76000	2013	14.27	225	32.26					
Agios Sostis	panamax	T/C	75659	2009	14.2	225	32.26					
Starlight	panamax	T/C	75611	2004	13.99	225	32.26					
Yasa Unity	panamax	T/C	75580	2006	13.99	225	32.26					
City of Dubrovnik	panamax	OWN	75460	1995	14.31	225	32.24					
Indian Goodwill	panamax	T/C	75404	2014	13.95	225	32.24					
Indian Harmony	panamax	T/C	75385	2013	13.95	225	32.24					
Indian Solidarity	panamax	T/C	75384	2014	13.95	225	32.24					
Nestor	panamax	T/C	75066	2011	14.2	225	32.26					
Efrossini	panamax	T/C	75000	2012	14.12	225	32.2					
Trina Oldendorff	panamax	OWN	74600	2013	14.22	225	32.26					
Iolcos Unity	panamax	T/C	74476	2006	14.27	225	32.26					
Underdog	panamax	T/C	74444	2006	14.27	225	32.26					
Evangelia	panamax	T/C	74381	2000	13.82	225	32.24					
Little Prince	panamax	T/C	74133	2001	13.96	225	32.2					
Very Maria	panamax	T/C	73910	2001	13.96	224.89	32.2					
Bonanza	panamax	T/C	73613	2003	14.02	225	32.26					
Bulk Patriot	panamax	VOY	70153	13.29								
Sophie Oldendorff	panamax	OWN	70038	2000	14.42	225	32.2					
Harmen Oldendorff	panamax	OWN	66188	2005	13.83	224.9	32.2					
Sorsi	ultramax	T/C	64043	2017	13.32	199.9	32.26					
Ultralaz	ultramax	T/C	64000	2018	13.32	200	32.26					
Nautical Marie	ultramax	T/C	63800	2015	13.3	199.9	32.26					
CL Judy	ultramax	T/C	63656	2017	13.3	199.9	32.26					
CL Lindy	ultramax	T/C	63656	2017	13.3	199.9	32.26					
CL Kate	ultramax	T/C	63607	2017	13.3	194.78	32.26					
CL Teresa	ultramax	T/C	63606	2018	13.3	199.9	32.26					
Beks Ceyda	ultramax	T/C	63592	2015	13.3	199.99	32.25					
Ocean Tianbo	ultramax	T/C	63579	2015	13.3	199.9	32.26					
CL Heidi	ultramax	T/C	63572	2016	13.3	199.9	32.26					
CL Iris	ultramax	T/C	63572	2016	13.3	199.9	32.26					
Nicon Fortune	ultramax	T/C	63562	2019	13.42	199.9	32.24					
SSI Splendid	ultramax	T/C	63553	2019	13.27	199.99	32.26					
Young Glory	ultramax	T/C	63547	2015	13.32	206.06	32.26					
CP Tianjin	ultramax	T/C	63541	2016	13.3	199.9	32.25					
Glafkos	ultramax	T/C	63519	2016	13.3	199.9	32.26					
Iolaos	ultramax	T/C	63519	2016	13.3	199.9	32.26					
Mila	ultramax	T/C	63519	2018	13.42	199.98	32.24					
Snowy	ultramax	T/C	63516	2015	13.3	199.9	32.26					
Clipper Imabari	ultramax	T/C	63504	2017	13.42	199.9	32.24					
CL Gemma	ultramax	T/C	63490	2016	13.3	199	32.26					
Ultra Dedication	ultramax	T/C	63490	2018	13.42	199.98	32.24					
Leto	ultramax	T/C	63485	2015	13.3	199.9	32.26					
Kiran Adriatic	ultramax	T/C	63477	2014	13.3	199.9	32.26					
Nefeli	ultramax	T/C	63466	2016	13.3	199.9	32.26					
Menelaos	ultramax	T/C	63458	2015	13.3	199.9	32.26					
CL Fair	ultramax	T/C	63452	2015	13.3	199	32.26					
Aeolos	ultramax	T/C	63434	2015	13.32	199.9	32.26					
New Dedication	ultramax	T/C	63434	2018	13.42	199.9	32.24					
Summer Sky	ultramax	T/C	63415	2017	13.63	199.98	32.24					
Emperor	ultramax	T/C	63411	2015	13.3	199.9	32.26					
Bulk Polaris	ultramax	T/C	63396	2017	13.42	199.98	32.24					
KM London	ultramax	T/C	63386	2017	13.42	199.98	32.24					
Oceanus	ultramax	T/C	63385	2014	13.3	199.9	32.26					
GH Urban Sea	ultramax	T/C	63368	2017	13.3	199.9	32.26					
Aeriko	ultramax	T/C	63355	2013	13.3	199.99	32.26					
Doric Shogun	ultramax	T/C	63347	2016	13.42	199.98	32.24					
SBI Phoebe	ultramax	T/C	63275	2016	13.3	199.9	32.26					
Clipper Kythira	ultramax	T/C	63273	2015	13.3	199.9	32.26					
Sinica Graeca	ultramax	T/C	63270	2015	13.3	199.99	32.26					
Sunrise Jade	ultramax	T/C	63243	2015	13.3	199.9	32.26					
Oslo Venture	ultramax	T/C	63234	2015	13.3	199.9	32.26					
Sinop	ultramax	T/C	63200	2013	13.3	199.99	32.26					
Giants Causeway	ultramax	T/C	63197	2015	13.3	199.99	32.26					
Common Galaxy	ultramax	T/C	63173	2015	13.3	199.9	32.26					
Dionysus	ultramax	T/C	63158	2015	13.3	199.9	32.26					
Skywalker	ultramax	T/C	63056	2015	13.3	199.9	32.26					
Sarika Naree	ultramax	T/C	63023	2015	13.3	199.9	32.26					
Savitree Naree	ultramax	T/C	63016	2016	13.3	199.9	32.26					
Asia Ruby IV	ultramax	T/C	62996	2014	13.3	199	32.26					
Searider	ultramax	T/C	62690	2015	13.3	199.99	32.3					
Nord Biscay	ultramax	T/C	62625	2019	13.36	199.95	32.3					
Benjamin Oldendorff	ultramax	OWN	62150	2020	13.31	200				Oshima		
Britta Oldendorff	ultramax	OWN	62150	2020	13.31	200				Oshima		
Beate Oldendorff	ultramax	OWN	62100	2020	13.31	200	32.26			Oshima		
Jan Oldendorff	ultramax	OWN	61606	2019	13.03	199.9	32.24			Cosco / Kawasaki JV	Nantong	
Great 61	ultramax	T/C	61580	2015	13.02	199.9	32.24					
Shiny Halo	ultramax	T/C	61496	2011	13.01	199.98	32.24					
Soho Mandate	ultramax	T/C	61436	2016	13.03	199.99	32.24					
CL Belle	ultramax	T/C	61411	2014	13	199.9	32.24					
Navios La Paix	ultramax	T/C	61400	2014	13	199.9	32.24					
CL Alice	ultramax	T/C	61392	2014	13.01	199.98	32.24					
Belforest	ultramax	T/C	61320	2015	13.01	199.98	32.24					
SSI Triumph	ultramax	T/C	61236	2014	13.01	199.9	32.24					
CL Edi	ultramax	T/C	61205	2014	13.04	199.9	32.24					
CL Daisy	ultramax	T/C	61114	2014	13.03	199.9	32.24					
CL Christina	ultramax	T/C	61097	2014	13.03	199.9	32.24					
Captain Haddock	ultramax	T/C	61094	2019	13.02	199.9	32.24					
Alwine Oldendorff	ultramax	OWN	61090	2014	13.06	198	32.26					
August Oldendorff	ultramax	OWN	61090	2015	13.06	198	32.26					
Bulk Atacama	ultramax	T/C	61000	2014	13	199.99	32.24					
Jacob Oldendorff	ultramax	OWN	61000	2019	13.03	199.9	32.24			Cosco / Kawasaki JV	Dalian	China
Jens Oldendorff	ultramax	OWN	61000	2019	199.9	13				Cosco / Kawasaki JV	Dalian	China
John Oldendorff	ultramax	OWN	61000	2019	13	199.9				Cosco / Kawasaki JV	Nantong	China
Jonas Oldendorff	ultramax	OWN	61000	2019	199.9	13				Cosco / Kawasaki JV	Dalian	China
Julius Oldendorff	ultramax	OWN	61000	2019	13	199.9				Cosco / Kawasaki JV	Nantong	China
ST-Cergue	ultramax	T/C	60696	2017	13.04	198	32.26					
Amstel Lion	ultramax	T/C	60454	2016	12.95	199.99	32.26					
Phoenix Rising	ultramax	T/C	60417	2015	12.95	199.99	32.29					
STH Montreal	ultramax	T/C	60362	2018	12.95	199.99	32.25					
Orient Arrow	ultramax	T/C	60293	2017	12.94	198	32.26					
Golden Cecilie	ultramax	T/C	60263	2015	12.94	198	32.26					
African Turaco	ultramax	T/C	60075	2016	13.02	199.9	32.31					
Emmanuel C	supramax	T/C	58837	2008	12.83	189.99	32.26					
Leon Oetker	supramax	T/C	58790	2008	12.82	190	32.26					
Liberty	supramax	T/C	58790	2009	12.82	190	32.26					
Densa Dolphin	supramax	T/C	58772	2010	12.83	189.99	32.26					
Indigo Flora	supramax	T/C	58724	2013	12.68	197	32.26					
Seagull	supramax	T/C	58609	2010	13.02	196	32.26					
Asiatic	supramax	T/C	58519	2012	13.02	196	32.3					
Aliki Force	supramax	T/C	58419	2011	13.02	196	32.26					
Bomar Amber	supramax	T/C	58110	2012	12.83	189.99	32.26					
Darya Noor	supramax	T/C	58110	2011	12.83	189.99	32.26					
Amis Leader	supramax	T/C	58107	2010	12.83	189.99	32.26					
Doric Victory	supramax	T/C	58091	2010	12.83	189.99	32.26					
Vinayak	supramax	T/C	58089	2009	12.83	189.99	32.26					
Teresa Oetker	supramax	T/C	58018	2010	12.95	189.99	32.26					
St George	supramax	T/C	58000	2012	12.8	189.99	32.26					
Alis	supramax	T/C	57981	2013	12.95	189.99	32.26					
Thetis	supramax	T/C	57981	2013	12.95	189.99	32.26					
Frederike Oldendorff	supramax	OWN	57887	2017	13.02	189.99	32.26					
Bulk Carina	supramax	T/C	57819	2016	12.83	189.99	32.26					
Petrel Bulker	supramax	T/C	57809	2011	12.95	189.99	32.26					
Sandpiper Bulker	supramax	T/C	57809	2011	12.95	189.99	32.26					
Densa Jaguar	supramax	T/C	57637	2012	13	190	32.26					
Desert Spring	supramax	T/C	57409	2012	13.02	193.07	32.26					
Beks Cenk	supramax	T/C	57399	2012	13	190	32.26					
Beks Halil	supramax	T/C	57381	2011	13	190	32.26					
Beks Nazik	supramax	T/C	57347	2012	13	190	32.26					
Zealand Amsterdam	supramax	T/C	57171	2012	13	190	32.26					
Zealand Almere	supramax	T/C	57157	2012	13	190	32.26					
Bravo V	supramax	T/C	56940	2010	12.82	189.99	32.26					
Seapace	supramax	T/C	56894	2010	12.8	189.99	32.26					
Pintail	supramax	T/C	56880	2011	12.8	189.99	32.26					
Nasco Jade	supramax	T/C	56860	2010	12.8	189.99	32.26					
Scoter	supramax	T/C	56837	2012	12.8	189.99	32.26					
Vega Taurus	supramax	T/C	56803	2010	12.8	189.99	32.26					
Daxia	supramax	T/C	56800	2011	12.8	189.99	32.26					
Universal Baltimore	supramax	T/C	56791	2011	12.8	189.99	32.26					
Blue Fin	supramax	T/C	56780	2011	12.8	189.9	32.26					
Mandarin Glory	supramax	T/C	56780	2009	12.8	189.99	32.26					
Yellow Fin	supramax	T/C	56780	2011	12.8	189.9	32.26					
Mandarin Phoenix	supramax	T/C	56778	2011	12.8	189.99	32.26					
Red Fin	supramax	T/C	56773	2011	12.8	189.9	32.26					
Aragonit	supramax	T/C	56758	2012	12.8	189.99	32.26					
Klima	supramax	T/C	56752	2013	12.8	189.99	32.26					
Universal Barcelona	supramax	T/C	56729	2011	12.8	189.9	32.26					
Mandarin Singapore	supramax	T/C	56723	2011	12.8	189.99	32.26					
Shanghai Bulker	supramax	T/C	56719	2012	12.8	189.99	32.26					
Mandarin Grace	supramax	T/C	56693	2011	12.8	189.99	32.26					
Serenitas N	supramax	T/C	56645	2011	12.8	189.99	32.26					
Vishva Vijeta	supramax	T/C	56645	2011	12.8	189.99	32.26					
Sea Star	supramax	T/C	56591	2014	12.8	189.99	32.26					
Chios Sunrise	supramax	T/C	56589	2013	12.8	189.99	32.26					
Diva	supramax	T/C	56582	2011	12.8	189.99	32.26					
Aquarius Honor	supramax	T/C	56564	2011	12.8	189.99	32.26					
Nordic Tianjin	supramax	T/C	56517	2012	12.8	189.99	32.26					
Sunrise Rainbow	supramax	T/C	56415	2012	12.8	189.99	32.27					
Ikan Seligi	supramax	T/C	56236	2010	12.72	189.99	32.25					
Orchid Halo	supramax	T/C	56174	2012	12.72	189.99	32.25					
Bulk Orion	supramax	T/C	56155	2011	12.72	189.99	32.25					
Mykali	supramax	VOY	56132	2011	12.72	189.88	32.25					
Medi Okinawa	supramax	T/C	56118	2011	12.72	189.99	32.26					
Green Phoenix	supramax	T/C	56116	2011	12.72	189.99	32.25					
Pacific Integrity	supramax	T/C	56100	2013	12.72	189.99	32.25					
Feronia	supramax	T/C	56058	2007	12.57	189.99	32.26					
Ocean Phoenix	supramax	T/C	56013	2009	12.72	189.99	32.25					
Yasa Aysen	supramax	T/C	55905	2007	12.57	189.99	32.26					
Vienna Wood N	supramax	T/C	55768	2011	12.73	190	32.26					
Glovis Maria	supramax	T/C	55705	2012	12.87	187.88	32.26					
Glovis Melody	supramax	T/C	55705	2012	12.87	187.88	32.26					
SSI Majestic	supramax	T/C	55694	2010	12.57	189.99	32.26					
New Liulinhai	supramax	T/C	55676	2004	12.52	189.99	32.26					
Anna-Maria	supramax	T/C	55664	2007	12.56	189.9	32.26					
E.R. Bristol	supramax	T/C	55659	2011	12.85	187.88	32.36					
E.R. Bordeaux	supramax	T/C	55621	2011	12.87	187.88	32.26					
Aruna Hulya	supramax	T/C	55582	2012	12.85	187.88	32.26					
Neraida	supramax	T/C	55567	2005	12.49	189.99	32.26					
Aruna Ece	supramax	T/C	55506	2012	12.85	187.88	32.26					
Aruna Ismail	supramax	T/C	55484	2013	12.85	187.88	32.26					
Amis Fortune	supramax	T/C	55468	2015	12.53	189.9	32.26					
Orient Iris	supramax	T/C	55464	2014	12.5	189.9	32.26					
Yasa Canary	supramax	T/C	55431	2013	12.87	187.88	32.26					
Peterborough	supramax	T/C	55414	2009	12.85	187.88	32.26					
Genco Picardy	supramax	T/C	55407	2005	12.52	189.99	32.26					
Wikanda Naree	supramax	T/C	53857	2013	12.62	190	32.26					
Zografia	supramax	T/C	53733	2002	12.49	189.99	32.26					
Blue Diamond	supramax	T/C	53648	2008	12.62	190	32.26					
Red Diamond	supramax	T/C	53648	2011	12.62	190	32.26					
Eolus	supramax	T/C	53429	2009	12.49	189.99	32.26					
Florinda I	supramax	T/C	52498	2005	12.02	189.99	32.26					
Nika	supramax	T/C	52454	2003	12.02	189.99	32.26					
Oktem Aksoy	supramax	T/C	52441	2003	12.02	189.99	32.26					
Diva Eva	supramax	T/C	52415	2006	12.02	189.99	32.26					
Seven Lady	supramax	T/C	51241	2009	12.33	182.98	32.26					
Sinoway VI	supramax	T/C	51008	2002	11.92	189.99	32.26					
Alice Oldendorff	supramax	OWN	50259	2000	12.17	189.9	32.2					
Pretty Lady	supramax	T/C	50169	2001	11.93	189.8	32.26					
Kiana	handysize	T/C	45874	1997	11.5	188.33	31					
Beira	handysize	T/C	40047	2017	10.72	179.84	32.01					
Rubina	handysize	T/C	39958	2018	10.75	179.93	31.99					
Strategic Alliance	handysize	T/C	39848	2014	10.5	179.99	30					
Shan Hu Hai	handysize	T/C	39765	2016	10.52	179.99	30					
Cielo Di Cartagena	handysize	T/C	39202	2015	10.5	179.99	30					
Cielo Di Valparaiso	handysize	T/C	39202	2015	10.5	179.99	30					
Solidarnosc	handysize	T/C	39071	2018	10.5	179.99	30					
Orawa	handysize	T/C	38981	2009	10.58	189.99	28.5					
Jinling Confidence	handysize	T/C	38971	2017	10.52	179.95	32					
Wadowice II	handysize	T/C	38967	2010	10.6	189.99	28.5					
TS Echo	handysize	T/C	38863	2016	10.52	182	30					
TS Index	handysize	T/C	38863	2018	10.52	182	30					
TS Flower	handysize	T/C	38852	2017	10.52	182	30					
TS Honour	handysize	T/C	38806	2017	10.52	182	30					
Interlink Quality	handysize	T/C	38717	2016	10.5	179.95	32					
Vanessa Oldendorff	handysize	OWN	38695	2015	10.12	183	30.6					
Edward Oldendorff	handysize	OWN	38691	2015	10.5	179.99	30.05					
Eibe Oldendorff	handysize	OWN	38680	2015	10.5	179.99	29.99					
Interlink Amenity	handysize	T/C	38680	2018	10.5	179.95	32					
Emma Oldendorff	handysize	OWN	38649	2014	10.5	179.99	30.01	9676606	Malta			
Eckert Oldendorff	handysize	OWN	38631	2014	10.5	179.99	30.05					
Edwine Oldendorff	handysize	OWN	38617	2016	10.5	179.99	30					
Erna Oldendorff	handysize	OWN	38613	2016	10.5	179.99	30					
Elisabeth Oldendorff	handysize	OWN	38601	2015	10.5	179.99	30					
Ernst Oldendorff	handysize	OWN	38599	2015	10.5	179.99	30					
Elsa Oldendorff	handysize	OWN	38591	2015	10.5	179.99	30.05					
Nordtajo	handysize	T/C	38541	2017	10.5	179.95	32					
Edgar Oldendorff	handysize	OWN	38521	2017	10.52	179.99	30.05					
Eike Oldendorff	handysize	OWN	38520	2017	10.5	179.99	30					
Ken Voyager	handysize	T/C	38429	2012	10.36	183	29.5					
Glorieuse	handysize	T/C	38338	2012	10.02	183	30.6					
Glorious Fuji	handysize	T/C	38180	2013	10.54	179.97	29.8					
Dorthe Oldendorff	handysize	OWN	38000	2019	10.87	181.7	30			Huahai	Beihai	
Green Gem	handysize	T/C	38000	2018	10.46	179.9	31					
Sea Breeze	handysize	T/C	37983	2016	10.62	181	30					
Broadgate	handysize	T/C	37949	2017	10.54	179.97	29.8					
Lily Oldendorff	handysize	OWN	37913	2017	10.62	181	30					
Rook	handysize	T/C	37851	2010	10.43	189.99	28.5					
Bulk Trader	handysize	OWN	37846	2018	10.62	181	30					
Western Boheme	handysize	T/C	37452	2012	10.42	186.96	28.6					
Western Tosca	handysize	T/C	37452	2013	10.42	186.96	28.6					
Alcyone	handysize	T/C	37388	2017	10.62	181	30					
Atlantis Trade	handysize	T/C	37226	2013	10.5	189.99	28.31					
Nordloire	handysize	T/C	37212	2013	10.5	189.99	28.3					
Seas 11	handysize	T/C	37202	2013	10.5	189.9	28.31					
Team Hope	handysize	T/C	37196	2012	11	186.4	27.8					
New Commander	handysize	T/C	37187	2012	11	186.4	27.8					
Sea Falcon	handysize	T/C	37151	2017	10.62	181.16	30					
Interlink Levity	handysize	T/C	37135	2014	10.4	189.99	28.5					
Ocean Echo	handysize	T/C	37084	2013	10.87	177.85	28.6					
Interlink Equity	handysize	T/C	37070	2013	10.4	189.99	28.5					
Ikan Leban	handysize	T/C	37059	2014	10.87	177.85	28.6					
Arrilah-I	handysize	T/C	36863	2011	10.92	186.4	27.8					
Shah	handysize	T/C	36863	2010	10.92	186.4	27.84					
Densa Seal	handysize	T/C	36794	2013	10.92	186.4	27.8					
Densa Falcon	handysize	T/C	36765	2013	10.92	186.4	27.8					
Densa Cheetah	handysize	T/C	36748	2013	10.92	186.4	27.8					
Densa Puma	handysize	T/C	36722	2013	10.92	186.4	27.8					
Alam Setia	handysize	T/C	36320	2013	10.72	176.5	28.8					
Hansa Baltica	handysize	OWN	36000	2019	10.2	181.7	30					
Midland Trader	handysize	OWN	36000	2019	10.2	181.7	30					
Spring Breeze	handysize	T/C	36000	2012	10.7	176.5	28.8					
Dragonera	handysize	T/C	35735	2011	10.32	180	30					
KS Flora	handysize	T/C	35678	2015	9.93	176.99	30					
Melbourne Spirit	handysize	T/C	35572	2013	10	179.9	30					
Pretty Team	handysize	T/C	35200	2013	10.1	179.88	29.8					
Maryam D	handysize	T/C	35093	2016	10.1	179.99	30					
Merel D	handysize	T/C	35093	2016	10.1	179.93	30					
Ithaca Riga	handysize	T/C	35052	2010	10.8	179.9	28.4					
Ben Rinnes	handysize	T/C	35016	2015	10.1	180	30					
Handy Stranger	handysize	T/C	34753	2014	10.02	182	30					
Sirius	handysize	T/C	34537	2011	9.92	180	30					
Baltic Cove	handysize	T/C	34402	2010	9.92	180	30					
Zambesi	handysize	T/C	34204	2013	10.1	180	30					
Just Fitz III	handysize	T/C	33663	2010	9.82	180	30					
Eos Victory	handysize	T/C	33451	2012	10.1	179.99	28.2					
Centurius	handysize	T/C	33367	2015	10.1	179.99	28.2					
Regius	handysize	T/C	33367	2016	10.1	179.99	28.2					
Pan Kristine	handysize	T/C	33302	2011	9.82	178.9	28.8					
Outrider	handysize	T/C	33190	2016	10.02	179.93	28.4					
Dora Oldendorff	handysize	OWN	33107	2010	10.18	177.4	28.2					
Dorothea Oldendorff	handysize	OWN	33013	2009	10.2	177.4	28.24					
Federal Kushiro	handysize	T/C	32762	2004	10.67	190.43	23.6					
Sentosa Bulker	handysize	T/C	32740	2010	10.15	179.9	28.4					
CMB Adrien	handysize	T/C	32663	2011	10.17	179.9	28.4					
CMB Catrine	handysize	T/C	32618	2012	10.17	179.9	28.4					
MS Charm	handysize	T/C	32527	2010	10.2	177.4	28.2					
IVS Orchard	handysize	T/C	32525	2011	10.17	179.9	28.4					
Lucy Oldendorff	handysize	OWN	32449	2011	10.14	179.9	28.4					
IVS Triview	handysize	T/C	32282	2009	10.02	177.13	28.4					
Auckland Spirit	handysize	OWN	32262	2003	10.57	171.59	27.05					
Singapore Spirit	handysize	OWN	32259	2002	10.57	171.59	27					
Admiralty Spirit	handysize	OWN	32189	2004	10.55	171.59	27.05					
TBC Prestige	handysize	T/C	31966	2014	10	176.5	27					
Ikan Jerung	handysize	T/C	31760	2009	10.42	171.6	27					
Straits Breeze	handysize	T/C	31612	2009	10.42	171.59	27					
Clipper Triumph	handysize	T/C	30442	2009	9.81	178.9	28					
Uni Wealth	handysize	T/C	29255	2009	10.06	169.99	27					
Doniambo	handysize	T/C	28428	2007	9.88	161	26					
Meritius	handysize	T/C	28417	2009	9.82	169.37	27.2					
Nord Tokyo	handysize	T/C	28343	2009	9.82	169.37	27.23					
AC Sesoda	handysize	T/C	28306	2008	9.82	169.37	27.24					
Stargate	handysize	T/C	28221	2011	9.82	169.37	27.2					
Cherry Island	handysize	T/C	28220	2014	9.82	169.37	27.2					
Crystal Island	handysize	T/C	28220	2011	9.82	169.37	27.2					
Occitan Sky	handysize	T/C	27082	2004	9.69	178.43	26					
Tao Ace	handysize	T/C	25037	2013	10	158.15	24					
Lynx	handysize	T/C	23003	2009	9.8	159.61	24.4					
Lita	handysize	T/C	18305	1995	9.12	148.17	22.8					
Thorco Luna	handysize	VOY	16949	2014	6.62	131.66	23					
Alfred Oldendorff	transloader	OWN	93682	2015	14.5	235	38.01					
Antonie Oldendorff	transloader	OWN	93682	2015	14.5	235	38.01					
Anna Oldendorff	transloader	OWN	88266	2006	13.82	229.93	38					
Johanna Oldendorff	transloader	OWN	67547	1998	13.26	225	32.2					
Lena	platform	OWN	3000	2012	3.8	91	24					
Maggie	floating crane	OWN	5000	2006	3.6	90	24					
Marcus	floating crane	OWN	3000	2012	3.1	50	24.57					
Max	floating crane	OWN	3000	2012	3.1	50	24.57					
Mia	floating crane	OWN	3000	1995	3.7	46	24					
Eagle	barge	OWN	13400	2007	5	130	27.5					
Falcon	barge	OWN	13400	2008	5	130	27.5					
Hawk	barge	OWN	13400	2009	5	130	27.5					
Osprey	barge	OWN	13400	2015	5	130	27.5					
Arkad 4	barge	B/B	10546	1999	5.2	120.8	26.6					
Arkad 5	barge	B/B	10546	1999	5.2	120.8	26.6					
Aroiama 11	barge	OWN	4000	2006	4.1	93.5	11.45					
Aroiama 12	barge	OWN	4000	2006	4.1	93.5	11.45					
Aroiama 13	barge	OWN	4000	2006	4.1	93.5	11.45					
Aroiama 14	barge	OWN	4000	2006	4.1	93.5	11.45					
Aroiama 15	barge	OWN	4000	2006	4.1	93.5	11.45					
Aroiama 16	barge	OWN	4000	2006	4.1	93.5	11.45					
Aroiama 17	barge	OWN	4000	2006	4.1	93.5	11.45					
Aroiama 18	barge	OWN	4000	2006	4.1	93.5	11.45					
Aroiama 19	barge	OWN	4000	2006	4.1	93.5	11.45					
Aroiama 20	barge	OWN	4000	2006	4.1	93.5	11.45					
Hururu 1	barge	OWN	4000	2006	4.1	93.5	11.45					
Hururu 10	barge	OWN	4000	2006	4.1	93.5	11.45					
Hururu 2	barge	OWN	4000	2006	4.1	93.5	11.45					
Hururu 3	barge	OWN	4000	2006	4.1	93.5	11.46					
Hururu 4	barge	OWN	4000	2006	4.1	93.5	11.45					
Hururu 5	barge	OWN	4000	2006	4.1	93.5	11.45					
Hururu 6	barge	OWN	4000	2006	4.1	93.5	11.45					
Hururu 7	barge	OWN	4000	2006	4.1	93.5	11.45					
Hururu 8	barge	OWN	4000	2006	4.1	93.5	11.45					
Hururu 9	barge	OWN	4000	2006	4.1	93.5	11.45					
Christopher	tug	OWN	230	1997	3.67	35	9					
Arabian Tahr	tug	OWN	140	2008	3.6	22.57	7.88					
Catherine	tug	OWN	140	2012	3.6	22	8					
Hamburg	tug	OWN	140	2006	3.6	22	7.88					
Kiev	tug	OWN	140	2006	3.6	22	7.88					
Lubeck	tug	OWN	140	2007	3.6	22.57	7.88					
Moskau	tug	OWN	140	2007	3.6	22	7.84					
Odessa	tug	OWN	140	2006	3.6	22	7.88					
Danube	tug	OWN	85	2006	2.2	16	5.29					
Rhein	tug	OWN	85	2006	2.2	16	5.29					
Arkad 1	tug	B/B		2002	3.85	26	10.8					
Arkad 2	tug	B/B		2002	3.85	26	10.8					
Carnival 1	service craft	OWN	50	2016	2.5	16	5					
J'Ouvert	service craft	OWN	50	2016	2.5	16	5					
Arkad 3	service craft	B/B		2002	1.65	15	4.8					
Christine	service craft	OWN		2012	1.2	12	5					
Maria B	service craft	OWN		2007	1.2	14	5					
OC Star	service craft	OWN		2008	1.2	14	6					
Road Runner	service craft	OWN		2006	0.8	11	3.5					
Stephanie	service craft	OWN		2005	1.2	14	5					

== See also ==
- Elisabeth Oldendorff 1992
- Irene Oldendorff 1944
- Magdalena Oldendorff 1996
