= Mariño Municipality =

Mariño Municipality may refer to:

- Santiago Mariño Municipality
- Mariño Municipality, Nueva Esparta
- Mariño Municipality, Sucre
