= Initiative for the Integration of the Regional Infrastructure of South America =

The Initiative for the Integration of the Regional Infrastructure of South America (IIRSA) is a development plan to link South America's economies through new transportation, energy, and telecommunications projects.

IIRSA investments are expected to integrate highway networks, river ways, hydroelectric dams and telecommunications links throughout the continent—particularly in remote, isolated regions—to allow greater trade and create a South American community of nations.

The initiative was launched in late 2000 with the participation of the 12 countries of South America which form the Union of South American Nations. It is being supported by CAF – Development Bank of Latin America and the Caribbean, the Inter-American Development Bank (IDB) and the River Plate Basin Financial Development Fund (FONPLATA). Together the three institutions form the Technical Coordination Committee (CCT) which provides technical and financial support for IIRSA activities.

== Region ==
The project is subdivided in several regions, called hubs.

=== Guianese Shield Hub ===
Within the Guianese Shield Hub, 4 groups of projects have been identified.

==== Group 1: Interconnection Venezuela-Brazil ====
The anchor project within the first group is the rehabilitation of the Caracas-Manaus road.

==== Group 2: Interconnection Guyana-Brazil ====
The anchor project within the second group is the improvement of Boa Vista-Bonfim-Lethem-Georgetown road. The construction of the Takutu River Bridge between Guyana and Brazil on this road was a separate project within IIRSA, built by the Engineer Corps of the Brazilian Army, as is the construction of a deep water port in northern Guyana and a hydropower plant in Amaila, among others.

==== Group 3: Interconnection Venezuela-Guyana-Suriname ====
The anchor project within the third group is the improvement and construction of the Ciudad Guayana-San Martín de Turumbang-Linden-Apoera-Paramaribo road with a connection from Linden to Georgetown. Only the section between San Martín de Turumbang and Linden seems likely to be reconstructed in the imminent future. The various bridges proposed on this route, including the international crossings on the Cuyuni River (Venezuela-Guyana) and Corentyne River (Guyana-Suriname) are also projects within group 3. The section within Suriname of this route is part of the Southern East-West Link.

==== Group 4: Interconnection Guyana-Suriname-French Guiana-Brazil ====
The anchor project in the fourth group is the improvement of the Georgetown-Albina road, which includes a bridge linking Albina with Saint-Laurent-du-Maroni in French Guiana over the Marowijne River. The section within Suriname of this route is part of the Northern East-West Link. The bridge between French Guiana and Brazil on the Oyapock River and the improvement of the road between Oiapoque and Macapá are also part of this group. It has been suggested that French Guiana, which is not part of the IIRSA project, be included in this respect as an observing partner.

== Criticism ==
According to Conservation International scientist Tim Killeen, who conducted a study on the IIRSA, the current plans could lead to the destruction of the Amazon rainforest and have profound and far-reaching consequences.

The study shows that cutting and burning of the forests could seriously imperil the multibillion-dollar agriculture industry of the Rio Plata basin, as well as destroy the ecosystems that are home to indigenous people. According to the study, the IIRSA would also wipe out some of Earth's richest storehouses of terrestrial and freshwater life and would negatively affect climate change by releasing into the atmosphere the huge quantities of carbon dioxide stored in the biomass of the tropical forest—estimated at twenty times the world's total annual greenhouse gas emissions.

According to Killeen, the IIRSA does not have to be destructive: "A visionary initiative such as IIRSA should be visionary in all of its dimensions, and should incorporate measures to ensure that the region’s renewable natural resources are conserved and its traditional communities strengthened."

== See also ==
- Gulf of Paria crossing
- Mesoamerica Project
