= Mesoamerican region =

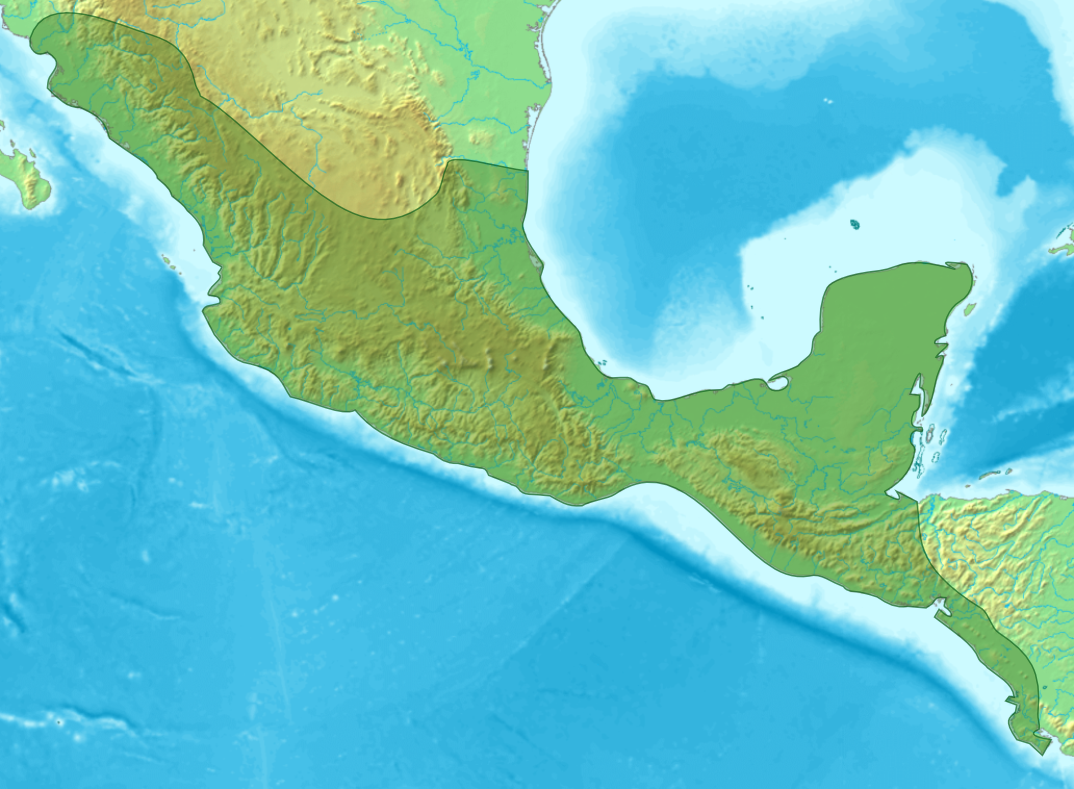
The Mesoamerican region in Mexico and Central America

The Mesoamerican region (often abbreviated MAR) is a trans-national economic region in the Americas that is recognized by the OECD and other economic and developmental organizations, comprising the united economies of the seven countries in Central America – Belize, Costa Rica, El Salvador, Guatemala, Honduras, Nicaragua, and Panama; plus nine south–eastern states of Mexico – Campeche, Chiapas, Guerrero, Oaxaca, Puebla, Quintana Roo, Tabasco, Veracruz, and Yucatán.

Designated as an 'economic territory' by the OECD, the identification of the Mesoamerican region as a focus for common regional economic development has been observed since the adoption in 2001 by the signatory countries of the Puebla-Panama Plan (PPP), an initiative intended to foster regional integration and development across southeastern Mexico and the countries of Central America. The PPP also includes the country of Colombia; other than this, the territory and governments involved with the PPP are the same as those covered by OECD's Mesoamerican region.

Situated within the wider region of Middle America (on the tapering isthmus of southern North America), the geographical region defined by the MAR loosely correlates with that of Mesoamerica, the pre-Columbian culture area defined and identified by archaeologists, anthropologists, linguists and ethnohistorians. For several thousand years prior to the European colonization of the Americas beginning in the early 16th century, the diverse cultures and civilizations of Mesoamerica also shared in common a number of broad cultural, historical and linguistic traits. The modern-day indigenous populations who are the descendants of pre-Columbian cultures number roughly over 11 million people (approx. 17.2% of total regional population) spread across the MAR economic territory, and are largely among the most disadvantaged and marginalized groups in the region.

== See also ==
- Americas (terminology)
