= Mesoamerica Project =

Mesoamerica Integration and Development Project
- Coat of arms
- Membership: 10 countries Belize; Colombia; Costa Rica; Dominican Republic; El Salvador; Guatemala; Honduras; Mexico; Nicaragua; Panama
- Establishment: 2008

Area
  - Total: 3,676,719 km^{2} (1,419,589 sq mi)
- Website

The Mesoamerica Integration and Development Project, or in Spanish Proyecto Mesoamérica (PM), is a mechanism by which 10 countries centered on Central America implement regional projects for development and integration. The 10 participating countries are Belize, Colombia, Costa Rica, Dominican Republic, El Salvador, Guatemala, Honduras, Mexico, Nicaragua and Panama. The initiative was championed by the then-Mexican President, Vicente Fox. It is the successor to the Puebla-Panama Plan (PPP) first announced in 2001. The Mesoamerica Integration and Development Project was launched under that name in 2008.

== Goals and financing ==
The objective of Mesoamerica Project is to contribute to the improvement of the quality of life of the region's population through social and economic development projects, based on sustainable development and integration through the delivery of regional public goods.

The Mesoamerica Project has an innovative form of financing for the projects it supports, including contributions from each of its Member States, funds from Mesoamerican regional agencies, traditional aid, south-south and triangular cooperation, as well as public-private partnerships.

== Projects ==
The work of the mechanism targets two main pillars in nine strategic sectors:

Economic Projects

1. Transport

• The International Network of Mesoamerican Highway (RICAM)

• The Mesoamerican Integration Corridor (CMI)

• The Regional Bridges Programme

• Short Sea Shipping Maritime Transport (TMCD) in Mesoamerica

2. Energy

• Central America Electrical Interconnection System (SIEPAC)

• Electrical interconnection Mexico-Guatemala

• Electrical interconnection Panama-Colombia

• Efficient Lighting Strategy in Central America

• The Mesoamerican Network for Research and Development of Biofuels (RMIDB) integrated by academia representatives from member states.

3. Telecommunications

• The Mesoamerican Information Highway (AMI)

4. Trade Facilitation and competitiveness

• International Transit of Goods (TIM)

• Increased competitiveness and support for SMEs

• Mesoamerican Program for Coordinated Border Management (includes Authorized Economic Operators and One-Stop Shop mechanisms)

Social Projects focused on sustainable development

1. Health

• the Mesoamerican Public-Health System (SMSP)

• the Mesoamerican 2015 Health Initiative.

2. Disaster risk management

• the Mesoamerican Environmental Sustainability Strategy (EMSA).

3. Environment

• The Mesoamerican Comprehensive Risk Management Network (RM-GIR).

4. Housing

• The Central American Social Housing Development Program.

5. Food security and nutrition

• Mesoamerica Against Hunger is a regional intervention implemented by Food and Agriculture Organization

== History ==
The Puebla-Panama Plan (PPP) was first announced by Mexico's President Vicente Fox on March 12, 2001 and officially launched on June 15, 2001.

In March 2004, Fox officially announced the relaunch of the PPP. Among the changes made were a new emphasis social concerns.

After Felipe Calderón was elected president of Mexico, he continued the project. He had been a proponent of the Mesoamerica Integration and Development Project which was now merged with a similar funding and infrastructure project, the Puebla-Panama Plan (PPP).

The Mesoamerica Integration and Development Project was launched in 2008 by the Heads of State and Government of Colombia, Mexico and Central America during the X Summit of the Tuxtla Dialogue and Consultation Mechanism, thus becoming the technical instance for cooperation and integration within this mechanism.

Calderón expanded the Mesoamerican Integration and Development Project, now including Colombia, and has stated that "the challenge (of the mechanism) is to foster democratic practices with solid foundation in the region".

== See also ==
- Central American Integration System
- Mesoamerican region, an economic territory defined by the OECD, with the same membership scope as the PM, except Colombia and the Dominican Republic.
- Initiative for the Integration of the Regional Infrastructure of South America
