= MV Elisabeth Oldendorff =

History
- Name: Xin Xian Rui
- Owner: Oldendorff Shipping (1992-2004); Investeringsgruppen Danmark A/S; Yang Pu Zhe Hai Shipping
- Port of registry: (China) Hong Kong
- Builder: Saiki Heavy Industries, Saiki, Ōita
- Launched: 18 May 1992
- Completed: 1992
- Renamed: Elisabeth Oldendorff; Xin Xiang Ruidvy
- Identification: IMO number: 9032707; Callsign: VRAI8 (Elisabeth Oldendorff); BINK (Xin Xian Rui)
- Status: in active service

General characteristics
- Type: Bulk carrier
- Tonnage: 22,154 DWT
- Length: 157 m (515 ft 1 in) OA; 148 metres (485 ft 7 in) PP
- Beam: 25 m (82 ft 0 in)
- Draught: 9 m (29 ft 6 in)
- Propulsion: 2 S.A. 6-cylinder engine; 1 propeller
- Speed: 14 knots (26 km/h)

MV Xin Xiang Rui is a bulk carrier conducting cargo runs mostly in East Asia, China and Australia-Pacific. She was previously named Elisabeth Oldendorff and Xin Xiang Ruidvy.

She was built in 1992 by Saiki Heavy Industries in Japan for the Oldendorff shipping company. She was sold in 2004 and acquired at some point by Investeringsgruppen Danmark A/S. Her present owner is Yang Pu Zhe Hai Shipping, Shanghai, China.
