= Columbus Channel =

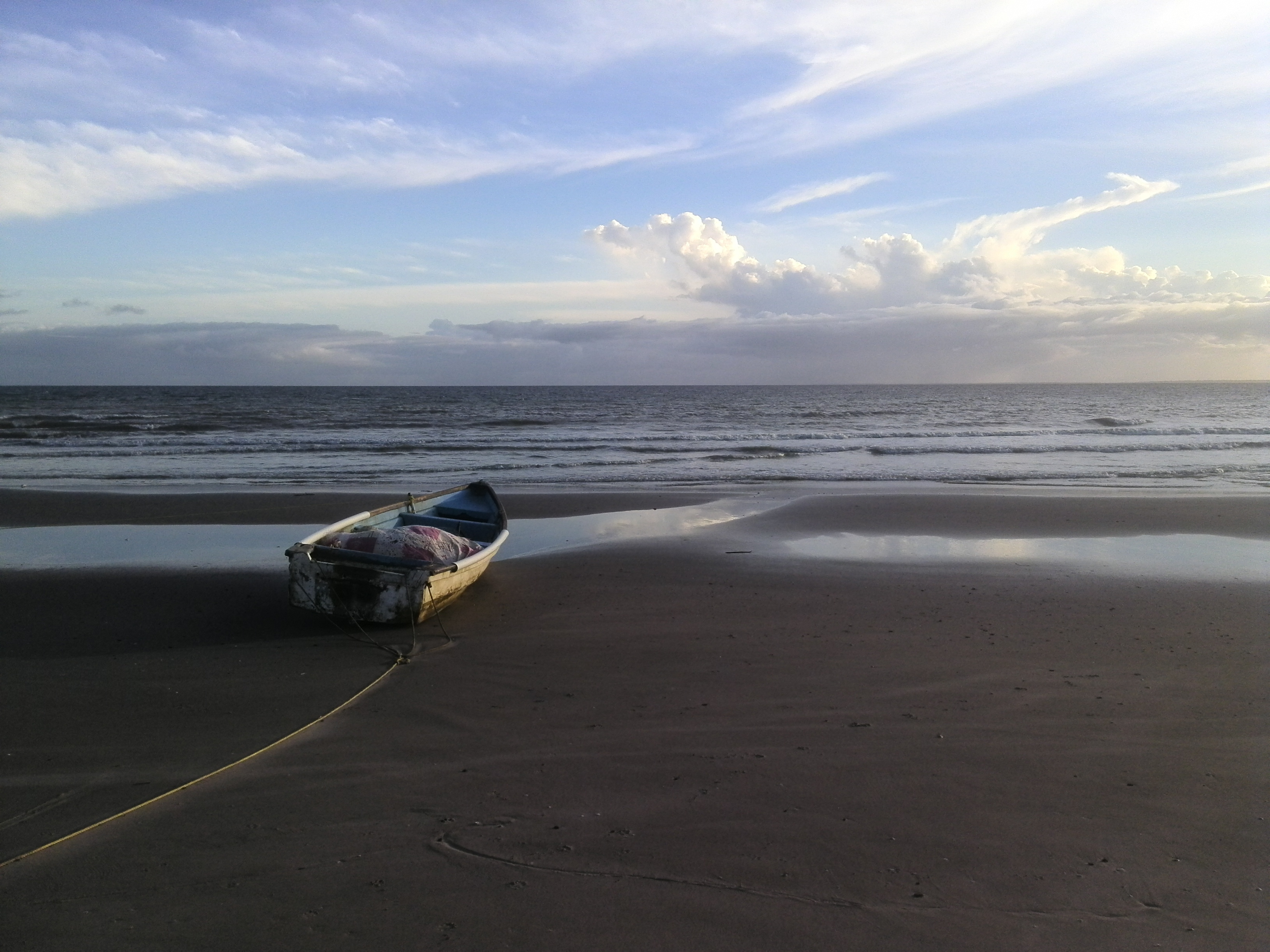
- View over the Columbus Channel from Icacos, Trinidad.

- Location within Trinidad and Tobago Location within the Caribbean
- Location: Gulf of Paria–Caribbean Sea (Atlantic Ocean)
- Coordinates: 10°00′N 61°30′W
- Type: Strait
- Basin countries: Venezuela; Trinidad and Tobago

The Columbus Channel or Serpent's Mouth (Spanish: Boca de la Serpiente), is a strait lying between Icacos Point in southwest Trinidad and Tobago and the north coast of Venezuela. It leads from the Atlantic Ocean to the Gulf of Paria. The channel is about nine miles (14 km) wide at its narrowest point.

== History ==
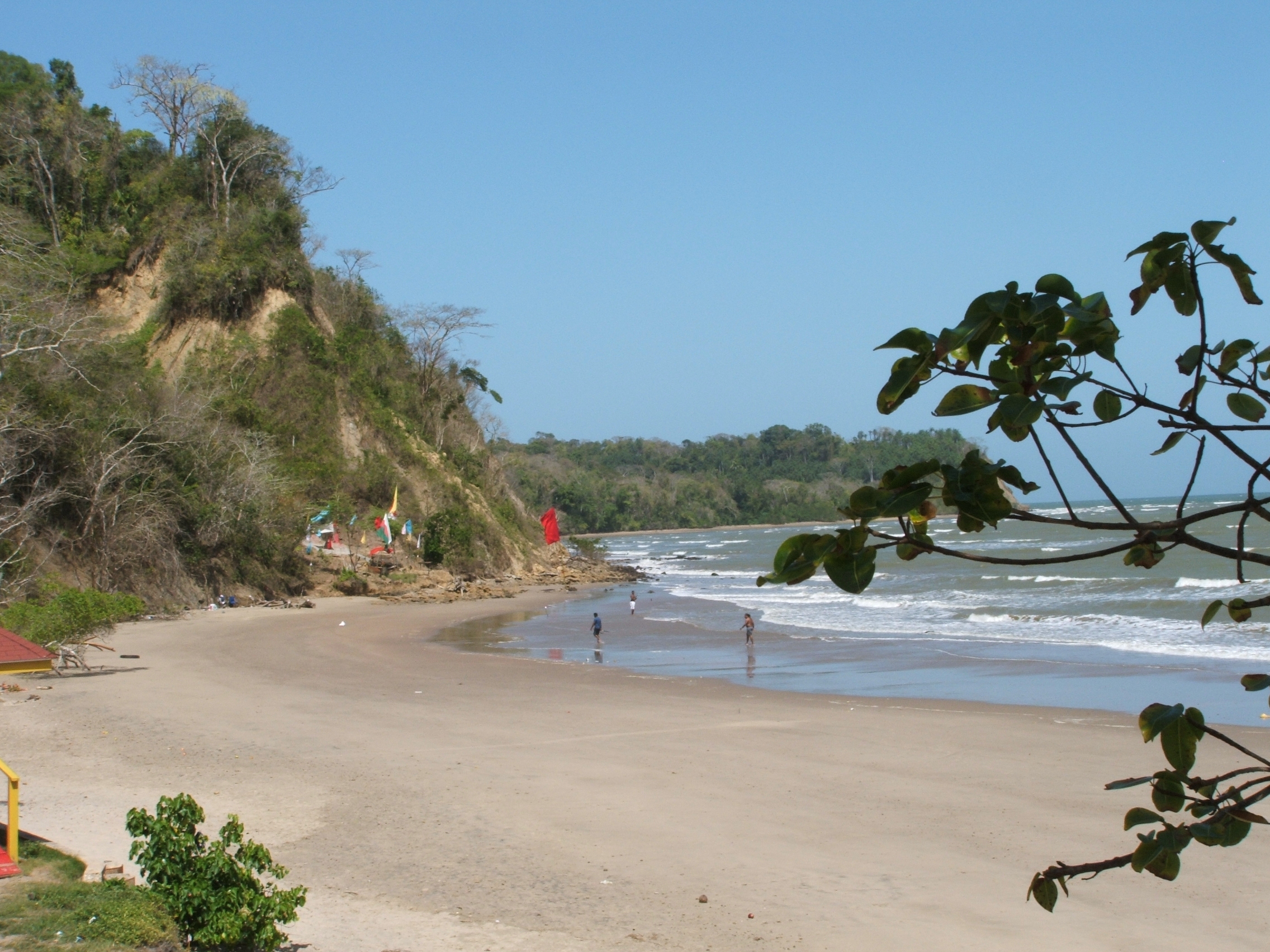
Quinam bay, Columbus Channel, South Coast, Trinidad & Tobago.

The passage was named by Christopher Columbus on his third voyage.
