= Piracy in Venezuela =

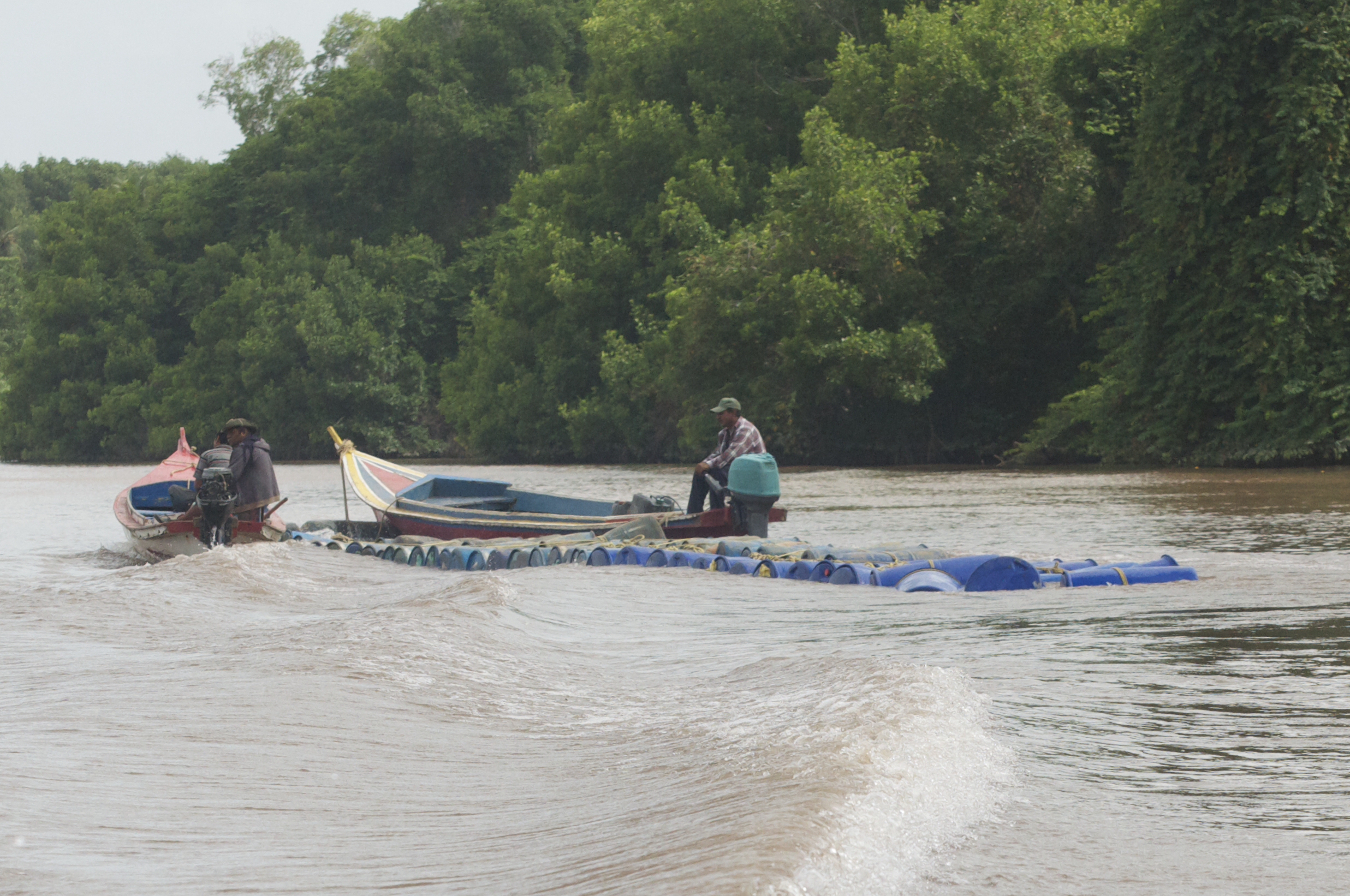
Gasoline smuggling in the Limón River, Zulia state

Piracy off the coast of Venezuela increased during the crisis in Venezuela. The situation has been compared to piracy off the coast of Somalia, which was also caused by economic collapse. As Venezuelans grow more desperate, fears of increasing incidents and range of piracy have been reported. Venezuelan pirates often smuggle weapons, drugs and sex trafficking victims. Authorities have also been involved in piracy near the coast of Venezuela.

== History ==
At the end of the 20th century, Venezuela had a successful fishing industry where international business and trade occurred. When Hugo Chávez was elected president in 1998, he changed the country's social, political and economic structure through the Bolivarian Revolution. Populist policies initiated by Chávez and continued by his successor, Nicolás Maduro, drove the country into a decline, with poverty, inflation and shortages in Venezuela increasing. By 2015, the tonnage of fish caught in Venezuela dropped by 60% compared to when Chávez entered office, with thousands of fishermen losing their jobs.

Many fishermen who previously worked in Venezuela's once successful fishing industry turned to piracy. Pirates would steal, smuggle drugs and traffic humans. The trend has direct echoes of the Somali piracy crisis, where impoverished fishermen likewise turned to hijacking passing vessels after the country's collapse into lawlessness in the 1990s.

Government is absent, bandits are everywhere, and participating can cost you your life. But not participating can also mean death, because the official economy of Venezuela is in a state of collapse, and the people are starving.

— Bloomberg

In 2010, the Bolivarian government expropriated and nationalized the fishing industry in the state of Sucre, one of the poorest states in Venezuela. The region once had the fourth largest fleet of tuna ships in the world, but by late 2016, many former fishermen in the state became pirates. The pirates killed fishermen in the area and threatened businesses, preying on individuals who entered the open sea and stealing their boat engines, fish and other goods. According to Oceans Beyond Piracy (OBP), a total of 21 pirate attacks were reported near Venezuela in 2016.

Into 2017, piracy grew in Lake Maracaibo, with bandits attempting to rob and kill boaters in the area for their possessions. Croakers, valuable fish caught in the waters that contain swim bladders rich in collagen, are often targeted by pirates in the area to be sold in international markets. The Bolivarian Navy of Venezuela, according to locals, rarely patrols the waters. Pirates would also strip equipment from PDVSA oil facilities near Lake Maracaibo's waters. In total, 71 incidents of piracy occurred in Venezuelan waters according to OBP, a 163% increase from the previous year.

Reports of Venezuelan pirates attacking luxury yachts in the Caribbean began to emerge in 2018. Pirates also make an income by smuggling goods from Trinidad and Tobago into Venezuela, where there is scarcity of numerous common products due to economic issues. With the two countries being two hours apart by water, Venezuelan pirates can receive high profits selling Trinidadian goods in their native country, and then return to the island nation to sell discounted Venezuelan contraband. Venezuelans also fear government authorities who are just as desperate, accusing law enforcement of piracy as well. The violence in the area led Trinidad and Tobago Newsday to name the waters the "Gulf of No Return".

In 2023, there was a marked increase in coordinated attacks by pirate groups. A significant incident in March 2023 involved pirates hijacking a cargo vessel near the island of Margarita, demanding ransom for the release of the crew. The Venezuelan government, in response to growing international pressure, announced an increase in naval patrols along the most affected regions, although local reports suggest these measures have yet to significantly deter pirate activities.

Additionally, there have been increased instances of piracy linked to organized crime networks, with some attacks being traced back to criminal syndicates operating out of major Venezuelan cities. In April 2023, a joint operation between Venezuelan and Colombian authorities led to the capture of a notorious pirate leader known for orchestrating numerous high-profile hijackings in the Caribbean.

=== Oil tanker seizures by the United States ===
In December 2025, the Venezuelan government described the United States seizure of the oil tanker Skipper as "a shameless robbery and an act of international piracy". On 22 December, following the seizures by the United States, Venezuela's National Assembly unanimously passed a law criminalising and imposing up to 20-year prison sentences for individuals who promote, finance, or participate in piracy and blockades. The bill was titled the "Law to Guarantee Freedom of Navigation and Commerce Against Piracy, Blockades, and Other International Illicit Acts".

== See also ==
- Piracy off the coast of Somalia
