= Irapa =

- Location within Venezuela
- Coordinates: 10.5706°N 62.5822°W
- Country: Venezuela
- State: Sucre
- Time zone: UTC-4:30 (VST)
  - Summer (DST): UTC-4:30 (not observed)

Irapa is a town in Sucre State, Venezuela. It is the capital of the Mariño Municipality.
