= Icacos Point =

Place in Trinidad and Tobago

Icacos Point is the southwesternmost point in Trinidad and Tobago. It is at the end of a long peninsula that forms Saint Patrick County. A channel called the Serpent's Mouth separates Icacos Point from the coast of Venezuela, only 11 kilometers away. A good image of the Serpent's mouth is seen in Travelling Luck's link which provides additional detail on the area "Although Icacos is referred to as a Point which suggests a narrow piece of land, parts of the area are also been referred to as a village in Teneil Nurse's blog where Ms Nurse writes on the history of Icacos.

== Activity & Places of Interest ==
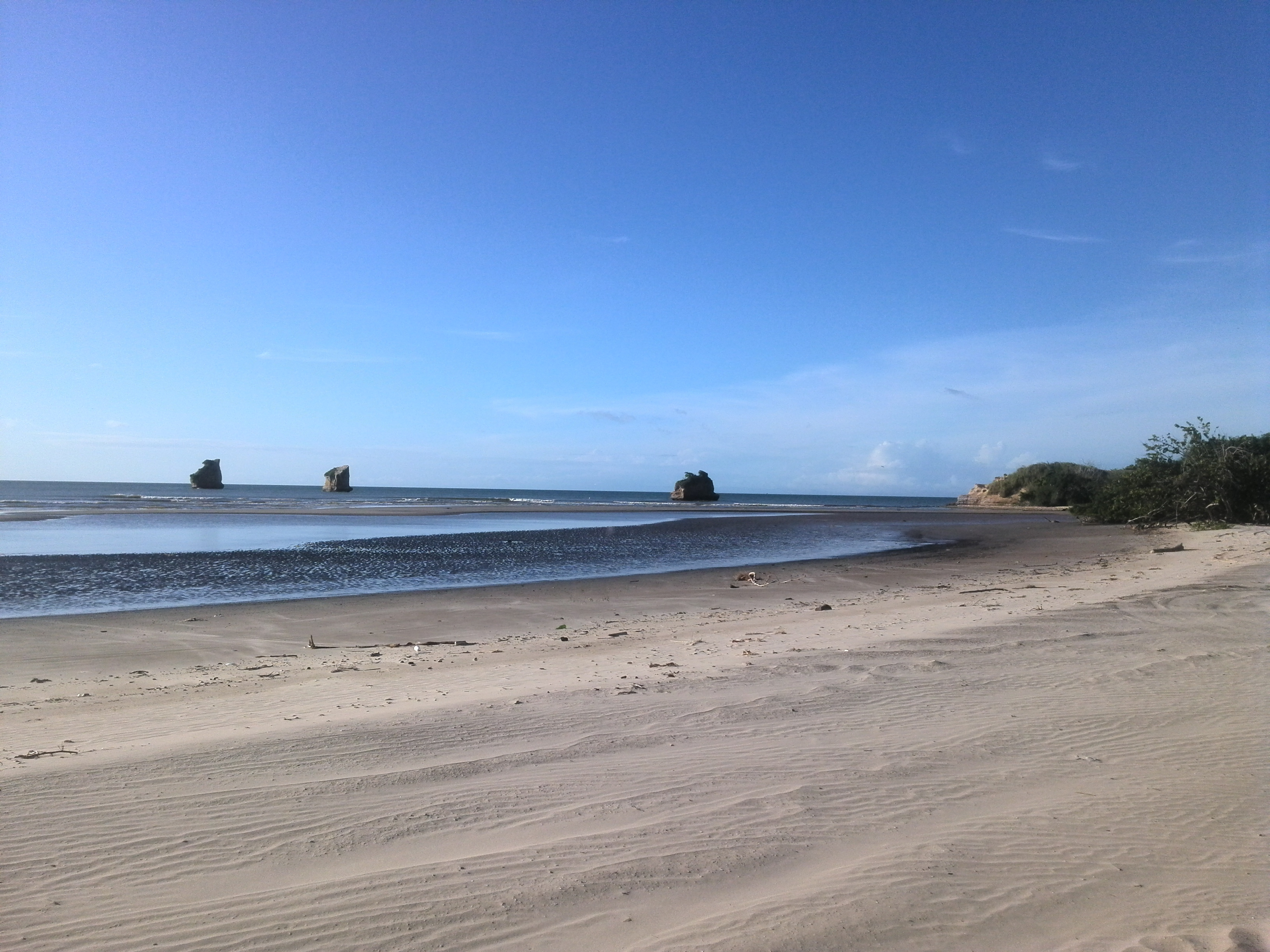
Three Sisters, Columbus Bay, Icacos

=== Icacos Beach ===
The Icacos Beach which is photographed in the link, is identified as being after Icacos. While this may be so, given that Icacos is an area which is exposed to the sea on many sides, there may be other beaches worth exploring, however the state of the road may need to be taken into account in planning a visit to the beach in Icacos.

=== Primary school ===
In 2008, a new primary school was opened in Icacos in what was formerly a coconut estate. The new primary school replaced the older wooden structure in which persons such as one of the former Prime Ministers of the country, Mr. George Chambers was educated. Designed as a model school, the structure houses a computer lab, a music room and a library. There is the intent to offer classes to the adults, in addition to the children of the nearby villages.

=== Great Icacos Lagoons ===
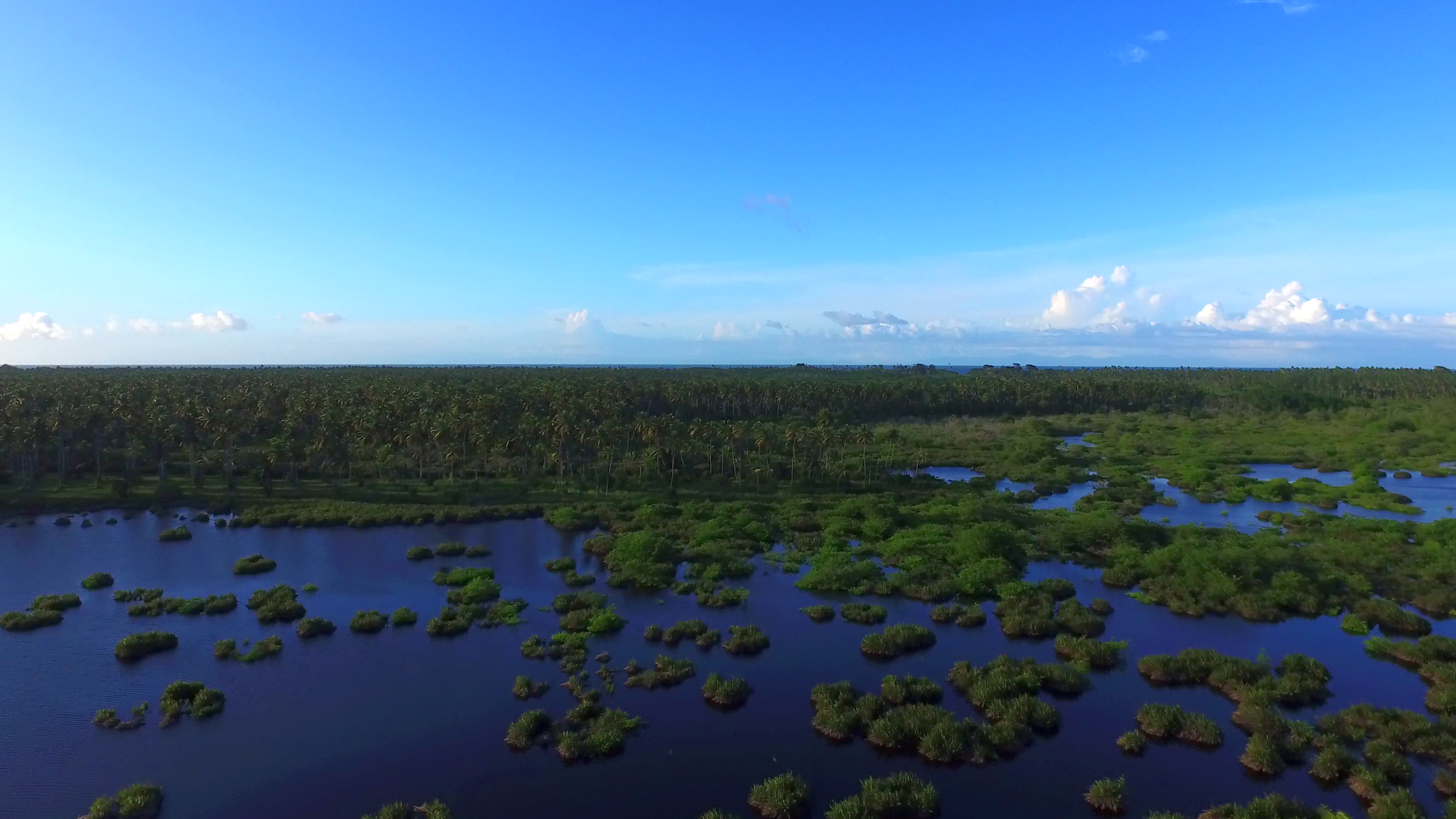
Icacos Wetlands

On the way to Icacos lies a single lane road way that is flanked on opposite sides by two large saltwater lagoons. A popular site for bird watchers. The national bird the Scarlet ibis can be frequently seen here.

=== Icacos Health Centre ===
A Health Centre was established in Icacos under the South Western Regional Health Facility to serve adults and children.

=== Constance Estate/Coconut Oil Factory/Steam Boiler/ Barrack Style Accommodation ===
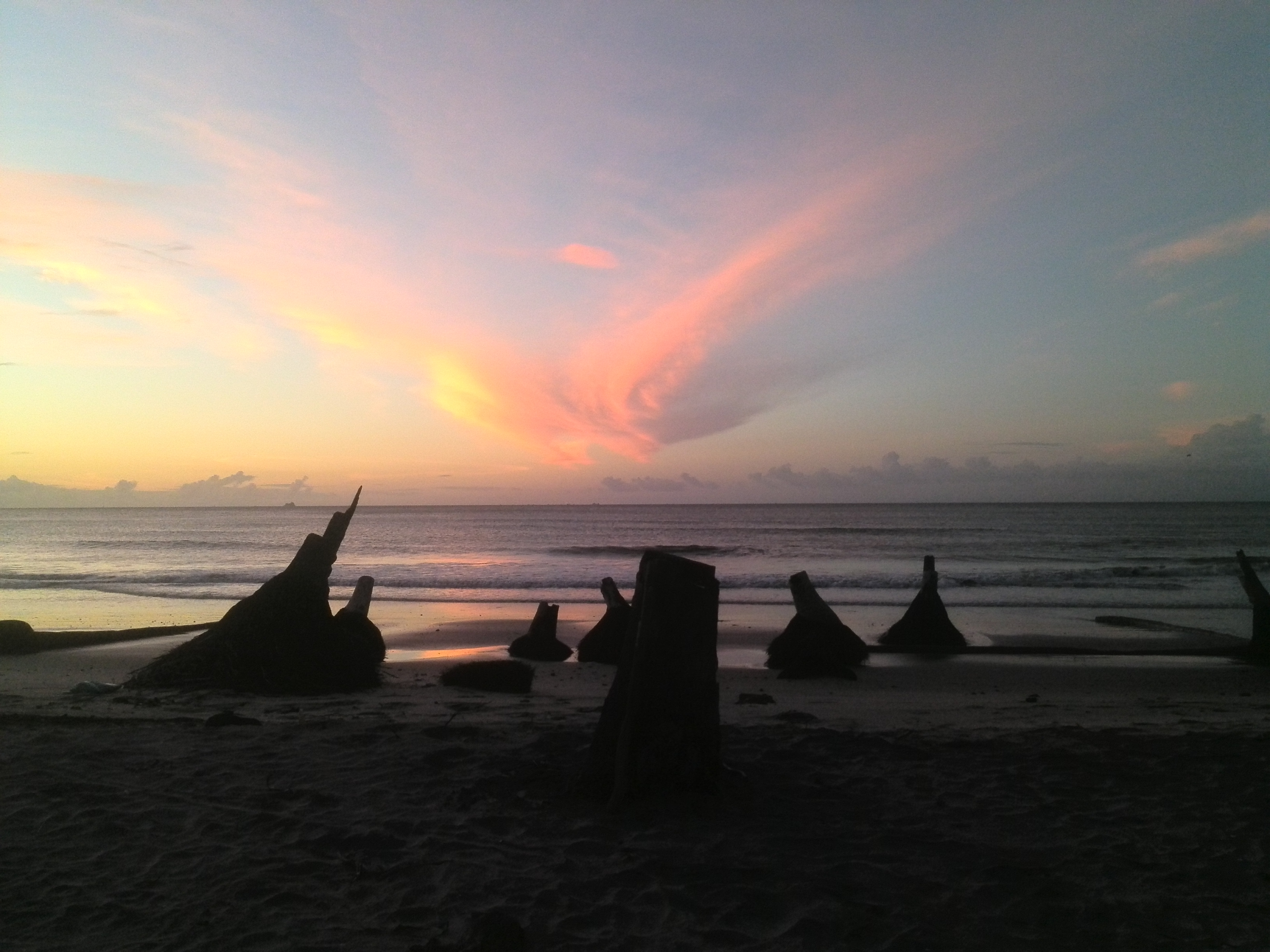
Coral Point, Constance Estate

According to information provided in a 2009 photo of the coconut oil factory on Constance Estate, "the coconut oil factory was erected in 1907, the chimney was constructed using 20,000 Glasgow bricks which were used in the hold of a ship as ballast". There are photos of the chimney which extends into the sky above the ruins of a nearby building in 2010. Also located on the Constance Estate is an old Steam Boiler, which was still in place in a Sept 2010 photo. The steam boiler was used on the estate from the 1920s to the 1960s according to the post accompanying the photo.

There are photos of well preserved Barrack style housing which were built in the 1850s for use by the indentured laborers on the Constance Estate. In the image is a jalousie style window which may have been at odds with the concept of barrack style housing as this style of window would have been out of character for the style of the building, however it is in keeping with the style of other amenities of the property. In 2010, according to Angelo Bissessarsingh, one of the units of the barrack style house was still in use by a single employee of the estate.

10°03′38″N 61°55′40″W
