= Mariño Municipality, Sucre =

Mariño Municipality Municipio Mariño
- Municipality
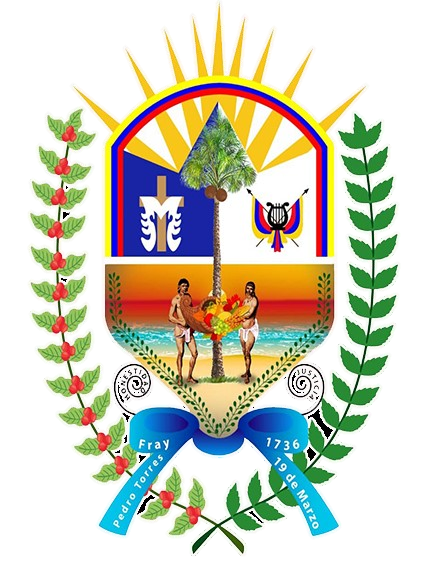
- Coat of arms

- Location in Sucre

- Location in Venezuela
- Coordinates: 10°36′N 62°36′W
- Country: Venezuela
- State: Sucre

Area
  - Total: 469 km^{2} (181 sq mi)
- Time zone: UTC−4 (VET)
- Website: Official website

Mariño is a municipality of Sucre State, Venezuela. It has five parishes, and the municipal seat is in Irapa. As of 2021, it has a population of 28,217.
