= Plata Basin Financial Development Fund =

Multilateral financial entity in South America

FONPLATA Development Bank - Formerly Río de la Plata Basin Financial Development Fund
- FONPLATA Banco de Desarrollo
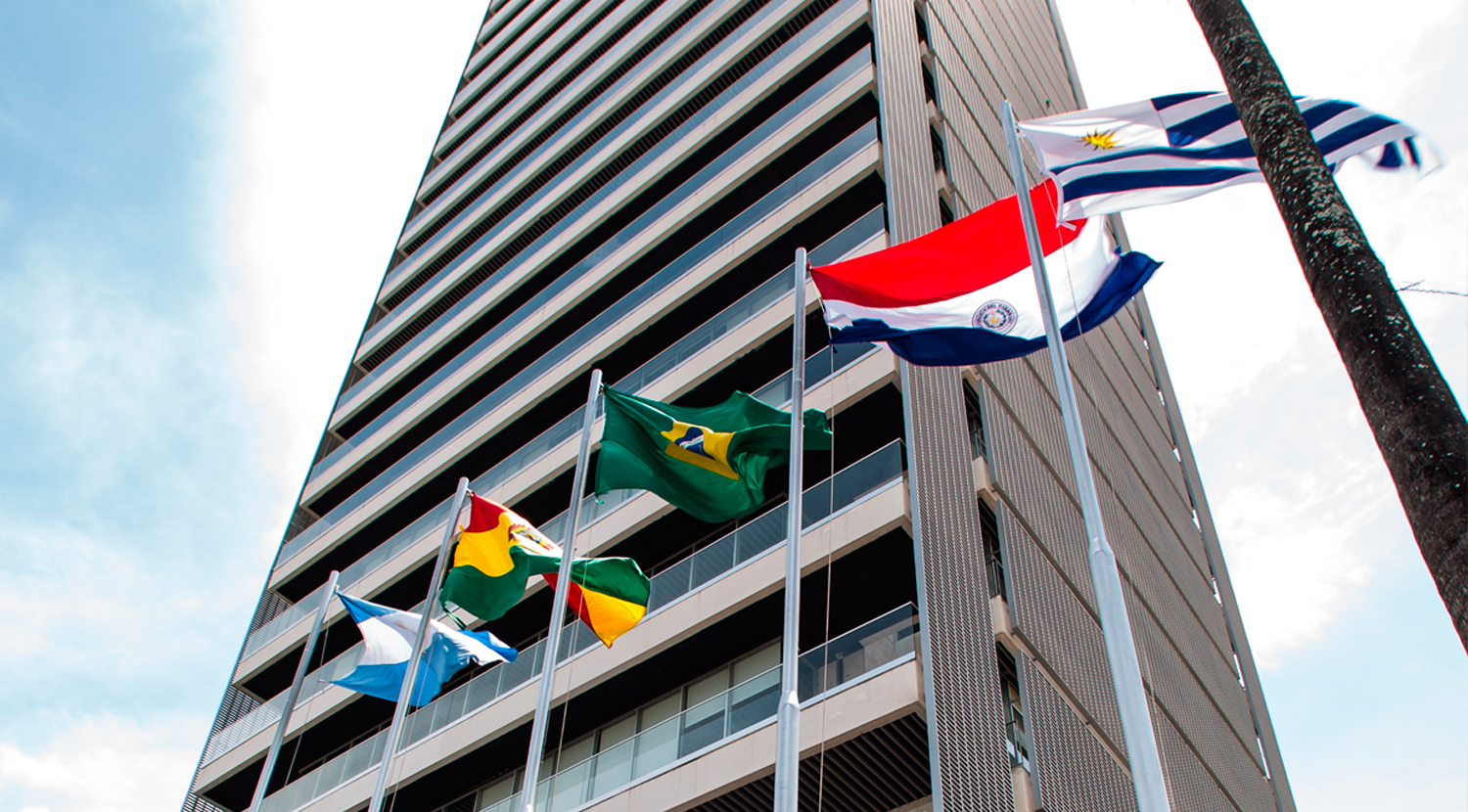
- FONPLATA Development Bank Headquarters, in Santa Cruz de la Sierra (Bolivia)

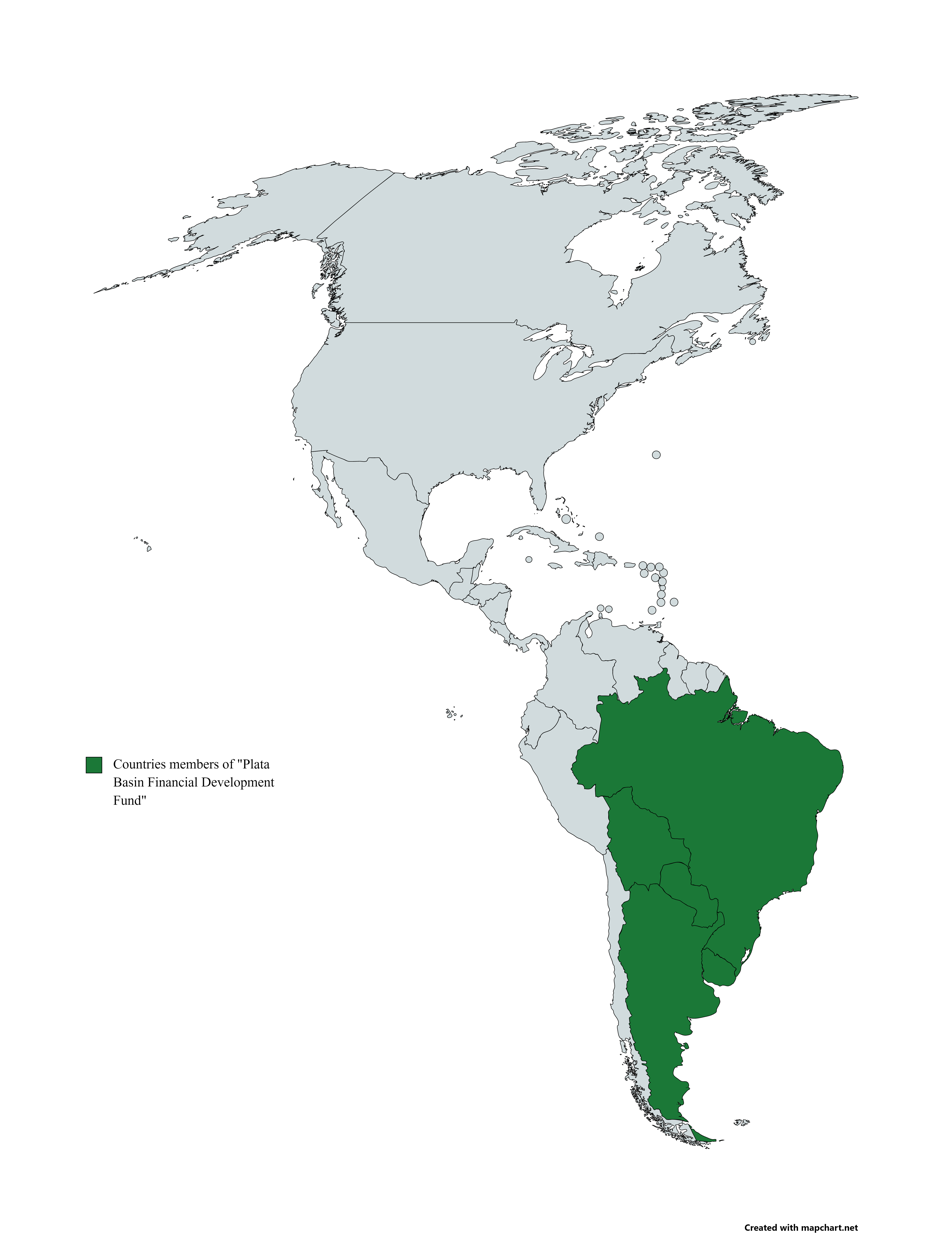
- Abbreviation: FONPLATA Development Bank
- Established: June 12, 1974
- Type: International organization
- Headquarters: Avenida San Martín #155, barrio Equipetrol, edificio Ambassador Business Center Piso 3 Santa Cruz de la Sierra; Bolivia
- Region served: Río de la Plata Basin
- Members: 5 countries
- Official language: Spanish
- Executive President: Juan E. Notaro
- Main organ: Assembly of Governors
- Website: www.fonplata.org

FONPLATA Development Bank, formerly known as Río de la Plata Basin Financial Development Fund, is a multilateral financial entity formed by the five countries of this South America sub-region: Argentina, Bolivia, Brazil, Paraguay, and Uruguay.

== History ==
FONPLATA was established on June 12, 1974 by the Fourth Meeting of Plata Basin Foreign Affairs Ministries. It started operations in 1977 in the city of Sucre (Bolivia). In 2002 it relocated to Santa Cruz de la Sierra in the same country.

FONPLATA Development Bank aims to support its members' integration by financing medium and small-sized projects, prioritizing rural and border areas, and to complement development efforts by national institutions and other international cooperation agencies. In addition to loans, the institution also finances grants and technical cooperations.

Since September 27, 2016, Standard & Poor's has ranked FONPLATA Development Bank with A−, stable outlook. Moody's Investors Service has rated the institution with A2.

In November 2018, it was consolidated under the name of FONPLATA Development Bank through the Constitutive Agreement's modification, to allow strategic alliances with new member countries, other agencies, and multilateral credit banks with shared institutional values and development objectives.

== Structure ==
Its governing bodies are:

- the Governors' Assembly: 5 members, one for each member country;
- the Executive Board, also composed of 5 members; and
- the Chief Executive Officer (CEO), which is elected by the Assembly. The incumbent FONPLATA CEO is Juan E. Notaro, from Uruguay.

== Projects ==
Most FONPLATA Development Bank's projects refer to infrastructure improvement, prioritizing intra and inter-regional connectivity, urban development, and environment. It has also supported productive and cultural development projects consistent with its mission of mitigating economic and social asymmetries.

FONPLATA Development Bank develops corporate social responsibility projects. It has supported the International Festival of Renaissance and Baroque Music, and the Santa Cruz de la Sierra International Theatre Festival, both of them organized by the Bolivian Association for Art and Culture (APAC for its acronym in Spanish).

The institution has also been a sponsor of TECHO, an international NGO, and the Santa Cruz International Film Festival (FENAVID).

== See also ==
- CAF – Development Bank of Latin America and the Caribbean
- Central American Bank for Economic Integration
- Inter-American Development Bank
