= Biota of Trinidad and Tobago =

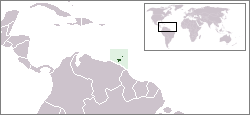
Location of Trinidad and Tobago

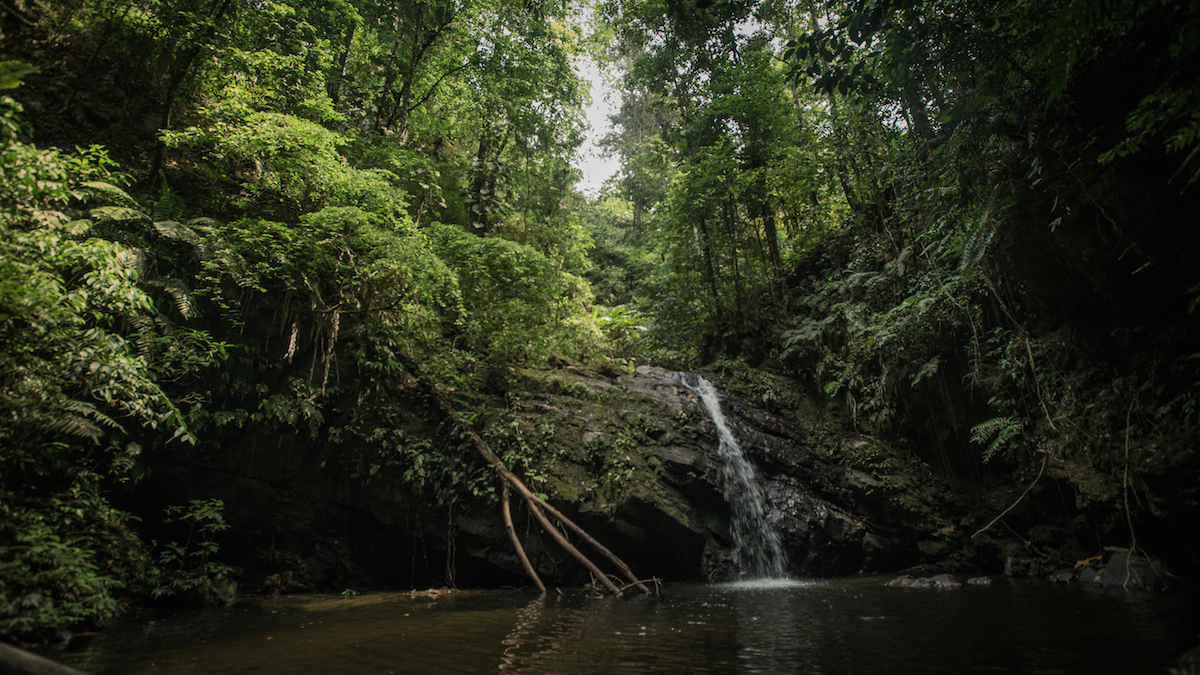
Grande Riviere, a moist forest region

Trinidad and Tobago are continental islands with a geologically very recent history of direct land bridge connection to South America. As a result, unlike most of the Caribbean Islands, Trinidad and Tobago supports a primarily South American flora and fauna and has greater diversity of plant and animal species than the Antilles. However, rates of endemism are lower than in the rest of the Caribbean because there has been less time for genetic isolation from mainland populations. Specifically, a land bridge to Venezuela existed fairly recently in Trinidad, allowing fewer opportunities for speciation than in Tobago, as well as a lot of overlap in biodiversity with the South American mainland.

Trinidad is nearer to mainland South America and has been directly connected to the mainland via land bridges more often and for longer periods than Tobago. This, as well as Trinidad's larger size and more varied topography and hydrology compared to that of Tobago, allows more ecosystem diversity in the former island compared to the latter.

== Plant communities ==
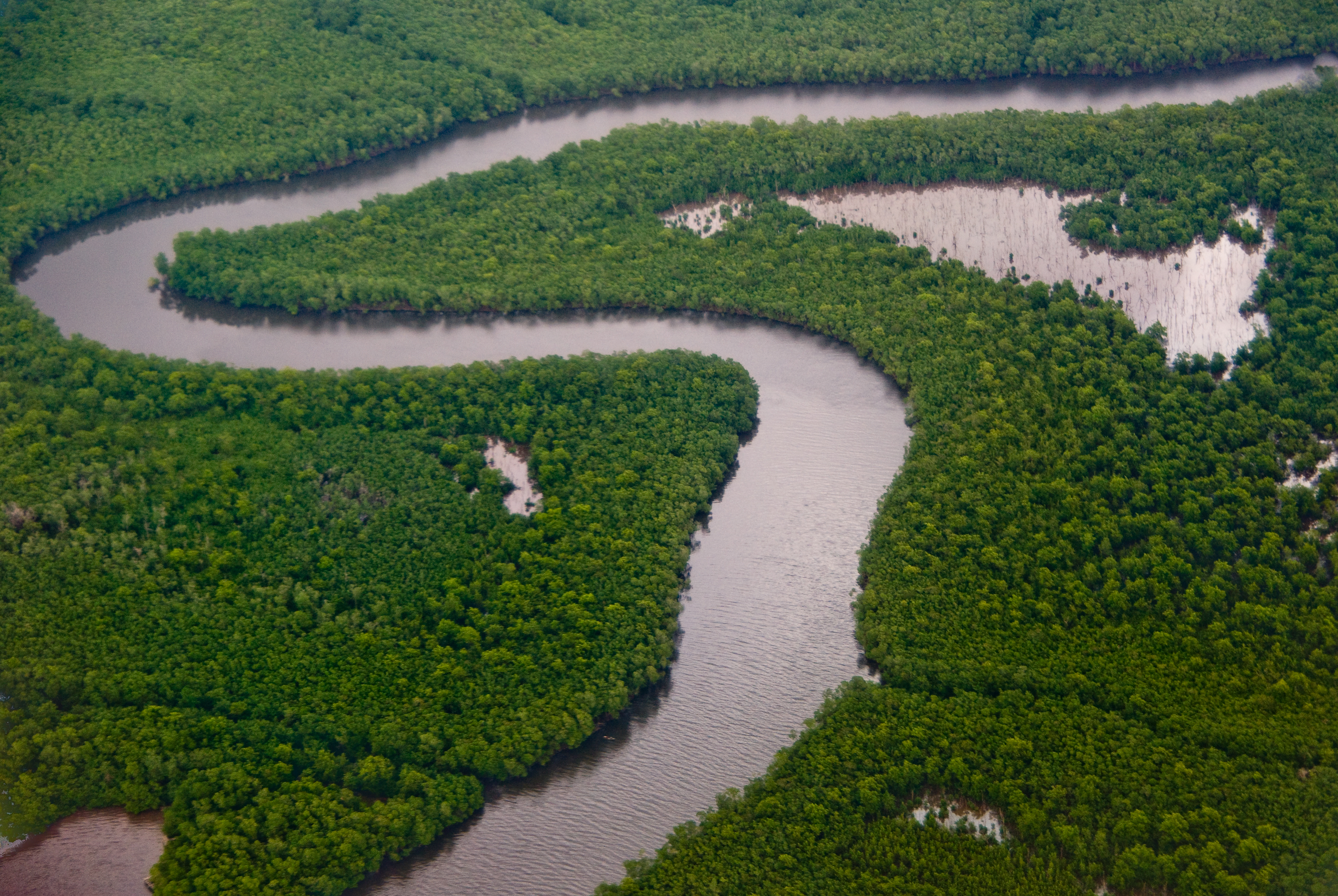
Caroni Swamp, Trinidad

The standard description of plant communities follows John Beard's work (Beard, 1946). He classified natural vegetation in a hierarchical fashion on the basis of the physiognomy of the dominant trees.

- Seasonal formations
  - Evergreen seasonal forest
  - Semi-deciduous seasonal forest
  - Deciduous seasonal forest
- Dry evergreen formations
  - Littoral woodland
- Montane formations
  - Lower montane forest
  - Montane forest
  - Elfin woodland
- Edaphic formations
  - Mangrove forest
  - Palm swamp
  - Seasonal swamp forest
  - Seasonal swamp savanna
  - Herbaceous swamp

== Terrestrial animal communities ==
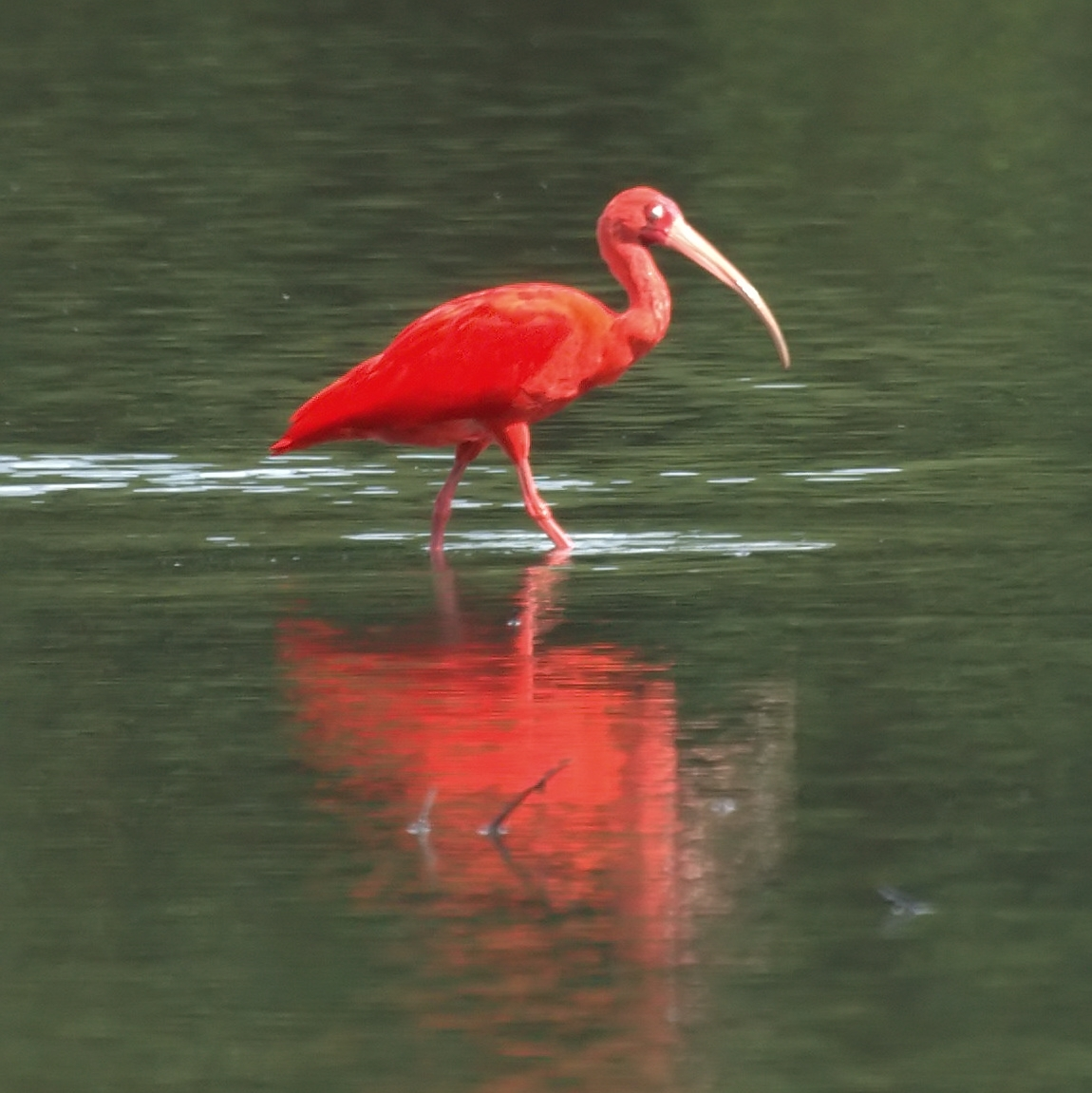
Scarlet Ibis is one of the national birds of T&T

=== Mammals ===
Trinidad and Tobago is home to about 99 species of terrestrial mammals. About 65 of the mammalian species in the islands are bats (including cave roosting, tree and cavity roosting bats and even foliage-tent-making bats; all with widely differing diets from nectar and fruit, to insects, small vertebrates such as fish, frogs, small birds and rodents and even those that consume vertebrate blood). The next most diverse group of mammals in the islands are the rodents. The largest of these rodents are the lowland paca, the long-tailed porcupine, and the red-rumped agouti (of these, only the agouti remains extant on Tobago). One squirrel (the red-tailed squirrel) and several native rats and mice are also part of the rodent fauna. A few species of opossums including the common opossum may be found on both islands.

Two anteaters, the southern tamandua and the silky anteater are found in Trinidad (but not in Tobago). The nine-banded armadillo can still be found on both islands. Native mammals of the order Carnivora include the ocelot, the tayra, the Neotropical river otter and the crab-eating raccoon (all four being found on Trinidad, with only the raccoon still extant on Tobago). The small Indian mongoose was introduced to Trinidad (but not to Tobago) during the later part of the 19th century and is now naturalized. The two native hoofed-mammals still found in Trinidad include the red brocket deer and the collared peccary (in Tobago, the deer is thought to be extirpated and the peccary is now fairly rare). The Guyanan red howler monkey and the Trinidad white-fronted capuchin are Trinidad's two native non-human primate species. The tufted capuchin monkey was introduced to the northwestern peninsula of Trinidad during World War II and is now naturalized there. No monkeys remain extant on Tobago. For comments on native aquatic mammals (namely manatees) and native marine mammals (whales and dolphins), see the appropriate sections below.

=== Birds ===
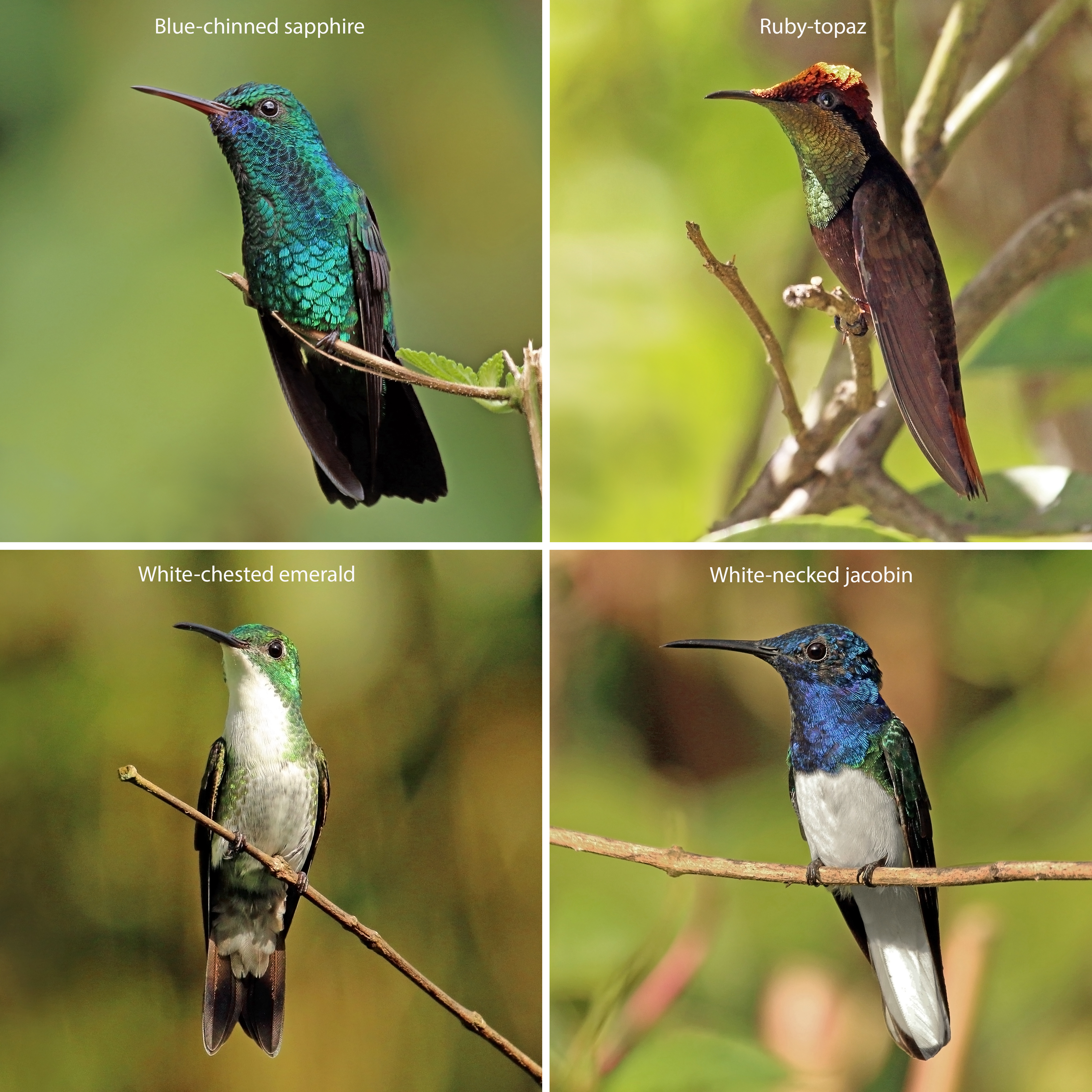
Hummingbirds of Trinidad and Tobago

472 species of birds have been recorded in Trinidad and Tobago (and the list of recorded species seems be still slowly increasing from year to year). There are few places in the world where so many birds can be seen in such a small area (with probably one of the highest bird species to area ratios of any country). Many of the species are very rare or are of particular interest. They range from the many species of hummingbirds to the primitive cave-dwelling oilbird (that uses sonar to fly in the dark) to the spectacularly beautiful scarlet ibis. The islands are within a few miles of Venezuela, and the species are therefore typical of tropical South America. However, the variety (although quite exceptional for such a small geographic area) is somewhat impoverished compared to the mainland, as would be expected with small islands.

The resident breeding birds are augmented in the northern winter by migrants from North America.

Tobago has only about half the number of bird species of Trinidad, but about 22 birds have been reported only from Tobago, including 12 breeding species.

The country hosts a few endemic avian subspecies and two endemic species (the critically endangered Trinidad piping guan found only in Trinidad, and the Trinidad motmot found on both islands, but more common in Tobago).

=== Amphibians and reptiles ===
The best sources of information regarding the recorded amphibians and reptiles of Trinidad and Tobago to date are Murphy (1997) and Boos (2001). Since those publications, a few new records as well as several taxonomic changes have been made (Murphy and Downie, 2012). The herpetofaunal list is at present in a state of flux, as taxonomy and systematics continue to be revised. To date (July 2014), the generally accepted recorded numbers of species of the various major groups of amphibians and reptiles are as follows:

Frogs and toads (Anura): 37 species in total for the country. (33 recorded from Trinidad and 15 recorded on Tobago, with 4 of those from Tobago not known from Trinidad, and 2 of those from Trinidad known from just one specimen each. There is one introduced species, known on both Trinidad and Tobago).

Caecilians (Gymnophiona): 1 species in total from Trinidad only. (Recorded from only 1 specimen).

Turtles, terrapins and tortoises (Chelonii): 14 species recorded in total for the country (All 14 recorded for Trinidad, and possibly 6 recorded for Tobago. Four species are marine, with at least 4 being noted off Tobago, with at least 3 of those regularly breeding on both islands. Four are confirmed native terrestrial system species of Trinidad (1 of these is possibly a waif on Tobago). One is possibly a long introduced species on both islands that is still present in the wild in some areas of Trinidad, but unconfirmed in the wild in Tobago. One is very recently introduced in Trinidad from North America and it is unconfirmed if it is breeding in the wild. Three are possibly occasional waifs to Trinidad from the nearby continent with no verified local breeding populations).

Crocodiles and alligators (Crocodylia): 4 species recorded in total for the country (two are known to be native and breeding on Trinidad, with one of those breeding in Tobago, while the other 2 were occasionally historically recorded as waifs).

Legless lizards (Amphisbaenia): 2 species from Trinidad only.

Lizards (Sauria): 31 confirmed records for the country in total (2 of those not yet 'officially' documented). (Of the 31 confirmed records, 27 are from Trinidad, with at least 7 relatively recent historical introductions with 1 of these subsequently assumed to have been extirpated. Nineteen are from Tobago, with at least 3 relatively recent historical introductions there. Four of those from Tobago are not found on Trinidad. In addition to the 31 confirmed records, there are at least 3 species records that are dubious).

Snakes (Serpentes): 50 accepted records for the country in total (1 of these not yet 'officially' documented). (Of these 50 records, 45 are from Trinidad and 22 are from Tobago, with 5 of those from Tobago not being recorded from Trinidad. Of the 50 records for the country, 7 species are known from just 1 or 2 records. In addition to the 50 generally accepted confirmed records, there are at least 2 dubious records).

A number of frogs and toads inhabit the islands, including the well known huge marine or cane toad (Rhinella marina), locally known as the crapaud on both islands, and the tiny colourful rare endemic species known as the El Tucuche golden tree frog (Phytotriades auratus), found only in the giant epiphitic bromeliads at the mist-shrouded summits of Trinidad's two highest peaks, as well as the Mount Tucuche tree frog (Flectonotus fitzgeraldi), found in the Northern and Central Ranges of Trinidad and throughout most of Tobago. In the same genus as the marine toad, the Rivero's toad (Rhinella beebei) is found in the cane fields, rice fields and other open agricultural areas of Trinidad (absent in Tobago). The strangest of all Trinidad's frogs is the highly aquatic Suriname toad or pipa toad (Pipa pipa), the tadpoles of which develop in the skin tissue of the mother's back, before bursting out and emerging as miniature replicas of the adult frogs. Another unusual frog found in Trinidad is the paradoxical frog (Pseudis paradoxa) in which the tadpoles of the species are approximately 25 cm long and the adults shrink to about 6.5 - 7.5 cm; this reduction of size from the tadpole to the sexually mature adult is how the species received its common name. The Amazon River frog (Lithobates palmipes) is found near ponds, slow flowing rivers and other permanent water sources, usually in tropical forests, in the Central Range of Trinidad (not located in Tobago). The giant tree frog (Boana boans), known locally as the giant flying frog, is commonly heard calling after dusk from the vegetation along forest-lined streams in Trinidad. Other frogs of the same genus include the banana tree dwelling frog (Boana platanera) (found on both islands), as well as the map tree frog (B. geographica) and the polka-dot tree frog (B. punctata) which are native to Trinidad, not Tobago.

Other frogs in the family Hylidae include species in the genus Dendropsophus (D. microcephalus, D. minusculus and D. minutus), the veined tree frog (Trachycephalus typhonius), the red snouted tree frog (Scinax ruber), the Orinoco lime tree frog (Sphaenorhynchus lacteus) and the Maracaibo Basin tree frog (Scarthyla vigilans). In the family Microhylidae, there are only two species found in Trinidad (not Tobago), both in the genus Elachistocleis: E. nigrogularis and E. surinamensis. The Trinidad leaf frog (Phyllomedusa trinitatis) can be found in the lowland forests, the edges of forest and montane rainforests in the northern region of Trinidad (not Tobago). The two frog species of the genus Mannophryne found diurnally active in forests along fast flowing mountain streams (one of which is endemic to Trinidad (M. trinitatis) and the other endemic to Tobago (M. olmonae)) both demonstrate a degree of parental care as the tadpoles are transported on the backs of the adult males before a suitable fairly predator-free body of water is found where they may be left to develop. Other frogs native to Tobago are the eastern glass frog (Hyalinobatrachium orientale) which can be found on leaves near streams, creeks or rivers and the Tobago litter frog (Pristimantis charlottevillensis) which is endemic to the island and is found near forest and grassland streams. The relatively recently introduced Grenadian 'tink' frog (Eleutherodactylus johnstonei) can be heard at night in loud metallic 'tinking' choruses in urban residential neighbourhood yards and parks from Diego Martin to Sangre Grande in Trinidad, and more recently in southwestern Tobago. The tungara frog or locally called the pung-la-la (Engystomops pustulosus) is commonly heard at night calling from wet grassy ditches in open habitats in both urban and rural areas on both islands and their foam nests are found even in small road and trail side puddles during the rainy season. Other frogs in the same family include Turpin's litter frog (Pristimantis turpinorum), Urich's litter frog (P. urichi) and the forest chirping frog (Adenomera hylaedactyla). Among these, only A. hylaedactyla and P. urichi is found on both islands while P. turpinorum is endemic to Tobago. The southwestern peninsula of Trinidad is home to a rather diverse community of frogs, including the Trinidad ditch frog (Leptodactylus nesiotus), originally known only from that area. In the same genus are L. fuscus, L. insularum, L. macrosternum and L. validus; of these, only L. fuscus and L. validus are found on both islands, while the other two are found in Trinidad. Trinidad may also be home to a caecilian (Typhlonectes species) (a legless highly aquatic amphibian with an eel-like body that is rarely observed due to its habitat specifications) although only one specimen has ever been scientifically documented from Trinidad.

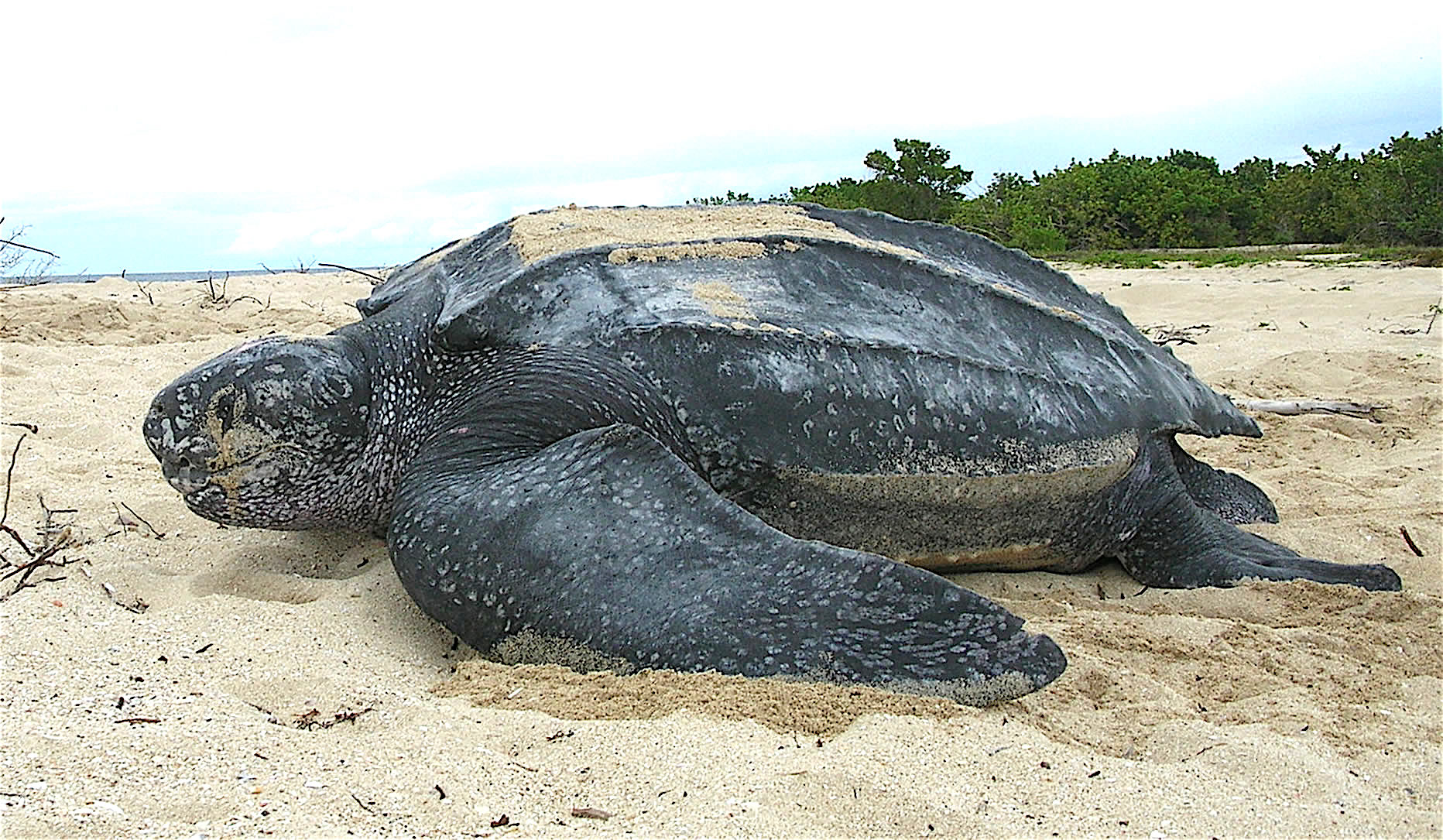
Trinidad and Tobago is a major nesting site for Leatherback Turtles

Terrapins, tortoises and marine turtles make their homes on and around these islands. The giant leatherback sea turtle (Dermochelys coriacea), the hawksbill sea turtle (Eretmochelys imbricata), the loggerhead sea turtle (Caretta caretta), the olive ridley sea turtle (Lepidochelys olivacea) and the green sea turtle (Chelonia mydas) are marine species that either nest on the islands' beaches or frequent their coastal waters. The toadhead turtle (Mesoclemmys gibba) is found in the south-western drainages of the South Oropouche catchment where it inhabits stagnant or slow-moving waters of marshes, ponds and streams in or near primary rainforests and gallery forests. The land dwelling yellow-footed tortoise (Chelonoidis denticulatus) or morrocoy as it is locally known and the possibly introduced red-footed tortoise (C. carbonarius) are threatened by high levels of poaching in Trinidad. The scorpion mud turtle (Kinosternon scorpioides) tends to prefer calm, fresh-water backwaters and isolated ponds of Trinidad (absent in Tobago). The painted wood-turtle, locally known as the galap (Rhinoclemmys punctularia), is found in and near rivers, streams and swamps in Trinidad, and has appeared on occasion as a waif on Tobago. The odd Orinoco mata mata turtle (Chelus orinocensis) is known as a waif (and is possibly a rare inhabitant) of the Nariva Swamp and other southern and eastern coastal river systems in Trinidad. Both the Arrau turtle (Podocnemis expansa) and the yellow-spotted Amazon river turtle (P. unifilis) are occasional accidental visitors to Trinidad due to heavy rain fall and increased flooding from mainland South America. The pond slider (Trachemys scripta) is considered amongst the world's 100 most invasive species and has been found in Trinidad as escaped or released pets, though they are not known to form a breeding population on the island.

All the marine turtle species are threatened by illegal hunting activity and as the bycatch of gillnet fishing. Nevertheless, there has been great success achieved by measures taken to educate the public and ensure species conservation since the 1970s. Beaches on Trinidad's northern and eastern coasts are noted among the top three internationally most important nesting grounds for leatherback sea turtles and a few community run conservation organizations help to maintain the nesting habitats, deter poaching and to bring sustainable revenue generated via ecotourism into their communities.

The spectacled caiman (Caiman crocodilus), which may grow up to a maximum of about 8 feet (2.4 m) in length, but are usually somewhat smaller, are to be found throughout both islands in slow moving freshwater (including reservoirs) or brackish water along the coasts. They are shy creatures and pose no real threat to humans unless intentionally provoked or approached while nesting. The Cuvier's dwarf caiman (Paleosuchus palpebrosus) is the smallest crocodilian species in the world, measuring a maximum of only 7 feet (2.1 m) in length, and is found on the island of Trinidad (absent in Tobago) where it inhabits forested riverine habitats and areas of the flooded forest around lakes. They prefer rivers and streams with fast-flowing water. It is generally considered that the few records of both the American crocodile (Crocodylus acutus) as well as the Orinoco crocodile (C. intermedius) in the waters and on the coasts of Trinidad and Tobago were, for the most part, waifs from mainland South America.

There are two species of legless lizards, Amphisbaena alba and A. fuliginosa, known as 'two headed' snakes on Trinidad. They spend much of their lives burrowing in the soil in forest or forest-edge areas and are often associated with the nests of leaf-cutter ants Atta, which form part of their diet.

There are a number of lizards ranging in size from just over an inch or two in length to the huge 6-foot (1.8 m) long green iguana (Iguana iguana). The so-called luminous lizard (Oreosaurus shrevei) makes its home in primary lower montane and montane forest at the mouths of caves and cool stream banks on the high peaks, ridges and high valleys of the Northern Range of Trinidad and is found nowhere else on earth. Found in forest, forest edge and savanna habitats, the cryptic golden tegu (Tupinambis cryptus) or matte or salipenter as it is locally called, and the green iguana (still fairly common, even in some sub-urban areas) are considered delicacies on both Trinidad and Tobago. Plica caribeana is found on tree trunks, rocks and infrastructure in primary and secondary forests on both islands.

A number of anole species (Anolis) may be easily observed, even in suburban areas, which include A. aeneus, A. cristatellus, A. extremus, A. richardii, A. sagrei, A. trinitatis and A. wattsii. Only A. planiceps is a Trinidad native, with all the other previous anoles mentioned being relatively recent or historically introduced. A. tigrinus appears to be a central Venezuelan Coastal Range-Tobago endemic. However, we also have photographic evidence that A. tigrinus is present on Trinidad. Whether the first (and so far, only) documented record of A. auratus from southwest Trinidad in 2023 is considered a very rare native species that has gone unnoticed or a recent introduction is yet to be determined.

Other common lizards include macro-teiids (or whip-tailed lizards) such as Ameiva atrigularis (locally called the zandoli or ground lizard and common even in suburban gardens), Cnemidophorus lemniscatus (most readily seen along some coastal areas of southwestern Tobago and on Trinidad's east and south coasts and on the islands of Chacachacare, Huevos, Little Tobago and Goat Island) and Kentropyx striata (found in open savannas and inland freshwater wetlands of Trinidad, not Tobago). Audubon's multicoloured lizard (Polychrus auduboni) is found in the semi-deciduous forests, evergreen montane forests and some disturbed areas of both islands. Among the micro-teiids (or spectacled lizards), Bachia trinitatis can be found on both islands, B. heteropa is found in Trinidad and B. whitei being endemic to Tobago. Other microteiids include Underwood's spectacled tegu (Gymnophthalmus underwoodi) which is found in open areas such as parks and gardens on both islands, and the golden spectacled tegu (G. speciosus) which is found on the, now uninhabited, island of Chacachacare, off the coast of Trinidad.

The Greater Windward skink (Copeoglossum aurae) is a species of skink (described in 2012) found in the rainforest areas, coconut trash, and cultivated and disturbed areas of both Trinidad and Tobago. The Lesser Windward skink (Marisora aurulae), also described in 2012, is sympatric with C. aurae (in Tobago). The black-spotted skink (C. nigropunctatum) is in the same genus as the Greater Windward skink and also shares similar habitats with its relative in Trinidad (not Tobago). Nocturnally active geckos of the genera Hemidactylus and Thecadactylus are common in old and rural buildings on both islands and are commonly referred to as mabouyas and wood slaves respectively. These include Hemidactylus mabouia, H. palaichthus and Thecadactylus rapicauda. There are a number of small colourful diurnal geckos of the genus Gonatodes present. One of them, G. ocellatus is endemic to forests and edge habitats of northeastern Tobago while another, G. vittatus or the streak lizard as it is locally known, is very common and can be seen in most suburban and even urban backyards in Trinidad (and is probably relatively recently introduced to some parts Tobago associated with human occupation). G. ceciliae is also found in forest and edge habitats in the Northern and Central Ranges of Trinidad, as well as the Bocas Islands. G. humeralis can be found in riverine forests of both islands.

There are some records of G. albogularis from Trinidad and Tobago, but as of 2018 it is believed that these are in error and based on misidentifications with G. vittatus. The tiny Mole's gecko Sphaerodactylus molei is found on both islands and is among the smallest of lizards in the world.

Included among the country's snake fauna are some of the very smallest in the world (the fossorial Guyana blind snake, Epictia tenella, and other blind snakes [two in the genus Amerotyphlops, the Brongersma's worm snake, A. brongersmianus, and the Trinidad burrowing snake, A. trinitatus, and one species possibly in the genus Helminthophis]), to the very largest of snakes in the world (the green anaconda). Anacondas (locally called the huille) have been historically found around streams, rivers and swamps in southern and eastern Trinidad, and recently also in the Caroni River drainage system. They have not been reported from Tobago. Three other boas, namely Boa constrictor (locally called the macajuel), Corallus ruschenbergerii (a tree boa locally called the cascabel dormilon) and Epicrates maurus (a rainbow boa) are found in forest and forest edge habitats throughout both islands (with the last even being common in some urban areas). Several harmless snakes in the subfamilies Colubrinae and Dipsadinae are found throughout the islands. Some of the larger examples of the diurnal Colubrinae include Spilotes pullatus (locally called the tigre in Trinidad and the black snake in Tobago) found in forest and forest edge habitats, and the rarer more forest dwelling Drymarchon corais (or yellow-tailed cribo) can be found on both islands.

Smaller well known members of the subfamily include the machete couesse (Mastigodryas boddaerti on Trinidad, and Mastigodryas dunni endemic to Tobago) and the horsewhip (Oxybelis aeneus) and are common in forest and forest edge habitats, even in some suburban areas of both islands. Among the Colubrinae, the loras Leptophis stimsoni and Leptophis haileyi are endemics to Trinidad's Northern Range and Tobago's Main Ridge respectively. Another member of the genus found on both islands is Leptophis ahaetulla.

Many of the members of the subfamily Dipsadinae are typically nocturnal and some of the more commonly observed species present even in suburban areas on both islands are the false mapepire (Leptodeira annulata ashmeadi) and the slug-eating snake (Sibon nebulata). Other interesting Dipsadinae include the water mapepire (Helicops angulatus) a habitat specialist of freshwater and brackish water systems of lowland Trinidad, the mainly diurnal beh belle chemin (Erythrolamprus melanotus nesos) of forest and edge habitats on both islands, the false coral snakes (Erythrolamprus aesculapii and Erythrolamprus bizona) that are also found in forest and edge habitats of Trinidad only and the rare crepuscular red snake (Erythrolamprus ocellatus) endemic to the forest and edge habitats of northeastern Tobago. There are no dangerous venomous snakes on Tobago. There are only four dangerous venomous snakes on Trinidad. These include two vipers, and two coral snakes. The vipers (the true mapepires) are the mapepire balsain (Bothrops atrox) and the mapepire zanana (Lachesis muta muta). The former is fairly common in primary and secondary forested areas of Trinidad (particularly so in the Northern Range), and the later is a very rarely encountered primary rainforest specialist in Trinidad. The two coral snakes are the small coral snake (Micrurus circinalis, and the Trinidad ribbon coral snake (Micrurus diutius), both associated with forested areas, and the later sometimes being associated with swampy habitats in Trinidad.

Fatal venomous snake bite accidents in Trinidad are fairly uncommon. It is unfortunate to note that although all snakes (with the exception of the potentially dangerous vipers and corals) are protected by law in Trinidad and Tobago, the human population at large is not generally tolerant of snakes, and even harmless snakes found near human dwellings, farms and gardens are often killed on sight. More public awareness is needed to dispel misconceptions about snakes as well as to sensitize the population to the ecological importance of snakes.

=== Invertebrates ===
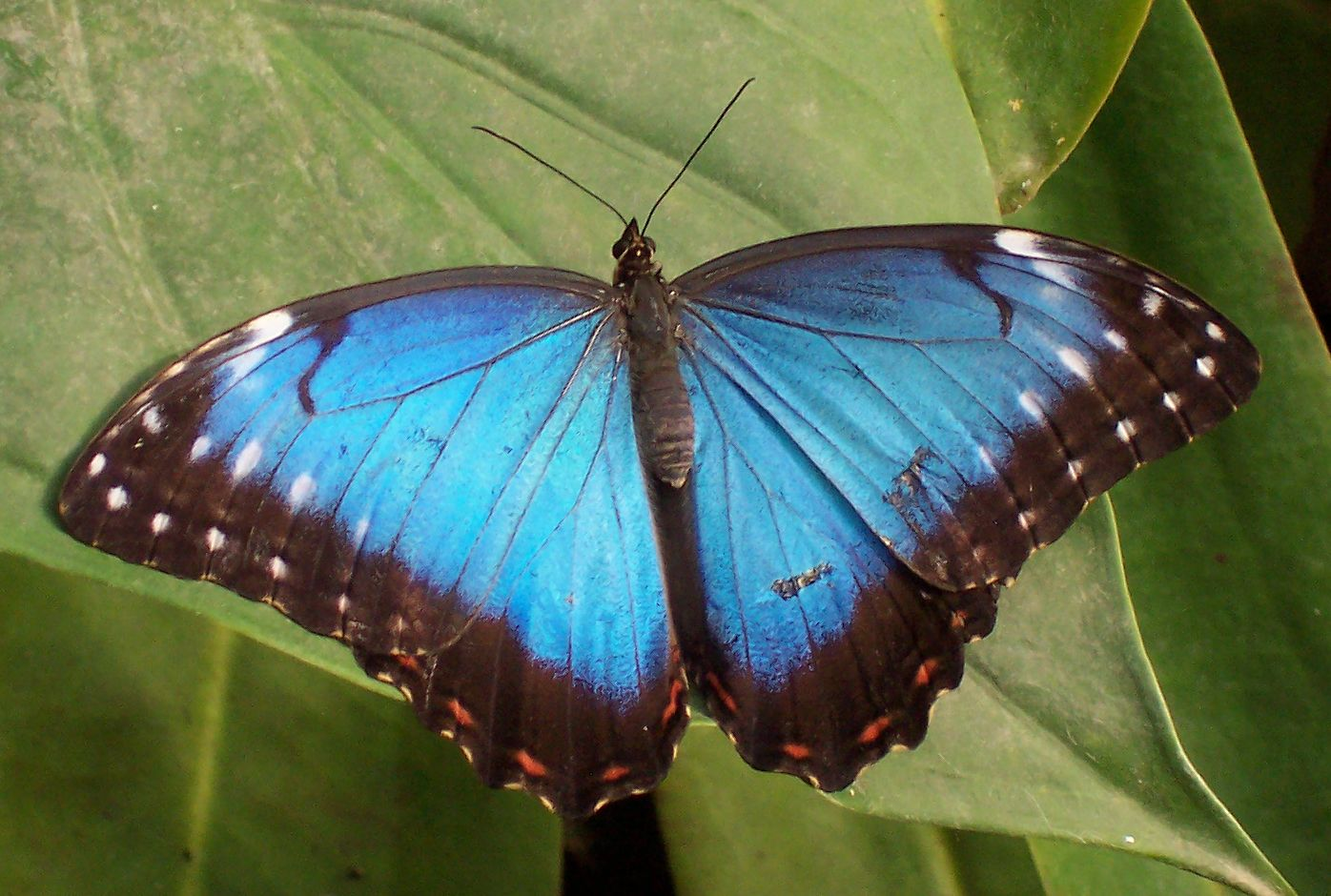
Morpho peleides (morpho butterfly)

Trinidad and Tobago are extremely rich in neotropical invertebrate fauna. Several hundred species of butterflies, including the brilliant blue emperor butterfly (Morpho peleides), and beetles are to be found on the islands, many in the tropical forests. Barcant (1970) lists 617 species of butterfly for the two islands of which 123 occur on Tobago. The leafcutter ants (Acromyrmex octospinosus and Atta cephalotes) are easily observed, even in suburban environments. Soldier ants may be observed in forested areas. The largest specimens of centipedes (genus Scolopendra) (over 10 inches (250 mm) long) may be found particularly in the drier forests of the Northwestern Peninsular of Trinidad (the Chaguaramas Peninsular) as well as the nearby tiny off shore islands such as the giant centipede (Scolopendra gigantea), the largest centipede species in the world. A few species of large tarantulas may be found in forested areas and even in houses at the forest edge such as the Trinidad chevron tarantula (Psalmopoeus cambridgei), as well as the Trinidad dwarf tarantula (Cyriocosmus elegans) and the pinktoe tarantula (Avicularia avicularia). The arthropod life of Trinidad and Tobago has not been well studied and it is an entomologist's paradise waiting to be discovered, with many species remaining undocumented.

There are approximately 70 species of land snails ranging in size from the giant South American land snail (Megalobulimus oblongus) to the tiny Gastrocopta snails.

Many species of crustaceans (terrestrial, freshwater and marine) are among the other invertebrates that may be easily observed in Trinidad and Tobago such as the Caribbean hermit crab (Coenobita clypeatus), stream crayfish (Macrobrachium crenulatum) and spotted spiny lobster (Panulirus guttatus).

There are nine species of scorpions in Trinidad and Tobago including the medically important Trinidad thick-tailed scorpion (Tityus trinitatis) and slender-tailed scorpion (Tityus tenuicauda).

== Aquatic communities ==
There are a number of wetland habitats on both Trinidad and Tobago that foster vital aquatic ecosystems.

The Bon Accord Lagoon on Tobago is a vital mangrove habitat and home to a population of spectacled caimans as well as a number of wetland bird species.

The Caroni Swamp on the west coast of Trinidad has a fairly high level of salinity (compared to other major wetlands on the island) and is an important breeding and feeding habitat for several bird species (including magnificent flocks of scarlet ibis (one of the National Birds)) and several marine fishes and invertebrates.

The Nariva Swamp of the east coast is the largest freshwater swamp on Trinidad and has a Ramsar Convention status of wetland of international importance. It and its associated river system of canals and rivers is home to a vast array of aquatic life, including a very small population of the highly endangered West Indian manatee, the green anaconda, the spectacled caiman, the mata mata turtle and the common Suriname toad. The plant community in the swamp include various mangroves, moriche palms and bloodwood trees.

There are many small rivers and streams throughout the islands. Over 40 species of freshwater fish have been recorded in Trinidad and Tobago. The world-famous guppy is a common native fish; particularly so in the mountain streams of Trinidad, where it has served as a model organism for several important ecological and evolutionary studies.

== Marine communities ==
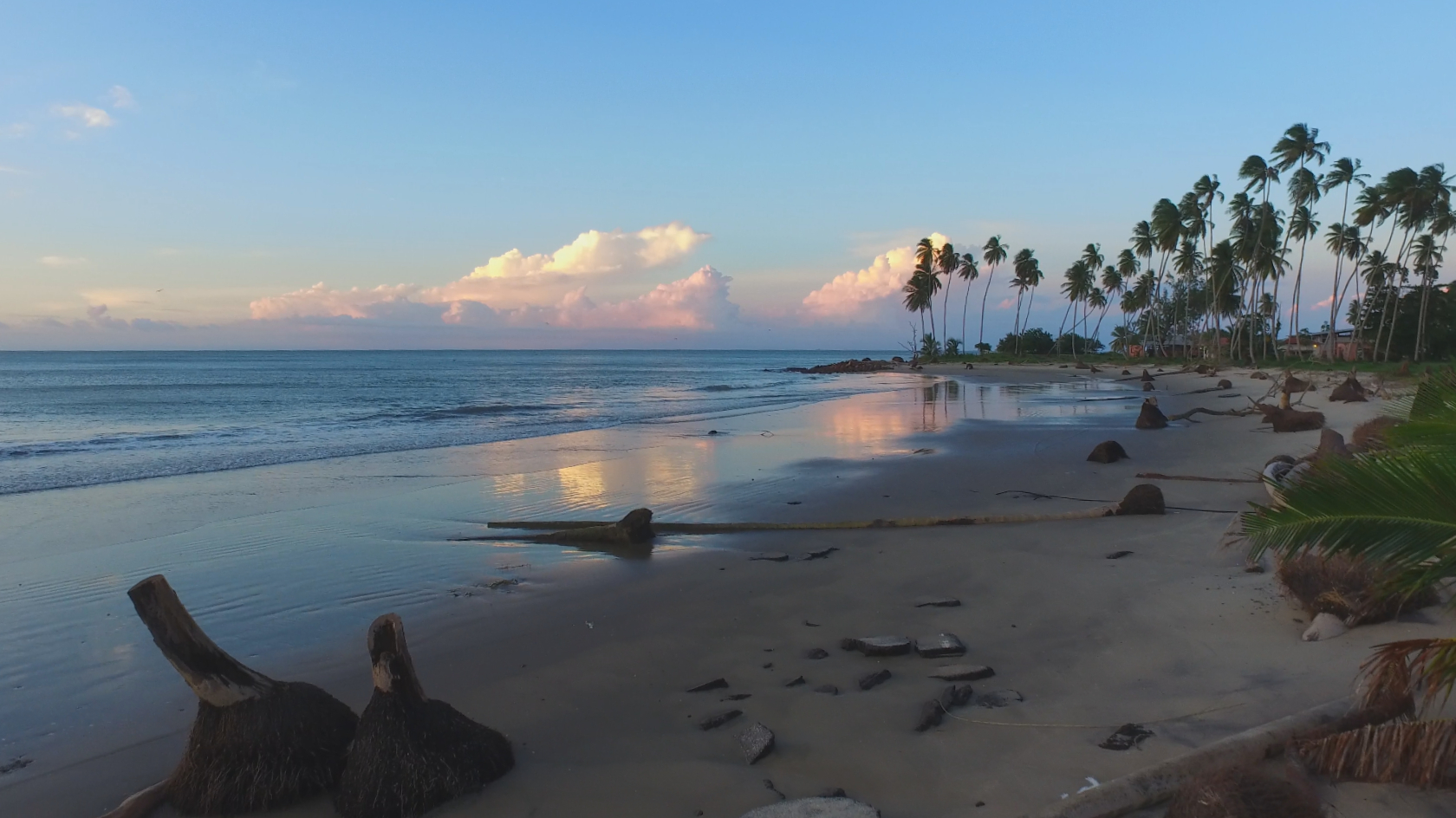
Coral Point, on the south of Trinidad

Trinidad's western and southern coastal waters are highly influenced by the outflow of freshwater from the adjacent Orinoco River of Venezuela which is less than 8 miles (13 km) away from Trinidad at the closest point. As such, the waters here are fairly low in salinity and high in sediment/nutrient content and relatively shallow. These facts coupled with the highly sheltered nature of the Gulf of Paria and the Columbus Channel respectively, create ideal breeding/spawning grounds for many marine fishes and invertebrates, including shrimp.

Various 'sporting' fish are present in the waters of both islands and include huge grouper, marlin, barracuda and dolphin-fish. Fish popularly caught and eaten include carite, kingfish and red snapper.

As mentioned in the section above on the reptilian fauna of Trinidad and Tobago, a number of species of marine turtles including the leatherback turtle, hawksbill turtle, loggerhead turtle, olive ridley turtle and green sea turtle frequent the waters around and/or nest on some of the beaches of both islands.

Whales and dolphins were far more common to Trinidad and Tobago's waters in earlier times, but the very rigorous whaling industry of the 19th century decimated the population of whales in the Gulf of Paria (called 'Golfo de Balena' or Gulf of Whales by Christopher Columbus). Today, dolphins may still be regularly observed, particularly off the shore of the northwestern Chaguaramas peninsula. Pilot whales have been observed to beach themselves on a few occasions during the 1990s and a small pod of killer whales were caught in a fisherman's net during the 1980s.

Whale sharks (the largest of all fishes) have been observed around the oil rigs in the southern part of the Gulf of Paria. Hammerhead sharks are commonly caught by fishermen and shark flesh is considered a delicacy among the human population of both islands.

The waters of Tobago are less affected by the outflow of fresh water from the Orinoco and as such are far more saline and clearer than that of Trinidad. A number of coral reefs are thus able to exist around Tobago, the most famous being the Buccoo Reef. Tobago's reefs are reputedly home to the largest examples of brain coral. Also present are huge and gentle manta rays, impressive moray eels, parrot fish, angel fish and a host of other colourful tropical coral reef species.

== See also ==
- List of mammals of Trinidad and Tobago

== Bibliography ==
- Barcant M (1970). Butterflies of Trinidad and Tobago. Collins, London.
- Beard, J. S. (1946) The Natural Vegetation of Trinidad. Oxford University Press, Oxford.
- Boos, H.E.A. 2001. The Snakes of Trinidad and Tobago. Texas University Press. College Station, Texas. 270 pp.
- Murphy, J.C. 1997. Amphibians and Reptiles of Trinidad and Tobago. Krieger. Malabar, Florida. 245 pp.
- Murphy, J.C. and J.R. Downie. 2012. "The changing Trinidad and Tobago herpetofauna". Living World, Journal of the Trinidad and Tobago Field Naturalists’ Club 2012: 87–95.
