= Little Tobago =

Island off the north-east coast of Tobago

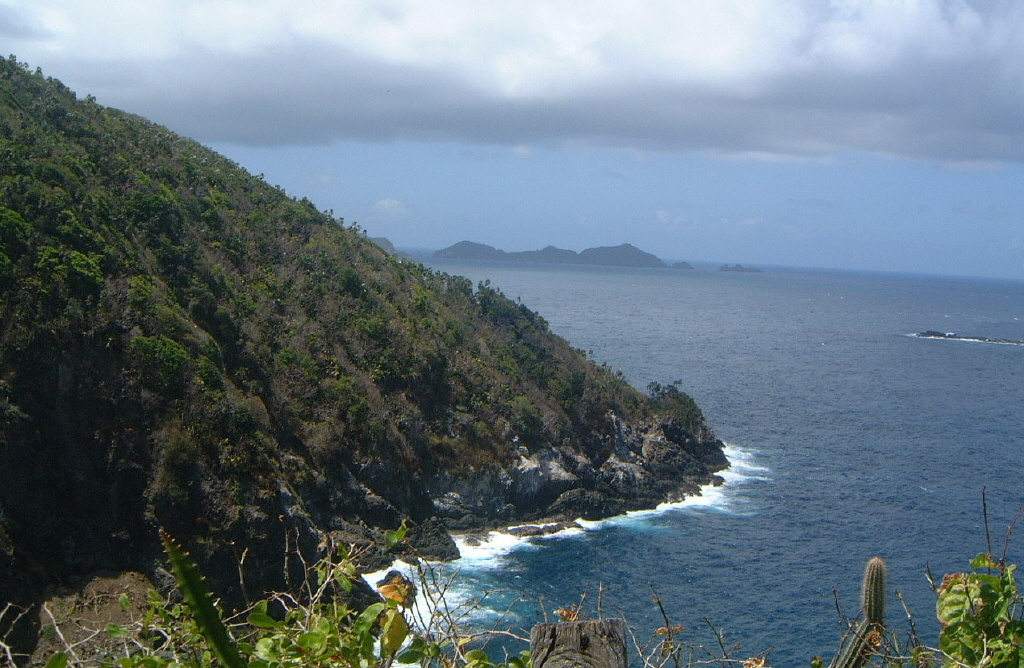
- View of Saint Giles Island from Little Tobago

- Location within Trinidad and Tobago

Geography
- Location: Caribbean Sea
- Coordinates: 11°18′N 60°31′W
- Archipelago: Lesser Antilles
- Adjacent to: Caribbean Sea, Atlantic Ocean
- Area: 1 km^{2} (0.39 sq mi)
- Length: 1.9 km (1.18 mi)
- Width: 1.4 km (0.87 mi)
- Highest elevation: 37 m (121 ft)

Administration
- Trinidad and Tobago
- Ward: Tobago
- Parish: St. John

Additional information
- Time zone: Atlantic Standard Time (UTC-4)

Little Tobago (or Bird of Paradise Island) is a small island off the north-eastern coast of Tobago, and part of the Republic of Trinidad and Tobago.

== Environment ==
The sea between Tobago and Little Tobago is shallow, and glass-bottomed boats enable the attractive corals and brightly coloured tropical fish to be seen on the crossing. It is a popular area for snorkelling and diving, especially on Angel Reef in front of Goat Island.

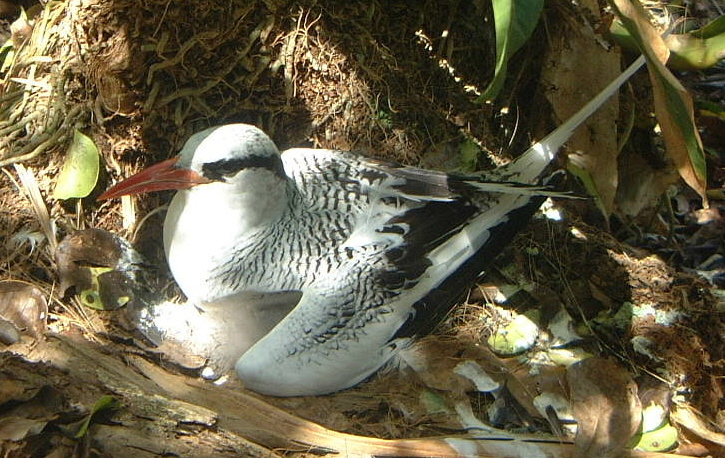
Red-billed tropicbird nest on Little Tobago

Little Tobago is covered with dry forest. The island is an important breeding site for seabirds such as red-billed tropicbirds, Sargasso shearwaters, brown boobies, laughing gulls, brown noddies, sooty and bridled terns. A few pairs of white-tailed tropicbirds also nest there. It is also a good site from which to see birds which breed on neighbouring islets, including red-footed boobies and magnificent frigatebirds. The latter species is frequently seen harassing the tropicbirds, boobies and terns. The island has been designated an Important Bird Area (IBA) by BirdLife International because, as well as breeding seabirds, it supports significant populations of rufous-vented chachalacas and copper-rumped hummingbirds.

A few species of reptiles have been recorded on Little Tobago. Among them are lizards such as green iguanas, giant ameivas, rainbow whiptails, Antilles leaf-toed geckos, turnip-tailed geckos, eyespot geckos, Mole's geckos and Allen's bachias. Snakes include Boddaert's tropical racers and Oliver's parrot snakes.

Among the more conspicuous of the invertebrate fauna on the island are large terrestrial hermit crabs.

== History ==
In 1908 the British politician and businessman Sir William Ingram purchased Little Tobago in order to turn it into a bird sanctuary. The next year he introduced the greater bird of paradise (Paradisaea apoda) to the island in an attempt to save the species from overhunting for the plume trade in its native New Guinea. The bird's plumage was particularly fashionable in women's hats. Forty-seven juvenile birds were introduced to the island, having been transported on a German ocean liner.

After Ingram's death in 1924 his heirs deeded the island to the Government of Trinidad and Tobago as a wildlife sanctuary. The birds survived on the island until at least 1958 when they were filmed by a National Geographic crew. There are no reliable records after 1963 when Hurricane Flora hit the island and the population is presumed to be extinct.

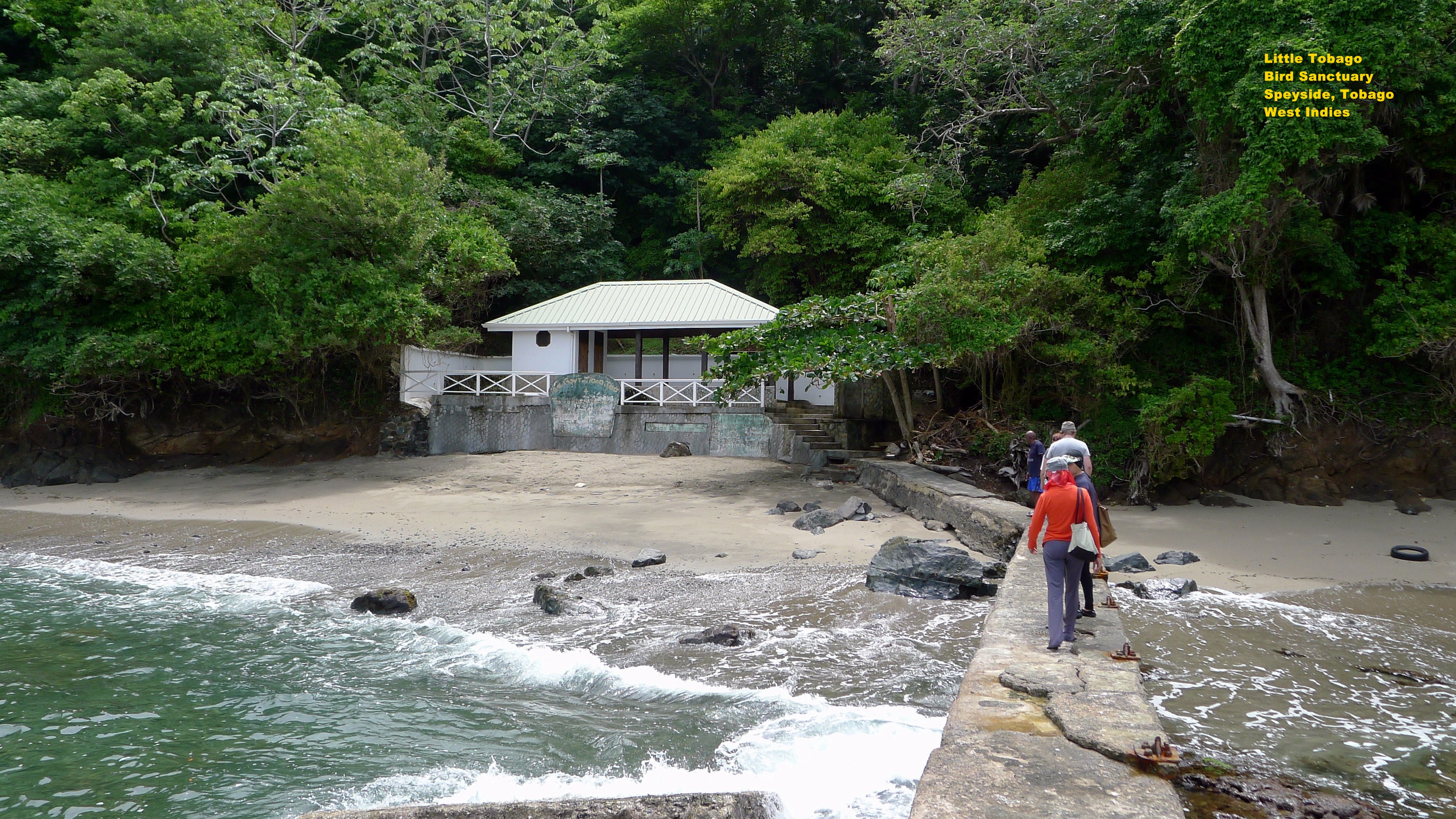
Little Tobago scene

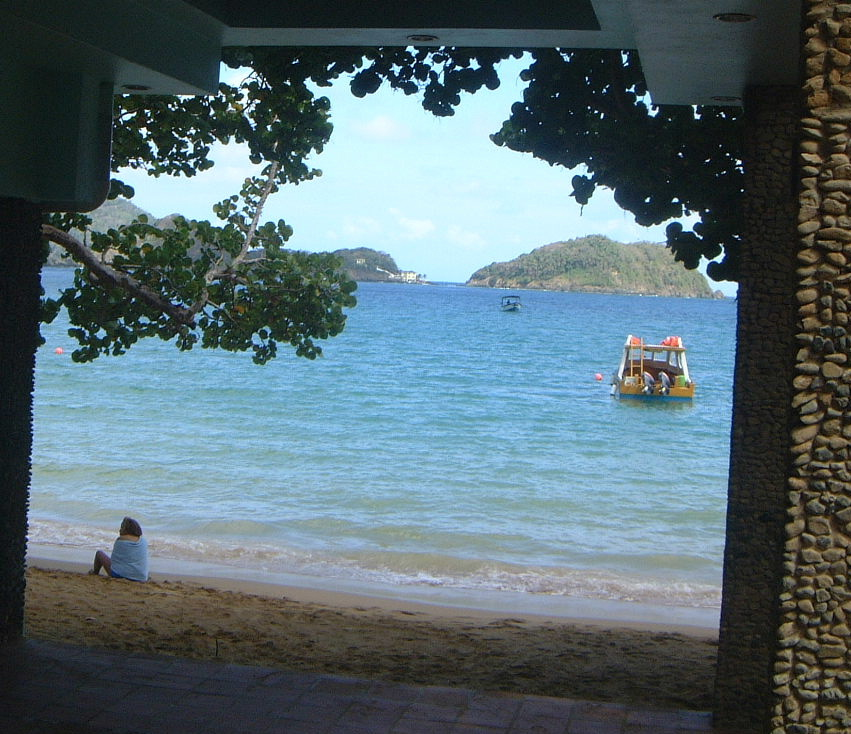
View of Little Tobago from Tobago, with Goat Island on right

== See also ==
- Islands of Trinidad and Tobago
