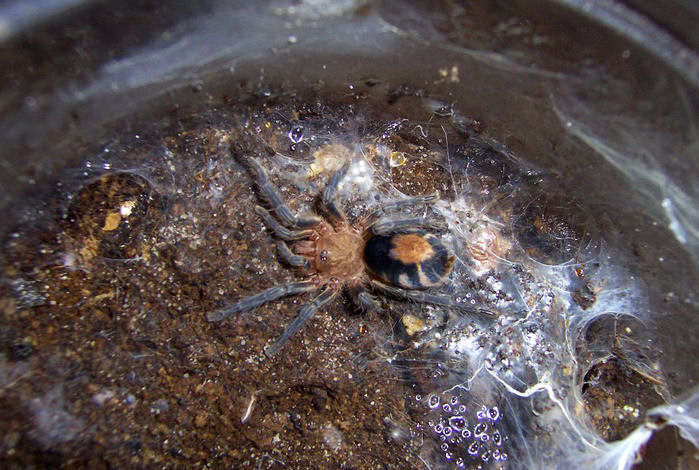

Scientific classification
- Kingdom: Animalia
- Phylum: Arthropoda
- Subphylum: Chelicerata
- Class: Arachnida
- Order: Araneae
- Infraorder: Mygalomorphae
- Family: Theraphosidae
- Genus: Cyriocosmus
- Species: C. perezmilesi

Binomial name
- Cyriocosmus perezmilesi Kaderka, 2007

= Cyriocosmus perezmilesi =

Species of tarantula

Cyriocosmus perezmilesi otherwise known as the Bolivian dwarf beauty tarantula is a spider which was first described by Radan Kaderka in 2007. It was named in honor of the Uruguayan entomologist Dr. Fernando Pérez-Miles, and is a fossorial tarantula. As its common name aptly states it is found in Bolivia; it is also known from the border region of southeastern Peru. It inhabits lowland Amazon rainforest habitats.

== Description ==
Females live 15 years, while males live 5 to 6. Their carapace is a copper color, with a black opisthosoma with a heart shape urticating patch in the middle. With 8 vertical lines ranging from the bottom of the opisthosoma almost meeting the urticating patch. Their legs are a grey color, or a black depending.

== Habitat ==
They are found in the tropical areas of Bolivia, their type location being near the Beni River in the Beni Department. They are also recorded from the Peruvian Amazon of the Madre de Dios Department. The average temperatures are 22 °C, with average yearly rainfall of 1,200mm, and an average height above sea level of 150m.

== Behavior ==
They are a very calm species, rarely throwing any urticating hairs, or making a threat pose. They are a fossorial species which enjoys to burrow, and they also web a fair bit, they are quite active and usually visible.
