= Cyriocosmus leetzi =

Scientific classification
- Kingdom: Animalia
- Phylum: Arthropoda
- Subphylum: Chelicerata
- Class: Arachnida
- Order: Araneae
- Infraorder: Mygalomorphae
- Family: Theraphosidae
- Genus: Cyriocosmus
- Species: C. leetzi

Binomial name
- Cyriocosmus leetzi Vol, 1999

Species of tarantula

Cyriocosmus leetzi also known as the Colombian dwarf tiger or Venezuelan dwarf beauty tarantula is a tarantula which was first described by Fabian Vol in 1999. As its common names may suggest it is found in Colombia, with some people stating it is also found in Venezuela.

== Description ==
Females live from 5 to 7 years, while males live 2 to 3 years. They own a reddish brown carapace, and their opisthosoma has a reddish orange color with 8 black lines radiating from the center of the opisthosoma. They own black or grayish legs covered in light grey hairs, which also cover the opisthosoma. All of this make them look quite similar to Cyriocosmus nicholausgordoni.

== Habitat ==
One of the places this species have been found is in Aguazul, Colombia, the region being very humid, and a tropical rainforest. Average temperatures of this area are 25°C with average yearly rainfall of 1000mm to 3200mm depending on the area.

== Behaviour ==
This species is known for being docile, and they also web quite a lot, being able to make complex tunnels. Whenever they feel scared, they would rather bolt to their hide instead of hiding or throwing hairs.
