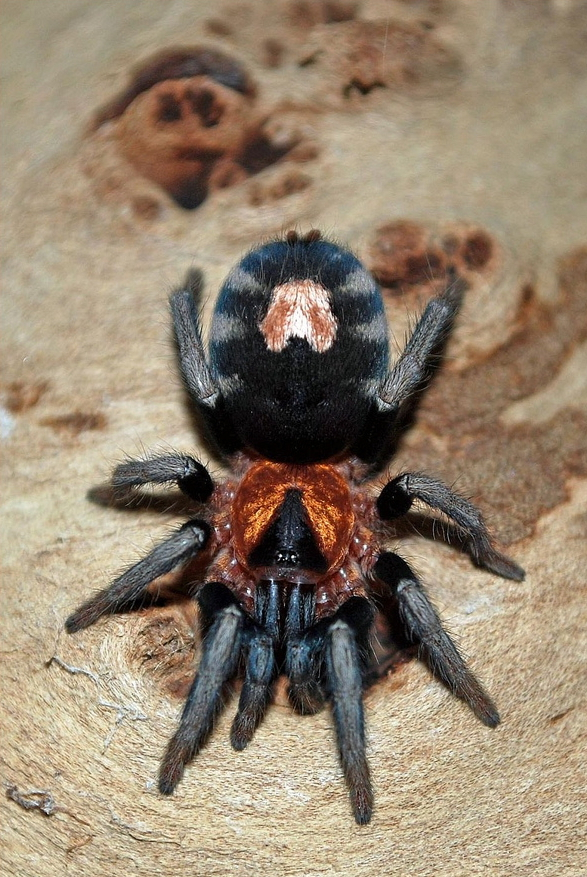
- female Cyriocosmus elegans
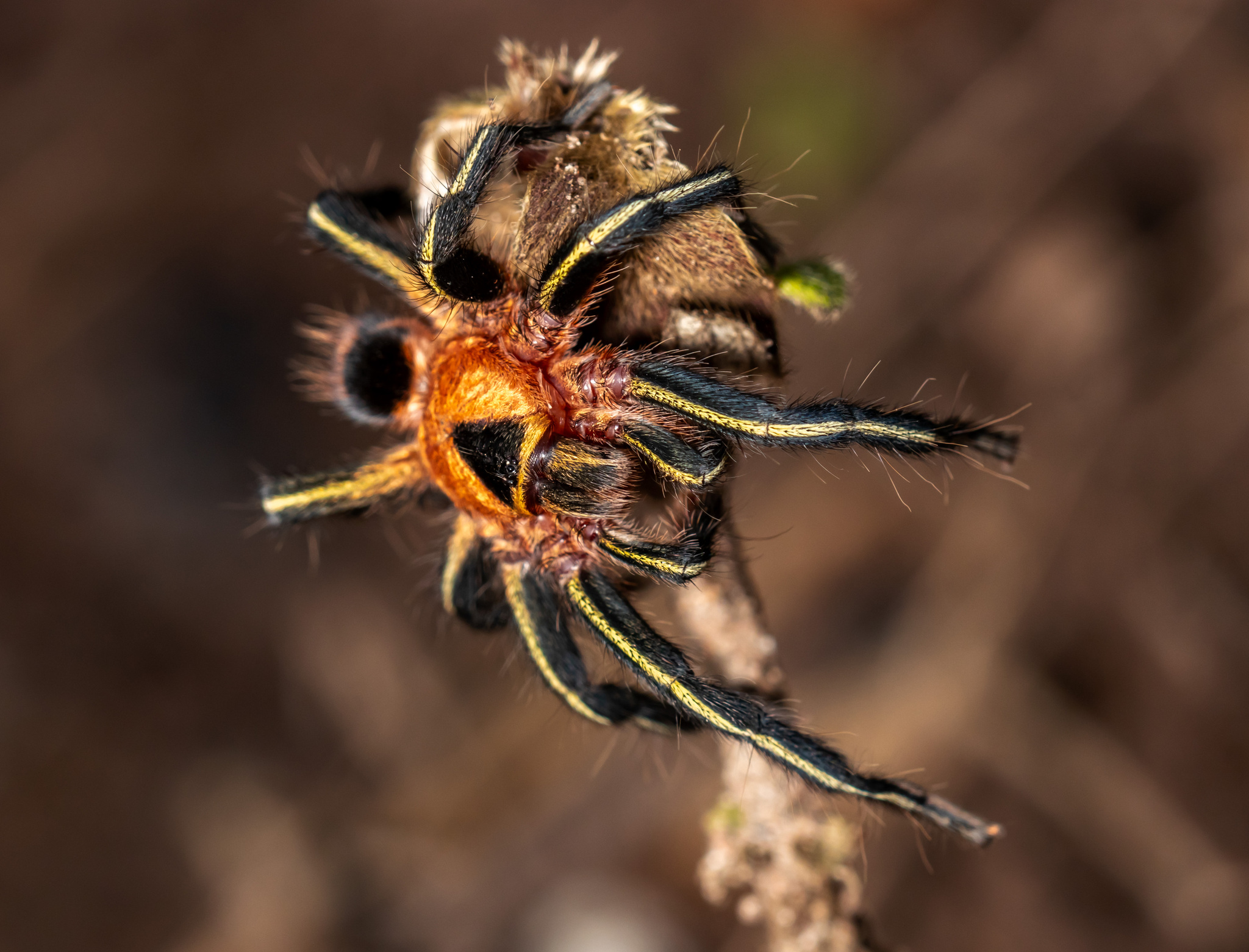
- male C. fasciatus in Brazil

Scientific classification
- Kingdom: Animalia
- Phylum: Arthropoda
- Subphylum: Chelicerata
- Class: Arachnida
- Order: Araneae
- Infraorder: Mygalomorphae
- Family: Theraphosidae
- Genus: Cyriocosmus; Simon, 1903

Type species
- C. sellatus (Simon, 1889)

Species
- 24, see text

Synonyms
- Erythropoicila Fischel, 1927; Pseudohomoeomma Mello-Leitão, 1930

= Cyriocosmus =

Genus of spiders

Cyriocosmus is a genus of tarantulas that was first described by Eugène Louis Simon in 1903. They are small to medium spiders, with a bicolored or one same color carapace.

== Diagnosis ==
The genus differs from all other tarantulas by the paraembolic apophysis in the palpal bulbs of males, and a spermatheca with two spiral receptacles, which usually end in a caliciform or globular extension. Except for C. nogueiranetoi, which owns a S shape extension. All the species also own type 3 urticating hairs.

== Species ==
As of January 2026, this genus includes 24 species:

- Cyriocosmus aueri Kaderka, 2016 – Peru
- Cyriocosmus bertae Pérez-Miles, 1998 – Brazil
- Cyriocosmus bicolor (Schiapelli & Gerschman, 1945) – Brazil
- Cyriocosmus blenginii Pérez-Miles, 1998 – Bolivia
- Cyriocosmus elegans (Simon, 1889) – Venezuela, Trinidad and Tobago, Guyana
- Cyriocosmus fasciatus (Mello-Leitão, 1930) – Brazil
- Cyriocosmus fernandoi Fukushima, Bertani & Silva, 2005 – Brazil
- Cyriocosmus foliatus Kaderka, 2019 – Peru
- Cyriocosmus giganteus Kaderka, 2016 – Peru
- Cyriocosmus hoeferi Kaderka, 2016 – Brazil
- Cyriocosmus itayensis Kaderka, 2016 – Peru
- Cyriocosmus leetzi Vol, 1999 – Colombia, Venezuela
- Cyriocosmus nicholausgordoni Kaderka, 2016 – Venezuela
- Cyriocosmus nogueiranetoi Fukushima, Bertani & Silva, 2005 – Brazil
- Cyriocosmus paredesi Kaderka, 2019 – Peru
- Cyriocosmus paresi Moeller, Galleti-Lima & Guadanucci, 2024 – Brazil
- Cyriocosmus perezmilesi Kaderka, 2007 – Bolivia
- Cyriocosmus peruvianus Kaderka, 2016 – Peru
- Cyriocosmus pribiki Pérez-Miles & Weinmann, 2009 – Peru
- Cyriocosmus ritae Pérez-Miles, 1998 – Peru, Brazil
- Cyriocosmus sellatus (Simon, 1889) – Peru, Brazil
- Cyriocosmus venezuelensis Kaderka, 2010 – Venezuela
- Cyriocosmus versicolor (Simon, 1897) – Brazil, Paraguay, Argentina
- Cyriocosmus williamlamari Kaderka, 2016 – Venezuela

=== In synonymy ===
- C. chicoi Pérez-Miles, 1998 = Cyriocosmus bicolor
- C. planus (Fischel, 1927) = Cyriocosmus elegans
- C. rogerioi Pérez-Miles & Weinmann, 2009 = Cyriocosmus pribiki
- C. semifasciatus Mello-Leitão, 1939 = Cyriocosmus elegans

=== Transferred to other genera ===
- Cyriocosmus butantan Pérez-Miles, 1998 → Hapalopus butantan
- Cyriocosmus nigriventris Mello-Leitão, 1939 → Hapalopus nigriventris
