= Goat Island (Trinidad and Tobago) =

Island in Trinidad and Tobago

Coordinates: 11°18′N 60°31′W

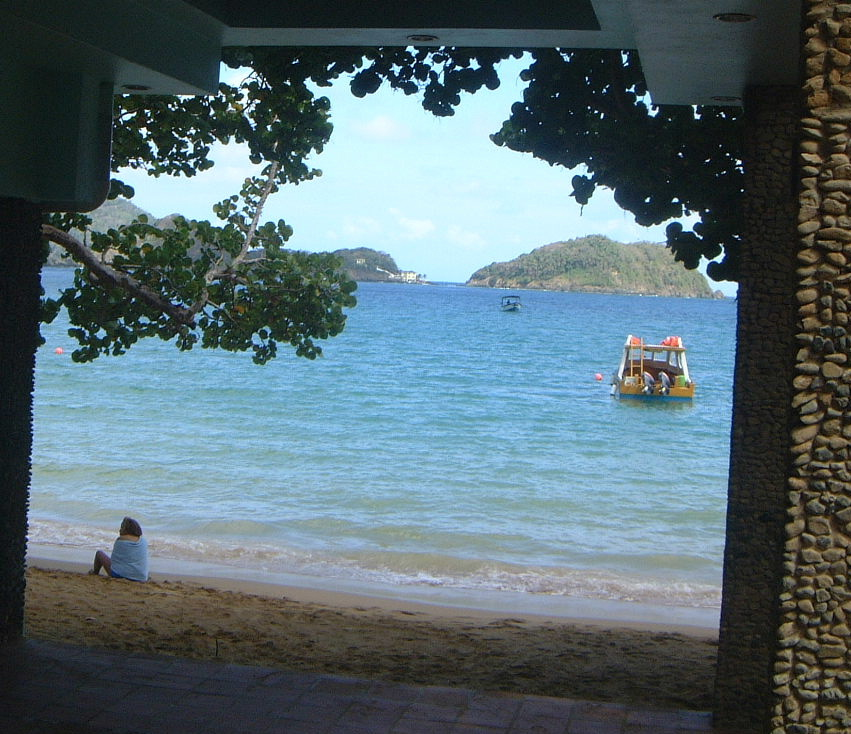
- View of Goat Island (center) and Little Tobago (right) from Blue Waters Inn, Speyside, Tobago

Geography
- Location: Caribbean Sea
- Area: 52,836.4 m^{2} (568,726 sq ft)
- Length: 655.97 m (2152.13 ft)
- Width: 355.85 m (1167.49 ft)
- Coastline: 2.2 km (1.37 mi)

Administration
- Trinidad and Tobago
- Ward: Tobago
- Parish: St. John
- Capital city: Port of Spain
- Largest settlement: Chaguanas
- President: Anthony Carmona

Demographics
- Population: 0
- Pop. density: 0/km^{2} (0/sq mi)
- Languages: English

Additional information
- Time zone: AST (UTC-4)

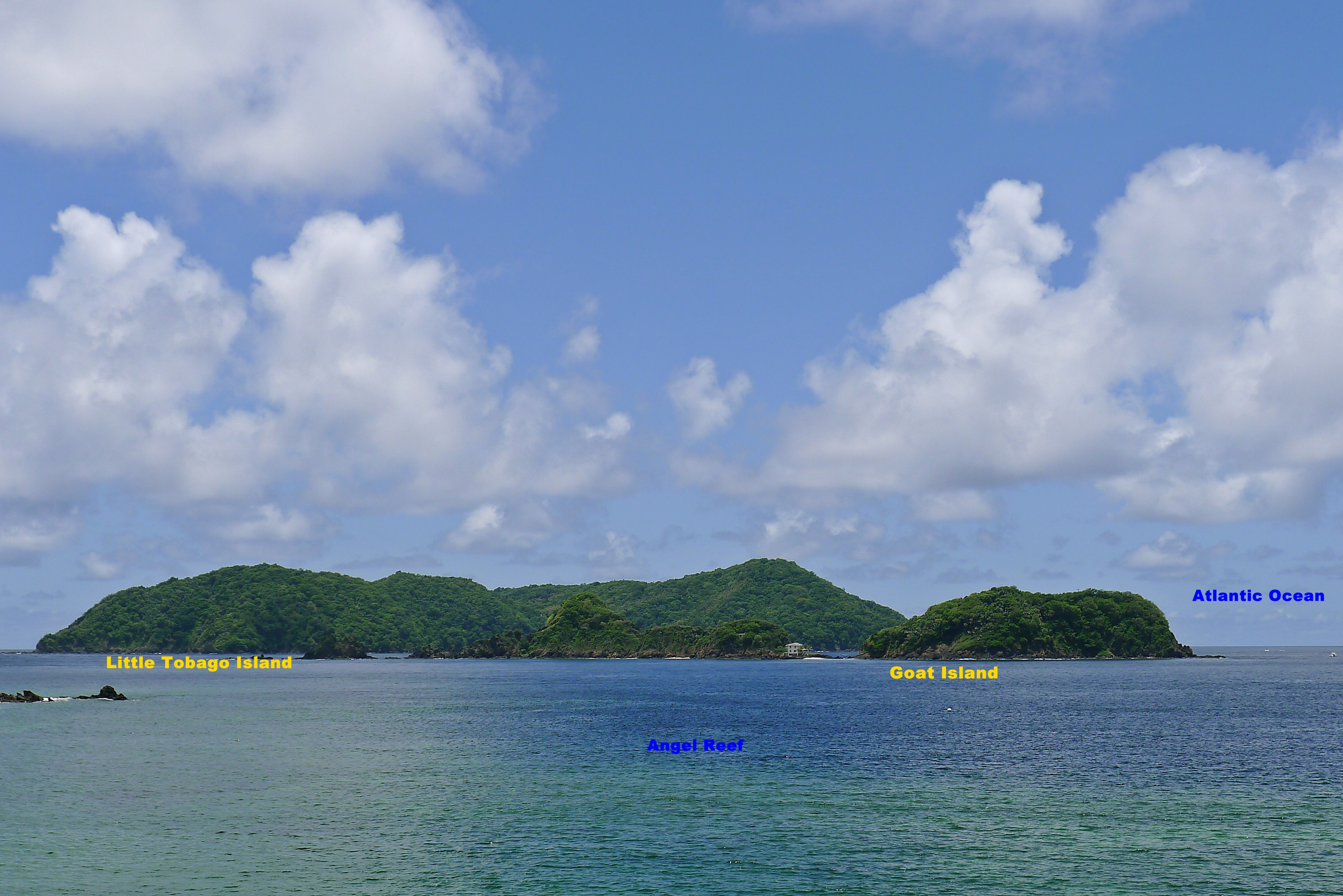
Goat Island (30)

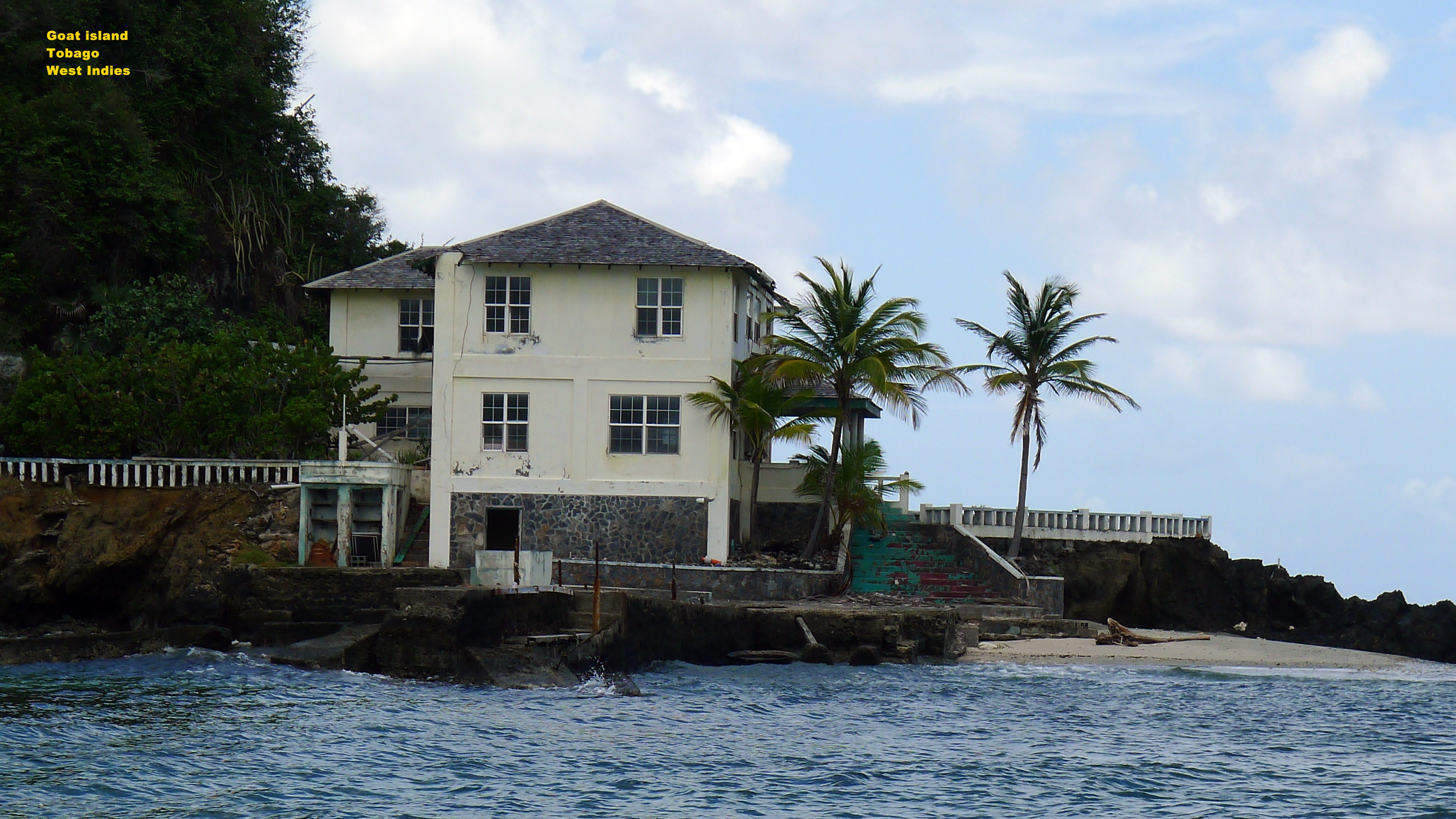
Goat Island (20)

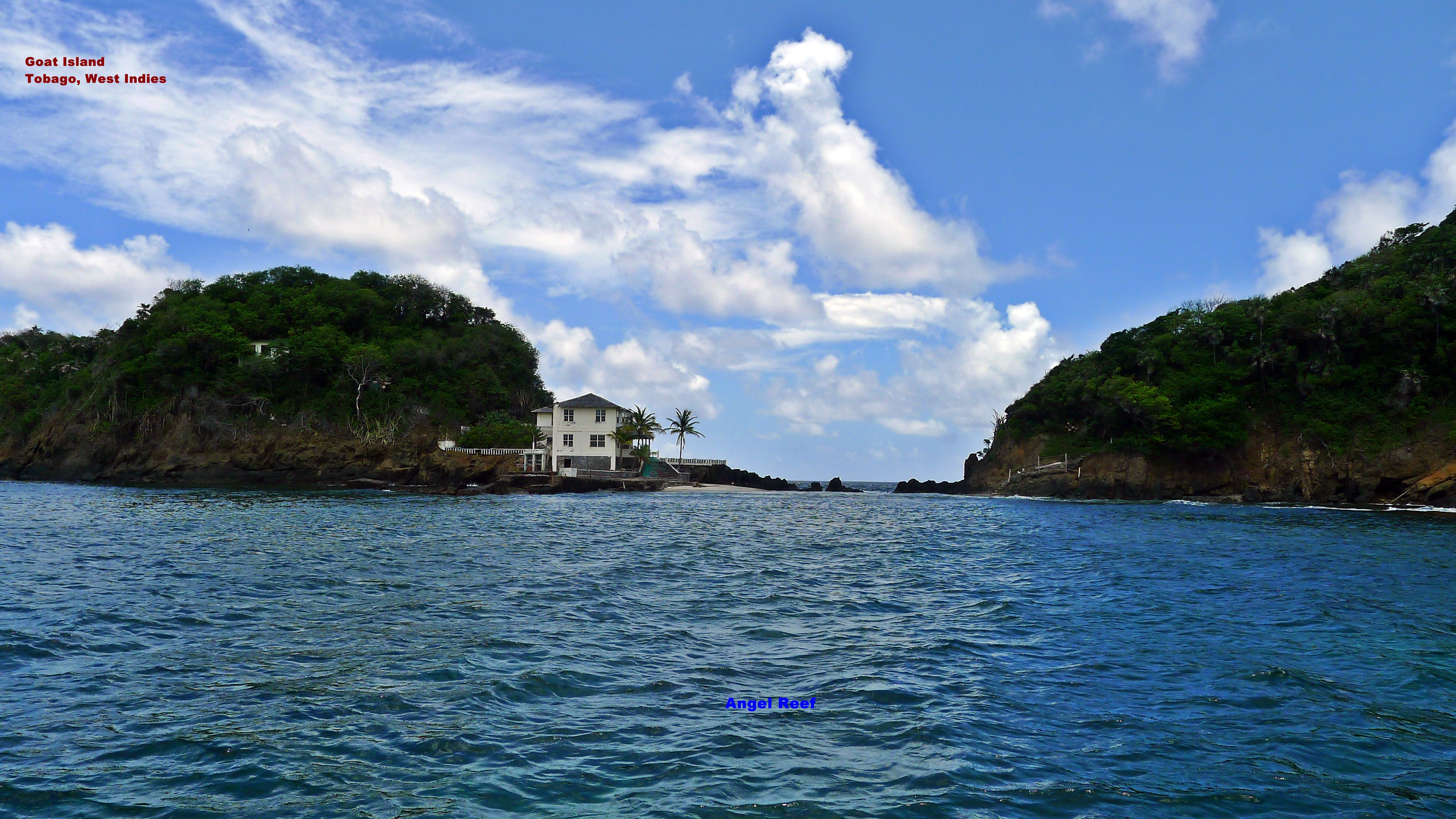
Goat Island (10)

Goat Island is an island in the Republic of Trinidad and Tobago. It is located off the coast of Speyside, between Tobago and Little Tobago.

Some sources say Goat Island is the former home and retreat of Ian Fleming, the author and creator of the James Bond series. An article which appeared in Canada's National Post disputed these claims. Fleming biographer Andrew Lycett stated, "Fleming did not have a house --let alone own an island--in Tobago." Zoe Watkins of Ian Fleming Publications Ltd., which Fleming's nieces run, said, "As far as we are aware, there is no link between Ian Fleming and Goat Island. The James Bond novels were all written at Fleming's house, Goldeneye, in Jamaica." The same article reports that Fleming conceived of Crab Key, the island lair of the mad scientist Dr. Julius No, during a 1956 trip to a flamingo sanctuary in Inagua.

At least four species of lizards have been recorded on the island; namely Green iguanas, Grenada tree anoles, Rainbow whiptails and Turnip-tailed geckos.

== See also ==
- Islands of Trinidad and Tobago
