= Leptodactylus nesiotus =

Conservation status
- Least Concern (IUCN 3.1)

Scientific classification
- Kingdom: Animalia
- Phylum: Chordata
- Class: Amphibia
- Order: Anura
- Family: Leptodactylidae
- Genus: Leptodactylus
- Species: L. nesiotus

Binomial name
- Leptodactylus nesiotus Heyer, 1994

Species of frog

Leptodactylus nesiotus is a species of frog in the family Leptodactylidae. It was originally described from Icacos Swamp on the south-western peninsula of Trinidad Island and was for a long time believed to be endemic to the island. However, in 2018 specimens were also reported from Guyana, Suriname, and French Guiana. It is probably the sister taxon of Leptodactylus validus. Indeed, the French Guianan records were first identified as L. validus, and it is possible that also some other L. validus records refer to Leptodactylus nesiotus. It is likely that this species is also found in Venezuela, perhaps even wider in open areas of northern South America.

== Etymology ==
The specific name nesiotus is derived from Greek nesiotes, meaning "islander", and refers to its only known occurrence (at the time of species description) on the Island of Trinidad.

== Description ==
The type series consists of three adult males that measure 31.7–33.3 mm (1.2–1.3 in) in snout–vent length. The snout is rounded in lateral profile and rounded-ovoid from above. The tympanum is of moderate size and the supratympanic fold is distinct. The fingers have moderate lateral ridges whereas the toes have well-developed lateral fringes. There is a distinct light stripe on the upper lip extending at least to under the eye. Dorsal coloration of preserved specimens is in lighter and darker shades of brown gray. Males have a single internal vocal sac.

== Habitat and conservation ==
The Trinidadian population occurs in a swamp, which is a relatively pristine area and where the species is not facing significant threats. The continental populations occur along the coastal savannas and swamps of northern South America, providing continuous habitat for the species.
