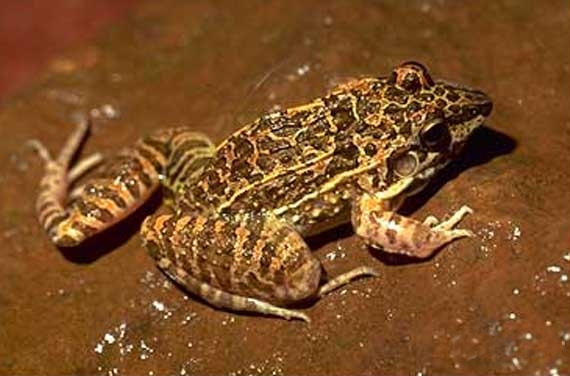

Conservation status
- Least Concern (IUCN 3.1)

Scientific classification
- Kingdom: Animalia
- Phylum: Chordata
- Class: Amphibia
- Order: Anura
- Family: Leptodactylidae
- Genus: Leptodactylus
- Species: L. fuscus

Binomial name
- Leptodactylus fuscus (Schneider, 1799)

= Leptodactylus fuscus =

Species of frog

Leptodactylus fuscus is a species of frog in the family Leptodactylidae. Its local name in Brazil is rã-assobiadora (lit. 'whistling frog'). The English name rufous frog has been proposed by Frank & Ramus and is currently used by the IUCN. It is found in Argentina, Bolivia, Brazil, Colombia, French Guiana, Guyana, Panama, Paraguay, Peru, Suriname, Trinidad and Tobago, and Venezuela.

== Habitat ==
This frog lives in grassy places, marshes, urban areas, and degraded forests. Scientists observed the frog between 0 and 1750 meters above sea level. This frog has shown a strong tolerance to antropogenic disturbance.

Scientists have reported the frog many protected places. In Brazil, about 17 percent of these frogs live in protected parks.

== Reproduction ==
The male frogs call to the female frogs when it rains. The frog deposits eggs in burrows in wet areas and near lagoons. When rainwater floods the burrows, the larvae swim out into nearby bodies of water.

== Threats ==
Scientists from the IUCN say this frog is least concern of extinction.
