= Pristimantis charlottevillensis =

Conservation status
- Vulnerable (IUCN 3.1)

Scientific classification
- Kingdom: Animalia
- Phylum: Chordata
- Class: Amphibia
- Order: Anura
- Clade: Brachycephaloidea
- Family: Craugastoridae
- Genus: Pristimantis
- Species: P. charlottevillensis

Binomial name
- Pristimantis charlottevillensis (Kaiser, Dwyer, Feichtinger & Schmidt, 1995)

Synonyms
- Eleutherodactylus charlottevillensis Kaiser, Dwyer, Feichtinger & Schmidt, 1995

Species of frog

Pristimantis charlottevillensis is a species of frog in the family Strabomantidae. It is endemic to the island of Tobago in the Republic of Trinidad and Tobago. Its natural habitat is tropical moist lowland forests where it often utilizes stream side leaf litter and low (forest floor) vegetation. It is chiefly nocturnal.
