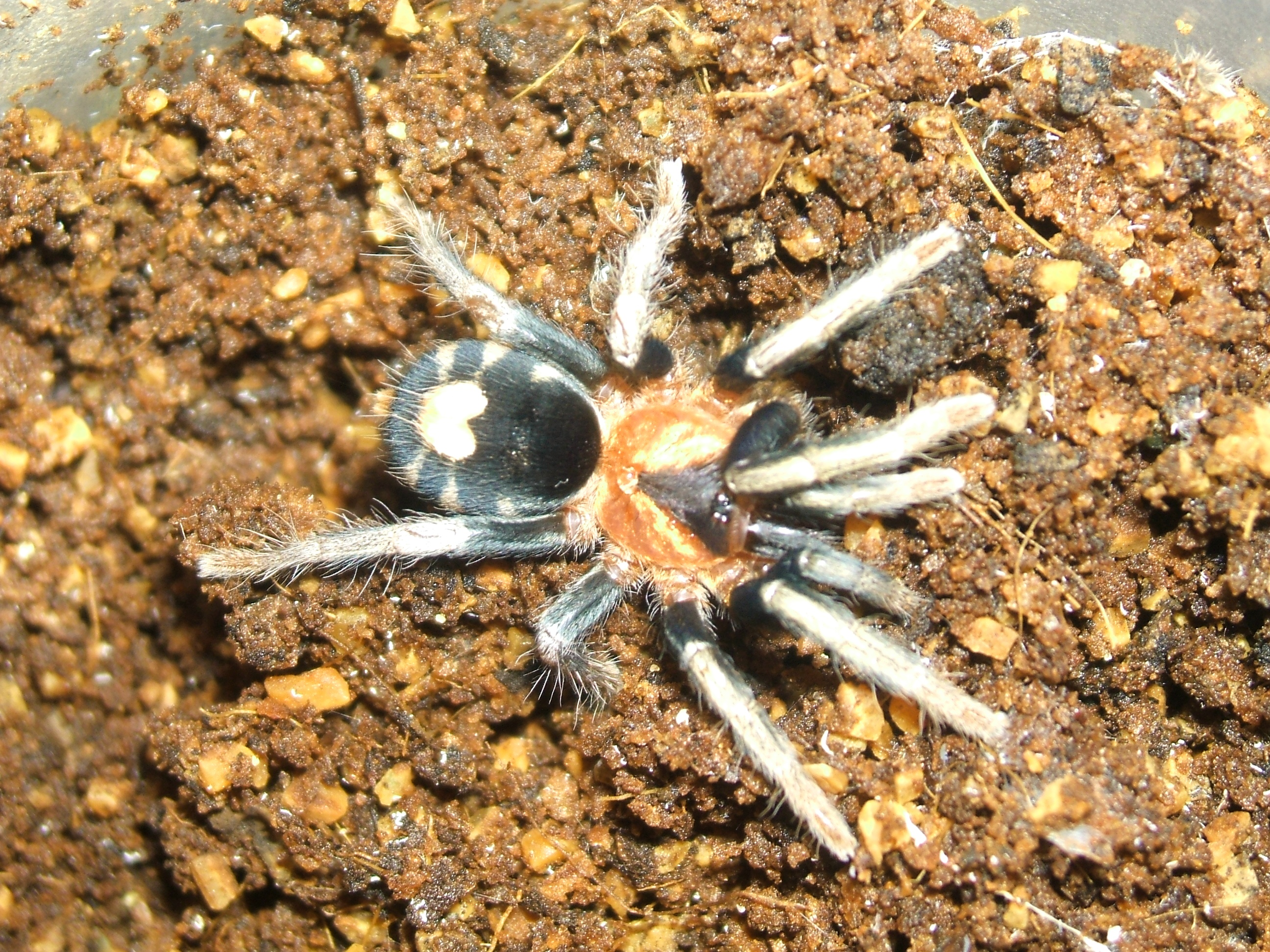
- Juvenile unsexed Cyriocosmus elegans

Scientific classification
- Kingdom: Animalia
- Phylum: Arthropoda
- Subphylum: Chelicerata
- Class: Arachnida
- Order: Araneae
- Infraorder: Mygalomorphae
- Family: Theraphosidae
- Genus: Cyriocosmus
- Species: C. elegans

Binomial name
- Cyriocosmus elegans (Simon, 1889)

= Cyriocosmus elegans =

Species of spider

Cyriocosmus elegans is a spider species in the genus Cyriocosmus and the family Theraphosidae (tarantulas) found in Venezuela, Trinidad and Tobago.

== Basic Information ==
Cyriocosmus elegans is a fossorial species of tarantula that is known to reach maturity quickly, sometimes in a year's time. Adult size is around 1.5" to 2" diagonal leg span (DLS), from leg I on one side to leg IV on the opposite side. Second instar spiderlings are around 1/16" to 1/8" DLS and will readily accept pre-killed feeders, fruit flies, or even a cricket leg.

== Climate of Habitat^{1} ==
Trinidad and Tobago
