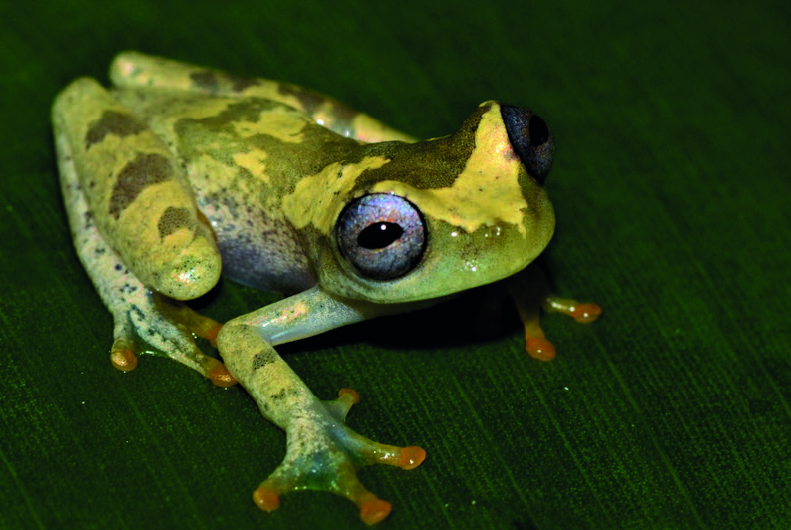
- Amapá, Brazil

Conservation status
- Least Concern (IUCN 3.1)

Scientific classification
- Kingdom: Animalia
- Phylum: Chordata
- Class: Amphibia
- Order: Anura
- Family: Hylidae
- Genus: Dendropsophus
- Species: D. minusculus

Binomial name
- Dendropsophus minusculus (Rivero, 1971)

= Dendropsophus minusculus =

Species of frog

Dendropsophus minusculus is a species of frog in the family Hylidae. It is found in Colombia, French Guiana, Guyana, Suriname, Trinidad and Tobago, and Venezuela. Its natural habitats are subtropical or tropical moist lowland forests, dry savanna, moist savanna, subtropical or tropical seasonally wet or flooded lowland grassland, freshwater marshes, intermittent freshwater marshes, arable land, rural gardens, heavily degraded former forest, and ponds.

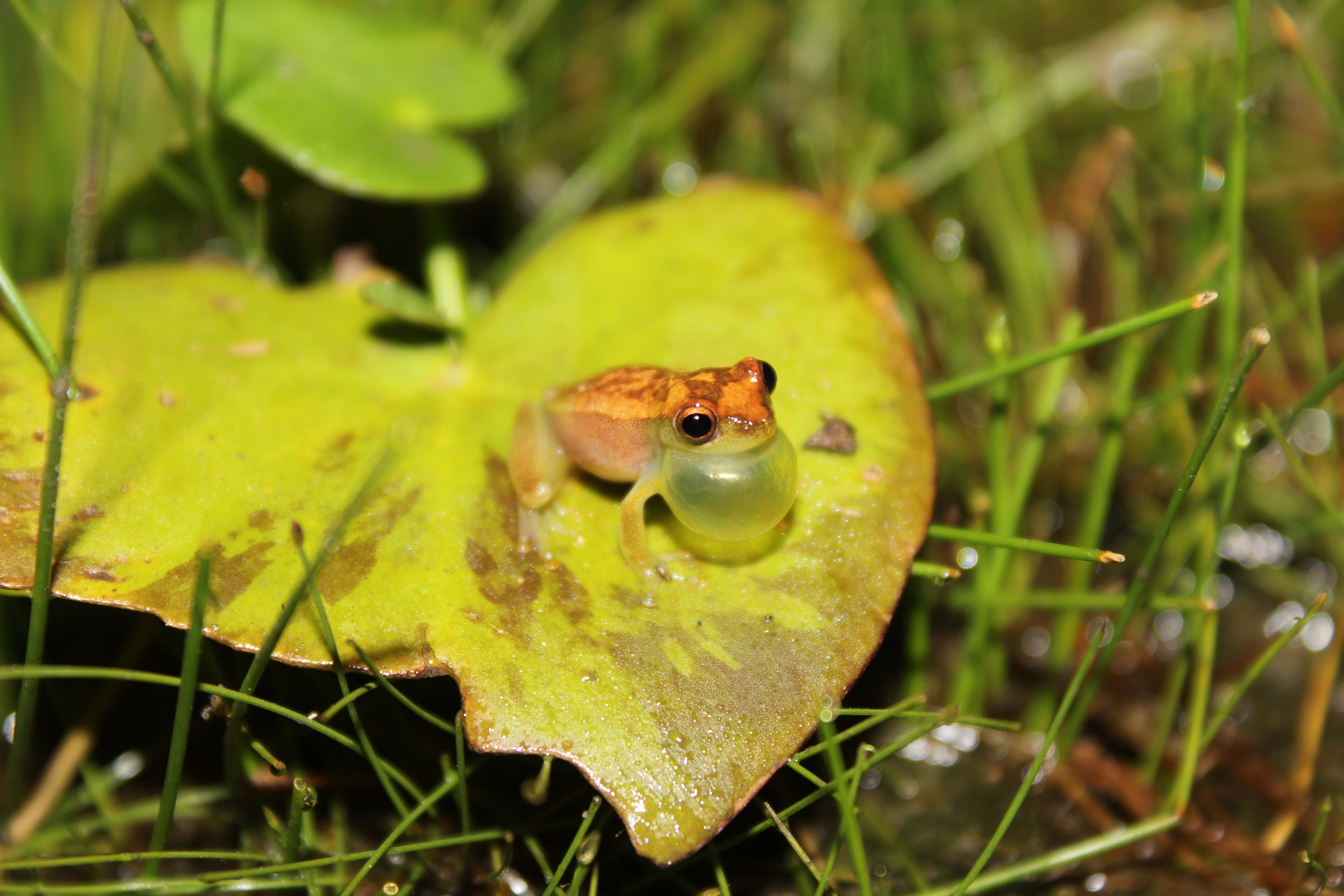
São Bernardo, Brazil
