= Pristimantis turpinorum =

Conservation status
- Data Deficient (IUCN 3.1)

Scientific classification
- Kingdom: Animalia
- Phylum: Chordata
- Class: Amphibia
- Order: Anura
- Family: Strabomantidae
- Genus: Pristimantis
- Species: P. turpinorum

Binomial name
- Pristimantis turpinorum (Hardy, 2001)

Synonyms
- Eleutherodactylus turpinorum Hardy, 2001

Species of amphibian

Pristimantis turpinorum is a species of frog in the family Strabomantidae.

It is endemic to the north-eastern part of the island of Tobago in The Republic of Trinidad and Tobago. Its natural habitat is tropical moist lowland forests.
