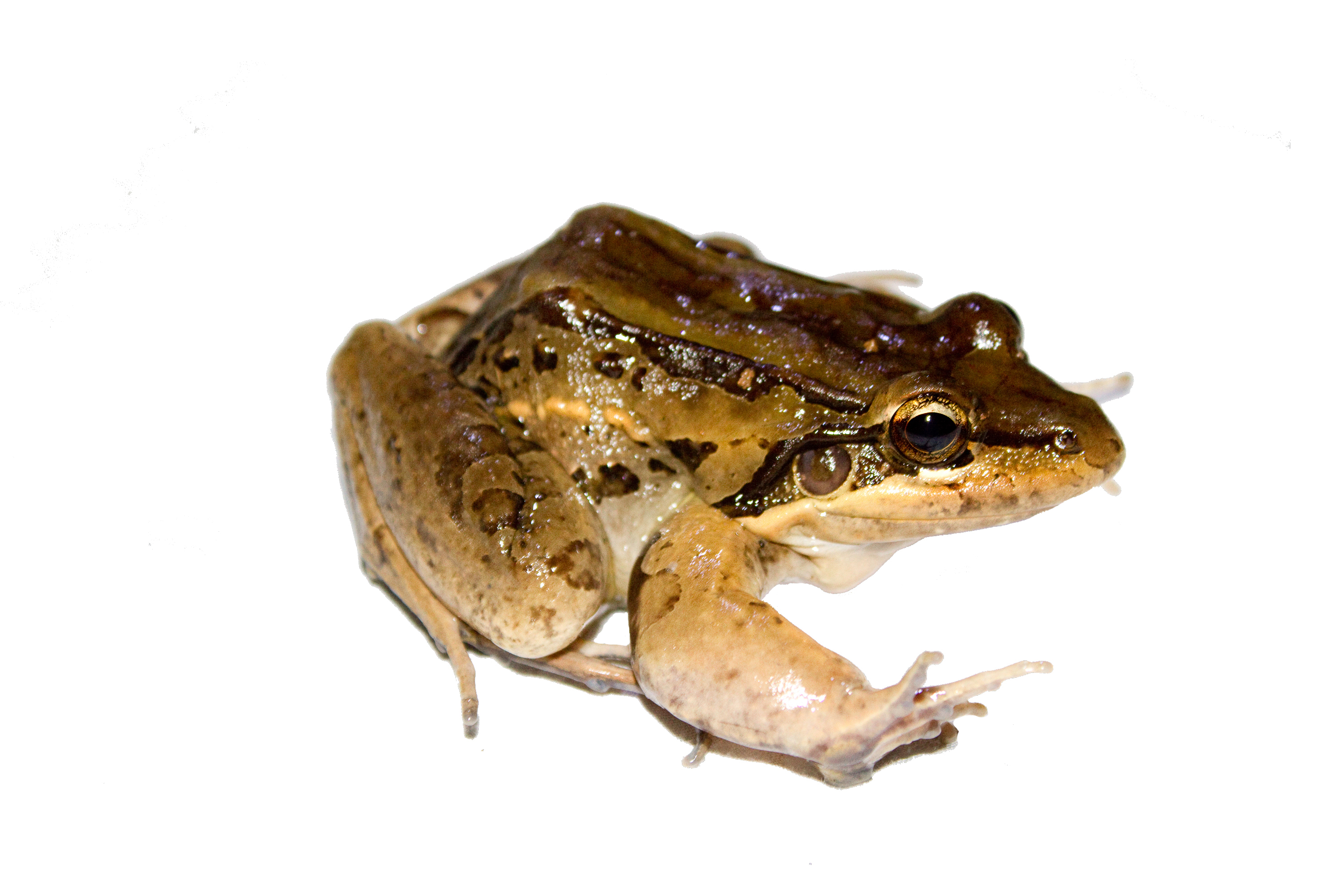

Conservation status
- Least Concern (IUCN 3.1)

Scientific classification
- Kingdom: Animalia
- Phylum: Chordata
- Class: Amphibia
- Order: Anura
- Family: Leptodactylidae
- Genus: Leptodactylus
- Species: L. insularum

Binomial name
- Leptodactylus insularum Barbour, 1906

Synonyms
- Leptodactylus insularum Barbour, 1906; Leptodactylus bolivianaus insularum Gallardo, 1964

= Leptodactylus insularum =

Species of frog

Leptodactylus insularum (San Miguel Island frog or Caribbean ditch frog) is a species of frog in the family Leptodactylidae. The species is found in Costa Rica, Panama, Colombia, Venezuela, and Trinidad and Tobago. Scientists suspect it might also live in Bolivia.

== Description ==
The adult male frog measures 66–104.6 mm in snout-vent length and the adult female frog 60.4–99.1 mm. The skin of the dorusm has several folds and dark marks on it. There is a dark line from the nose to each eye. The backs of the legs have a dark pattern on them with light spots in irregular shapes. The flanks are light brown with dark brown spots. The belly is very light brown in color. The adult frogs use the aposematic coloration on their legs to confuse predators.

== Habitat ==
These frogs live in forests near streams. Scientists saw the frog in many protected places.

== Diet ==
The adult frogs eat water insects, such as those of the families Elateridae, Formicidae, Belastomatidae, and Lycosidae. The tadpoles feed on decaying matter, often things that have fallen into the water.

== Reproduction ==
The male frog makes a foam nest for the eggs. The female frog can lay 2000 eggs per clutch. The female frog protects the eggs and tadpoles. After the eggs hatch, the female leads them to deep water. If the body of water is about to dry up, the female frog will dig a small channel so the tadpoles can escape.

== Relationship to humans ==
Sometimes people use this frog as fish bait. Scientists found that this frog produces peptides in its skin, for example the peptide Ocellatin-3N, which has shown antimicrobial effects. These scientists note that this could have significant implications for the treatment of disease in humans.

== Threats ==
The IUCN classifies this species as least concern of extinctino. It has shown tolerance to anthropogenic disturbance and has even been found in the same areas as chytrid fungus. B. dendrobatidis causes the disease chytridiomycosis, which is associated with pronounced declines in amphibian populations in South America.

== Original publication ==
- Barbour, T. (1906). "Vertebrata from the savanna of Panama—Reptilia; Amphibia". Bulletin of the Museum of Comparative Zoology. 46. Cambridge, Massachusetts: 224–230.
