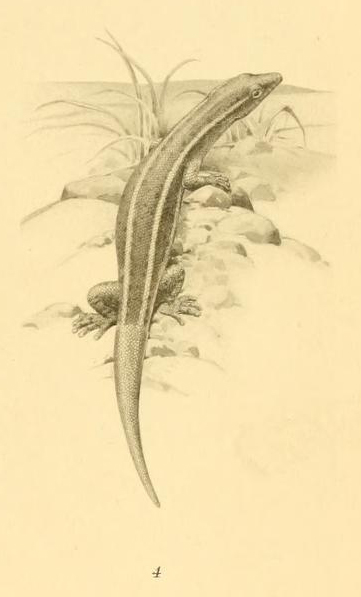
- Sphaerodactylus molei, drawing by E.N. Fischer from Barbour, 1921

Conservation status
- Least Concern (IUCN 3.1)

Scientific classification
- Kingdom: Animalia
- Phylum: Chordata
- Class: Reptilia
- Order: Squamata
- Suborder: Gekkota
- Family: Sphaerodactylidae
- Genus: Sphaerodactylus
- Species: S. molei

Binomial name
- Sphaerodactylus molei Boettger, 1894

Synonyms
- Sphaerodactylus molei Boettger, 1894; Sphaerodactylus buergeri F. Werner, 1900; Sphaerodactylus venezuelanus Roux, 1927; Sphaerodactylus molei — King, 1962

= Tobago least gecko =

Species of lizard

The Tobago least gecko (Sphaerodactylus molei), also known commonly as Mole's gecko, is a species of lizard in the family Sphaerodactylidae. The species is native to the Caribbean and northern South America.

== Etymology ==
The specific name, molei is in honor of British naturalist Richard Richardson Mole (1860–1926) of Port of Spain, Trinidad.

== Geographic distribution ==
Sphaerodactylus molei is found in the Antilles, Guyana, Trinidad and Tobago, and Venezuela including Margarita Island.

== Habitat ==
The preferred habitat of Sphaerodactylus molei is forest at altitudes of 0–500 m (0–1,640 ft).

== Description ==
Adults of Sphaerodacrtlus molei have a snout-to-vent length (SVL) of about 25 mm (0.98 in).

== Reproduction ==
Sphaerodactylus molei is oviparous. The adult female usually lays one egg, rarely two, in a rotten stump. Average egg size is 7 mm (0.28 in) by 5.0–5.5 mm (0.20–0.22 in).
