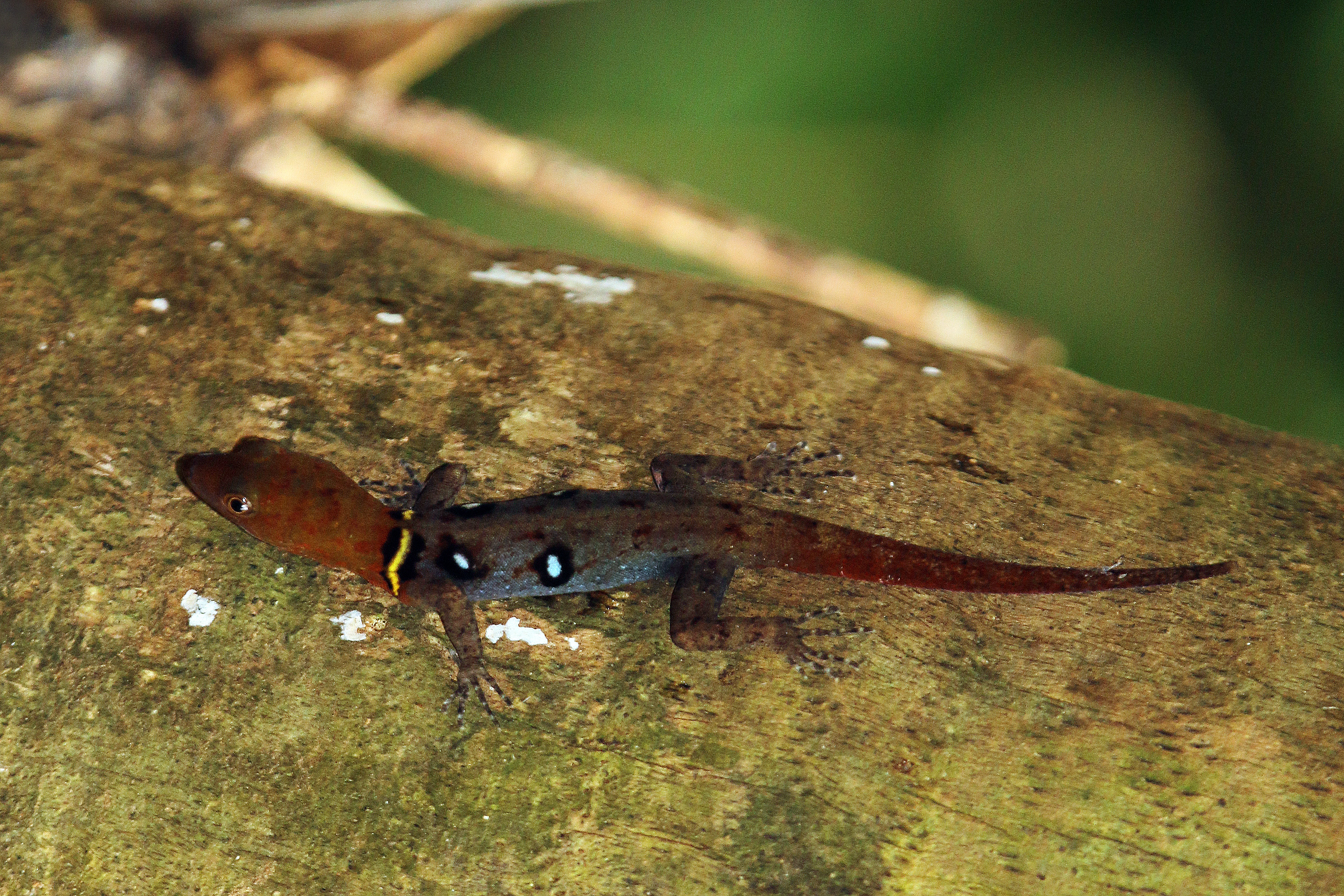

Conservation status
- Least Concern (IUCN 3.1)

Scientific classification
- Domain: Eukaryota
- Kingdom: Animalia
- Phylum: Chordata
- Class: Reptilia
- Order: Squamata
- Infraorder: Gekkota
- Family: Sphaerodactylidae
- Genus: Gonatodes
- Species: G. ocellatus

Binomial name
- Gonatodes ocellatus (Gray, 1831)

= Eyespot gecko =

Species of lizard

The eyespot gecko (Gonatodes ocellatus) is a species of lizard in the Sphaerodactylidae family native to Tobago.
