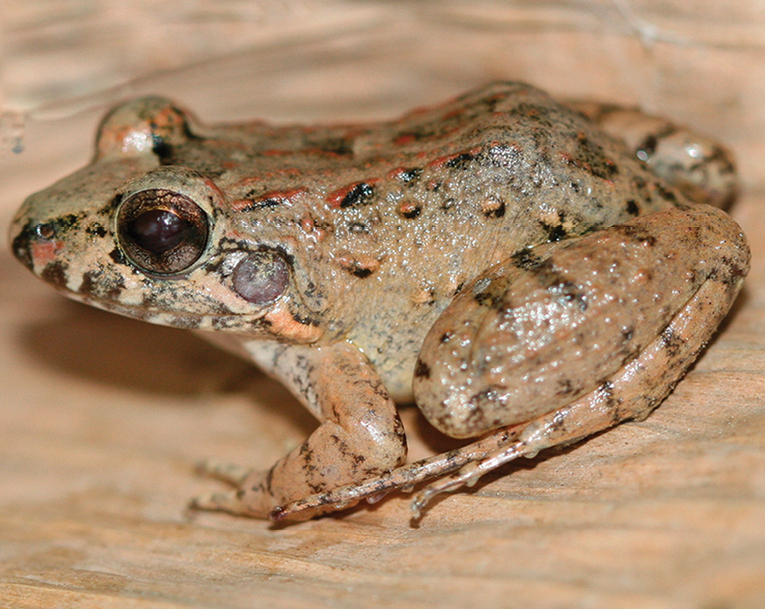

Conservation status
- Least Concern (IUCN 3.1)

Scientific classification
- Kingdom: Animalia
- Phylum: Chordata
- Class: Amphibia
- Order: Anura
- Family: Leptodactylidae
- Genus: Leptodactylus
- Species: L. validus

Binomial name
- Leptodactylus validus Garman, 1888

Synonyms
- Leptodactylus pallidirostris Lutz, 1930

= Windward ditch frog =

Species of amphibian

The Windward ditch frog or smooth-skinned ditch frog (Leptodactylus validus) is a species of frog in the family Leptodactylidae. It is found in the Lesser Antilles (Grenada, Saint Vincent and the Grenadines, and Trinidad and Tobago), the Guianas (French Guiana, Guyana, Suriname), and in the northernmost Brazil (Roraima) and in Venezuela. The Lesser Antillean part of the range might be due to human introduction. In 2018, the species was recorded from Colombia for the first time.

The continental Leptodactylus pallidirostris was found to be the same species as Leptodactylus validus in 2006. The former Leptodactylus pallidirostris is described as a dweller of gallery forests and forest edges. The Lesser Antillean populations are found in forests and forest edges often found close to forest stream banks, shaded gullies, and caves. They may also be found in meadows, at roadsides in parks and rural yards. The species lays its eggs in streams and ditches, where the tadpoles later develop. This frog has been observed as high as 1,700 metres (5,600 ft) above sea level.

Male Leptodactylus validus grow to a snout–vent length of 28–43 mm (1.1–1.7 in) and females to 30–52 mm (1.2–2.0 in).
