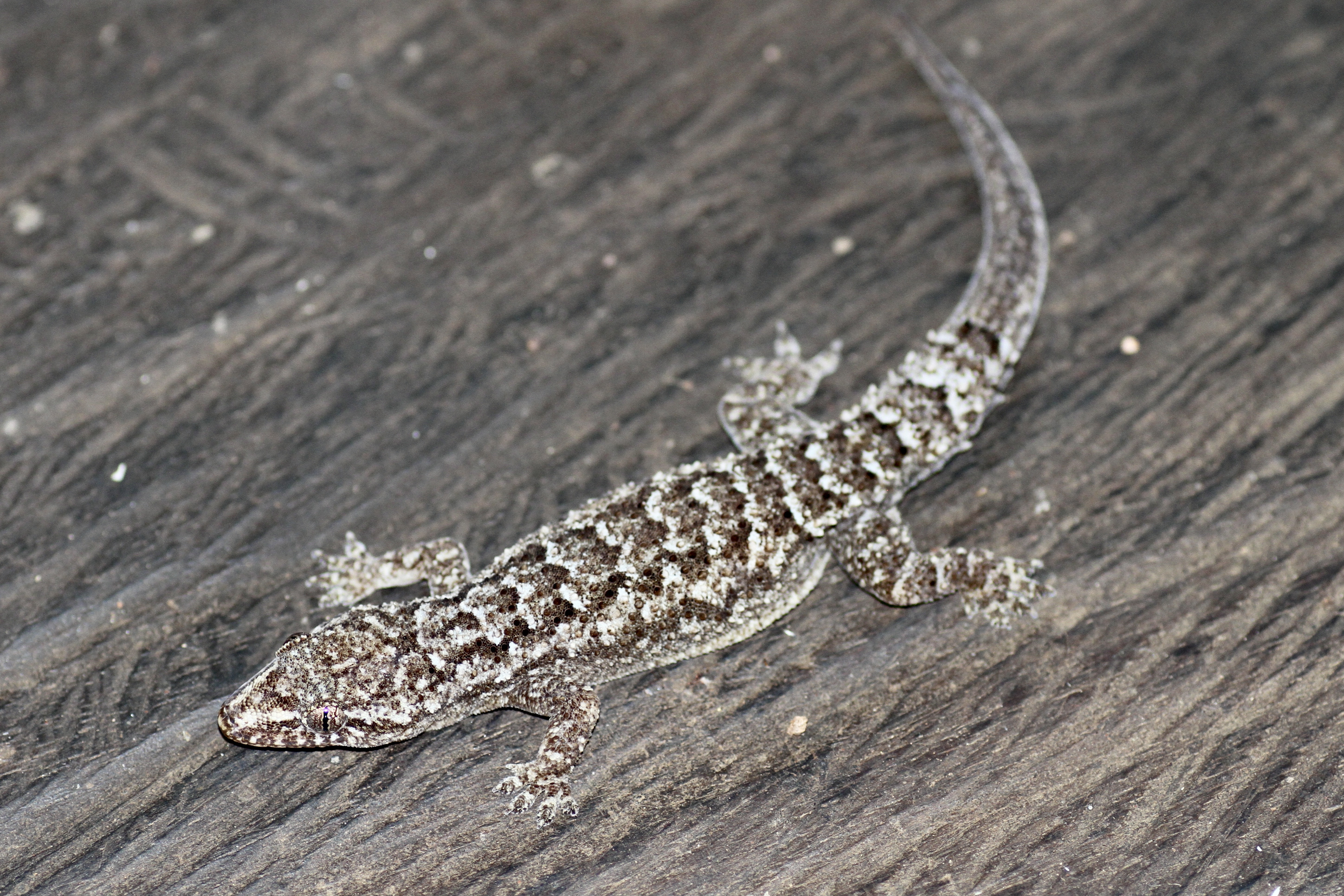
- Hemidactylus palaichthus from Bolivar, Venezuela.

Conservation status
- Least Concern (IUCN 3.1)

Scientific classification
- Kingdom: Animalia
- Phylum: Chordata
- Class: Reptilia
- Order: Squamata
- Suborder: Gekkota
- Family: Gekkonidae
- Genus: Hemidactylus
- Species: H. palaichthus

Binomial name
- Hemidactylus palaichthus Kluge, 1969
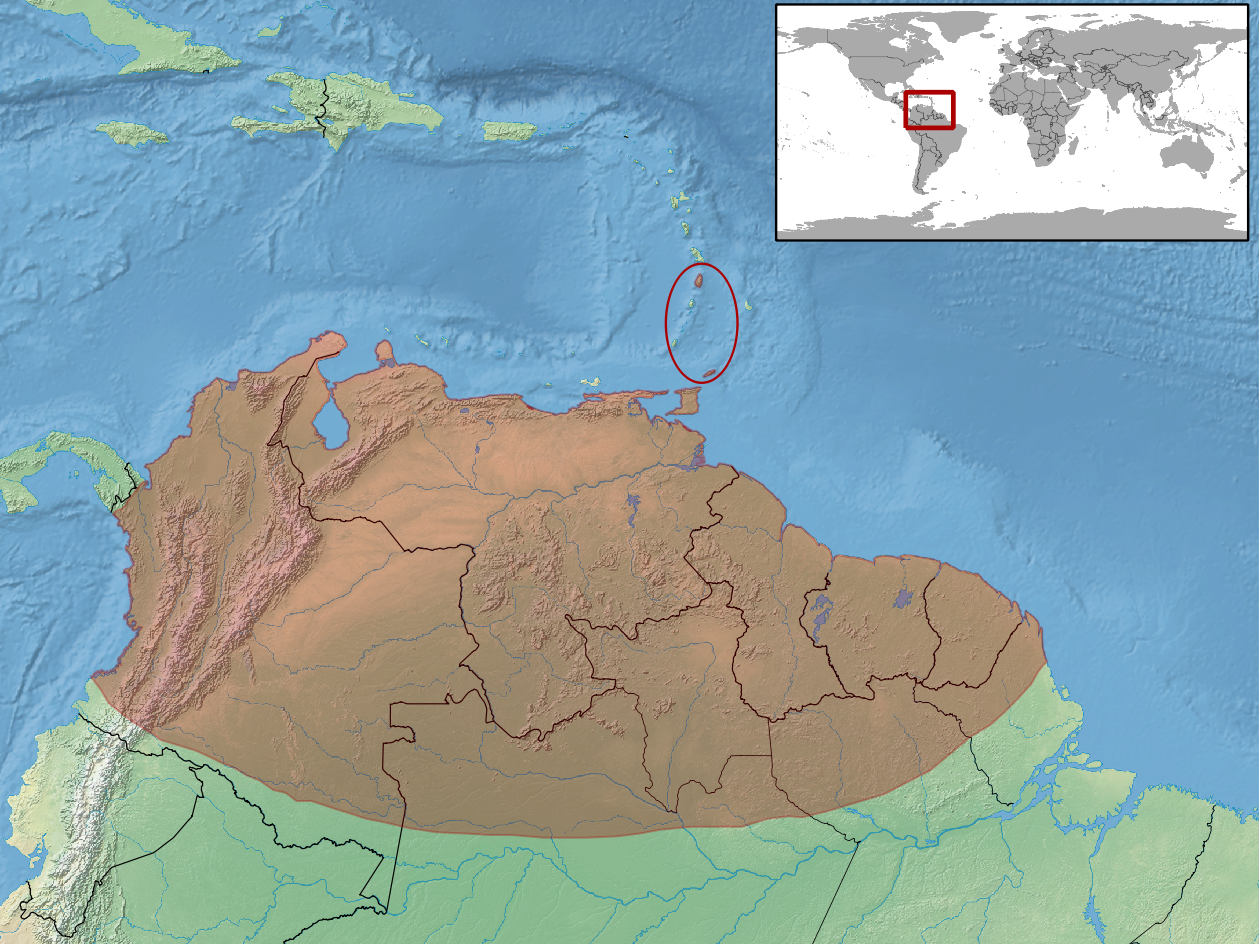

Synonyms
- Hemidactylus brooki palaichthus — Mertens, 1972

= Antilles leaf-toed gecko =

Species of lizard

The Antilles leaf-toed gecko (Hemidactylus palaichthus), also known as the Maria Islands leaf-toed gecko or spiny gecko, is a gecko species found in northern South America and the Lesser Antilles. It can be found on small rocks and islets offshore of Saint Lucia, Trinidad, and Tobago, though it is absent from the main islands.

== Habitat and conservation ==
Hemidactylus palaichthus occurs in tropical savannas, dry forests, and rainforests. It can occur in disturbed habitats (scrubby second growth, or on isolated vegetation (palms, logs) in pastures) and villages (on walls and posts). It is common in parts of its range is not facing any major threat.
