= List of islands of Trinidad and Tobago =

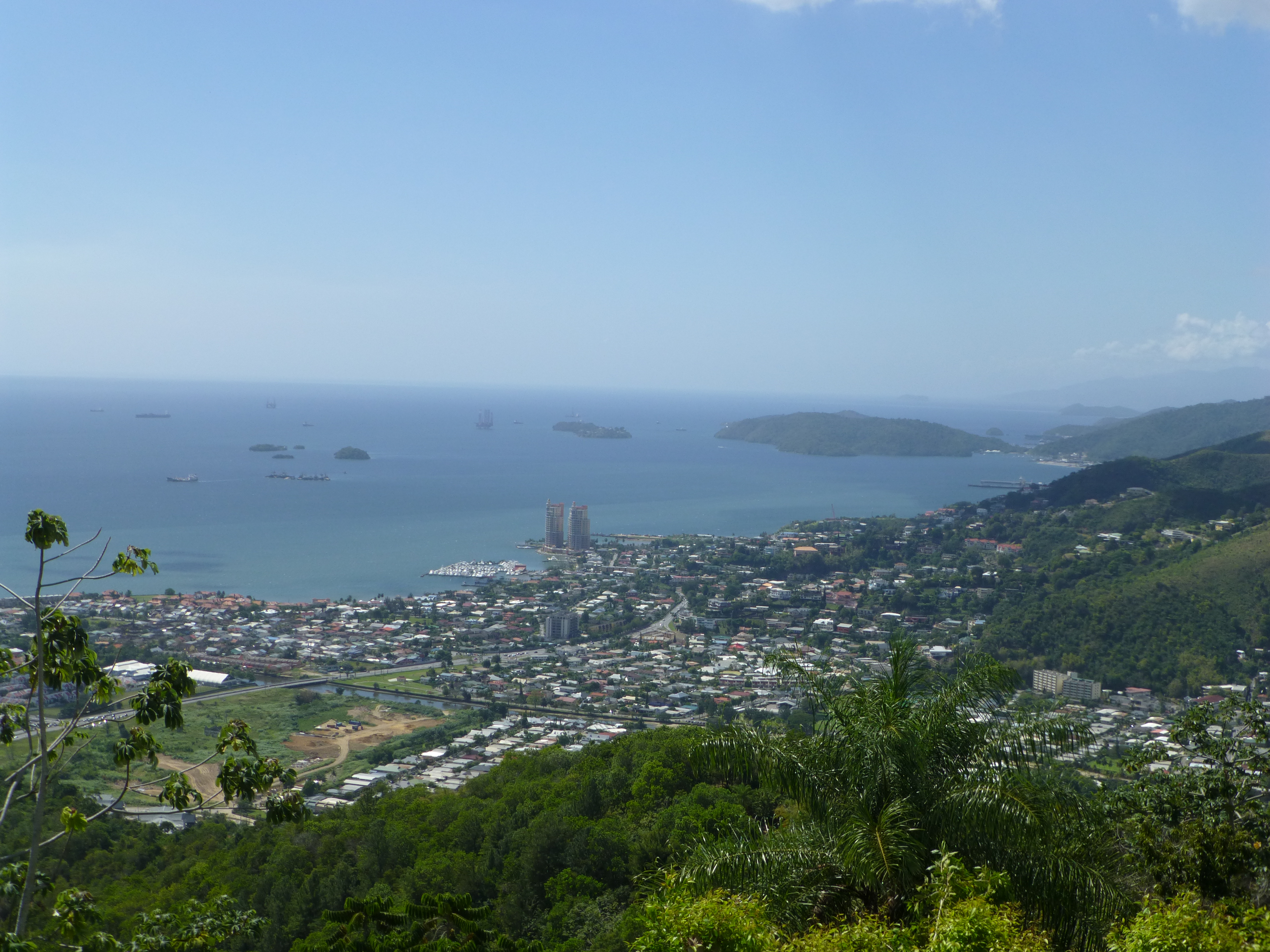
Looking out at Five Islands, Point Gourde, Trinidad

This is a list of islands of Trinidad and Tobago. Trinidad and Tobago is an archipelagic republic in the southern Caribbean.

== Major islands ==
- Trinidad
- Tobago

== Bocas Islands ==
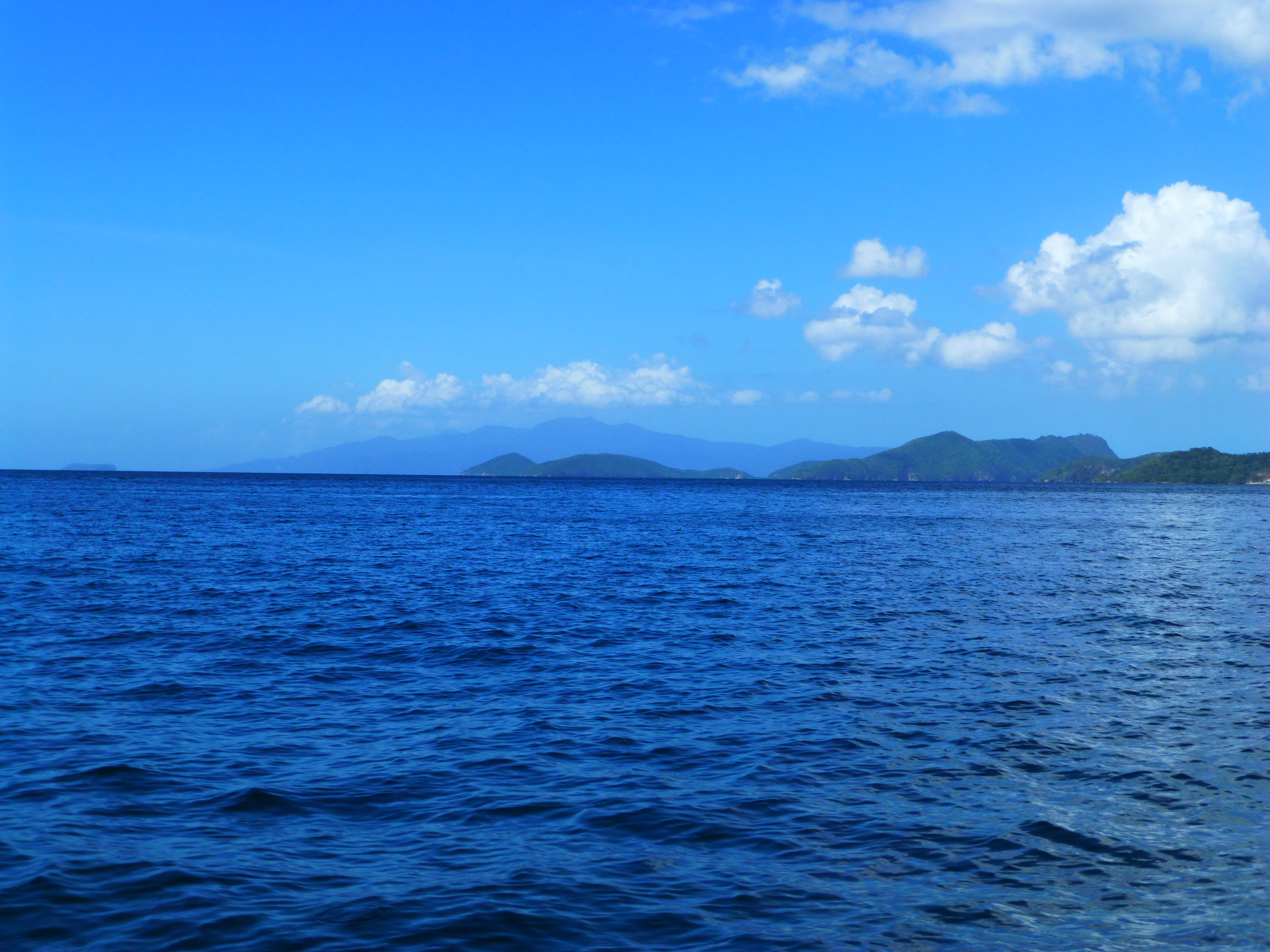
Monos (front) and Chacachacare (back). Venezuelan mainland (Paria Peninsula) seen in the horizon and Patos Island seen to the left.

The Bocas Islands lie between Trinidad and Venezuela, in the Bocas del Dragón (Dragons' Mouth). Locally they are referred to as "Down de Islands" or "DDI".

- Chacachacare
- Monos
- Huevos
- Gaspar Grande (Gasparee)
- Gasparillo Island (Little Gasparee or Centipede Island)

== Five Islands ==
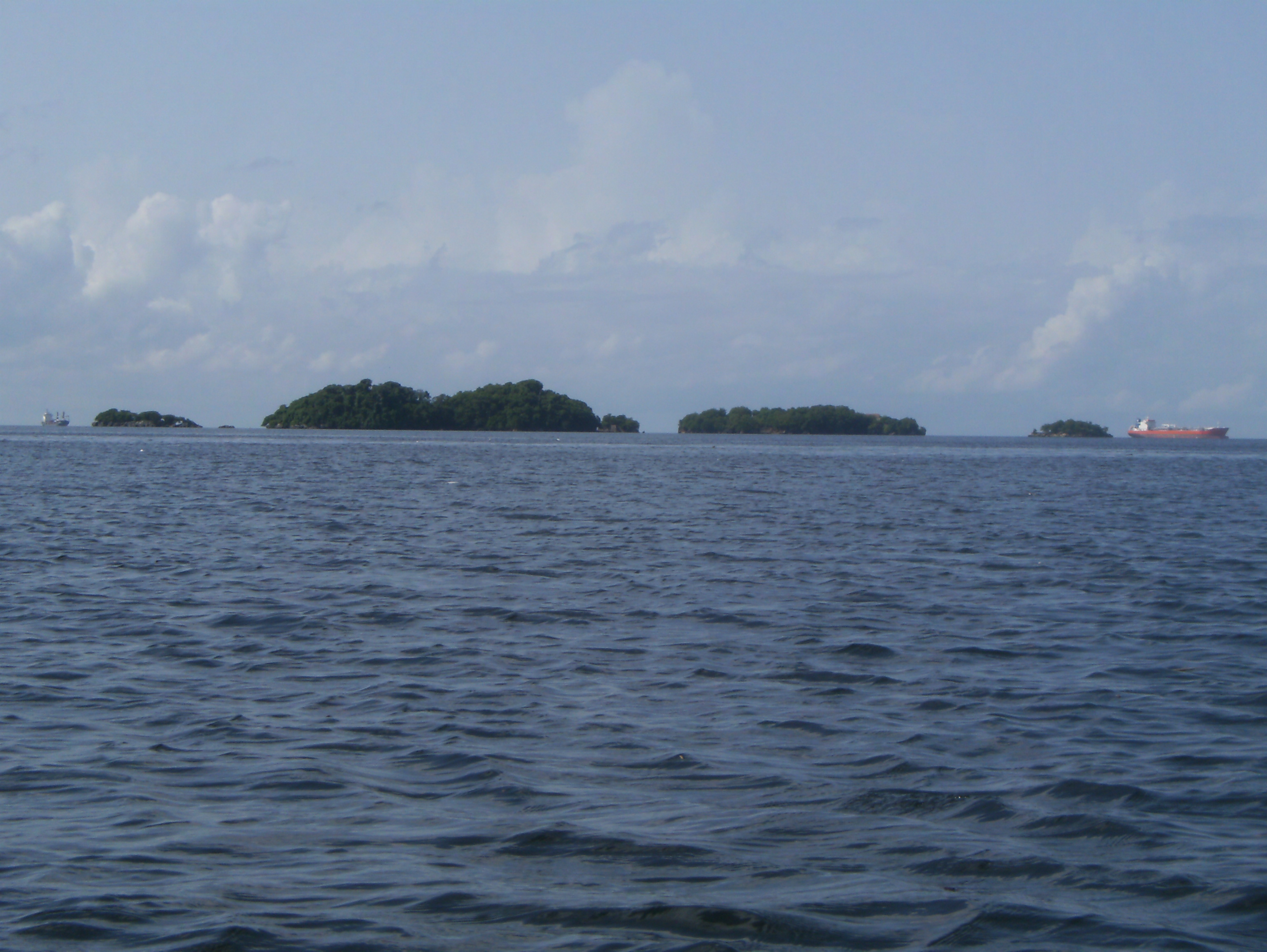
The Five Islands in Trinidad and Tobago as seen approaching from the North

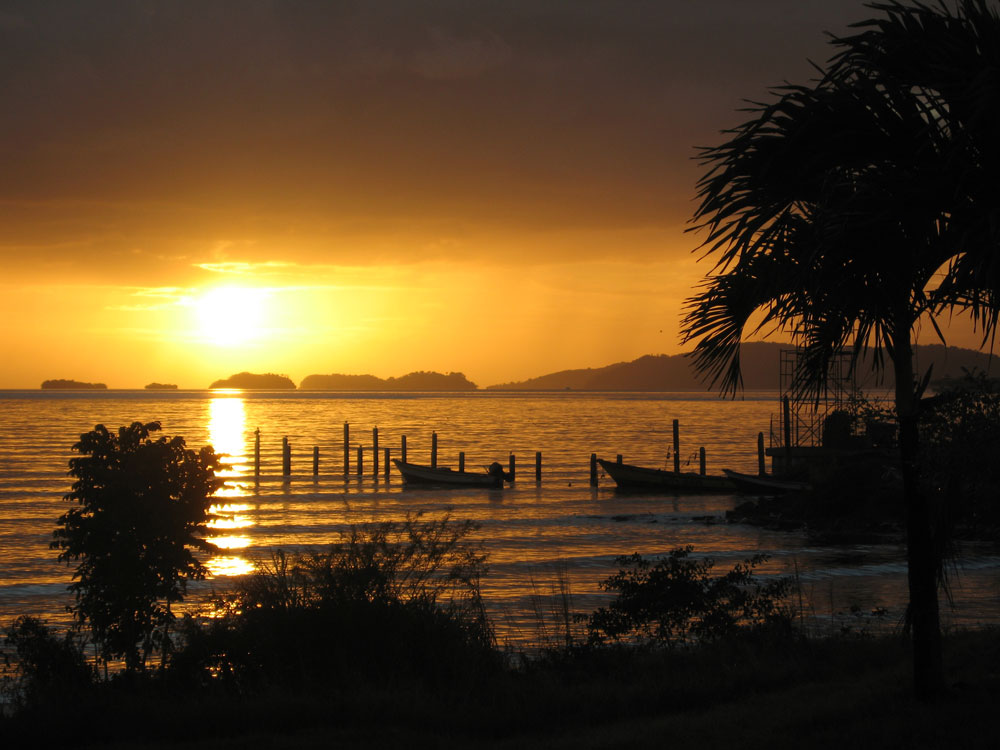
The Five Islands (left), Carrera Island (middle), and the Point Gourde Peninsula at sunset. The view is looking southwest from Trinidad.

The Five Islands are actually a group of six small islands lying west of Port of Spain in the Gulf of Paria. Also known as Las Cotorras.

- Caledonia Island
- Craig Island (Craig and Caledonia are joined by a man-made causeway)
- Lenagan Island
- Nelson Island
- Pelican Island
- Rock Island

== San Diego Islands ==
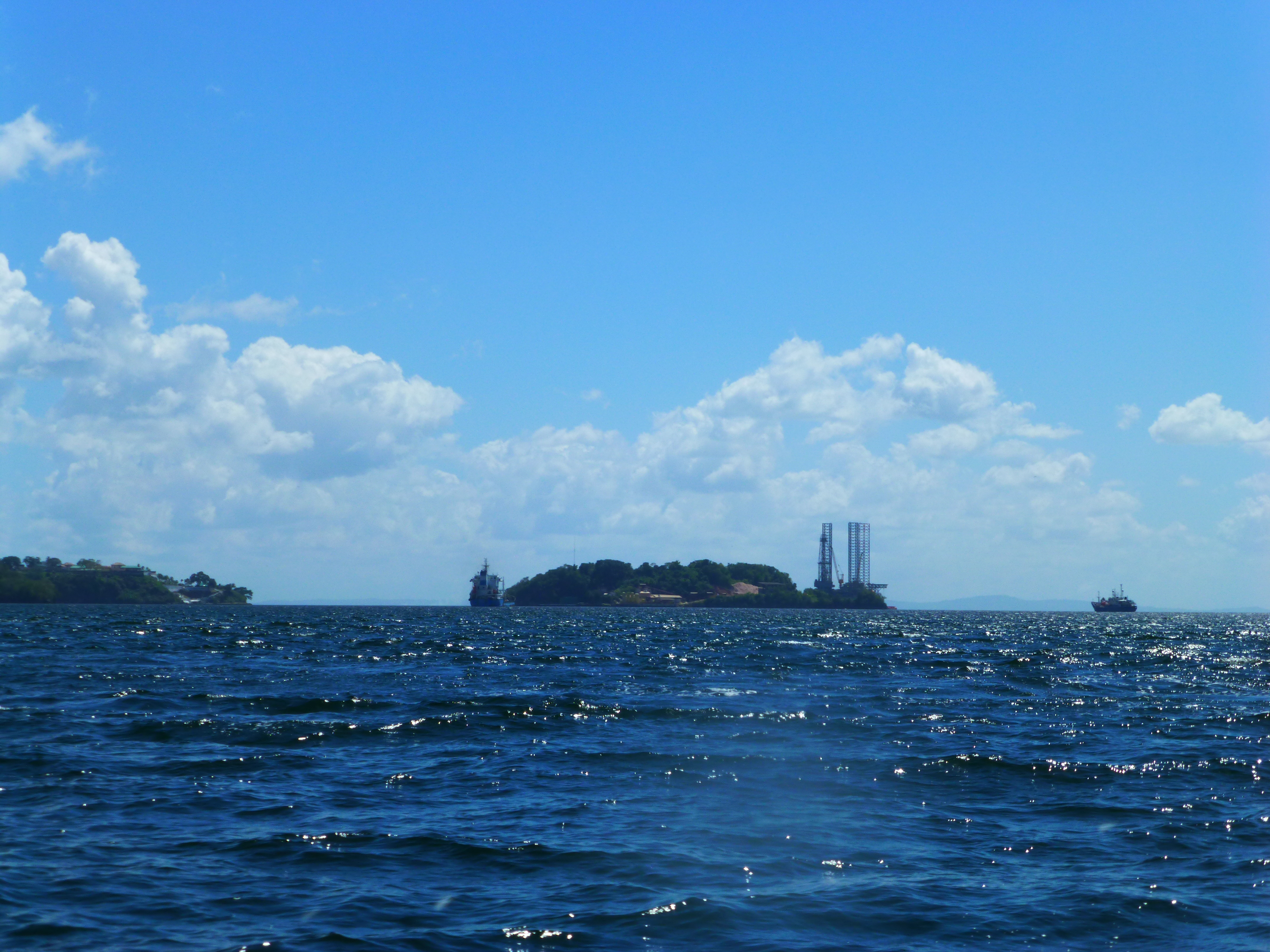
Carrera (left), Cronstadt Island (right)

Sometimes referred to simply as the Diego Islands, these two islets lie between the Bocas Islands and the Five Islands.

- Cronstadt (Kronstadt)
- Carrera (a prison island)

== Others in the Gulf of Paria ==
- Faralon Rock, off San Fernando
- Soldado Rock

== North Coast of Trinidad ==
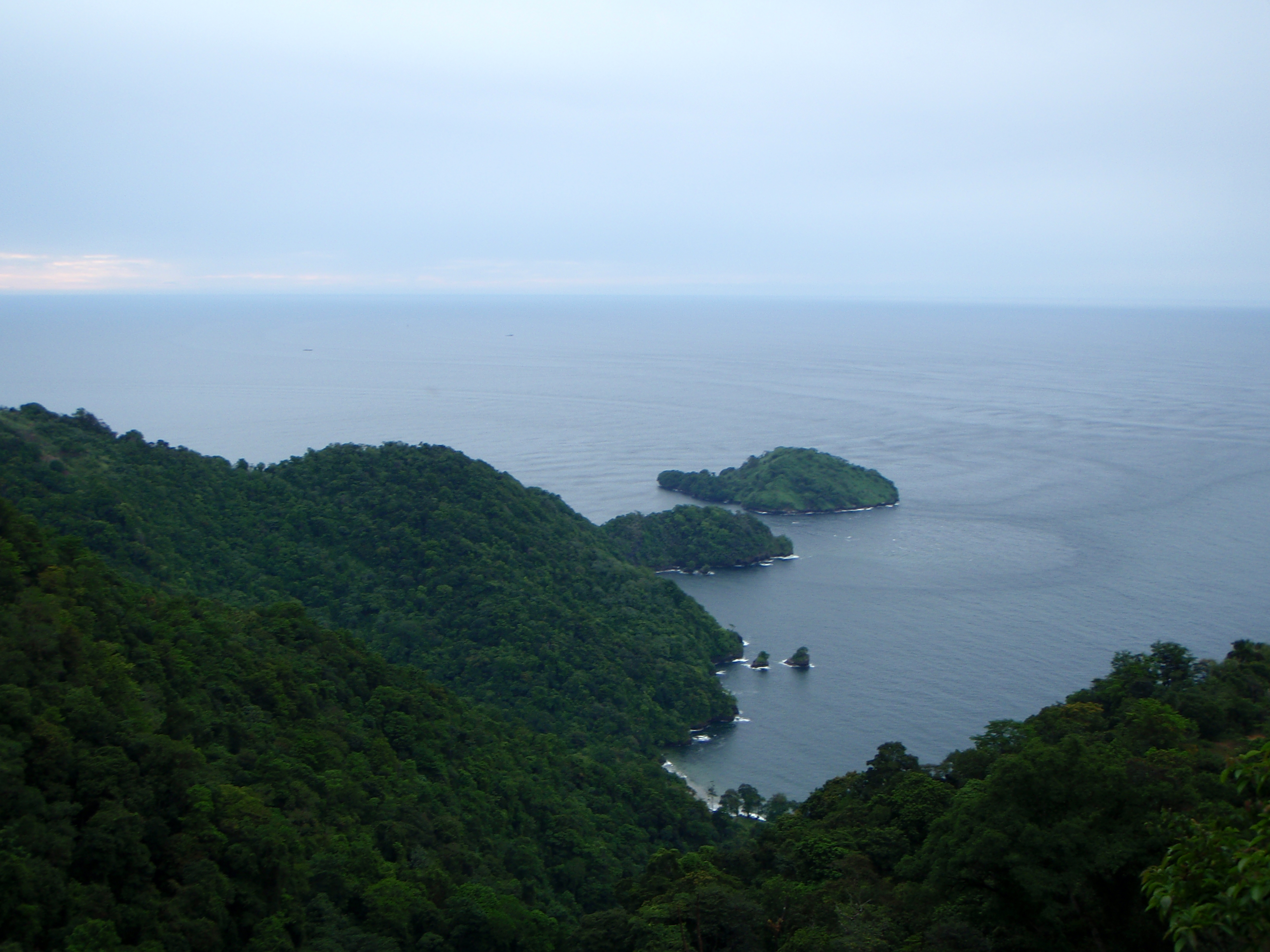
Picture of Saut d'Eau off the north coast of Trinidad.

- Saut d'Eau

== Off Tobago ==
- Little Tobago (Bird of Paradise Island)
- St. Giles Island
- Goat Island
- Sisters' Rock

== List of minor islands with co-ordinates ==
Taken from the Archipelagic Baselines of Trinidad and Tobago Order, Notice No. 206 of 31 October 1988, as corrected by Legal Notice No. 77 on 5 April 1989.

1. East Rock 10°08′12″N 60°59′02″W
2. Casa Cruz Rock 10°04′22″N 61°09′45″W
3. Alcatras Rock 10°04′19″N 61°13′28″W
4. Icacos Point 10°02′28″N 61°54′30″W
5. Black Rock 10°03′27″N 62°01′33″W
6. Cabresse Point 10°41′47″N 61°45′36″W
7. Cabresse Island 10°41′58″N 61°45′25″W
8. Sisters Island 11°19′57″N 60°38′42″W
9. Marble Island 11°21′39″N 60°31′37″W
10. St. Giles Island 11°21′28″N 60°30′52″W
11. Little Tobago 11°17′39″N 60°29′40″W

== See also ==
- List of islands in the Caribbean
- Geography of Trinidad and Tobago
