= Geography of Trinidad and Tobago =

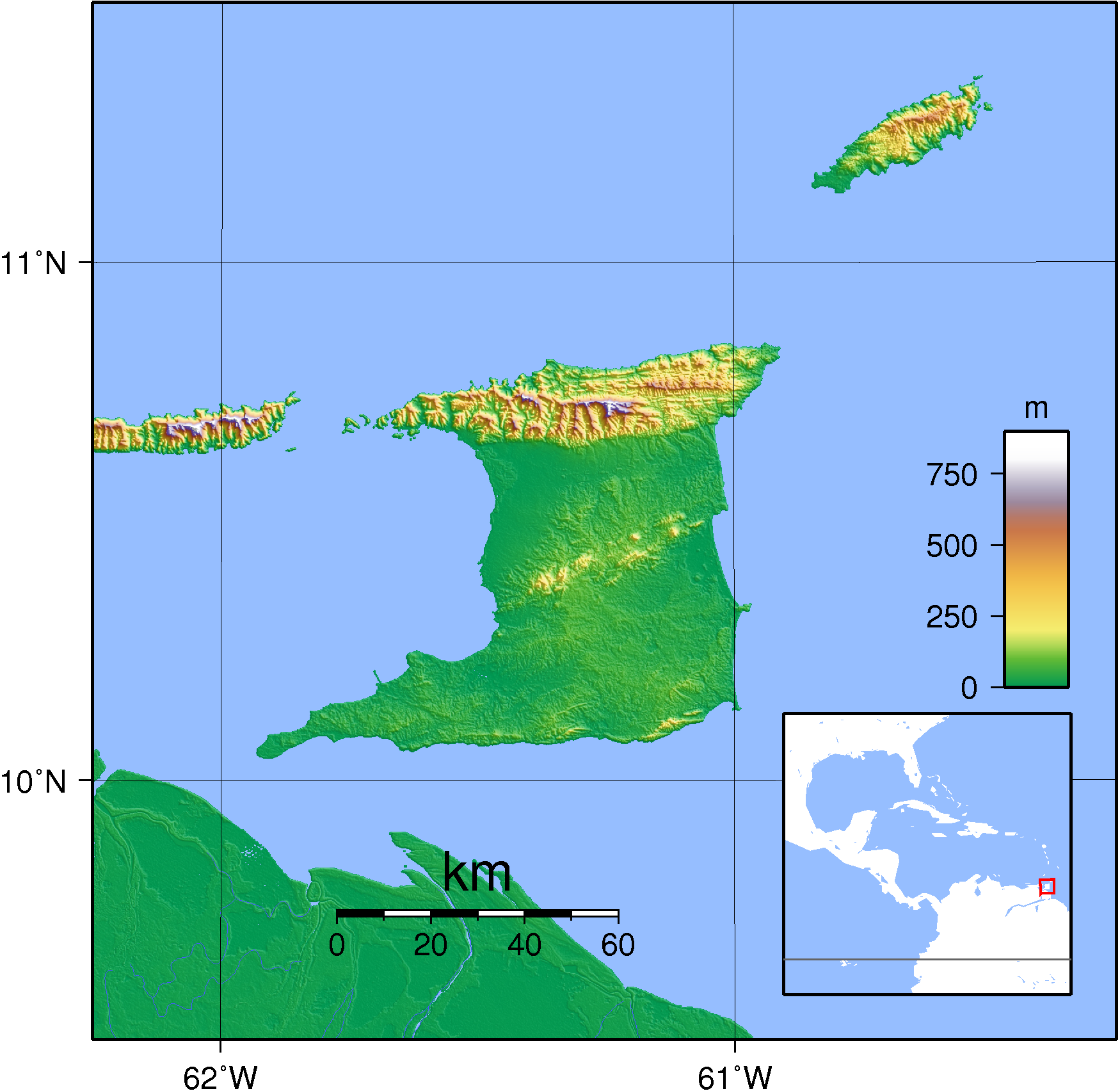
- Region: Caribbean
- Coordinates: 11°00′N 61°00′W
- Area
  - Total: 5,128 km^{2} (1,980 sq mi)
- Coastline: 362 km (225 mi)
- Highest point: El Cerro del Aripo; 940 m

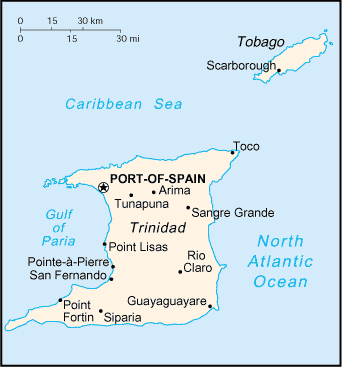
Map of Trinidad and Tobago

Trinidad and Tobago is an archipelagic republic in the southern Caribbean between the Caribbean Sea and the North Atlantic Ocean, northeast of Venezuela. They are southeasterly islands of the Lesser Antilles, Monos, Huevos, Gaspar Grande (or Gasparee), Little Tobago, and St. Giles Island. Trinidad is 11 km (6.8 mi) off the northeast coast of Venezuela and 130 km (81 mi) south of the Grenadines. The island measures 4,768 km^{2} (1,841 sq mi) in area (comprising 93.0% of the country's total area) with an average length of 80 km (50 mi) and an average width of 59 km (37 mi). The island appears rectangular in shape with three projecting peninsular corners. Tobago is 30 km (19 mi) northeast of Trinidad and measures about 298 km^{2} (115 sq mi) in area, or 5.8% of the country's area, 41 km (25.5 mi) in length and 12 km (7.5 mi) at its greatest width. The island is cigar-shaped in appearance, with a northeast–southwest alignment.

== Physical geography ==
Trinidad is traversed by three distinct mountain ranges that are a continuation of the Venezuelan coastal cordillera. The Northern Range, an outlier of the Andes Mountains of Venezuela, consists of rugged hills that parallel the coast. This range rises into two peaks. The highest, El Cerro del Aripo, is 940 metres (3,084 ft) high; the other, El Tucuche, reaches 936 metres (3,071 ft). The Central Range extends diagonally across the island and is a low-lying range with swampy areas rising to rolling hills; its maximum elevation is 325 metres (1,066 ft). The Caroni Plain, composed of alluvial sediment, extends southward, separating the Northern Range and Central Range. The Southern Range consists of a broken line of hills with a maximum elevation of 305 metres (1,001 ft).

There are numerous rivers and streams on the island of Trinidad; the most significant are the Ortoire River, 50 kilometres (31.1 mi) long, which extends eastward into the Atlantic, and the 40-kilometre (24.9 mi)-long Caroni River, reaching westward into the Gulf of Paria. Most of the soils of Trinidad are fertile, with the exception of the sandy and unstable terrain found in the southern part of the island.

Tobago is mountainous and dominated by the Main Ridge, which is 29 kilometres (18 mi) long with elevations up to 550 meters. There are deep, fertile valleys running north and south of the Main Ridge. The southwestern tip of the island has a coral platform. Although Tobago is volcanic in origin, there are no active volcanoes. Forestation covers 43% of the island. There are numerous rivers and streams, but flooding and erosion are less severe than in Trinidad. The coastline is indented with numerous bays, beaches, and narrow coastal plains.

Tobago has several small satellite islands. The largest of these, Little Tobago, is starfish-shaped, hilly, and 1.2 km^{2} (0.46 sq mi).

Because it was once part of continental South America, Trinidad has an assortment of tropical vegetation and wildlife considerably more varied than that of most Caribbean islands. Tobago has a generally similar but less varied assortment.

=== Geology ===
Geologically, the islands are not part of the Lesser Antilles Volcanic Arc. Rather, Trinidad was once part of the South American mainland and is situated on its continental shelf, and Tobago is part of a sunken island arc chain related to the Pacific-derived Caribbean Plate. The islands are separated from the continent of South America by the Gulf of Paria; Bocas del Dragón, a 19-kilometre (11.8 mi)-wide northern passage; and Serpent's Mouth, a 14-kilometre (8.7 mi)-wide southern passage.

The Northern Range consists mainly of Upper Jurassic and Cretaceous metamorphic rocks. The Northern Lowlands (East–West Corridor and Caroni Plains) consist of younger shallow marine clastic sediments. South of this, the Central Range fold and thrust belt consists of Cretaceous and Eocene sedimentary rocks, with Miocene formations along the southern and eastern flanks. The Naparima Plains and the Nariva Swamp form the southern shoulder of this uplift.

The Southern Lowlands consist of Miocene and Pliocene sands, clays, and gravels. These overlie oil and natural gas deposits, especially north of the Los Bajos Fault. The Southern Range forms the third anticlinal uplift. It consists of several chains of hills, most famous being the Trinity Hills. The rocks consist of sandstones, shales, siltstones and clays formed in the Miocene and uplifted in the Pleistocene. Oil sands and mud volcanoes are especially common in this area.

== Political geography ==
Regional corporations and municipalities of Trinidad and Tobago

Trinidad is split into 14 regional corporations and municipalities, consisting of 9 regions and 5 municipalities, which have a limited level of autonomy. The various councils are made up of a mixture of elected and appointed members. Elections are due to be held every three years with the last elections held in 2019. The island of Tobago is administered by the Tobago House of Assembly.

== Climate ==
Köppen climate map of the islands of the West Indies, with the climate of Trinidad and Tobago visible in the southeast corner.

The country lies in the tropics, enjoying a generally pleasant maritime tropical climate influenced by the northeast trade winds. In Trinidad the annual mean temperature is 26 °C (78.8 °F), and the average maximum temperature is 34 °C (93.2 °F). The highest temperature ever was 37.8 degrees Celsius. The lowest (coldest felt) temperature recorded in Trinidad was 16.1 °C (61.0 °F) in January 1964. The humidity is high, particularly during the rainy season, when it averages 85 to 87%. The island receives an average of 2,110 millimeters (83.1 in) of rainfall per year, usually concentrated in the months of June through December, when brief, intense showers frequently occur. Precipitation is highest in the Northern Range, which may receive as much as 3,810 millimeters (150 in). During the dry season, drought plagues the island's central interior. Tobago's climate is similar to Trinidad's but slightly cooler. Its rainy season extends from June to December; the annual rainfall is 2,500 millimeters (98.4 in). The islands lie outside the hurricane belt; despite this, Hurricane Flora damaged Tobago in 1963. The hurricane killed 18 people on Tobago and caused $30:million in crop and property damages (1963 USD). Tropical Storm Alma hit Trinidad in 1974, causing damage before reaching full strength. Wind gusts reached 91 mph (147 km/h) at the Savonette gas field during the storm.

Climate data for Port of Spain
| Month | Jan | Feb | Mar | Apr | May | Jun | Jul | Aug | Sep | Oct | Nov | Dec | Year |
|---|---|---|---|---|---|---|---|---|---|---|---|---|---|
| Record high °C (°F) | 33.2 (91.8) | 33.0 (91.4) | 34.9 (94.8) | 34.9 (94.8) | 35.3 (95.5) | 34.4 (93.9) | 33.5 (92.3) | 34.2 (93.6) | 37.0 (98.6) | 35.5 (95.9) | 33.8 (92.8) | 33.2 (91.8) | 37.0 (98.6) |
| Mean daily maximum °C (°F) | 28.0 (82.4) | 28.9 (84.0) | 30.3 (86.5) | 31.0 (87.8) | 33.1 (91.6) | 31.5 (88.7) | 31.3 (88.3) | 31.7 (89.1) | 32.2 (90.0) | 32.2 (90.0) | 31.5 (88.7) | 31.1 (88.0) | 31.1 (87.9) |
| Mean daily minimum °C (°F) | 17.0 (62.6) | 19.2 (66.6) | 20.7 (69.3) | 22.0 (71.6) | 23.0 (73.4) | 23.3 (73.9) | 23.0 (73.4) | 23.0 (73.4) | 23.1 (73.6) | 22.6 (72.7) | 22.3 (72.1) | 21.0 (69.8) | 21.7 (71.0) |
| Record low °C (°F) | 14.6 (58.3) | 16.1 (61.0) | 16.7 (62.1) | 17.2 (63.0) | 18.9 (66.0) | 19.7 (67.5) | 18.3 (64.9) | 18.9 (66.0) | 19.4 (66.9) | 19.4 (66.9) | 17.9 (64.2) | 15.7 (60.3) | 14.6 (58.3) |
| Average rainfall mm (inches) | 42.9 (1.69) | 39.8 (1.57) | 16.9 (0.67) | 27.7 (1.09) | 67.5 (2.66) | 155.6 (6.13) | 193.6 (7.62) | 244.0 (9.61) | 190.5 (7.50) | 143.3 (5.64) | 210.5 (8.29) | 75.7 (2.98) | 1,408 (55.43) |
| Average rainy days (≥ 0.1 mm) | 11 | 10 | 6 | 6 | 11 | 20 | 21 | 19 | 16 | 15 | 18 | 13 | 166 |
| Average relative humidity (%) | 81 | 80 | 77 | 77 | 79 | 84 | 84 | 84 | 84 | 85 | 86 | 84 | 82 |
| Mean monthly sunshine hours | 241.3 | 231.3 | 248.3 | 237.5 | 233.2 | 183.7 | 205.9 | 212.5 | 197.1 | 207.4 | 197.7 | 214.5 | 2,610.4 |
Source 1: World Meteorological Organization
Source 2: NOAA (sun, extremes and humidity)

Climate data for Scarborough, Tobago
| Month | Jan | Feb | Mar | Apr | May | Jun | Jul | Aug | Sep | Oct | Nov | Dec | Year |
|---|---|---|---|---|---|---|---|---|---|---|---|---|---|
| Mean daily maximum °C (°F) | 29 (85) | 30 (86) | 31 (87) | 31 (88) | 31 (88) | 31 (87) | 30 (86) | 31 (87) | 31 (87) | 31 (87) | 30 (86) | 29 (85) | 30 (86) |
| Mean daily minimum °C (°F) | 22 (72) | 22 (72) | 23 (73) | 24 (75) | 24 (76) | 24 (76) | 24 (75) | 24 (75) | 24 (75) | 24 (75) | 23 (74) | 23 (73) | 23 (74) |
| Average precipitation mm (inches) | 48 (1.9) | 48 (1.9) | 43 (1.7) | 46 (1.8) | 64 (2.5) | 150 (5.8) | 190 (7.4) | 160 (6.4) | 170 (6.7) | 220 (8.7) | 210 (8.1) | 160 (6.3) | 1,505 (59.27) |
Source: Weatherbase

Climate data for San Fernando
| Month | Jan | Feb | Mar | Apr | May | Jun | Jul | Aug | Sep | Oct | Nov | Dec | Year |
|---|---|---|---|---|---|---|---|---|---|---|---|---|---|
| Mean daily maximum °C (°F) | 29.3 (84.7) | 29.7 (85.5) | 30.3 (86.5) | 31.2 (88.2) | 31.0 (87.8) | 30.2 (86.4) | 30.1 (86.2) | 30.6 (87.1) | 31.1 (88.0) | 30.9 (87.6) | 30.6 (87.1) | 29.8 (85.6) | 30.4 (86.7) |
| Daily mean °C (°F) | 25.0 (77.0) | 25.0 (77.0) | 25.6 (78.1) | 26.5 (79.7) | 26.9 (80.4) | 26.3 (79.3) | 26.2 (79.2) | 26.4 (79.5) | 26.7 (80.1) | 26.6 (79.9) | 26.3 (79.3) | 25.5 (77.9) | 26.1 (79.0) |
| Mean daily minimum °C (°F) | 20.7 (69.3) | 20.4 (68.7) | 20.9 (69.6) | 21.8 (71.2) | 22.8 (73.0) | 22.5 (72.5) | 22.4 (72.3) | 22.3 (72.1) | 22.4 (72.3) | 22.4 (72.3) | 22.0 (71.6) | 21.2 (70.2) | 21.8 (71.3) |
| Average rainfall mm (inches) | 77 (3.0) | 42 (1.7) | 43 (1.7) | 56 (2.2) | 84 (3.3) | 193 (7.6) | 214 (8.4) | 235 (9.3) | 182 (7.2) | 157 (6.2) | 184 (7.2) | 132 (5.2) | 1,599 (63) |
Source: Climate-data.org

== Statistics ==

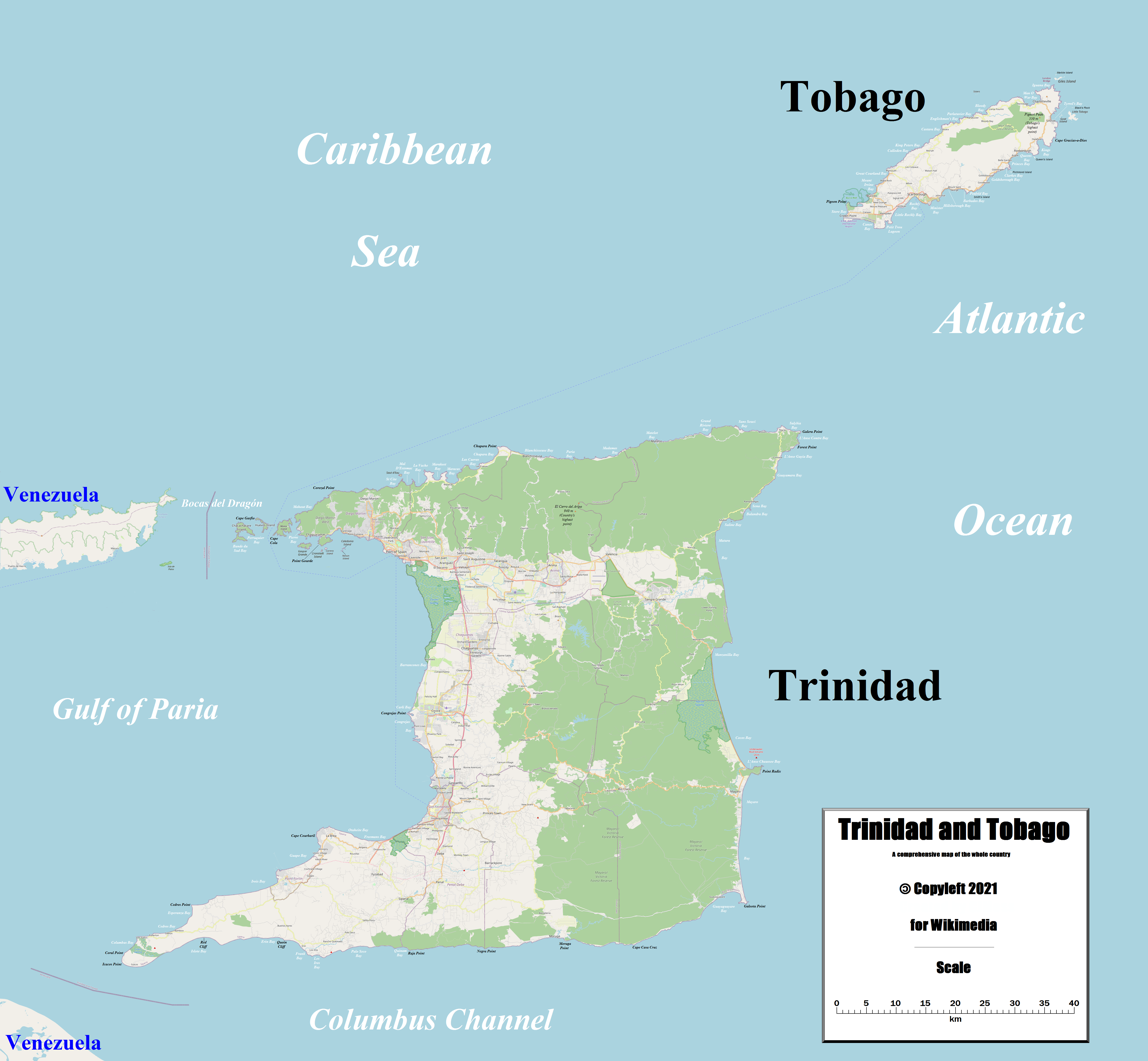
Enlargeable comprehensive map

Area:
total: 5,128 km^{2}
land: 5,128 km^{2}
water: negligible

Coastline: 362 km

Maritime claims:
contiguous zone: 24 nmi (44.4 km; 27.6 mi)
continental shelf: 200 nmi (370.4 km; 230.2 mi) or to the outer edge of the continental margin
exclusive economic zone: 200 nmi (370.4 km; 230.2 mi)
territorial sea: 12 nmi (22.2 km; 13.8 mi)

Terrain: mostly plains with some hills and low mountains

Extreme points:

Northernmost point: Marble Island, Tobago

Southernmost point: Icacos, Siparia region, Trinidad Island

Westernmost point: Icacos, Siparia region, Trinidad Island

Easternmost point: Easternmost tip of Little Tobago, Tobago

Lowest point: Caribbean Sea 0 m

Highest point: El Cerro del Aripo, Trinidad 940 m

Natural resources: petroleum, natural gas, asphalt

Land use:
arable land: 4.9%
permanent crops: 4.3%

permanent pasture: 1.4%

forest: 44%
other: 45.4% (2018 est.)

Irrigated land: 70 km^{2} (2012)

Total renewable water resources: 3.84 billion m³ (2017)

== See also ==
- Trinidad and Tobago dry forests
- Biota of Trinidad and Tobago
- List of rivers of Trinidad and Tobago
- List of islands of Trinidad and Tobago
