= Lenagan Island =

Island in Trinidad and Tobago

Coordinates: 10°39′40.73″N 61°35′57.64″W

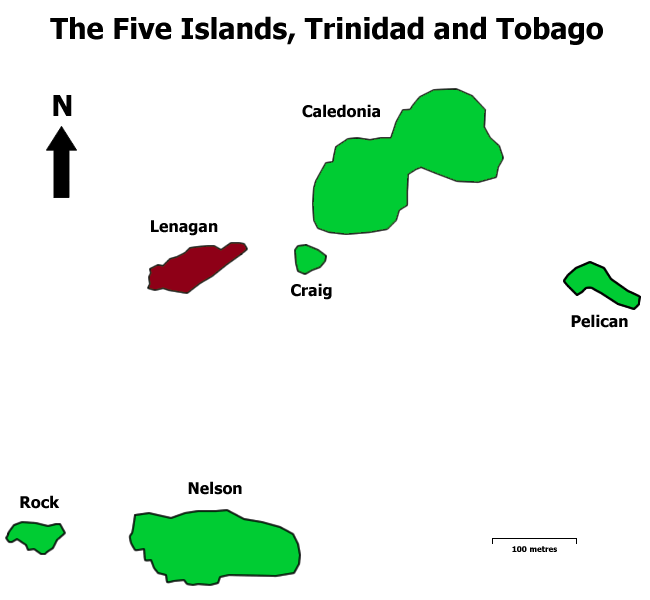
Map of the Five Islands. Lenagan Island can be seen at the centre left of the map.

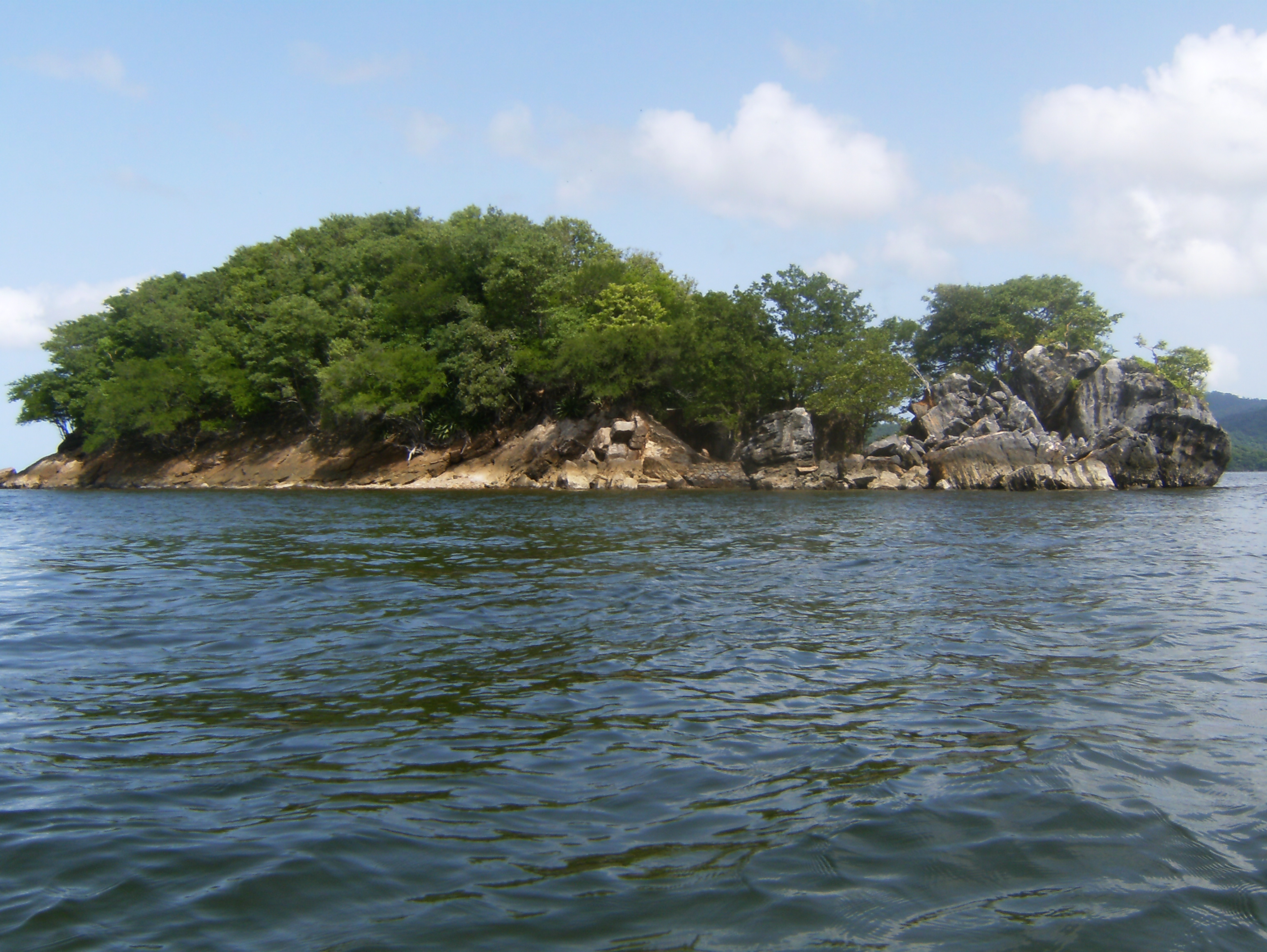

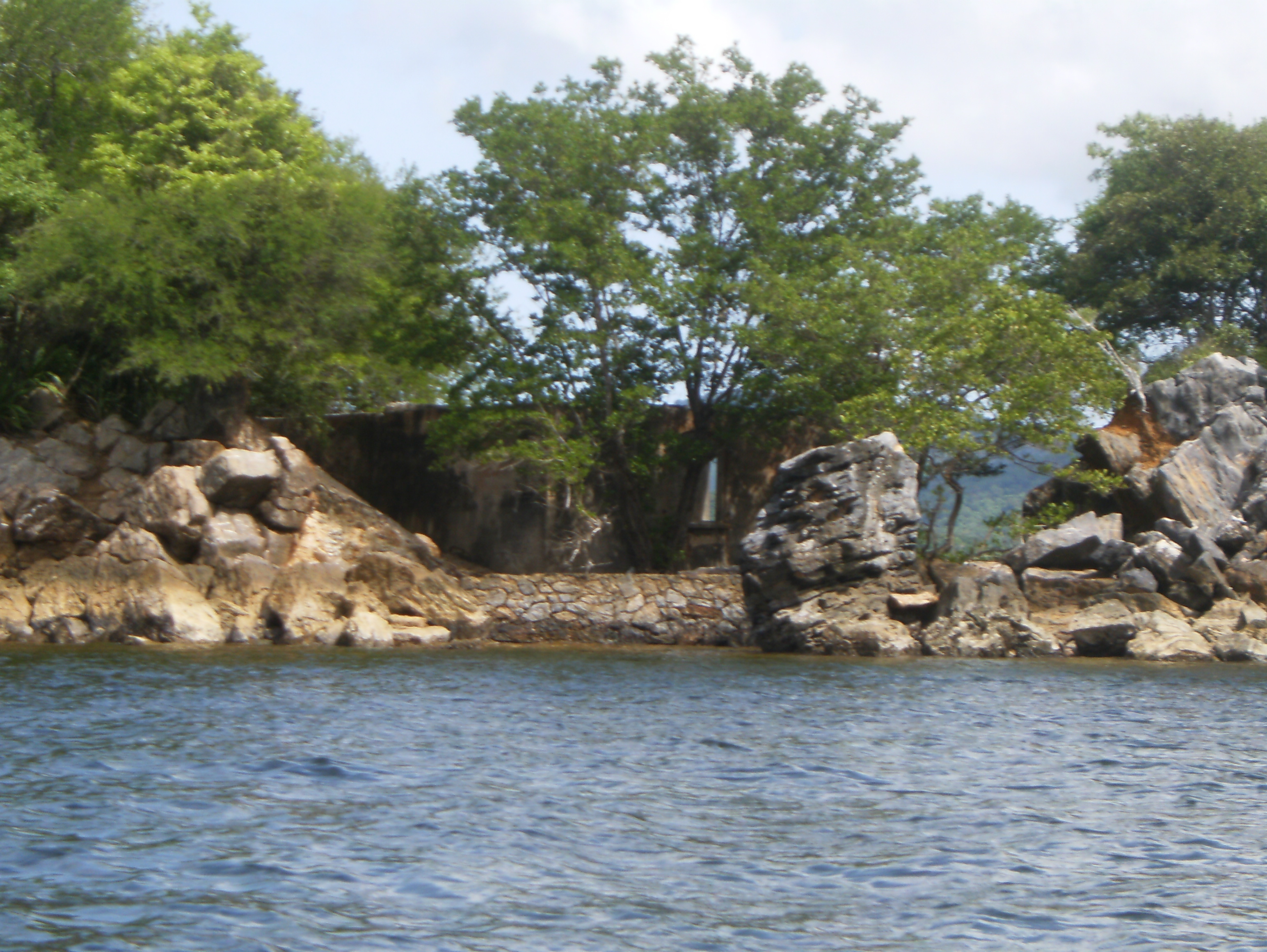
View of structures on Lenagan Island

Lenagan Island is a small island in the Republic of Trinidad and Tobago. At only 0.27 hectares (<1 acre), it is one of The Five Islands lying west of the Port of Spain in the Gulf of Paria.

== History ==
Lenagan Island, named after its early 19th century owner Louis Lenagan, was completely uninhabited before and during Lenagan's lifetime. Following his death, the island was passed to his son, who died shortly after. The island was then repossessed by the government and used as a quarantine locale beginning 1866.

Immigrants, especially East Indian indentured laborers, bound for Trinidad and Tobago often caught illnesses and contagious diseases during their sea journeys. When nearby Nelson Island began to be used for quarantine, Lenagan became a hospital for the critically ill and highly contagious immigrants. Foreigners who died on Lenagan were illegally cremated on a platform on the Western end of the island.

Currently, the island is under the protection of the National Trust of Trinidad and Tobago as a heritage site. It is uninhabited, only housing wildlife and the hospital's ruins.

== See also ==
- List of islands of Trinidad and Tobago
