= Rock Island (Trinidad and Tobago) =

Island in Trinidad and Tobago

Coordinates: 10°39′30.51″N 61°36′3.46″W

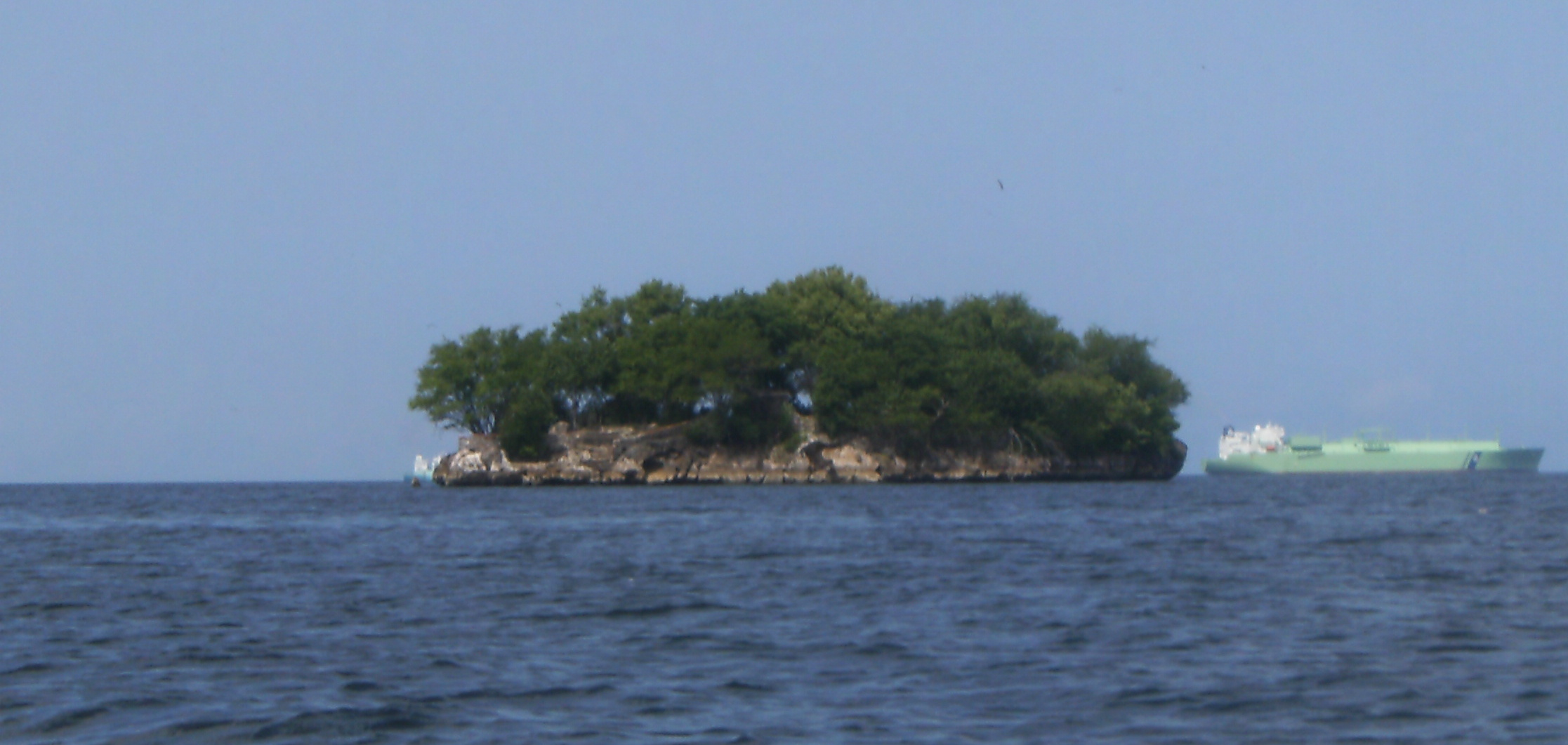
- Rock Island, as seen from the eastern side of the island

- Location within Trinidad and Tobago

Geography
- Total islands: 1

Administration
- Trinidad and Tobago

Demographics
- Population: Uninhabited (2015)

Additional information
- Member of the Five islands group of islands

Rock Island is a small island in Trinidad and Tobago, part of the Five Islands group of islands. It is located in the Gulf of Paria, approximately 2 kilometres off the main island of Trinidad from Point Gourde. Of the "Five Islands", which are actually made up of six different islands, Rock is the second smallest (after Craig Island) and the most western of the group.

== Characteristics ==
Rock was named after its physical characteristics, due its small size and sparse vegetation. The island is very small, no more than 50 metres in length and 30 metres in breadth at its widest point. The island, as with the other Five Islands, is made up primarily of limestone, as the islands were geologically formed by a raised coral reef. Today the island is uninhabited, with remnants of its last use as a quarantine depot being reclaimed by trees.

== History ==
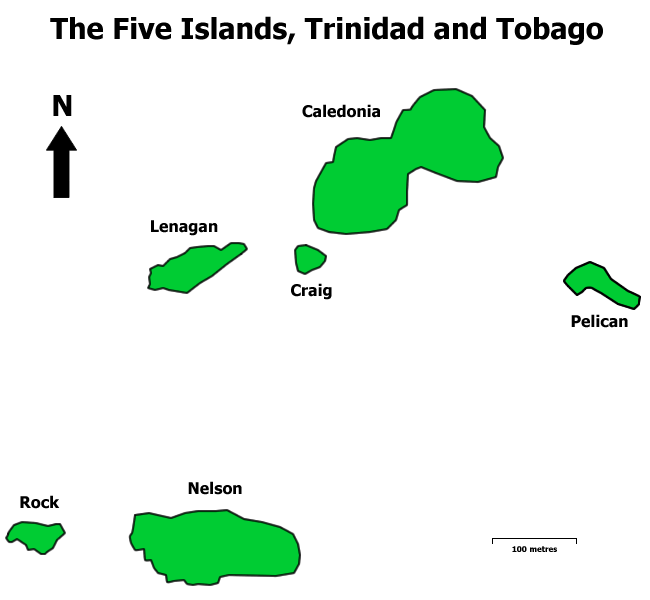
Map of the Five Islands. Rock can be seen in the bottom left corner of the map.

During Trinidad and Tobago's time as a Spanish colony up until 1818, the island was not believed to be inhabited. Its first documented usage was its leasing to wealthy private citizens by the Government in the early 19th century for use as a holiday home. It was first leased to T.F. Johnston who subsequently sold it to Doctor R. Mercer. Dr. Mercer then gave the lease as a present to Master Thomas Laughlin. During these times, a house was built on the island and rented out to the public. By 1888, the island was being used as a quarantine depot for first-class passengers of ships that may have highly contagious diseases. A flagpole was placed on the island, which when raised with a yellow flag warned that the inhabitant(s) had a certifiable contagious disease, which barred public communication with the island.

== See also ==
- List of islands of Trinidad and Tobago
