= Kronstadt (disambiguation) =

Kronstadt is a port city in Kronshtadtsky District, St. Petersburg, Russia.

Kronstadt may also refer to:

== Places ==
- Brașov, a city in Romania, originally a Saxon citadel known as Kronstadt
- Kunštát, a settlement in Orlické Záhoří, Czech Republic, formerly known as Kronstadt
- Kroonstad, a town in South Africa
- Cronstadt Island, in Trinidad and Tobago

== Other ==
- Kronshtadt-class battlecruiser, a class of battlecruisers that were never completed
- Kronstadt, a Soviet Sverdlov-class cruiser that was never completed
- Kronstadt, a Soviet Kresta II-class cruiser
- Kronstadt rebellion, anarcho-syndicalist uprising during the Russian revolution
