= Sisters' Rock =

Islands of Trinidad and Tobago

Coordinates: 11°20′03″N 60°38′36″W

Sisters’ Rocks are islands in the Republic of Trinidad and Tobago in the Caribbean Sea. It is located off the northern coast of Tobago directly north of Parlatuvier. Sisters' Rock is popular for snorkeling and scuba diving. The coral reef to the landward eastern side hosts black durgons, brown chromis, creole wrasse, and dwarf angelfish.

== See also ==
- Islands of Trinidad and Tobago
- List of Caribbean islands
