= Pelican Island (Trinidad and Tobago) =

Coordinates: 10°39′40.39″N 61°35′42.14″W

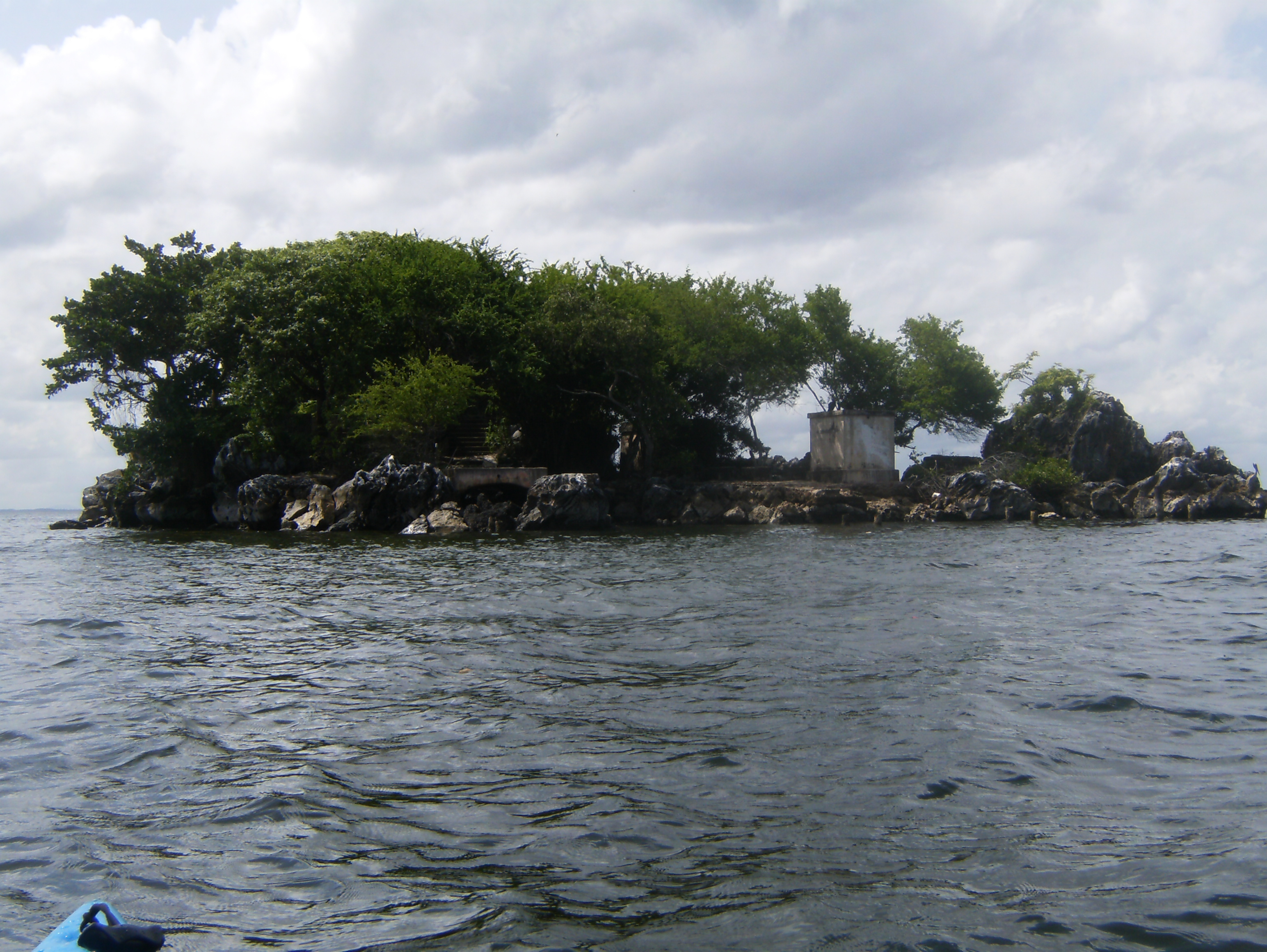

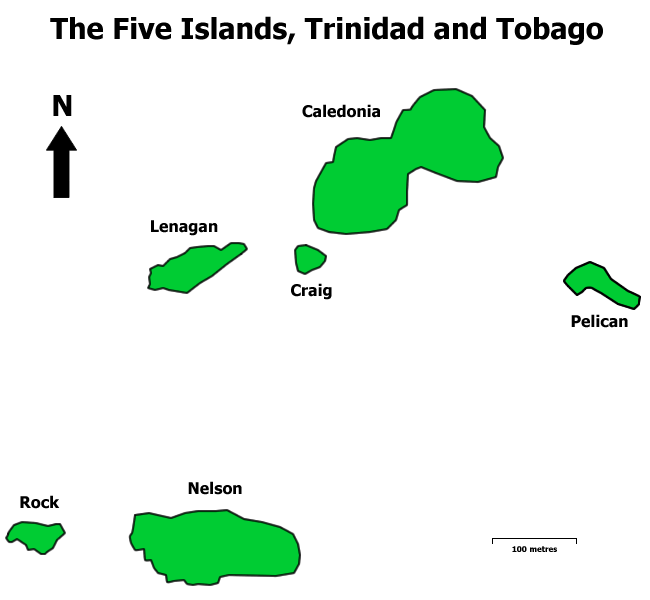
Map of the Five Islands. Pelican Island can be seen to the right of the map.

Pelican Island is an island in the Republic of Trinidad and Tobago. It is the fourth largest of “The Five Islands” group of six small islands lying west of Port of Spain in the Gulf of Paria.

== See also ==
- List of islands of Trinidad and Tobago
