= Caledonia Island =

Island in Trinidad and Tobago

Coordinates: 10°39′45.12″N 61°35′49.61″W

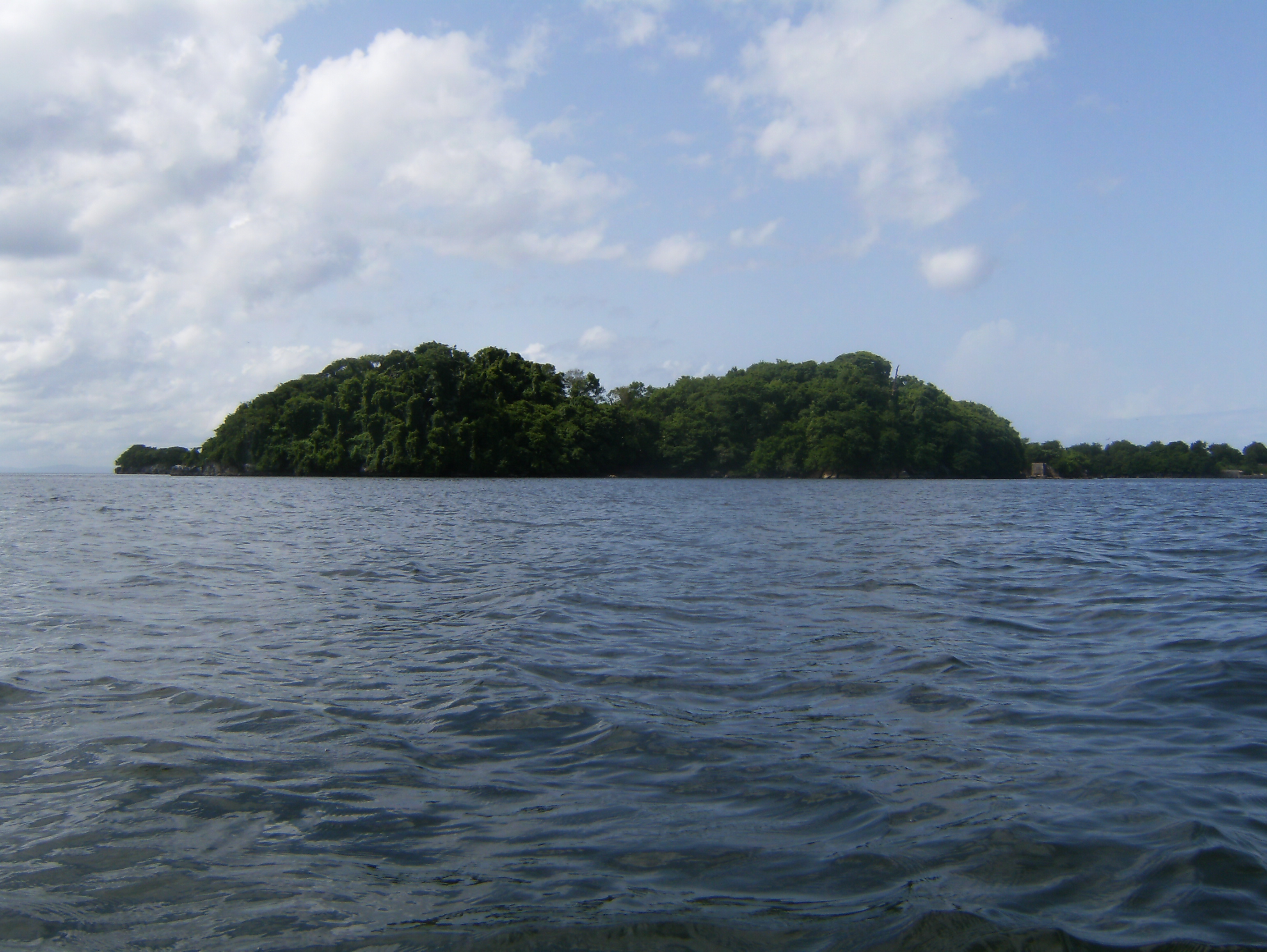
Caledonia Island as seen approaching it from the north

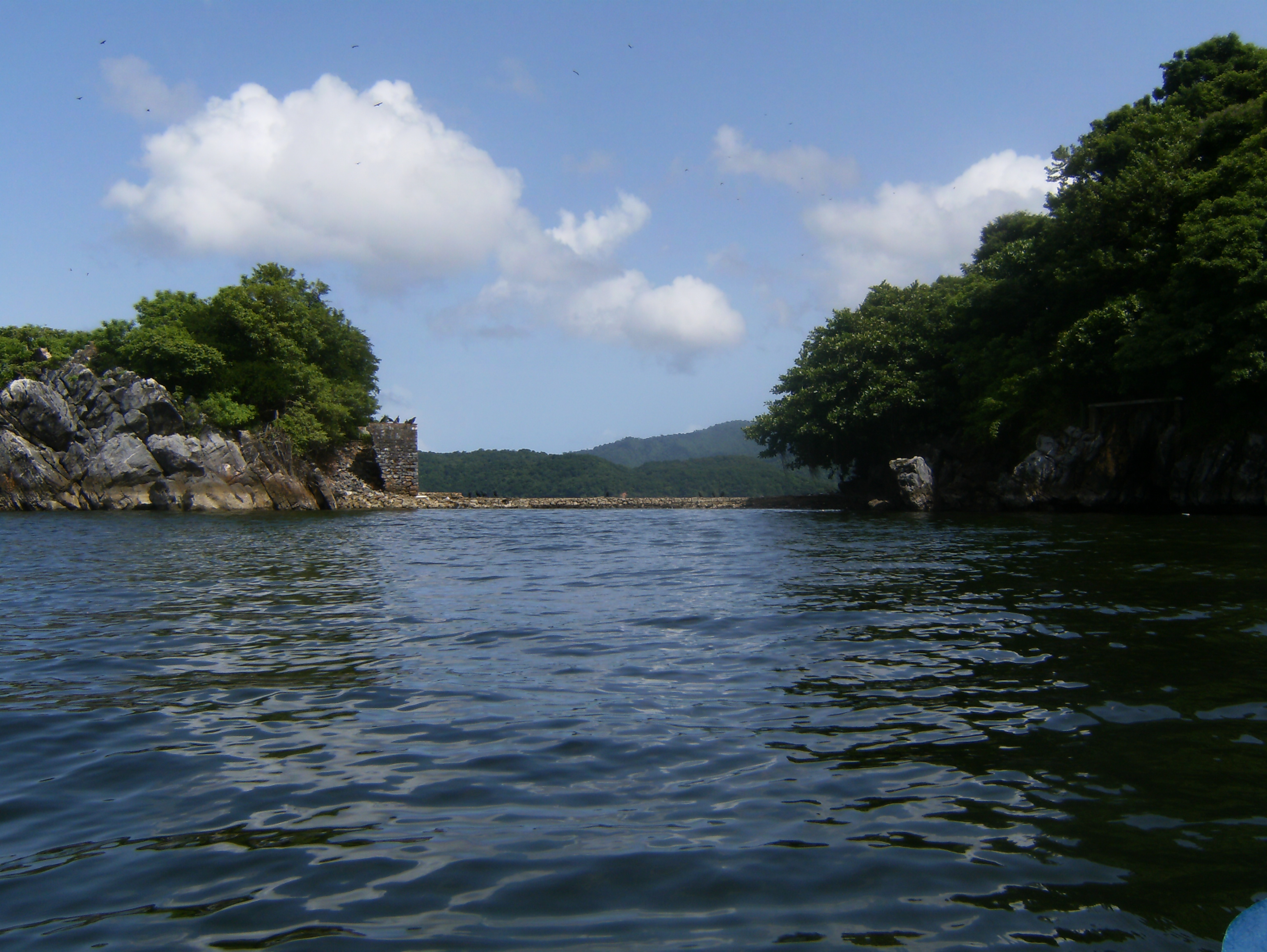
A man-made causeway connects Caledonia Island (right) with Craig Island (left).

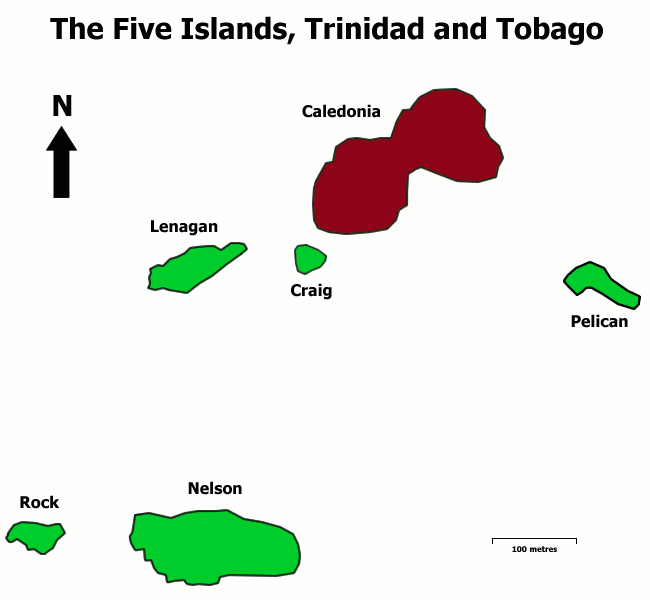
Caledonia Island on the map

Caledonia Island is an island in the Republic of Trinidad and Tobago. It is one of "The Five Islands" group of six small islands lying west of Port of Spain in the Gulf of Paria. It has an approximate area of just 1.9 hectares.

A Scotsman who went by the name of Lieutenant Herbert Mackworth, the Marshall of Trinidad during the 1850s, was granted Caledonia and Craig Island. Both of the islands were purchased again by another Scotsman, named Caldwell, who named the larger island "Caledonia", where previously it was called "Mackworth's Island". Based on a painting made by Michel-Jean Cazabon, Caldwell had built a house on the island which was used later for the honeymoon of George Harris, 3rd Baron Harris and his wife Sara Cummins, on the April 16 1850.

Refugees jews as well as some non-Europeans were fleeing persecution in Europe, during World War II to the island.

== See also ==
- List of islands of Trinidad and Tobago
