= Cronstadt Island =

Island in Trinidad and Tobago

Coordinates: 10.658729°N 61.63016°W

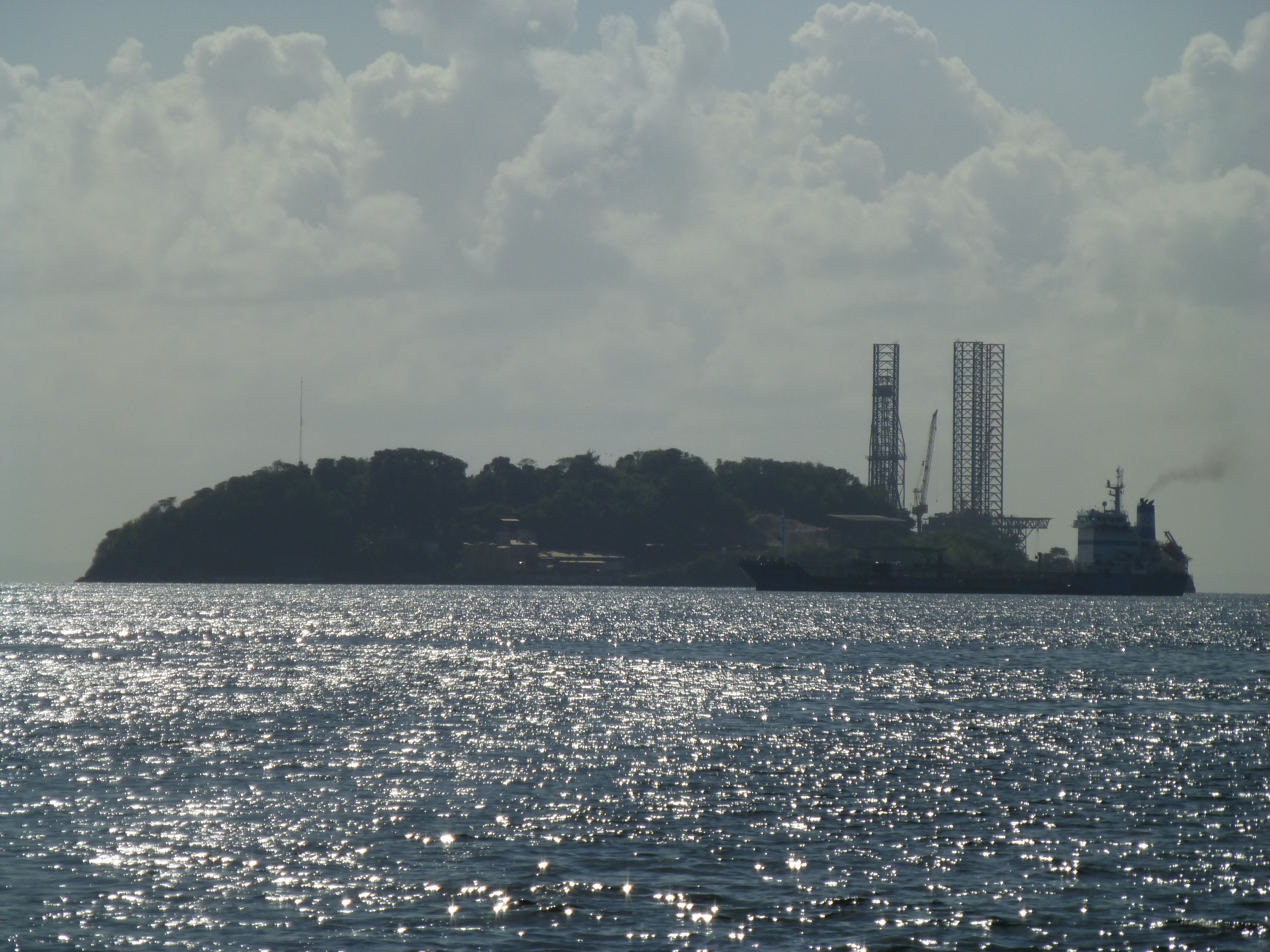
Cronstadt Island seen from the west.

Cronstadt Island or Kronstadt Island, previously also known as Begorrat Island, is an island in the Republic of Trinidad and Tobago with an area of 11,75 acres. Together with Carrera Island, they are referred to as the "San Diego Islands". It is an islet in the Gulf of Paria that lies between the “Bocas Islands” and “The Five Islands”.

== History ==
It consists of limestone, because of it being the remnants of a reef. From around 1850 to around 1970, limestone was mined on the island. In 1953, the entire western portion of the island (which comprises 8.75 acres) was leased to a mining company for the purpose of quarrying limestone, for a period of twenty-five years, with an option of renewal for a further term of twenty five years. The eastern side (comprising 3 acres) was leased to John Pius Dowling, the Roman Catholic Archbishop of Port of Spain in 1922 and was later purchased by the Crown in 1946. Today it is partially used for the processing of barytes for the oil industry and it is a wild life, despite its very limited vegetation, because of the Mining activities.

== Transport ==
The island has a harbor.

== See also ==
- Islands of Trinidad and Tobago
