= Nelson Island (Trinidad and Tobago) =

Island of the Five Islands in Trinidad and Tobago

Coordinates: 10°39′30.14″N 61°35′56.51″W

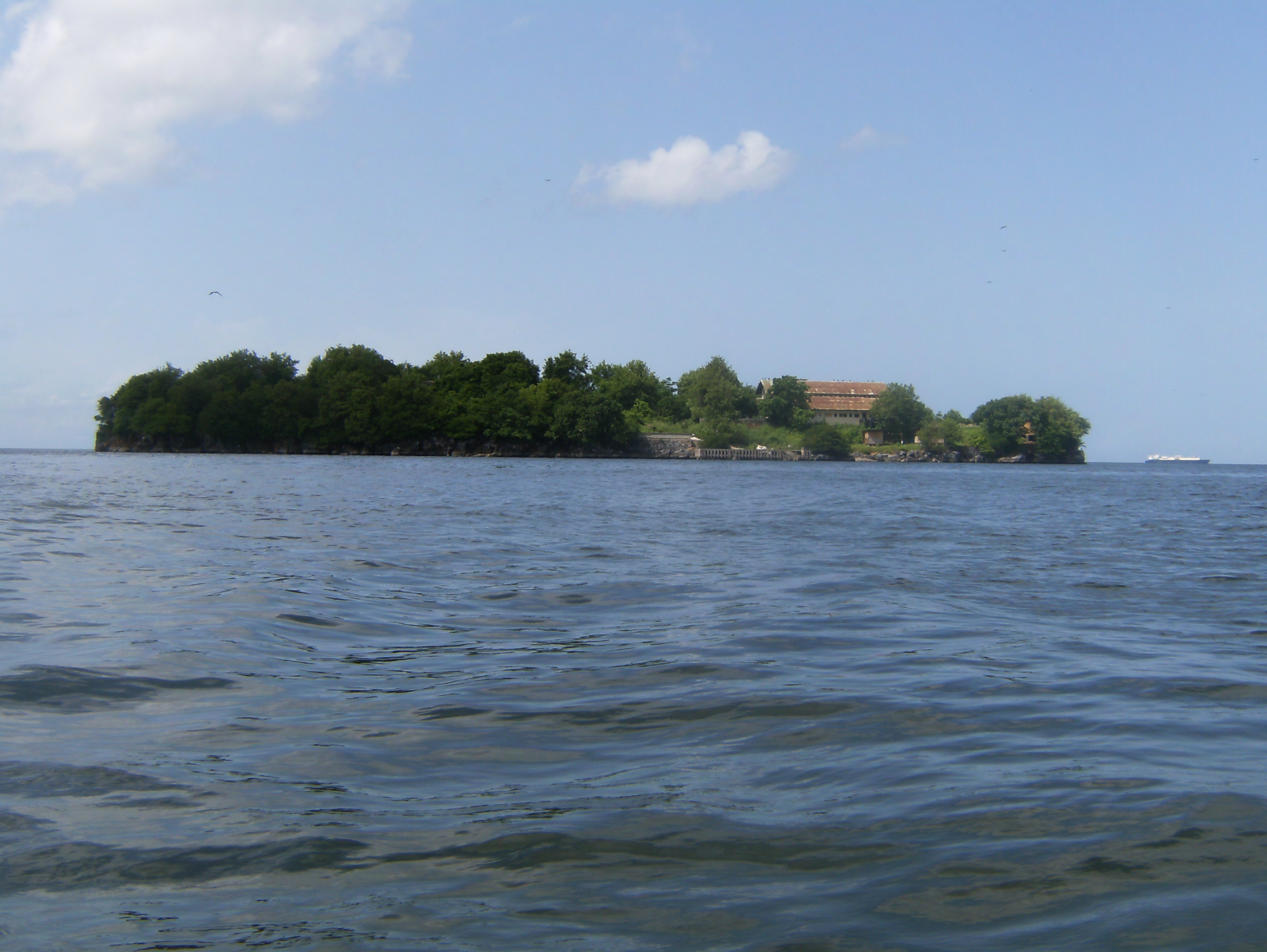
Nelson Island (2008)

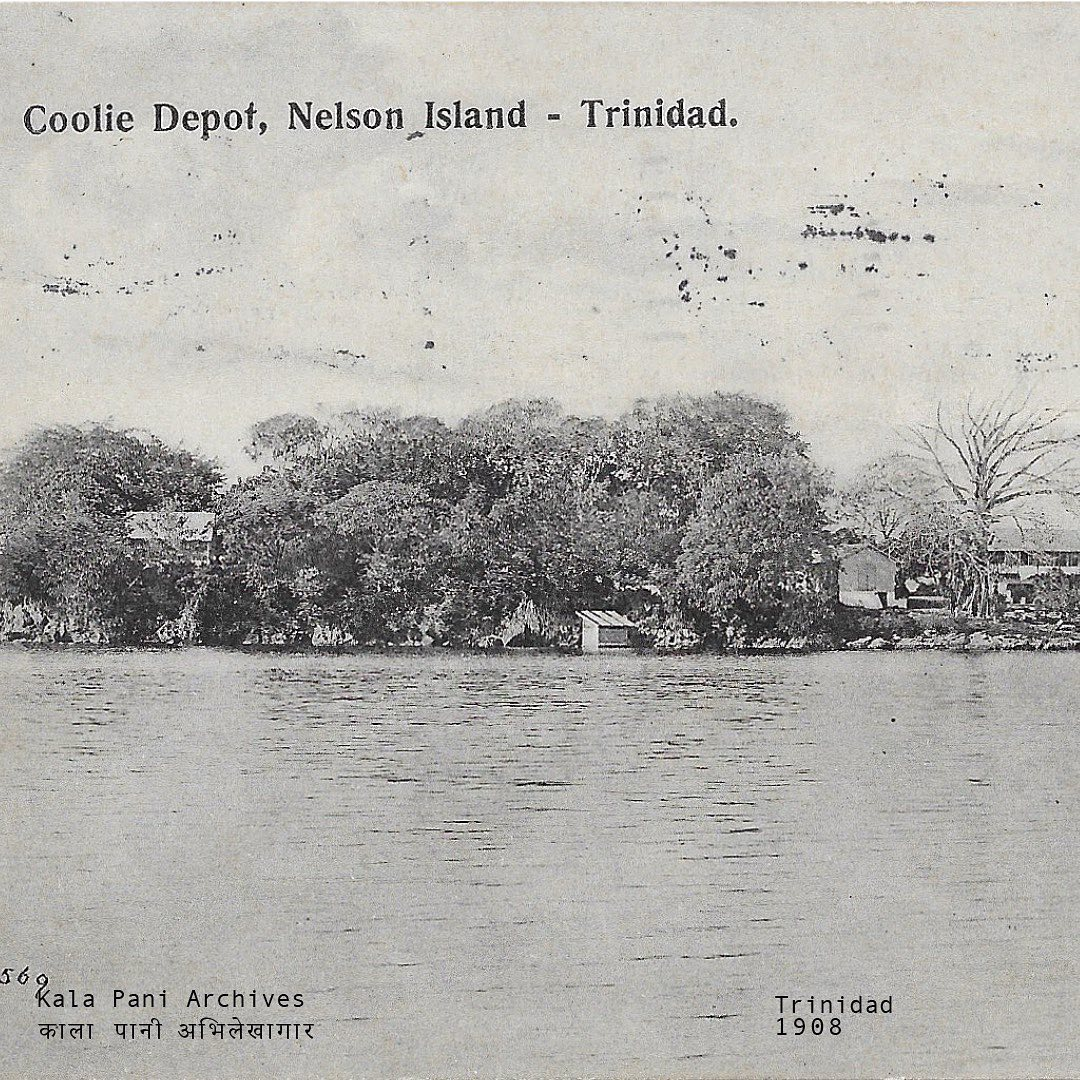
Nelson Island (1908)

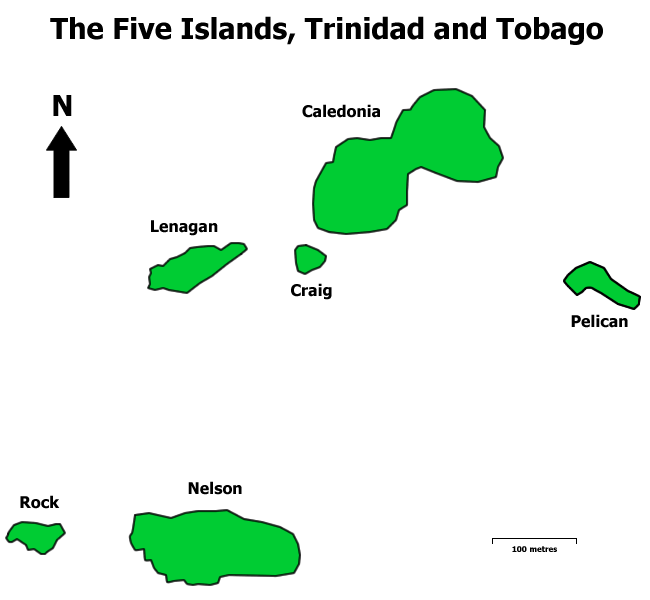
Map of the Five Islands. Nelson Island can be seen to the bottom of the map.

Nelson Island is one of the Five Islands which lie west of Port of Spain in the Gulf of Paria.

Nelson Island is famous as the disembarkation point and quarantine station for indentured immigrants to Trinidad and Tobago in the nineteenth and early twentieth century. For this reason, it has been called the Ellis Island of Trinidad and Tobago.

At Nelson Island, the Indian immigrants and the ship, food and stores were inspected by the Protector of Immigrants. Their bundles and blankets were fumigated and they were quarantined and allowed to recover and regain strength. This measure was designed to prevent the spread of diseases which might have been transported from India. Special effort was made to stop the spread of smallpox and measles. At Nelson Island, the immigrants were examined by a medical doctor and then transported by small boats to Port of Spain. The healthy ones were immediately sent to estates, the sick ones went to the Colonial Hospital in Port of Spain and those who only needed rest were kept at the Depot in Port of Spain.

In the 1930s, Nelson Island was used as a detention center for prisoners, among them Tubal Uriah Butler. During World War II, the Americans built a gun emplacement at the eastern end of the island and a causeway to Rock Island to the west. Nelson Island became a detention center again in 1970 following the Black Power Revolution. Among those who were detained there were Oilfields Workers' Trade Union president George Weekes, National Joint Action Committee leader Geddes Granger, Apoesho Mutope, Winston Suite, J.H.Bayliss Frederick, and Clive Nunez.

== See also ==
- List of islands of Trinidad and Tobago
