= Faralon Rock =

Island in Trinidad and Tobago

Coordinates: 10°16′32″N 61°29′6″W

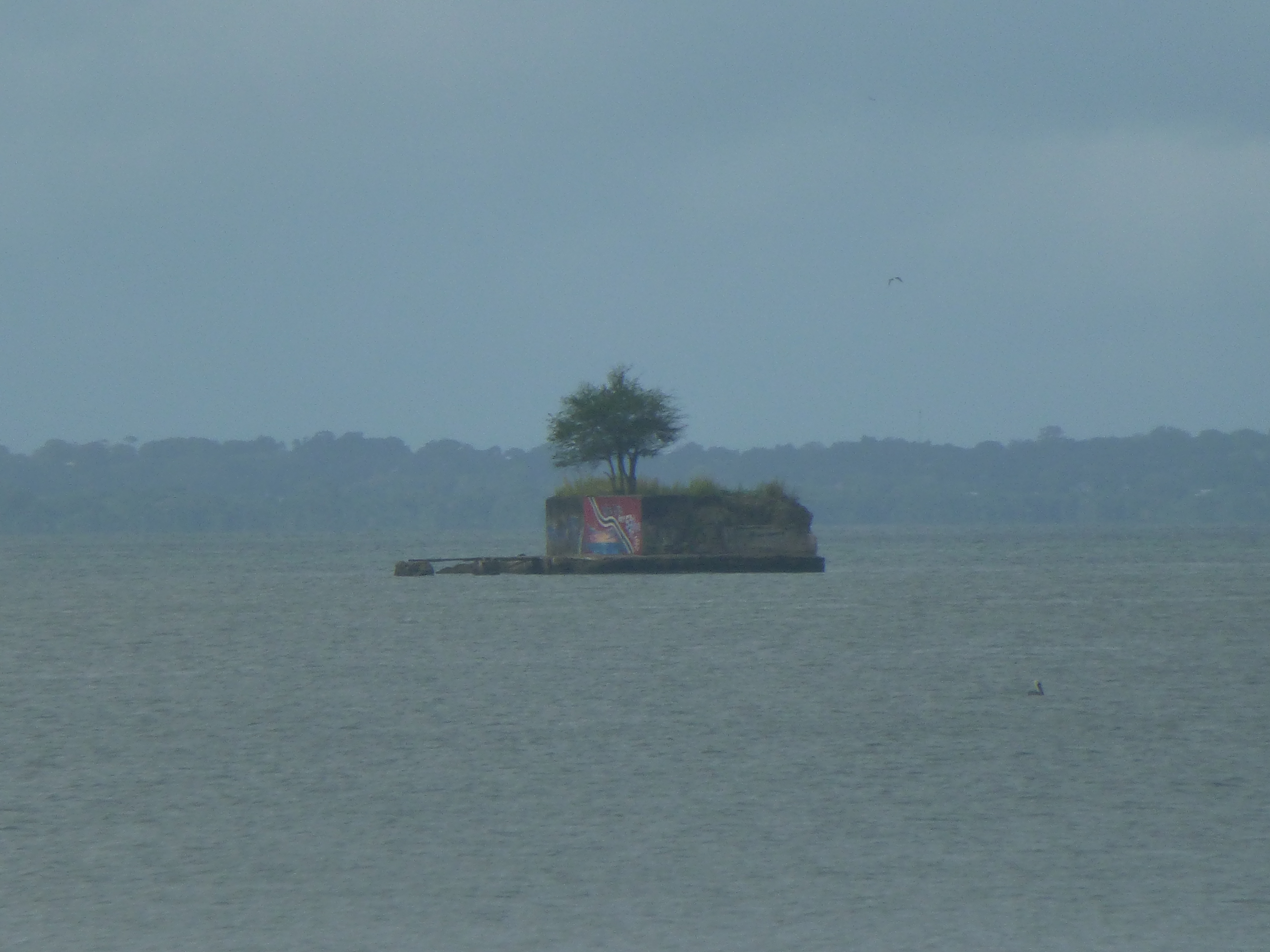
Farallon Rock

Faralon Rock, mostly spelled Farallon Rock, is a small island in Trinidad and Tobago. It is located in the Gulf of Paria just off the coast of San Fernando.
