= Craig Island =

Trinidadian island

Coordinates: 10°39′41.08″N 61°35′53.05″W

Craig Island (Trinidad and Tobago)

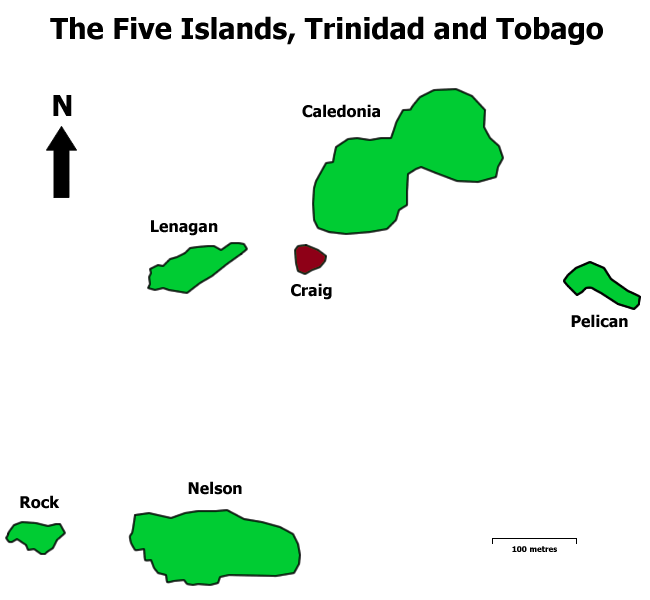
Map of the Five Islands. Craig Island can be seen at the centre of the map.

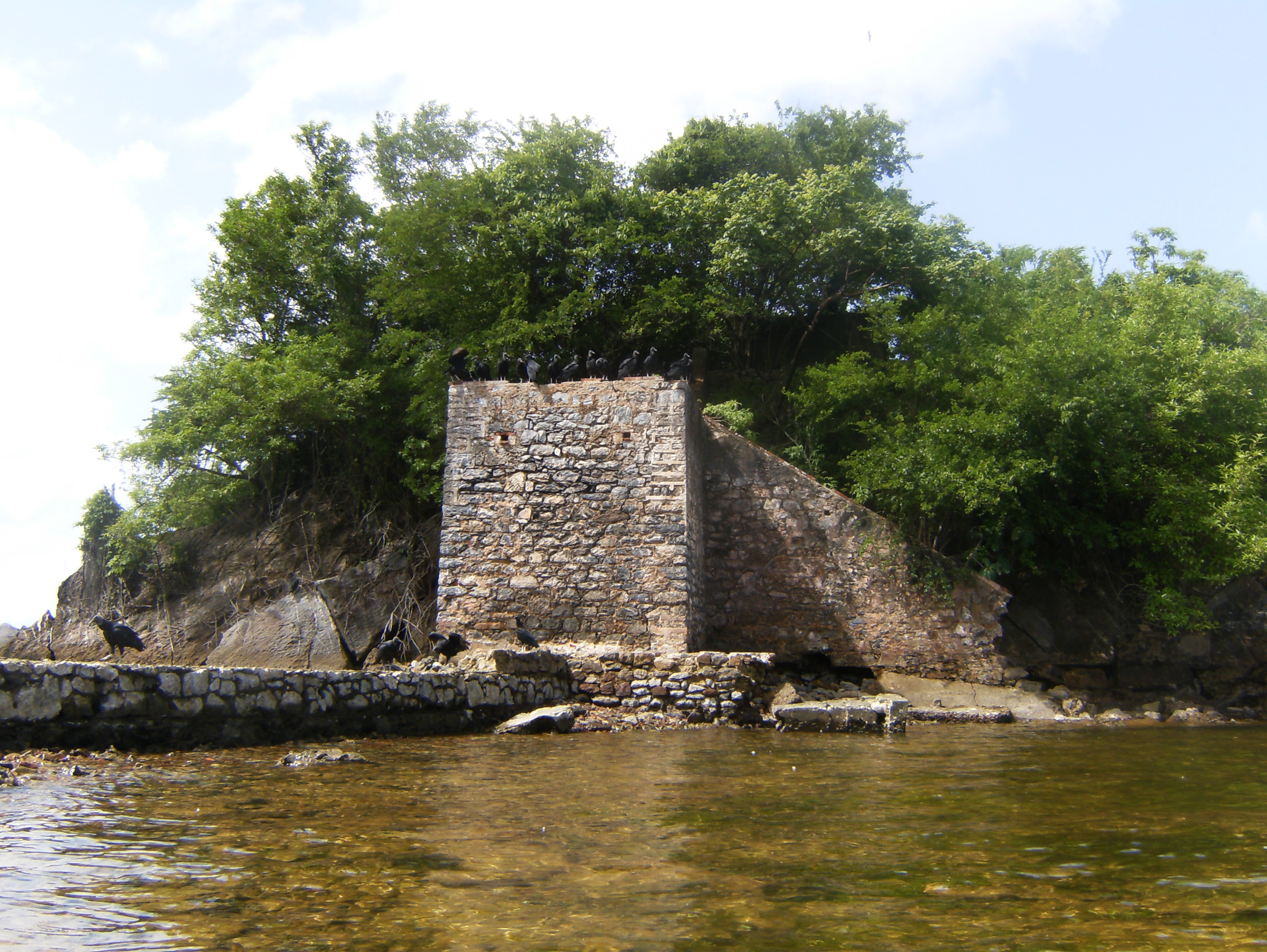
Partial view of Craig Island and the remnants of structures on the island.

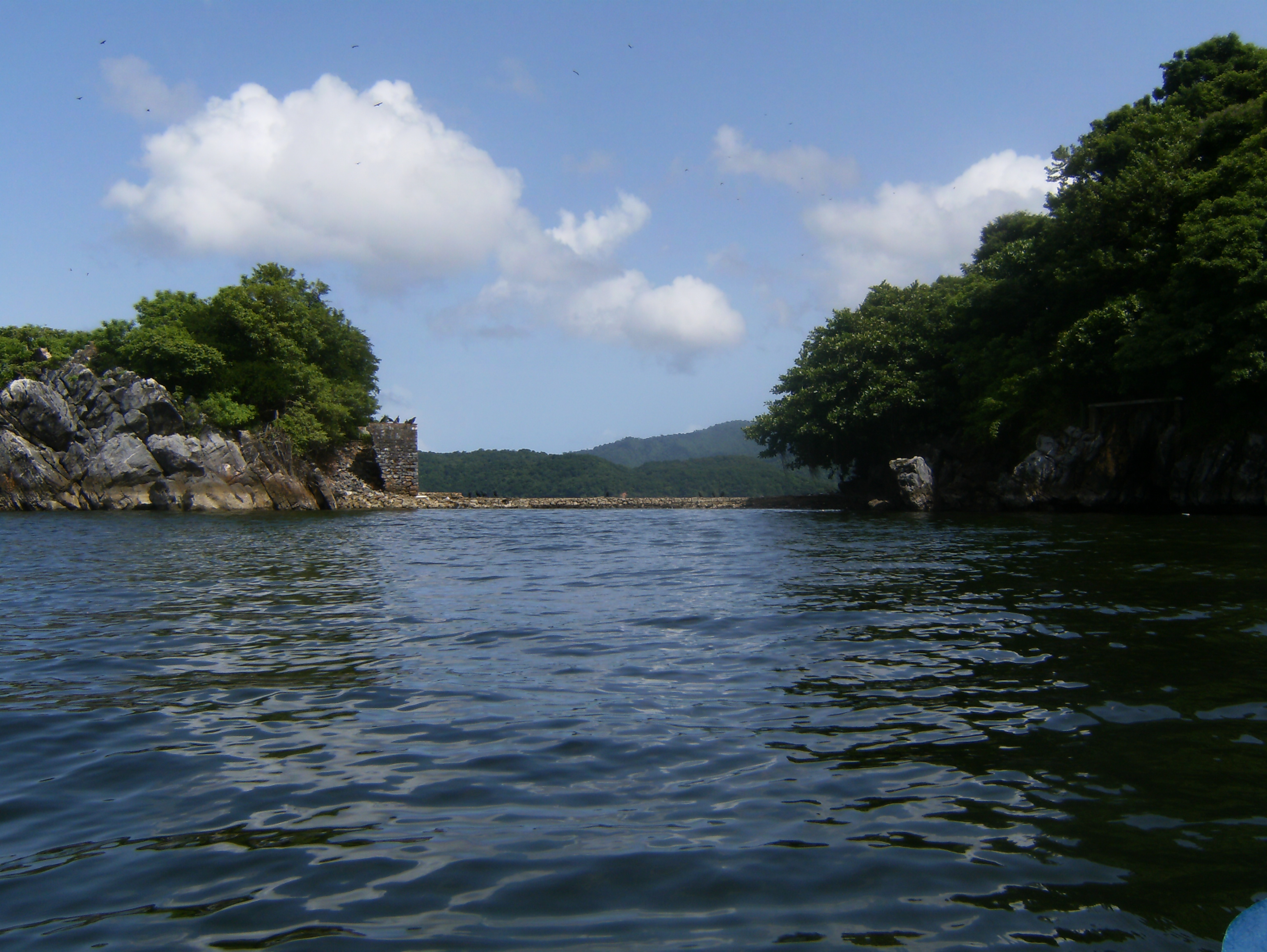
A man made causeway connects Caledonia Island (right) with Craig Island (left)

Craig Island is an island in the Republic of Trinidad and Tobago. It is one of “The Five Islands” group of six small islands lying west of Port of Spain in the Gulf of Paria. Craig Island is joined to Caledonia Island by a small causeway. The island is currently under the protection of the National Trust of Trinidad and Tobago as a heritage site.

== See also ==
- List of islands of Trinidad and Tobago
