= Saut d'Eau =

Island

Coordinates: 10°46.18′N 61°30.7′W

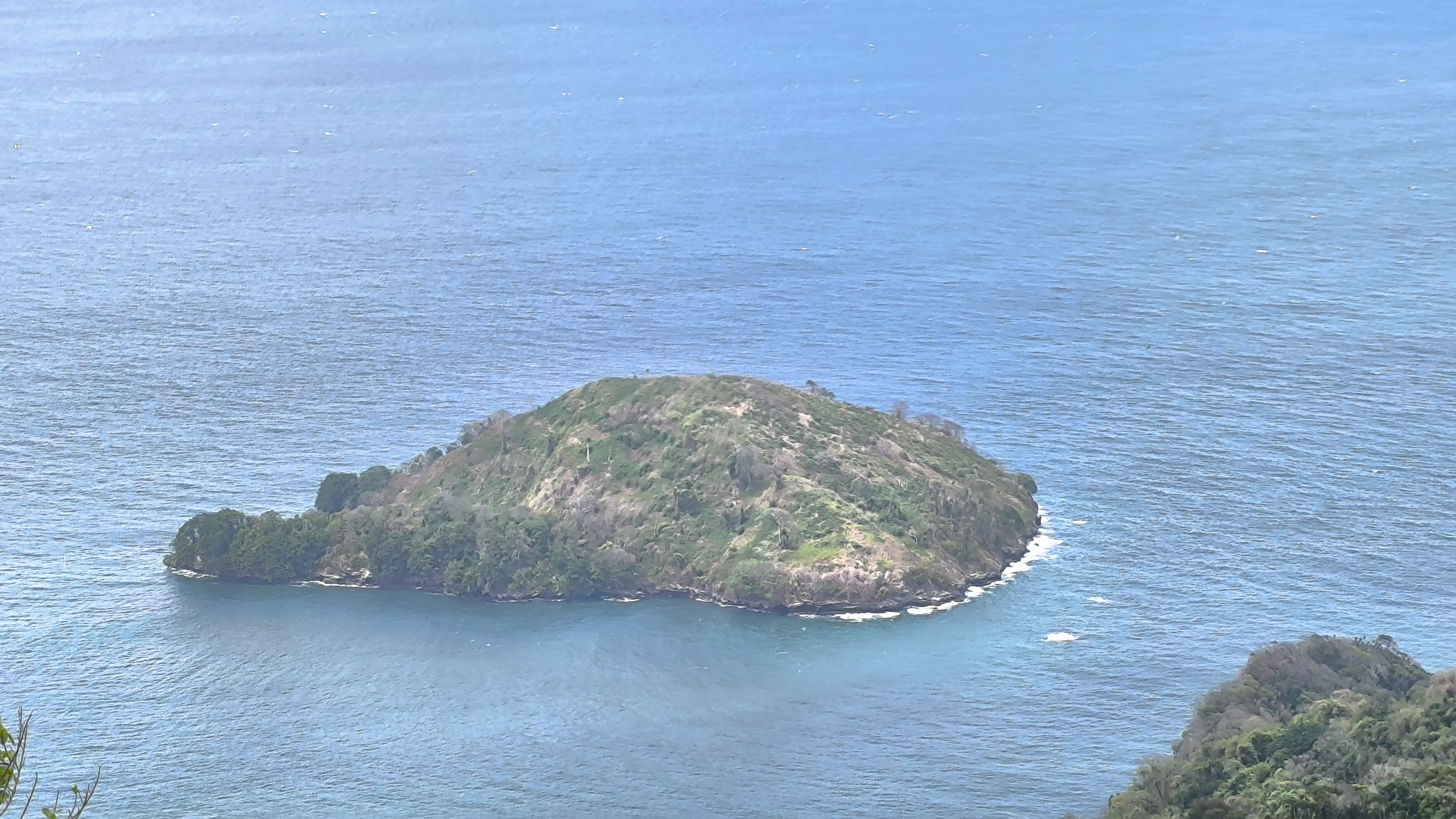
- Picture of Saut d'Eau off the north coast of Trinidad.

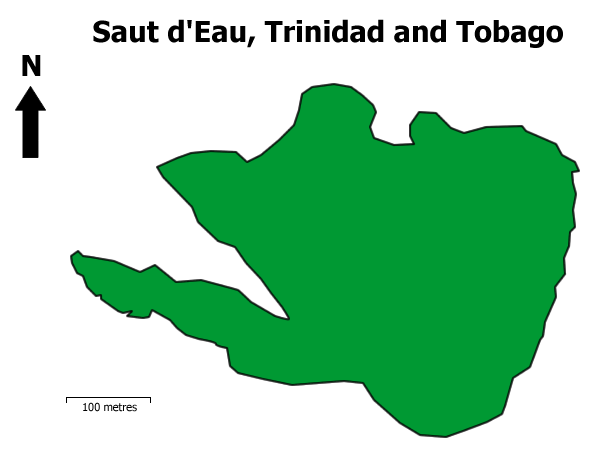
- Map of Saut d'Eau Island

Geography
- Total islands: 1

Administration
- Trinidad and Tobago

Demographics
- Population: Uninhabited (2026)

Saut d'Eau, French for "Waterfall" (literally "water jump" in French), is a small island in the Republic of Trinidad and Tobago. It is located just off the north coast of main island of Trinidad (less than 500 metres) in the Caribbean Sea. It is one of thirteen government protected wildlife sanctuaries, one of two breeding grounds for pelicans in the country.

== Characteristics ==
The island's highest point is 106 metres and its area is approximately 100,000 m^{2}. Its geology comprises several jagged cliffs rising to a high elevation given the island's small size. Its flora comprises deciduous forest, scrub and coarse grass.

== Wildlife sanctuary ==
The island was proclaimed a wildlife sanctuary in 1935 by the Trinidad and Tobago Government, granting it full legal protection by the Ministry of Agriculture, Forestry Division. Its notable wildlife is the Pelecanus occidentalis (brown pelican) which breed on the island, the only breeding place for the species in the country. Other important species on the island include the chestnut-collared swift and rufous-necked wood-rail, both of which are rare in the country. There are estimated to be at least 27 species of birds on the island. Poaching is not a major threat to the island because of its inaccessibility due to its jagged cliffs, rough seas and distance from populated areas. Patrols by game wardens are also infrequent for the same reasons.
