= Saint Giles Island =

Island off the north-east tip of Tobago

Coordinates: 11°21′N 60°31′W

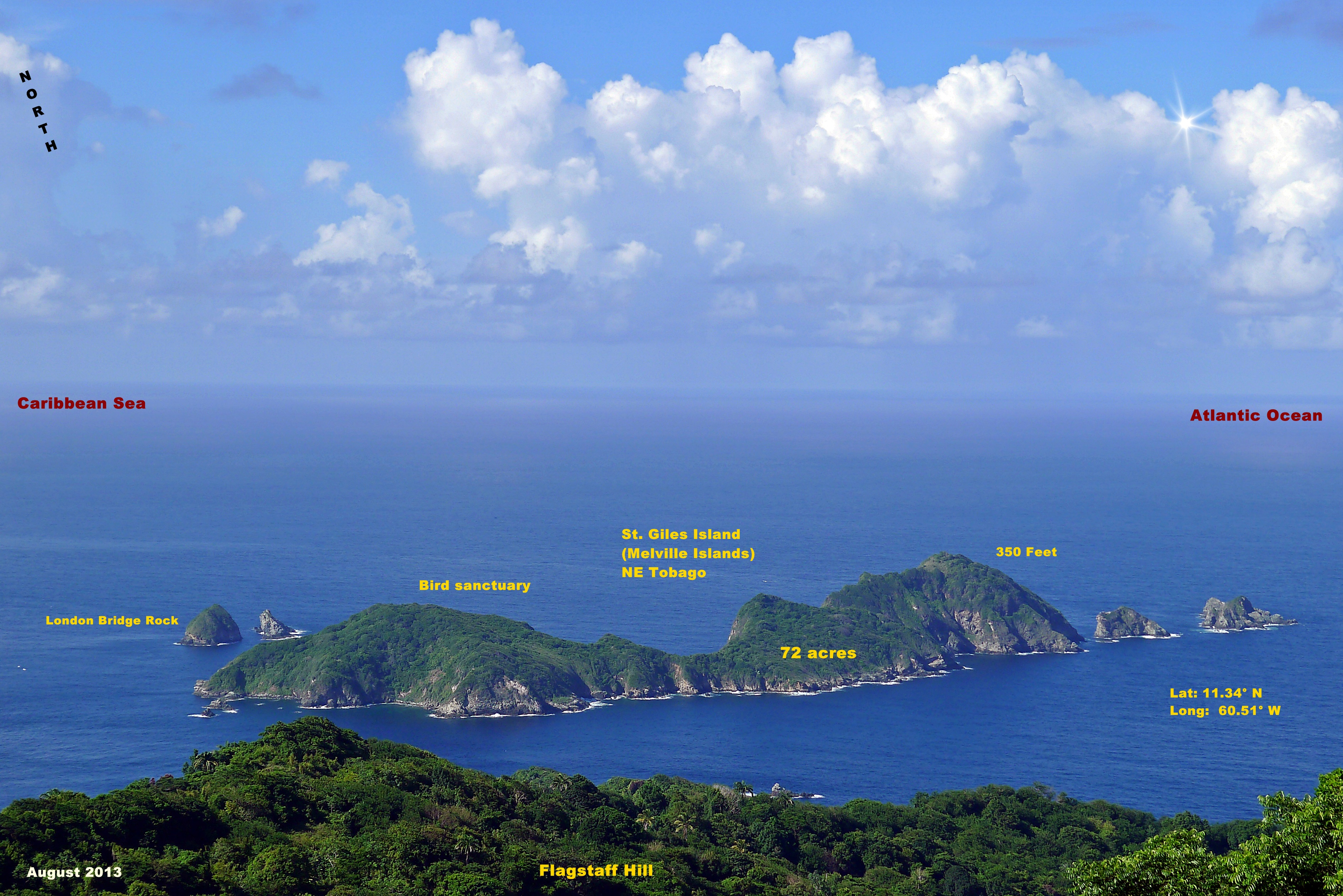
Saint Giles Island

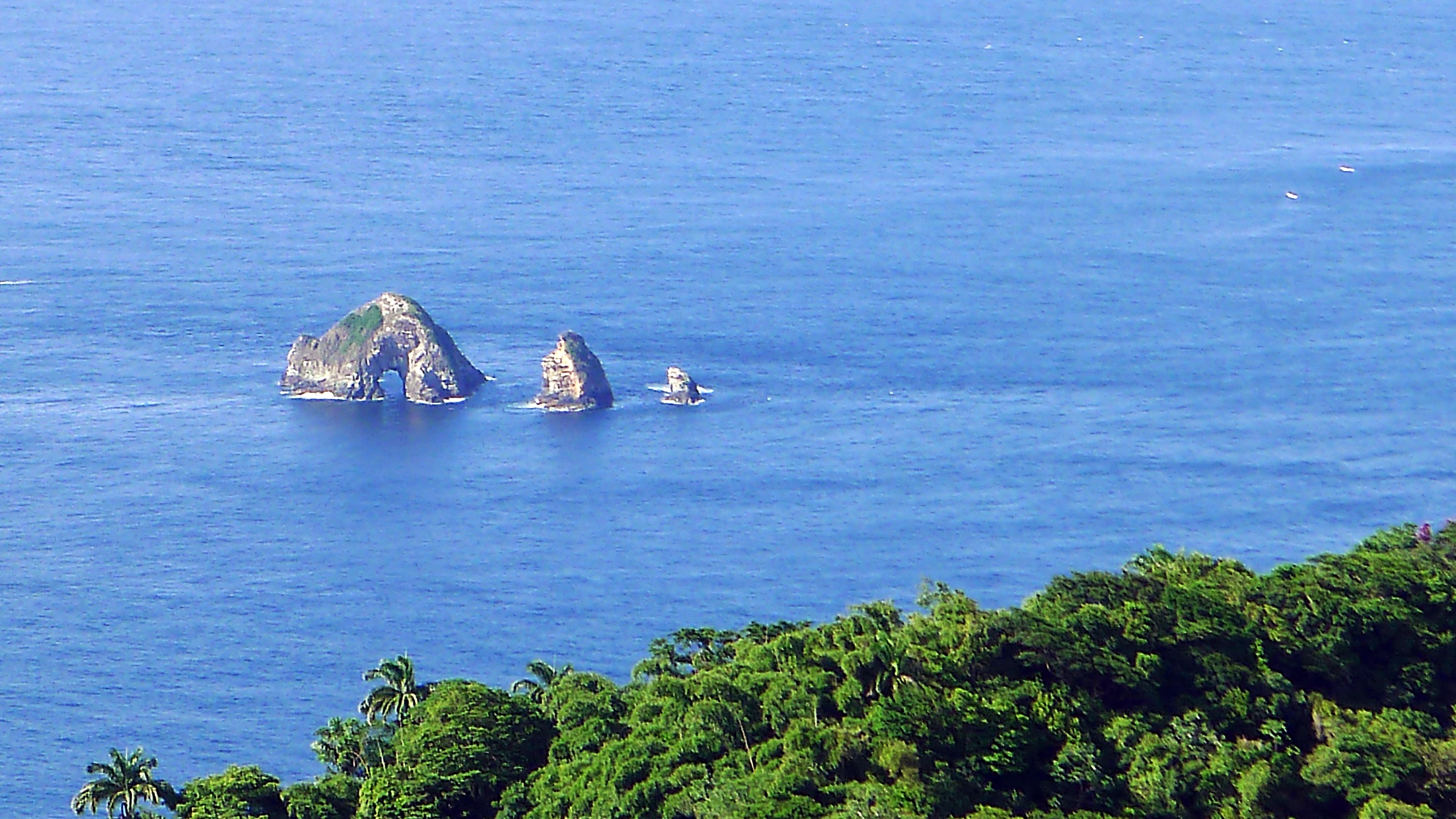
London Bridge Rock, to the west of Saint Giles Island

Saint Giles Island is the largest in a group of small islands off the north-eastern tip of Tobago, in the Caribbean country of Trinidad and Tobago.

== Environment ==
The island is very steep sided and hosts tropical dry forest and wind-swept littoral scrub. At least five species of reptiles have been recorded for the island. One is a snake - Boddaert's tropical racer. The remaining four are lizards - green iguanas, turnip-tailed geckos, eyespot geckos and an unidentified species of skink in the sub-family Mabuyinae.

Saint Giles, along with adjacent rock islets, has been designated an Important Bird Area (IBA) by BirdLife International because it supports significant populations of red-billed tropicbirds, Sargasso Shearwaters and magnificent frigatebirds, as well as red-footed, brown and masked boobies. It is one of the most important seabird breeding islands in the southern Caribbean.

== See also ==
- Islands of Trinidad and Tobago
