= Carrera Island =

Island in the Gulf of Paria, Trinidad and Tobago

Coordinates: 10°40′N 61°37′W

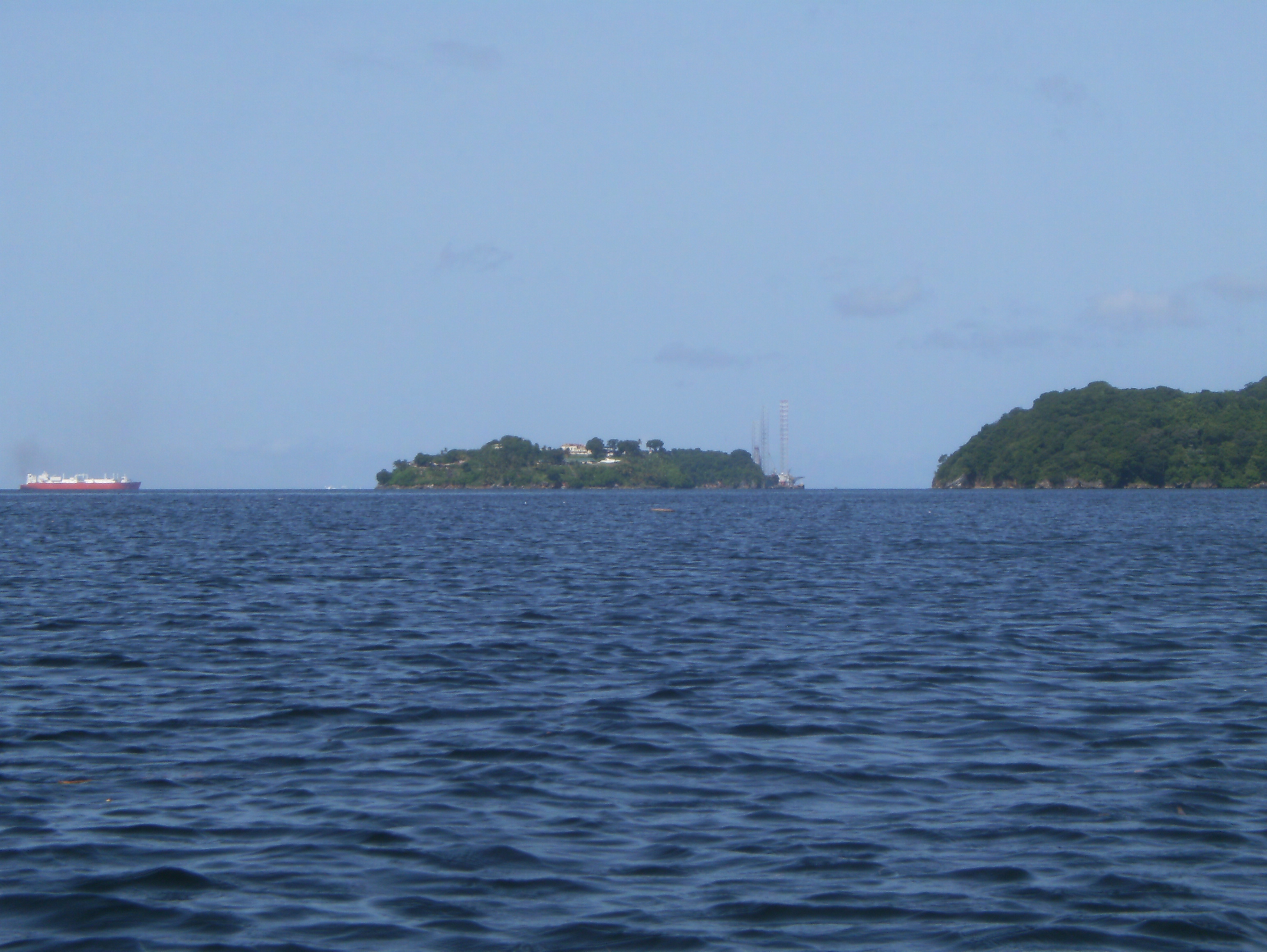
Carrera Island as seen from the East.

Carrera Island is one of the two Diego Islands in the Gulf of Paria, Trinidad and Tobago. Situated off the northwest peninsula of Trinidad, the islet comprises approximately 20 acres (8.1 ha). When Trinidad was under Spanish rule, Carrera Island was known as Isla Carrera.

Since the late 19th century, Carrera has been used as a prison island. The Government of Trinidad and Tobago announced the facility shall be mothballed by the end of 2013, at which time all prisoners currently incarcerated there would be transferred to mainland correctional facilities, however as of late 2019 the island remains a functioning prison.

== See also ==
- Islands of Trinidad and Tobago
