= Military brat (U.S. subculture) =

Child of a member of the U.S. armed forces

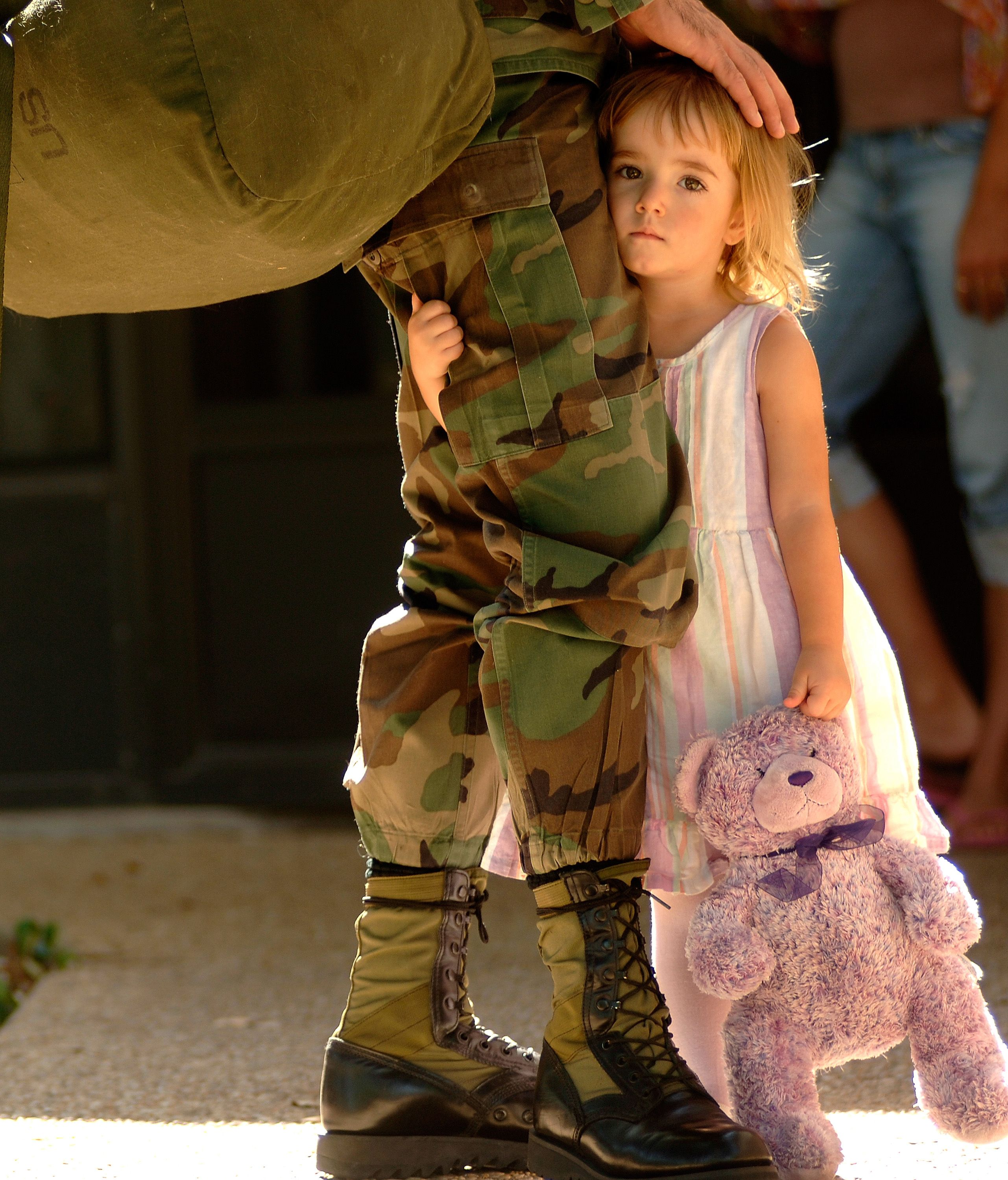
An American child holds on to her father's leg while saying goodbye to him prior to his 2006 deployment to Southwest Asia during the war on terror

In the United States, a military brat (also known by various "brat" derivatives) is the child of a parent or parents serving full-time in the United States Armed Forces, whether current or former. The term military brat can also refer to the subculture and lifestyle of such families.

The military brat lifestyle typically involves moving to new states or countries many times while growing up, as the child's military family is customarily transferred to new non-combat assignments; consequently, many military brats never have a home town. War-related family stresses are also a commonly occurring part of military brat life. There are also other aspects of military brat life that are significantly different in comparison to the civilian American population, often including living in foreign countries and/or diverse regions within the U.S., exposure to foreign languages and cultures, and immersion in military culture.

The military brats subculture has emerged over the last 200 years. The age of the phenomenon has meant military brats have also been described by a number of researchers as one of America's oldest and yet least well-known and largely invisible subcultures. They have also been described as a "modern nomadic subculture".

Military brat is known in U.S. military culture as a term of endearment and respect. The term may also connote a military brat's experience of mobile upbringing, and may refer to a sense of worldliness. Research has shown that many current and former military brats like the term; however, outside of the military world, the term military brat can sometimes be misunderstood by the non-military population, where the word brat is often a pejorative term.

== Primary features of lifestyle and culture ==
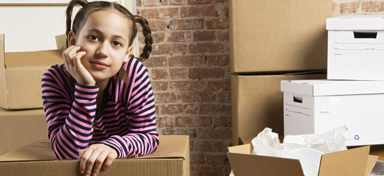
Photo from US Army guide on moving, written for military families. Military brats move an average of 10 times while growing up; some have moved as many as 36 times, often thousands of miles in distance, including spending years overseas.

Studies show that this group is shaped by several forces. A major influence is the fact of frequent moves, as the family follows the military member-parent (or in some cases, both parents who are military members) who is transferred from military base to military base, each move usually being hundreds or thousands of miles in distance. Other shaping forces include a culture of resilience and adaptivity, constant loss of friendship ties, a facility or knack for making new friends, never having a home town, and extensive exposure to foreign cultures and languages while living overseas or to a wide range of regional cultural differences due to living in a variety of different American regions. Additional influences include living in a series of military bases serving as community centers, the pervasive military culture on those bases, the absence of a parent due to deployments, the threat of parental loss in war, stresses associated with the psychological aftermath of war (living with war-affected returning veteran parents) and the militarization of the family unit (children being treated to some degree like soldiers and being subjected to military regimentation, inculcation into a warrior code of honor and service, frequent exposure to patriotic ideas and symbols, experience of free medical care, and military discipline). Military brats receive Tricare until they reach the age of 21, or age 23 if a full-time student (typically college or university), or age 25 if Tricare Young Adult is purchased.

While some non-military families may share some of these same attributes and experiences, military culture has a much higher incidence and concentration of these issues and experiences in military families as compared to civilian populations, and by tightly-knit military communities that perceive these experiences as normal. Studies show that growing up immersed in military culture can have long-lasting effects on children, in both positive and negative ways.

=== Life on base ===
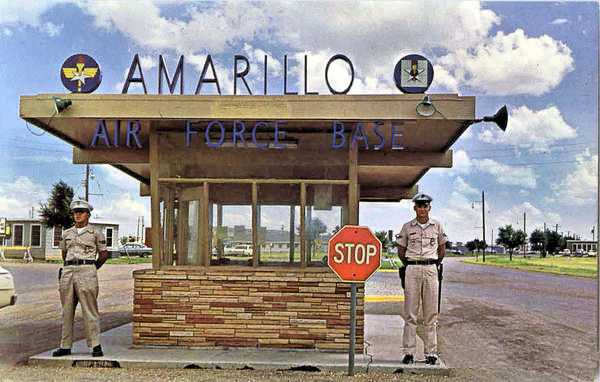
Base gate and checkpoint at the since-closed Amarillo AFB. Life inside of military bases differs significantly from the civilian world, giving many military brats a feeling of difference from civilian culture.

Military bases are often small cities, sometimes with 10,000 or more people, and are self-contained worlds where military culture is primary and civilian culture is secondary. Military families do not always live on base, but often do. Military towns, the areas immediately surrounding a base, are also often highly influenced by military culture. While the general public uses the term base to refer to any military installation, within the US military the term base primarily applies to Air Force or Navy installations while Army installations are called posts or forts and Marine Corps installations are called camps. Both Navy and Marines usually call land based air installations stations.

Military brats grow up, often moving from base to base as they follow their parent or parents to new assignments. Sometimes living on base, sometimes off, the base in both cases is often the center of military brat life, where shopping, recreation, schools and the military community form a string of temporary towns for military brats as they grow up.

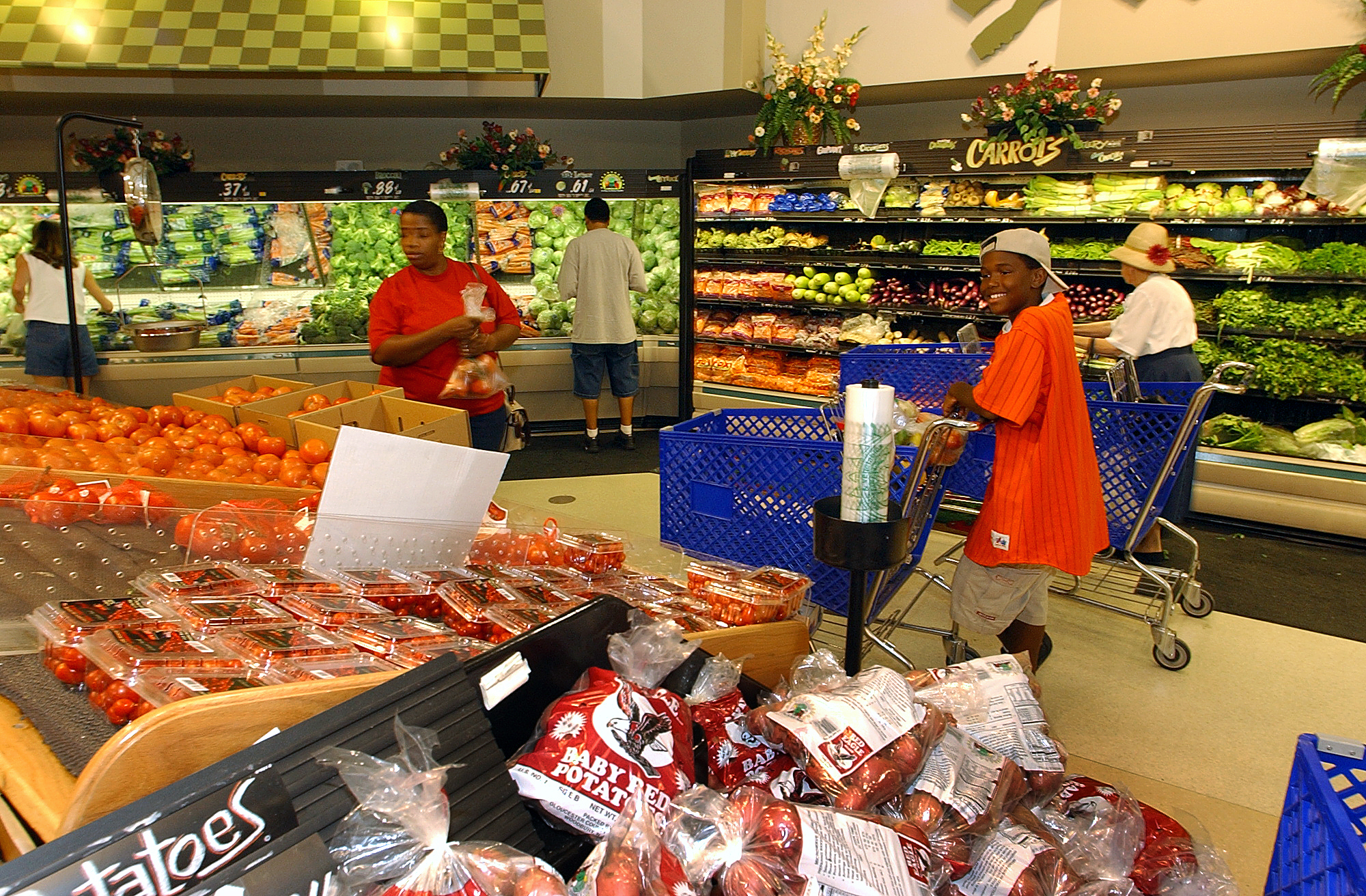
Two military brats shopping at the commissary, located on the military base. Bases are often self-contained towns, with shopping, schools, hospitals, recreation centers, movie theaters, etc.

Studies show that the culture on military bases is perceived by most current and former military brats as different from civilian culture. It is widely experienced as being pervaded by military cultural norms and expectations, as well as the presence of military police or their other military security forces equivalents, armed guards, high security zones and some degree of surveillance. Some bases also contain unique features, such as air bases with numerous aircraft and attendant noise, or seaports with large numbers of naval vessels, or tanks and artillery live firing on army posts. Balancing this are extensive areas which are more relaxed in character, for on-base housing, shopping, dining, recreation, sports and entertainment, as well as base chapels which host diverse religious services. However, military regulations, laws and social codes of conduct are in force throughout the base, which can be very different from local, state or national laws, regulations and customs.

Military language also has differences from standard American English and is often peppered with military slang and military acronyms. There are many words and phrases that are unique to the military world and which make up a part of everyday conversation on bases. For example, time is measured in 24-hour rather than 12-hour segments as in the civilian world, and distances, primarily on stateside Army posts or on many U.S. bases of all services overseas, often described in meters and kilometers (or clicks in military slang) instead of yards or miles. Consequently, many military brats report feelings of cultural identity that have a military flavor and a feeling of difference from local civilian culture, even on bases in the United States. These feelings of difference can also be made more complex by virtue of having absorbed varying degrees of overseas cultures and also different regional American cultures while living in different places as a part of the military brat lifestyle.

Bases do form communities, but due to most of them experiencing frequent 100% turnover in just a few years, an adult military brat can never return and find old friends, neighbors or even former teachers, on bases where they grew up. Base schools usually have an even higher turnover rate, reaching 100% turnover in as little as two years. Due to revocation of base privileges upon reaching the age of 21 (or 23 if one attends college), access to bases to reminisce or reconnect with one's places of growing up can also be difficult.

=== Size of population ===
Although no exact figures are available, the U.S. Department of Defense estimates that approximately 15 million Americans are former or current military brats, including those who spent all or part of their childhood and/or adolescence in the lifestyle. This population includes an age range from less than 1 years old to over 90 years of age, since there have been military brats for generations. Many military brats spent all of their growing up years in the active lifestyle, some for only part, although military family issues, dynamics and influences may continue nevertheless. Also, not all military brats grow up moving all the time, although many do.

== Studies ==
Military brats have been studied extensively, both from the perspective of social psychology and as a distinct and unique American subculture, although less so in terms of long-term impact of the lifestyle. There are also some gaps in studies of more recent (post-Cold War-era) military brats.

=== Positive patterns in overall study results ===
Some strong positives that have been identified in studies of military brat populations are a high occurrence of very resilient personalities, exceptional social skills, a high level of multicultural or international awareness, proficiency in foreign languages, and a statistically very strong affinity for careers that entail service to others. Studies show that ex-military kids end up pursuing service-related careers in very high numbers: military service, teaching, counseling, police, nursing and foreign service work being highly represented in military brat career statistics (in comparison to statistics on non-military brat patterns of employment choices). Mary Edwards Wertsch also identified a pattern (for those military brats who do not choose military service) of work that is more independent (self-employment / avoidance of direct subservience to authority figures) and along those lines also favoring creative and artistic professions that offer more independence. She also reported that for those military brats who did choose military service there was a tendency to go through a phase of bucking or testing authority during military service, or a pattern of resenting authority, represented in her study population. However, military brats who become soldiers, sailors, Marines, airmen, Space Force guardians, or coast guardsmen also tend to do well overall in the profession.

As adults, military brats can share many of the same positive and negative traits identified in other populations that experienced very mobile childhoods. Having had the opportunity to live around the world, military brats can have a breadth of experiences unmatched by most teenagers. Regardless of race, religion, nationality, or gender, brats might identify more with other highly mobile children than with non-mobile ones. Military brats also graduate from college at a higher rate than the civilian population and divorce at a lower rate.

=== Negative patterns in overall study results ===
On the negative side, studies show that some former military brats struggle to develop and maintain deep, lasting relationships, and can feel like outsiders to U.S. civilian culture. The transitory lifestyle can hinder potential for constructing concrete relationships with people and developing emotional attachments to specific places, as can the stresses of having a parent deployed to a war zone and also the psychological aftermath of war in dealing with returning veteran parents. In some cases there is also the loss of a parent in combat or peacetime mishap, or a drastic change in a parent due to a combat related disability. A military brat may personally know another child or teenager, or even a few other peers, whose parents have become war casualties (wounded or killed). A significant minority of ex-military brats may exhibit symptoms of post-traumatic stress disorder, avoidant personality disorder, separation anxiety disorder, etc.

== Specific study areas ==
=== Mobile lifestyle preferences ===
Although neither a clearly negative or positive trait, studies also show that many adult military brats report difficulty settling down in one geographic location and also report a desire to move (relocate) every few years; many adult military brats call this "the itch". However, some adult military brats report the opposite tendency and relate refusing any and all pressures from spouses or employers to ever move again.

=== Perfectionist tendencies ===
Many former military brats report struggling at some point in their lives with issues related to perfectionism and learning how to let go in areas of personal performance (perhaps due to the demanding nature of military culture). Paradoxically, a majority of those very same military brats who report having struggled with perfectionism and performance control issues also describe themselves as being successful in their lives, indicating a resilience that also surfaces in overcoming or learning to manage those issues in the long run.

=== Adaptability and outsider feelings ===
Overall a majority of military brats report having developed a kind of extra-adaptability and assimilate into new situations quickly and well, as they have done with each move to a new military base, town or country. Yet paradoxically, long-term feelings of being an outsider in relation to civilian (non-military) culture are common to a majority of military brats.

== Military culture ==
A significant percentage of military brats report difficulty in forming strong relations with people or places, but very often do form strong connections with (or in some cases aversion to) the notion of a military base and the communities in which they find themselves. This is because the knowledge, experience, values, ideas, attitudes, skills, tastes, and techniques that are associated with the military can sometimes differ from civilian culture. Military bases are miniature, self-contained, government-subsidized towns that promote conformity. Military families shop at some of the same stores, whose discounted merchandise is regulated to prevent unfair competition, so they can often end up with the same clothes and products. Male brats were, at one time, likely to get the same "military haircut" at the base barbershop, but this has changed over time. To a child growing up on a military base, in a homogeneous culture, the individuality of civilian life was once thought to be completely foreign. However, as the individual children have attended civilian schools near base and socialized with their peers, this perceived difference may have reduced to varying degrees.

=== Values and patriotism ===
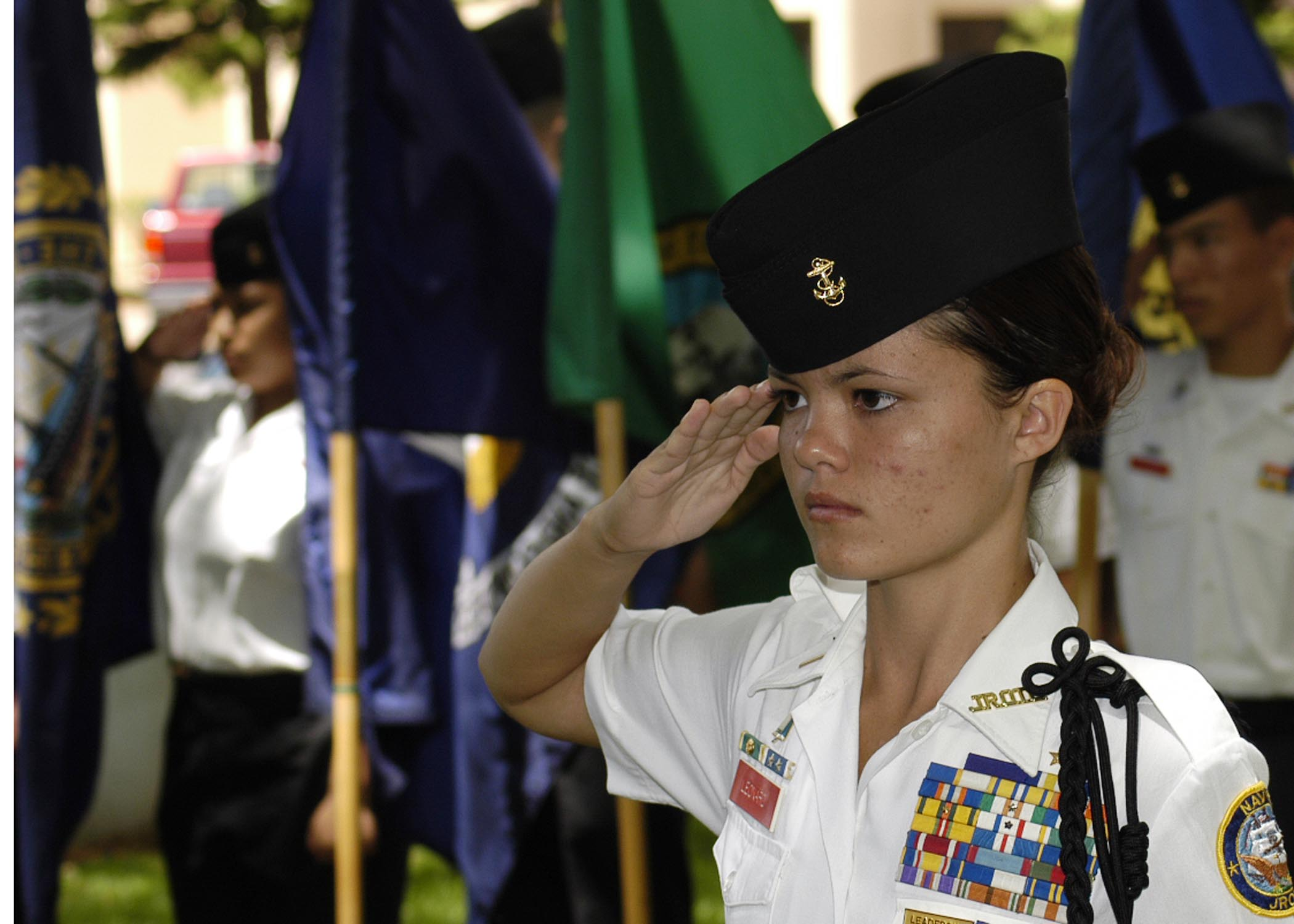
Radford High School JROTC student salutes during colors ceremony. The public school is located one mile from Joint Base Pearl Harbor–Hickam. 62% of its students are military dependents, also called "military brats", resulting in a yearly transiency rate of about one third.

Patriotism may come to mean different things for different ex-military brats, but nevertheless figures strongly in the upbringing, language and thinking of many who grew up in military families. The comfort, or sense of restriction, (or both) that can be found on military bases is not limited to the physical trappings, but can be fortified via some of the consistent rituals common to them. When moving around the world, these rituals can help brats feel at home in their new community. Even though the faces and geography change, the "base" can remain recognizable because the rituals are often uniform. The underlying principle of these rituals is consistent: to promote patriotism.

It has been claimed by Samuel Britten on the basis of anecdotal evidence that life on military bases is associated with comparatively greater patriotic sentiments. For example, honoring the American flag is expected. At the beginning of the business day, on a military installation, the bugle call "To the Colors" is played while the flag is raised. While no longer universal (e.g., personnel performing time critical tasks or duties like marshaling or taxiing aircraft would be exempt), anybody outside, even if participating in sports or driving a car, it is expected to stop their activity and stand at attention. Uniformed personnel salute and non-uniformed people place their hand over their heart.

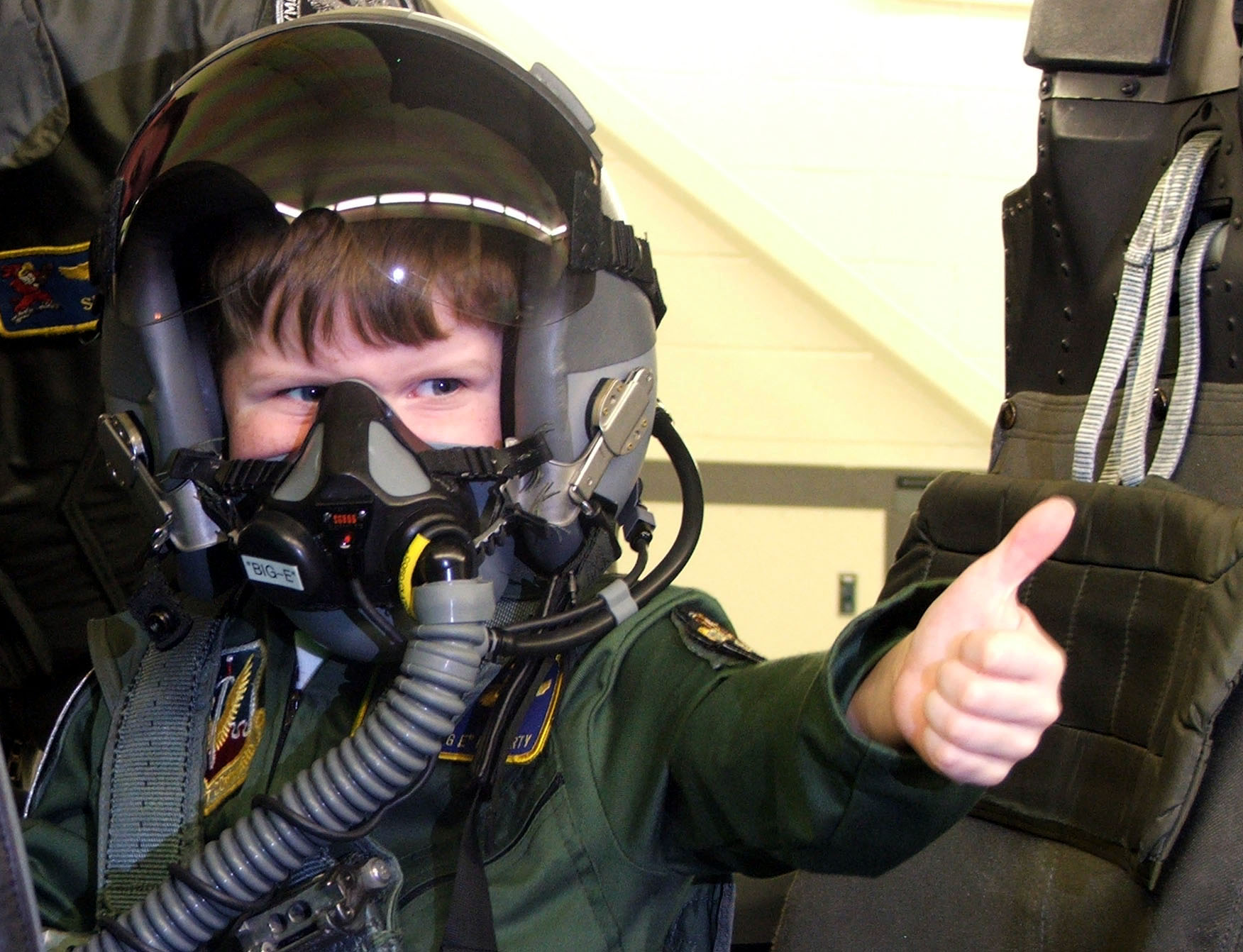
Young military brat gives thumbs up while wearing a pilot's helmet at a base special event.

During and prior to the early 1990s, the Pledge of Allegiance was recited every morning, and patriotic and militaristic songs may have been sung at Department of Defense Dependents Schools (DoDDS) overseas and Department of Defense Domestic Dependent Elementary and Secondary Schools (DDESS) within the United States. Patriotic ideals often form the basis for church sermons. Protestant and Catholic worship services may include militaristic hymns. Prior to movies at base theaters, patrons and staff stand for the National Anthem and often another patriotic song, such as "God Bless the USA".

As of 2023, policy for schools in the Americas run by the Department of Defense Education Activity states that: "The Pledge of Allegiance or National Anthem will be incorporated into the morning announcements. Participation is not mandatory, but all students are expected to show respect."

It is known inside a military family that the sponsor may be killed in the line of duty, but may accept that risk because they understand the values of duty, honor, and country. The mission is one in which the brat shares by extension through his military parent.

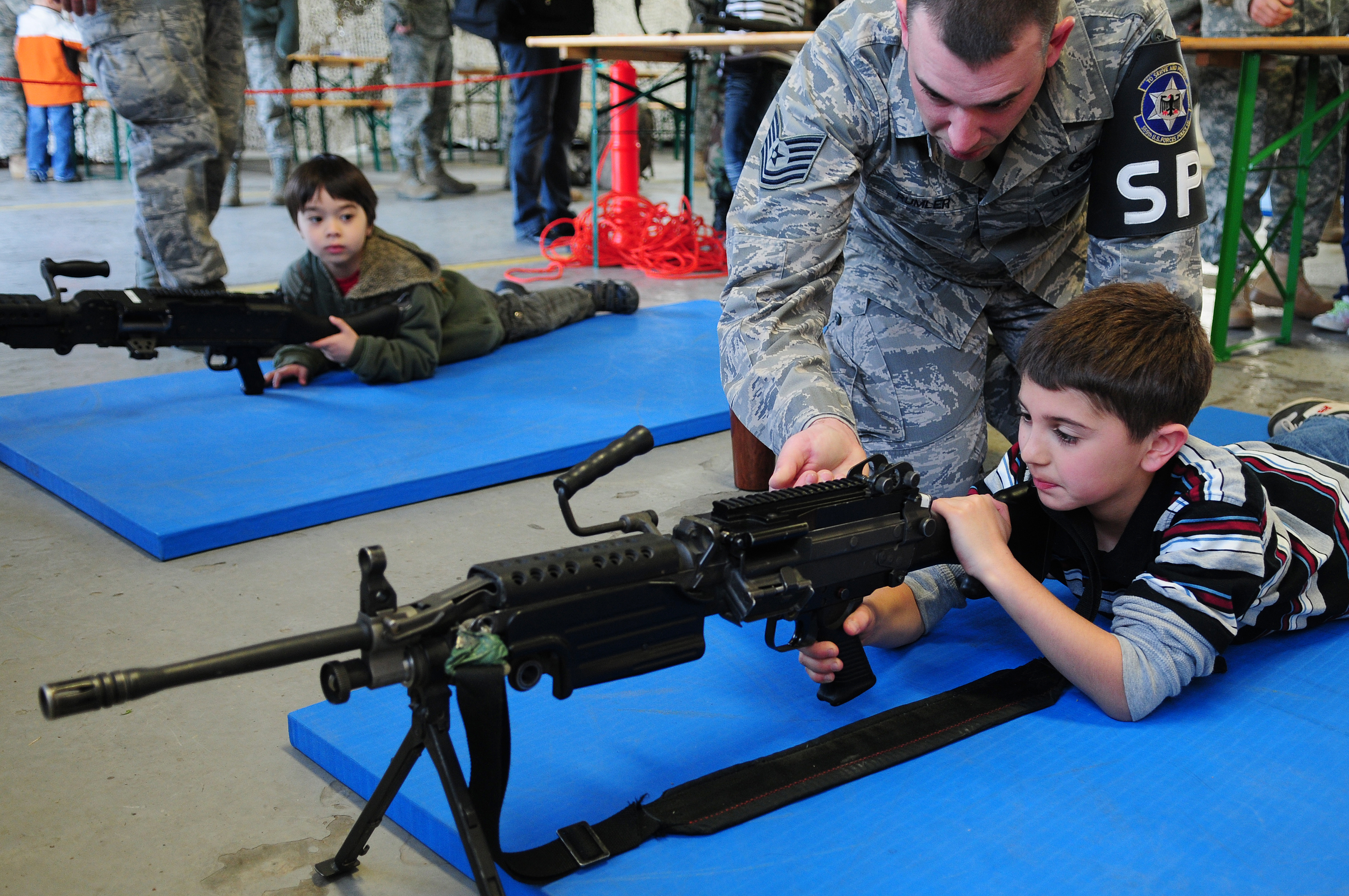
Job Shadow Day at U.S. military base in Germany – military son with father.

Military law requires commanding officers and those in authority to demonstrate virtue, honor, patriotism, and subordination in all that they do. In the 1990s, the army officially adopted what have come to be known as "The 7 Army Values", which are summarized with the acronym "LDRSHIP". LDRSHIP stands for Loyalty, Duty, Respect, Selfless Service, Honor, Integrity, and Personal Courage. While this acronym is relatively new, the ideas it represents have been at the heart of military service for generations. Similarly, the motto "Duty, honor, country" is the standard of the U.S. military. Military brats are raised in a culture that stresses LDRSHIP, Duty, Honor, and Country. Their strict (outward) adherence to military values is what separates most from their civilian peers. Children of military personnel often mirror the values, ideals, and attitudes of their parents more than children of civilians. Marine General Peter Pace, the Chairman of the Joint Chiefs of Staff, said in a 2006 interview, "There's no way, in my mind, that you can be successful in the military and have a family unless that family does, in fact, appreciate your service to the country." Pace also wrote in an April 2006 letter honoring the Month of the Military Child: "You [military children] are American patriots and role models for us all."

=== Discipline ===
The stereotypical military family might have had a "duty roster" on the refrigerator, parent-conducted room inspections, and children who say "yes sir/ma'am" to adults. Eighty percent of Cold War-era brats described their father as "authoritarian" or desiring to exercise complete control over their lives. They described their military parent as rigid in discipline, inflexible, intolerant of dissent, disapproving of non-conforming behavior, insensitive to their emotions, and not accepting of personal privacy. A Cold War era military psychologist, publishing in the American Journal of Psychology, reviewed the parents of patients who came to his clinic, and concluded that 93% of patients came from military families that were overly authoritarian.

Disciplinary expectations extend beyond the military family. Family members know that their actions and behavior can have a direct impact on the military service member's career. The consequences of misbehavior for a military brat are generally greater than for civilian children. A military person's career and social identity can be dashed in seconds by a willful or careless child. For example, when a military brat gets in trouble, the authorities may call the parent's commanding officer or the base commander before, or instead of, calling the brat's parents. If the commanding officer or base commander is contacted, the brat's behavior may become a part of the military member's record, and adversely affect his or her ability to be promoted or the duty assignments (particularly overseas) that lead to advancement.

Research into military brats has consistently shown them to be better behaved than their civilian counterparts. Sociologist Phoebe Price posed three possible hypotheses as to why brats are better behaved: firstly, military parents have a lower threshold for misbehavior in their children; secondly, the mobility of teenagers might make them less likely to attract attention to themselves, as many want to fit in and are less secure with their surroundings; and thirdly, normative constraints are greater, with brats knowing that their behavior is under scrutiny and can affect the military member's career.

Teenage years are typically a period when people establish independence by taking some risks away from their parents. When the teenager lives in a "fish-bowl community," a small self-contained community such as a base, challenging boundaries may be more difficult. Brats know that misbehavior or rebellious activity will be reported to their parents. Brats are sometimes under constant pressure to conform to what military culture expects; this means they are sometimes seen as being more mature in their youth than their peers. If they grow up overseas or on military bases, they might have limited opportunities to see a wide range of role models in different professions.

Strict discipline can have the opposite effect: brats may rebel or behave in adolescent manners well beyond what is normally considered acceptable. Others develop psychological problems due to the intense stress of always being on their best behavior.

=== Military service ===
In adulthood, military brats may themselves join the military, by influence of their upbringing and, sometimes, by encouragement of their military parents. According to Shannon Collins of the Army News Service, statistics show that military children are twice as likely to join the military. Moreover, according to Mark Thompson from Time Magazine, in 2016, Pentagon data showed "that 80% of recent troops come from a family where at least one parent, grandparent, aunt or uncle, sibling or cousin has also worn their nation’s uniform", while "more than 25% have a parent who has served", concluding that the US military has become a "family business" since the end of the US military draft in 1973. Thompson also mentions that military service is a tradition for many military families, which has been part of US history for a long time.

=== Military classism ===
Military life is strictly segregated by rank; the facilities provided for officers and enlisted personnel differ dramatically. The officers' housing will generally be more accessible to base activities, larger in size, and better landscaped. On larger bases, the officers' housing may be broken down into different categories, with senior officers receiving larger and more opulent housing; sometimes, the highest-ranking officers live in a row of large houses often referred to as "Colonels'/Captains' Row" or "Generals'/Admirals' Row," as the case may be.

The Officer Clubs are more elegant than the Enlisted Clubs. Officers have cleaner, more elaborate recreational facilities than their enlisted counterparts. Historically, base chapels and movie theaters would have designated seating for officers and their families. For a part of the 20th century, some bases had two Boy Scout and two Girl Scout troops—one for officer children and one for enlisted children.

These differences are not merely external, but a core aspect of military life. Children of enlisted personnel often believe that children of officers receive specialized treatment because non-officers are afraid to upset the officers. The physical separation and differences between available activities make it very difficult. Most military brats on a personal level do not let this affect their social interactions, and in most cases it is frowned upon to treat others by their parent's pay grade or rank.

The separation by rank has the intended purpose of maintaining military discipline among service members. According to the U.S. Uniform Code of Military Justice, it can be illegal for an officer to fraternize with an enlisted person because it would erode the military hierarchy. This is often conveyed to the children of military personnel. Two brats whose parents have a subordinate-supervisory relationship can cause problems for both their parents.

To a lesser degree, military classism also includes the branch of service to which the military parent belongs. If asked to name "the best branch of service," military brats will almost invariably name the one to which their parent belonged. They will be able to articulate many reasons why "their" branch of the service is the best. These biases are maintained well past the time they cease to be military dependents. When brats grow up, these boundaries are replaced by a shared identity based upon that of being a military brat.

While a class hierarchy is reflected in stratified housing structures, military classism differs from traditional class structures in some significant ways – namely, schooling and access to quality healthcare. Children of military personnel attend the same base schools regardless of rank, creating peer cultures that are usually not class-based, and providing equal access to educational resources. Similarly, all military personnel receive the same quality of healthcare by the same providers.

=== Anti-racism ===
In 1948, nearly 20 years before the civil rights movement swept through the non-military segments of U.S. society, President Truman signed Executive Order 9981 integrating the military and mandating equality of treatment and opportunity. It outlawed segregation in the military and made it illegal, per military law, to make a racist remark. Fifteen years later, Secretary of Defense Robert McNamara issued Department of Defense Directive 5120.36. "Every military commander," the Directive mandates, "has the responsibility to oppose discriminatory practices affecting his men and their dependents and to foster equal opportunity for them, not only in areas under his immediate control, but also in nearby communities where they may gather in off-duty hours." The directive was issued in 1963, but it was not until 1967 that the first non-military installation was declared off-limits to military personnel due to its discriminatory practices. While these directives did not eliminate all racism in the military, they continue to affect the culture in which children of military personnel grow up.

When families go overseas, minority students rarely experience overt racism from their expatriate neighbors. This is also true on military bases within the U.S.; as the diverse and more integrated military base community is isolated from the off-base community, and seen as the primary community, outside communities being secondary, military dependents are less likely to resort to racist notions. The bonds of the military community are normally seen by military dependents as being stronger bonds than the differences of race.

== Growing up military ==
=== Effect of mobile lifestyle on friendships ===
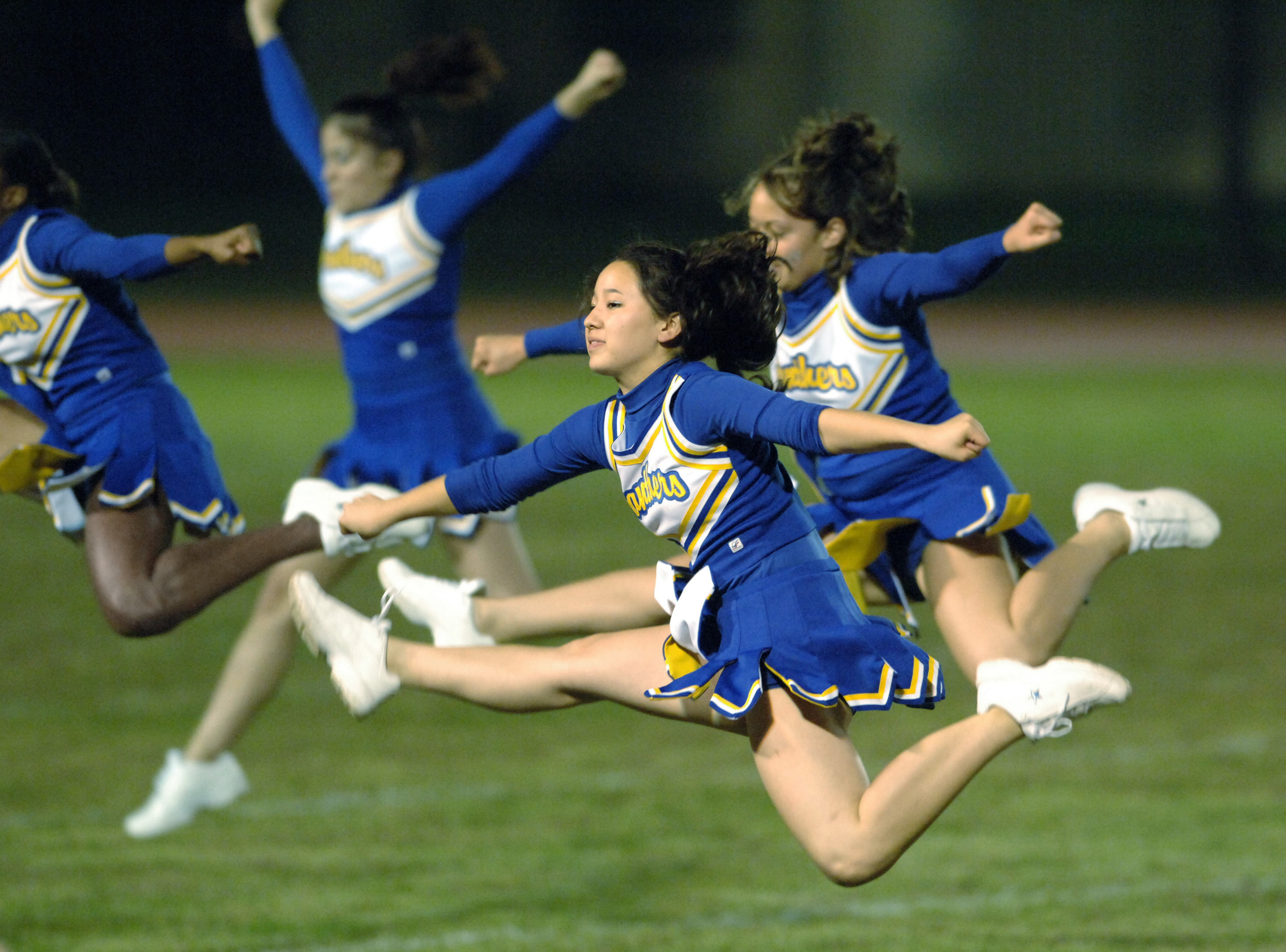
American military brat cheerleaders at a game at Yokota High School, a U.S. Department of Defense school on an American Air Force base in Yokota, Japan

Because military brats are constantly making new friends to replace the ones that they have lost, they are often more outgoing and independent. On the other hand, the experience of being a constant stranger can lead them to feel estranged everywhere, even if later in life they settle down in one place. According to the largest study conducted on nearly 700 TCKs, eighty percent claim that they can relate to anyone, regardless of differences such as race, ethnicity, religion, or nationality.

A typical military school can experience up to 50% turnover every year (25% graduate while a third of the remaining 75% of students move); social groups that existed one year cease to exist as new groups emerge. Military children learn to adapt quickly to fit into this changing environment. Highly mobile children are more likely to reach out to a new student, because they know what it is like to be the new student.

Recent studies show that, although brats move on average every 3 years, they do not grow accustomed to moving. The constantly changing environment and openness to others has a price. Rather than develop problem-solving skills, there is a temptation to simply leave a problem without resolving it. If a person does not like somebody or gets into a fight, they know that in a few years somebody will move and the problem will disappear. On the other hand, when brats marry it is generally for life; over two thirds of brats over 40 are married to their first spouse. Studies show that many brats become very adaptable as a result of the mobile lifestyle, but there is also a higher than average incidence, among a minority of military brats, of avoidant personality disorder and separation anxiety disorder.

=== School life ===
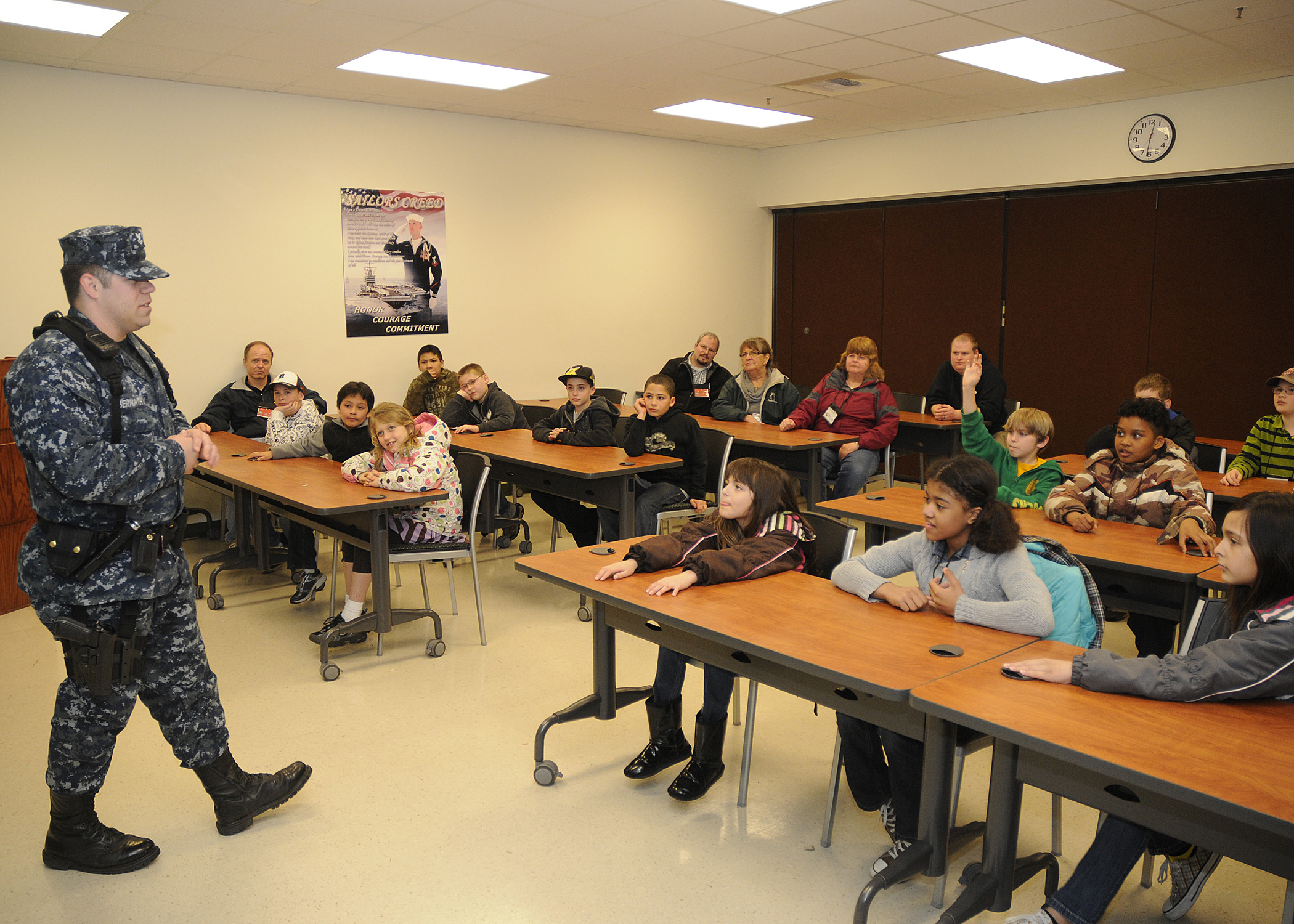
Military brats on a 2011 school field trip to Naval Air Station Whidbey Island

Moving during the summer months can be challenging. Courses students have taken at their old schools may not fulfill the graduation requirements at their new school. Moving during the winter holidays or mid-year, however, has traditionally been viewed as the worst time to move. The student is forced to join classes that have already begun. Social groups become even more difficult to break into, and activities that the student enjoyed may be barred to him or her. For example, an athlete may not be able to join his or her sport because they missed tryouts and the season had already begun. A student who excelled at their old DoDDS or DDESS school suddenly feels inadequate at the larger school. Recent studies, however, show that mobility during the school year may be less traumatic than summertime moves.

DoDDS schools overseas and DDESS schools in the United States tend to be smaller than many public schools. Students and teachers often interact in a more social manner with one another. When returning to civilian schools, the lack of camaraderie with the faculty can be an unexpected obstacle for many highly mobile families.

Military brats have lower delinquency rates, higher achievement scores on standardized tests, and higher median IQs than their civilian counterparts. They are more likely to have a college degree (60% v 24%) and possess an advanced degree (29.1% v 5%). While these rates are higher than the general U.S. population, they are lower than those of other non-brat third culture kids (84–90% college degree and 40% graduate degree). United States military brats are the most mobile of the "third culture kids", moving on average every three years. Brats move frequently between bases in the United States and typically spend at least three years abroad.

=== Range of international experience and influences ===
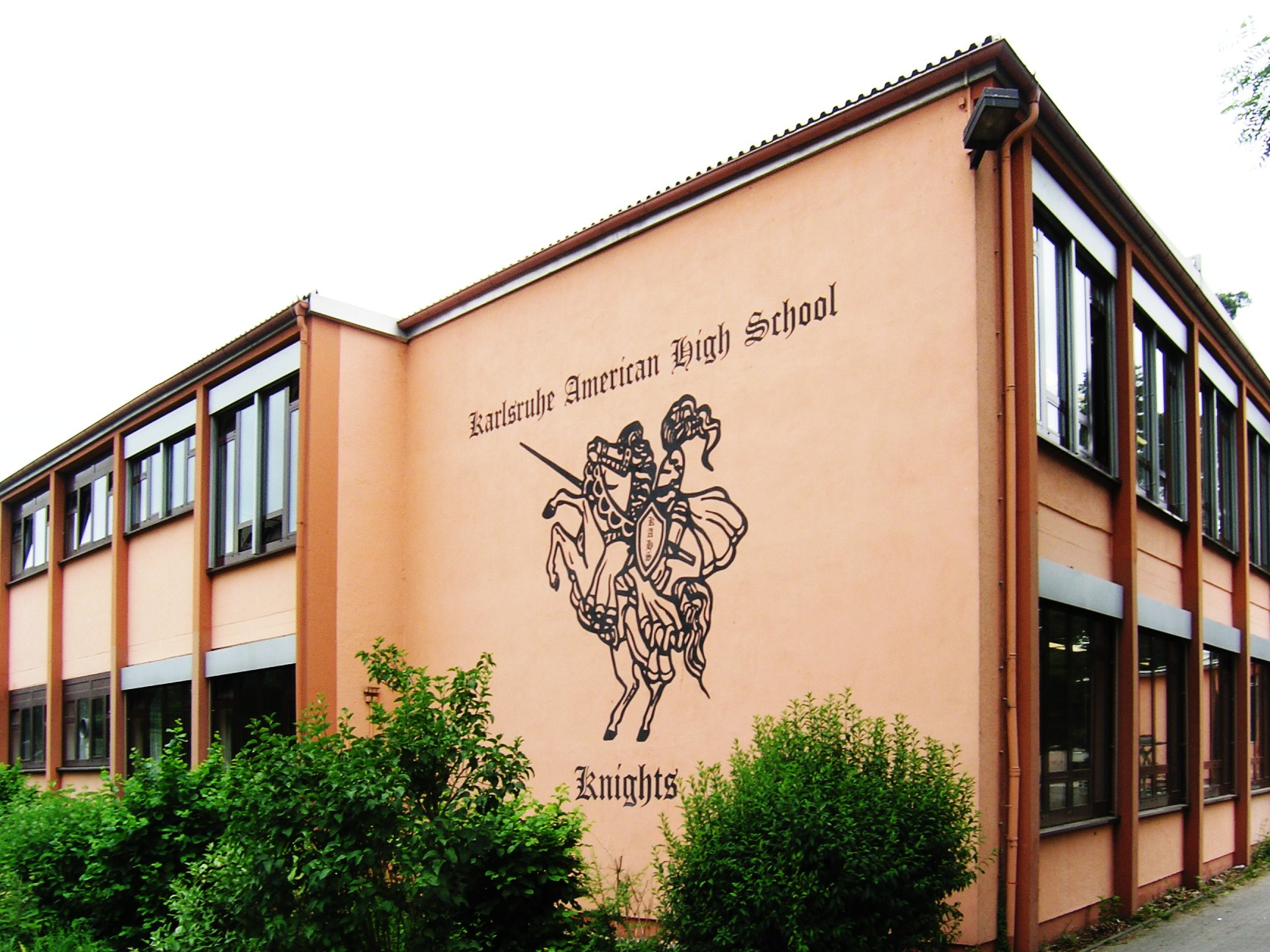
Former Karlsruhe American High School for children of members of the US Army stationed at Karlsruhe, Germany

Sociologist Morten Ender conducted the largest scientific study to date exclusively on career military brats (those who had at least one parent in the military from birth through high school). He interviewed and sent questionnaires to over 600 brats who belonged to various brat organizations and responded to his newspaper and internet ads. His study revealed that 97% lived in at least one foreign country, 63% in two, 31% in three. They averaged eight moves before graduating from high school and spent an average of seven years in foreign countries. Over 80% now speak at least one language other than English, and 14% speak three or more. Ann Cottrell's work with third culture kids, however, shows slightly lower results, but her results did not specify career brats. Sociologist Henry Watanabe showed that military and civilian teenagers share the same concerns and desires, but that growing up in a mobile community offers opportunities and experiences generally unavailable to geographically stable families. A sociological study of overseas American military communities in Cold War Germany also showed some transformational effects on those communities due to foreign exposure.

=== Abuse and alcoholism ===
Two of the common themes in Wertsch's book are abuse and alcoholism. These are echoed in other literature of the Cold War, such as Pat Conroy's The Great Santini. In the 1980s and 1990s the U.S. military focused on the issues of abuse and alcoholism. The impact on the military's efforts remains inconclusive. Some studies report higher rates of abuse in military families, while others report lower rates.

The studies that conclude abuse is a bigger problem in military families than civilian families attribute this to the long hours, frequent disruptions in lifestyles, and high degree of stress. They point out that military families may be more reluctant to report issues of abuse because of the potential impact on the service member's career. Other studies, however, argue that military families have a smaller problem than civilian families because military culture offers more accessible help for victims of abuse. Military families have health care, housing, and family support programs often unavailable to lower income civilian families. Abusive family members are more likely to be ordered (by their commanding officer or base commander) to obtain treatment, thus reducing reoccurrences of abuse.

== Current military brats ==
In 2010, the U.S. Defense Department reported that there were currently 2 million American children and teenagers who have had at least one parent deployed in a war zone in the then-current Iraq and Afghanistan conflicts. Over 900,000 have had a parent deployed multiple times.

Most of the research into military brats has been conducted on the long-term effects on adults who grew up during the Cold War and also during the Vietnam and Korean wars. As the Cold War came to an end, the role of the United States Armed Forces changed. The U.S. military realized that there was distinct correlation between the quality of life and retention and operational effectiveness. To this end, the military started to change the living standards that most Cold War brats grew up with. The demographics of the military changed. The modern military has a larger proportion of married military members. Since base housing is designed for fewer families, more families are forced to live off-base.

Military personnel are now being supplemented by more government civilians and defense contractors filling essential roles, and the introduction of large megabases that intermesh different service branches and their individual cultures has also affected the demographics. Finally, during the post-Cold War period, the United States has been involved in three extended military engagements (two in Iraq and one in Afghanistan). The long-term effects of these changes are unknown, but research has been conducted on short-term effects on post-Cold War-era brats.

=== War in the 21st century ===
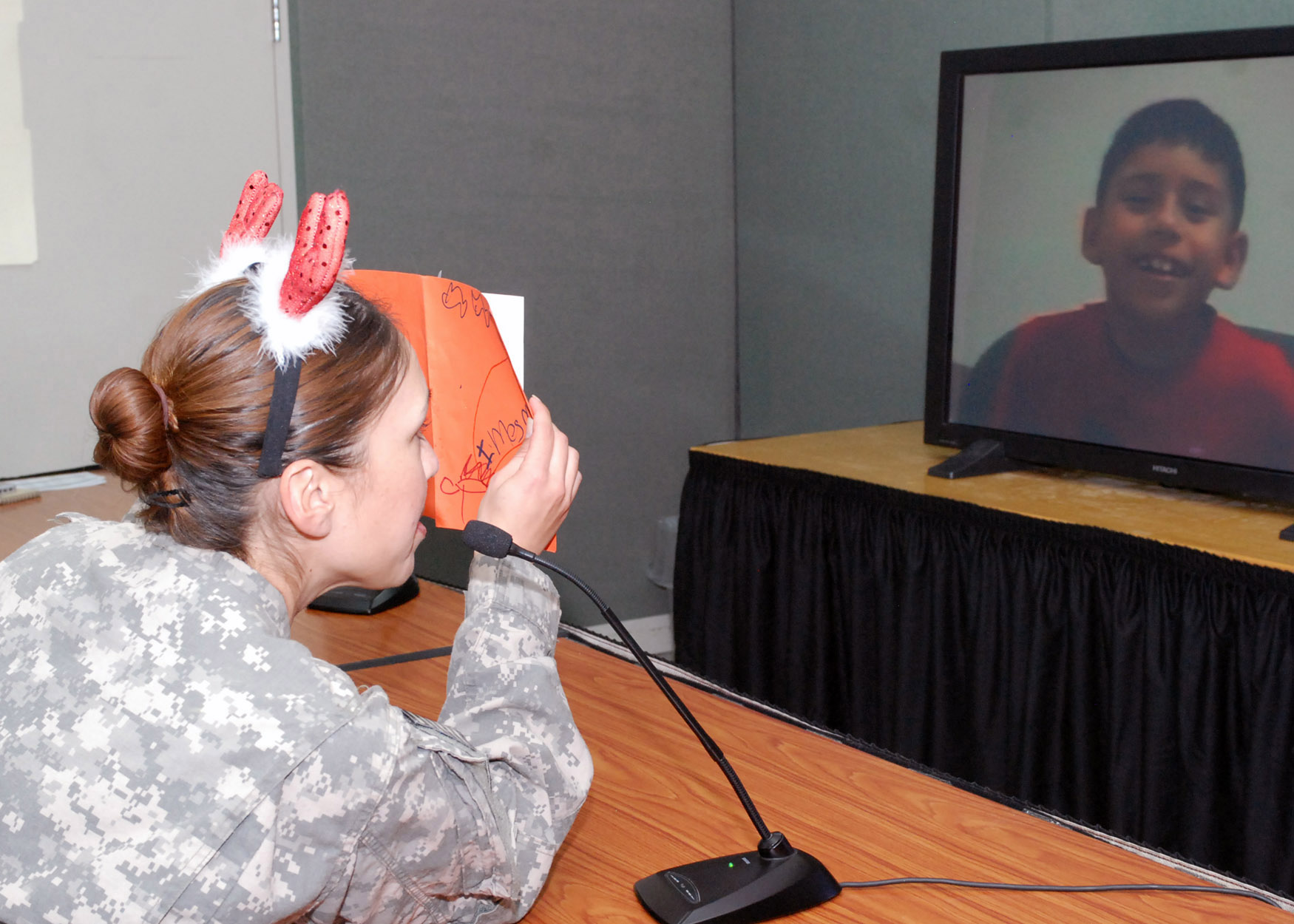
U.S. Army soldier in Iraq talking to her child by teleconference

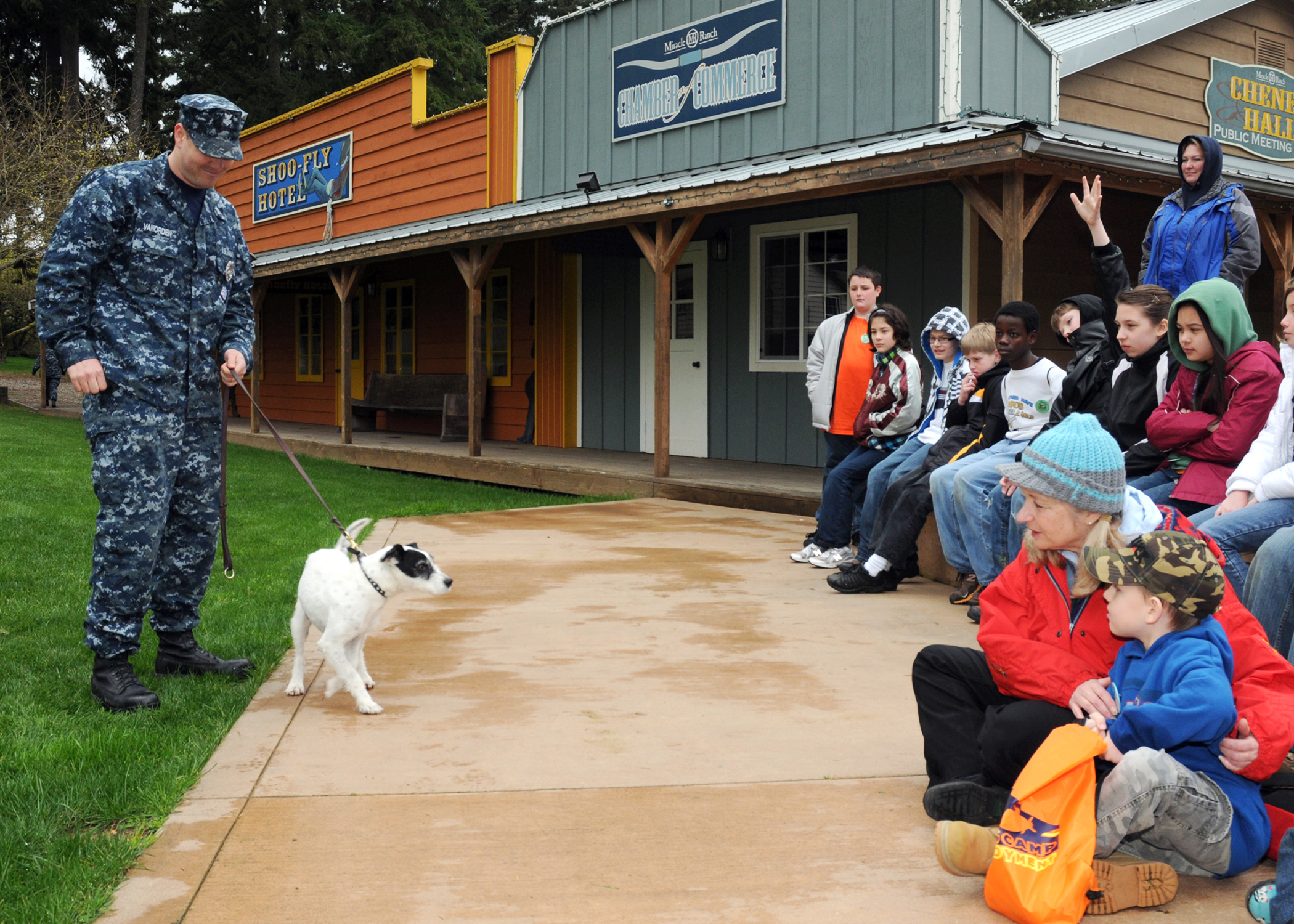
Military brats whose parents are war-deployed attend a special support event and watch a Navy Master-at-Arms military working dog demonstration.

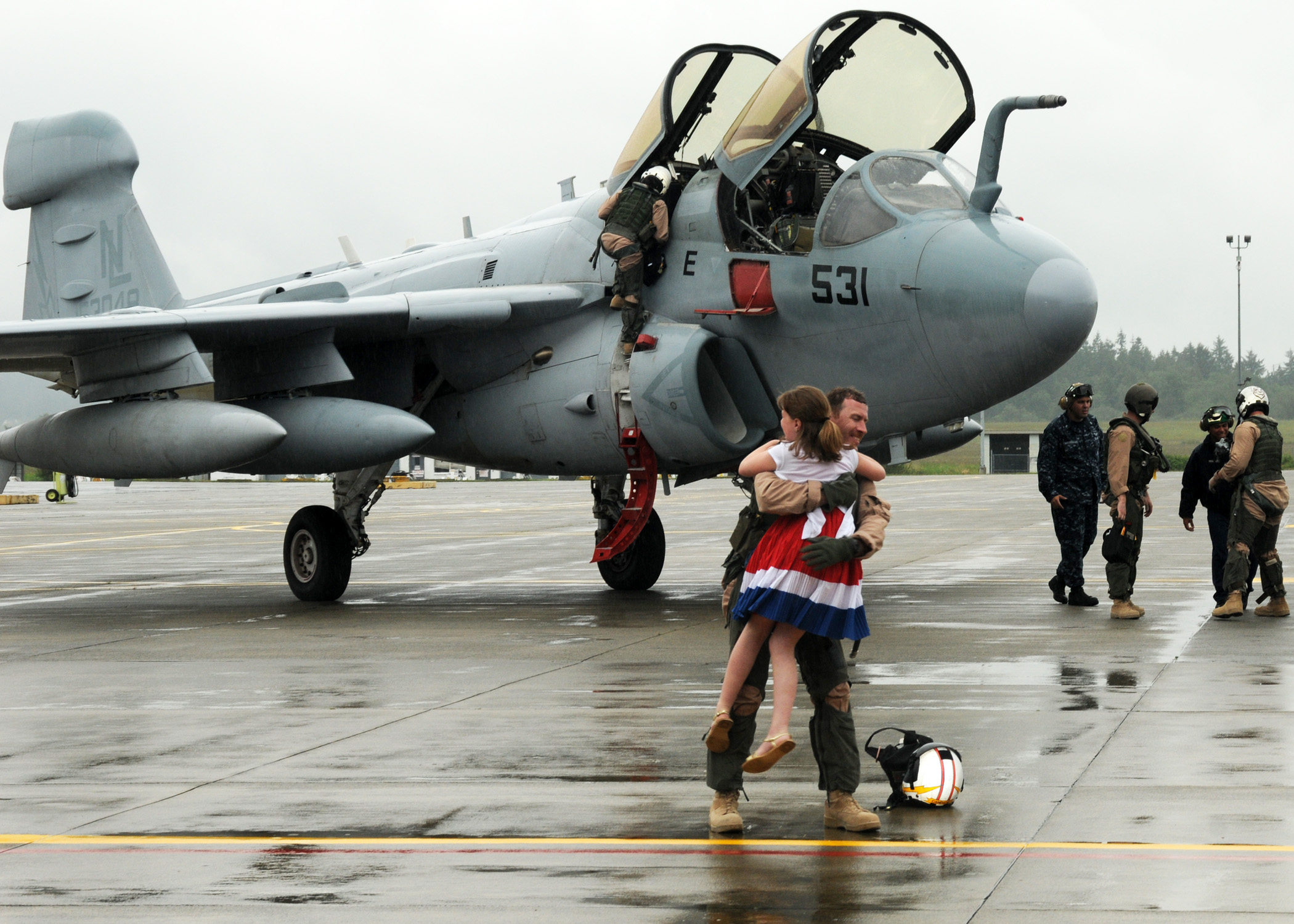
Returning Navy pilot is greeted by his daughter.

Today's military brat faces some additional challenges. For example, it is estimated that approximately 50,000 military families have both parents serving in the armed forces; this creates the possibility that both parents may be deployed at the same time. Another significant difference is the speed of communication. With the advent of the Internet it is possible for family members to communicate with servicemen in combat zones. This allows brats to remain in closer contact with their military parent(s), but it also increases tension as more details reach the military families. Round-the-clock news agencies, such as CNN and Fox News, spread news faster than the military bureaucracy can process the details. This means that military families may know that servicemen have died before official word reaches the family. Military psychiatrist Colonel Stephen Cozza says that a "sense of fear" accompanies news of the death of a service member until confirmation that the service member was not a loved one.

Wertsch has pointed out, however, that during the Vietnam War, televised news war coverage was also very intense and constant, and that similar issues of military family fear being intensified by television coverage were also present for military brats and spouses of that era with a family member in the war.

Despite these facts, studies show only a slight increase in immediate stressors among military brats whose parents serve in a combat zone, although no studies on the longer-term effects have ever been done. Boys and younger children do show the most risk when a parent is deployed, but rarely does this require clinical intervention. However, studies show that when a military member is deployed to a combat zone, the family cohesion is more disrupted than when service members are deployed to non-combat zones.

Military members can be deployed for days, months, or even years without their family. When a parent is stationed without their family, the children experience the same emotions as children of divorced parents. In addition to the effects of the divorce, military brats have additional concerns. When a military member is sent away, the family does not always know where they are going or when (or if) the service member will return. Studies show that there are three phases to deployment, and each phase has different impacts on the family. Military spouses reported the following when their spouse was deployed:

- Predeployment – Marital stress/conflict, distancing from spouse, anger, resentment, sadness/depression, negative child behavior.
- Deployment – Marital problems, isolation, loneliness, anger, resentment, sadness/depression, reduced communications, stress, less social support, assuming the role of single parent, child care difficulties, sleep disturbances, physical symptoms, home and car repairs, difficulty accessing military services, negative child behavior.
- Postdeployment/Reunion – Redefining responsibilities, marital stress, communication problems, anxiety, anger, resentment, parent-child attachment issues

While separation produces stress, according to the US military it strengthens the children by forcing them to take on additional responsibilities when a parent is absent, encouraging independence.

A Pentagon study released in June 2009 reported that children of combat troops show more fear, anxiety and behavioral problems. According to the study, spouses report that when the service member is sent to a combat zone, that their children start to experienced increased anxiety. One in four parents say their children respond poor or very poorly, and a third experienced academic problems. Another study done by the University of California Los Angeles indicated that a year after the parent returns, 30% of children "exhibited clinical levels of anxiety." The Pentagon Study found the effects most pronounced in children between the ages of 5–13, while the UCLA study found contrary evidence that the issues were the strongest in children under the age of 8.

=== "Suddenly military" brats ("Reserve brats" or "National Guard brats") ===
"Suddenly military" (reservist and National Guard) families face additional challenges, related to isolation from other military family peers, and isolation within their home-town communities, not faced by traditional military families.

With the increased demands on the U.S. military, Reservists and National Guardsmen have been increasingly and repeatedly called to active duty. The children of these reservists and guardsmen, who are suddenly called to extended active duty, are technically military brats, but they may not identify with or share all of the characteristics of traditional brats (although in certain specific areas, such as war-related issues, they may share a great deal). In an effort to help integrate "suddenly military" brats, groups like "Operation: Military Kids" and "Our Military Kids" came into existence. Operation: Military Kids is a program designed to help "suddenly military" children understand the military culture to which they now belong, and Our Military Kids provides monetary grants that support tutoring, sports and other extracurricular activities of National Guard and Reserve children, whose parents sometimes incur a lapse in income upon being called to active duty.

National Guard families, in particular, are often not as familiar with military culture. The servicemember parent may have been a direct entry into the National Guard and may have never initially/previously served on extended active duty with the Army or Air Force. While some units are assigned to large active duty military installations with all of the associated family support capabilities, the military installation to which most National Guardsmen are normally assigned may be an Army National Guard armory or readiness center or a small Air National Guard base on a civilian airport many miles away, all which lack the family support infrastructure of an active duty military base.

Reserve and National Guard families, unless they reside adjacent to an active duty military installation, also tend to be physically separated from other military families, meaning they may get less emotional support during wartime, and may not be as emotionally prepared for active duty deployment, especially to a combat zone. Both the formal and informal support structures available for the regular military families are not as readily available to reservist and National Guard families. Operation: Military Kids teaches "suddenly military" brats about military culture and expectations.

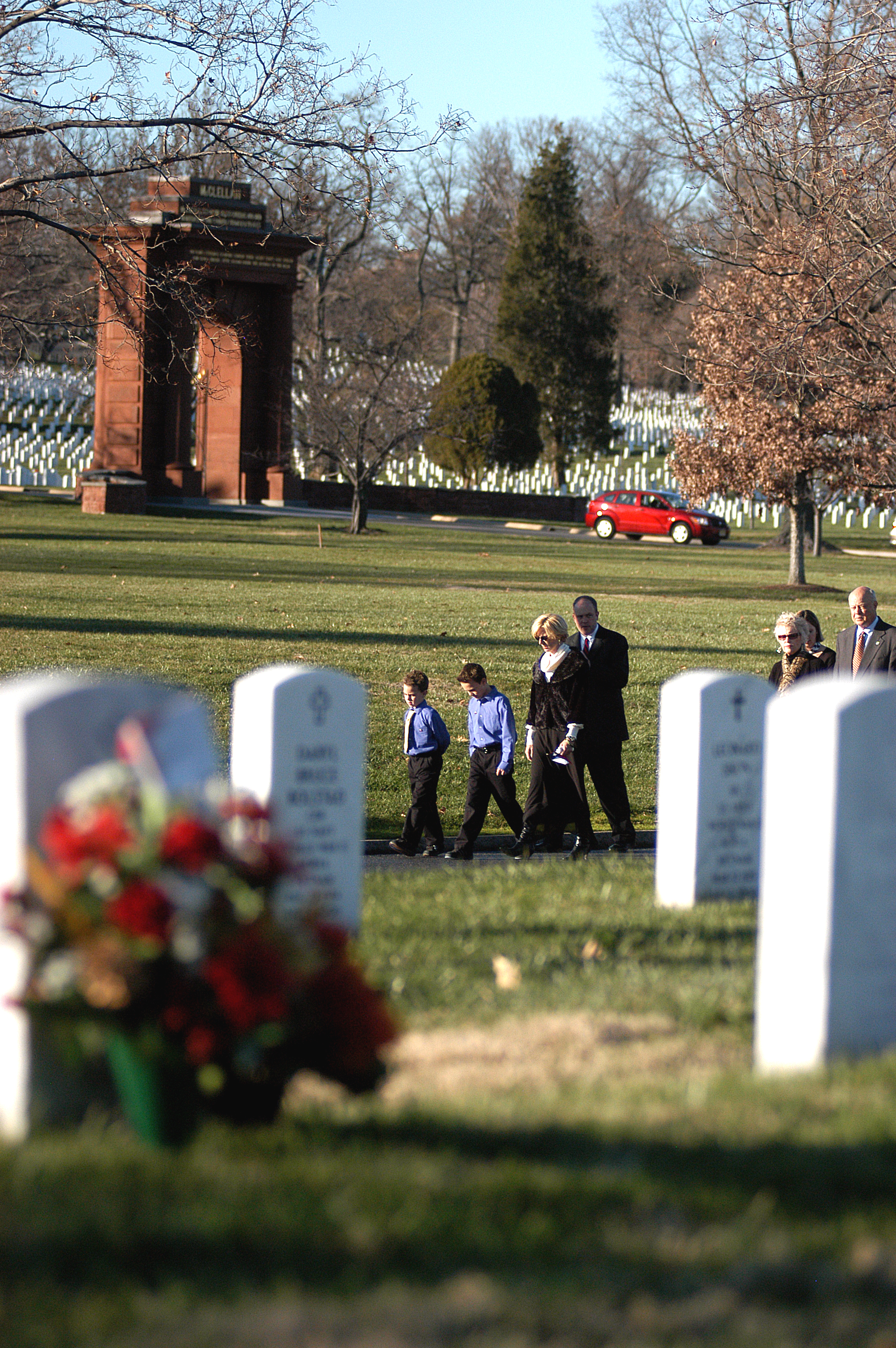
Family members of a deceased US Airman walk to a grave site.

Children of Reservists and National Guardsmen also do not share the highly mobile aspect of "regular service" military brat life. They may, however, still develop feelings of difference or isolation in relation to non-military children or teenagers in their home towns, due to war-deployment related stresses and war-aftermath issues that their non-military peers may not be able to fully understand. Consequently, it may be harder for teachers and health care professionals to identify and address war-deployment-related child, adolescent or family problems, unless they are specifically screened for. Although the family may not be as fully immersed in military culture, individual reservist and National Guard parents may still effect varying degrees of militarization of the family social environment and the child's upbringing. Some children born to no-longer active duty veterans may also experience a number of these issues.

=== Death of a parent in combat ===
The effect of having a parent killed during military operations has not been specifically studied. Limited studies on children who have lost a parent show that 10–15% experience depression and a few develop childhood traumatic grief (the inability to recall any positive memories of the deceased parent). Military psychiatrist Stephen Cozza speculates, based upon his experience, that the long-term effects of having a parent killed during war would be more traumatic and difficult to deal with than typical causes of parental death.

=== Peacetime military deaths ===
Training and preparing for war also involves significant dangers, as do other military duties. Consequently, many military brats live with the reality of risk to one or both parents even when there is no active war. Peacetime military accidents claim lives every year at a significantly higher rate than accidents for the civilian population; some service professions such as military pilots and flight officers, paratroopers and other airborne soldiers, special operations forces, aircraft carrier flight deck personnel, Coast Guard sea and air-sea rescue, ordnance or munitions workers, military firefighters, as well as those training or drilling in live ammunition exercises, all experience higher annual death rates. Such casualties are difficult, if not impossible, to keep hidden from children or teenagers in small base communities.

== Month of the Military Child ==
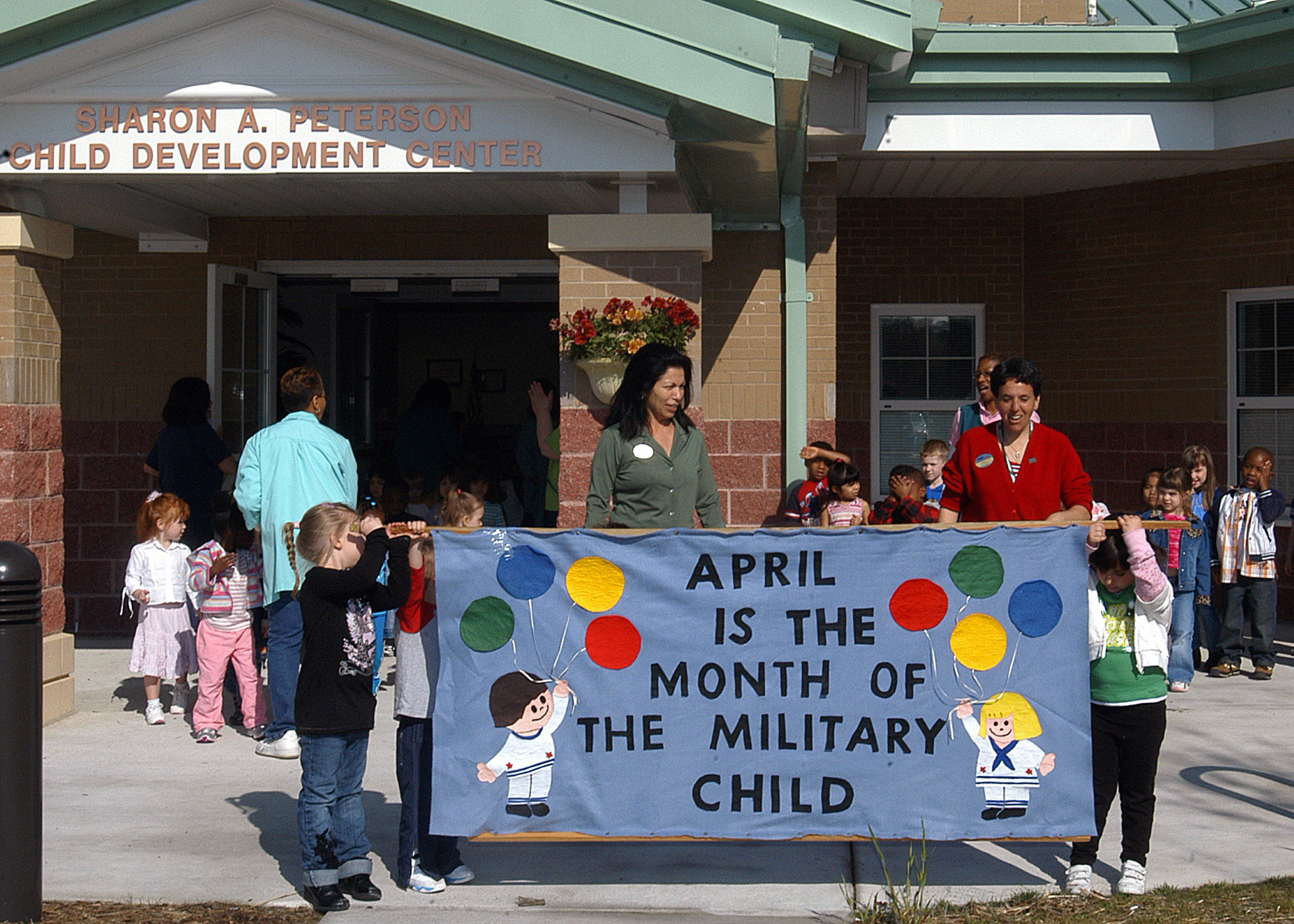
"Month of the Military Child" activity at Naval Air Station Oceana, Virginia.

Beginning in 1986, Secretary of Defense Caspar Weinberger establish the first Month of the Military Child to be celebrated every April. The Department of Defense reported in 2023 that there were 1,511,167 military children in both active and reserve families. The celebration has taken on the color purple and the dandelion flower because the flower takes root and blooms wherever they are planted. Dandelion seeds fly on the wind to destinations all over the globe. Dandelions often symbolize happiness, joy, perseverance, endurance, and hope. The Department of Defense also uses the term military brat in some of its research and literature about military children.

== Community for former military brats ==
As adults, military brats sometimes try to reunite with their brat heritage.

The 2002 book Military Brats and Other Global Nomads: Growing Up in Organization Families writes of several reasons why some military brats, as adults, seek out brat organizations. Military brats can feel a "sense of euphoria" when they discover that other brats share the same feelings and emotions. According to the book, brats share a bond with one another through common experiences that transcends race, religion, and nationality. Another common theme behind their joining brat organizations is to stay connected or reconnect with their old friends. With all the focus on veterans, the children are left to grow up in sometimes harsh, usually very strict environments with no recognition and no help. With enormous differences between military children and civilian children, one might think that there would be inquiry into the effects, yet few can be found readily available. Mary Edwards Werstch writes about her experiences, as well as the experiences of those she has interviewed, in her book Brats: Growing up inside the Fortress. Pat Conroy also sheds light on the difficult circumstances of growing up in his book (later a movie), The Great Santini.

== History of term ==
=== Origin of military brat ===
Military spouses and their children have been following armies for thousands of years, perhaps for as long as there has been organized warfare. The term Little Traveller, used to describe the travelling child of a soldier (following his or her father's army from place to place), also appears in literature as early as 1811. Google Books shows the first appearance of military brat in print in 1929, and of army brat in 1938.

In Johnson's Dictionary of 1755, brat is defined as either "a child, so called in contempt" or "the progeny; the offspring". Examples are quoted from Spenser's The Faerie Queene, published in 1590; Coriolanus and The Winter's Tale by Shakespeare (1564-1616); and two unidentified works by Swift (1667–1745).

The claim that "brat" (in the military sense) has been used for a century or more and that it stands for "British Regiment Attached Traveller" is folk etymology, a backronym. There are no appearances of this phrase dating back that far, and English acronyms were almost non-existent before the mid-20th century.

=== Modern perception ===
Noted military brat researcher Mary Edwards Wertsch polled 85 ex-military children as to whether or not they liked the term military brat, and only five respondents (5.9% of the study group) objected to the term.

The term is now widely used by researchers and academicians and so is no longer merely a slang term, but a name clearly attached to a recognized and well-studied segment of U.S. culture: "Most of the professional research on growing up in military families has contributed to the perpetuation of the 'brat' label," sociologist and noted expert on the study of military brats Morten Ender wrote. "It is no wonder that the label endures and is as popular as ever."

Linguistic reclamation is the appropriation of a pejorative epithet by its target, to turn an insult into a positive term and deny others the ability to define it; non-military personnel may find the term brat insulting if they do not understand the context. Sociologist Karen Williams used it reluctantly in her research, with the disclaimer, "to follow the wishes of the participants. It is a term that they use and feel comfortable with."

There is evidence that professional military culture has also reclaimed ownership of the term. Admiral Dennis C. Blair, former Commander in Chief, U.S. Pacific Command, and former U.S. Director of National Intelligence, said, "There's a standard term for the military child: 'Brat.' While it sounds pejorative, it's actually a term of great affection." This trend is also visible among notable and influential civilians: Senator Ben Nelson, a member of the United States Senate Committee on Armed Services, wrote, "when the word 'brat' is used to describe someone it is not meant as a compliment, but when it is preceded by another word and becomes "military brat" it becomes a term of endearment." Congresswoman Carol Shea-Porter said, "I married what is affectionately known as an Army brat." Senator John Cornyn identifies himself as a military brat, and also identified Judge Janice Brown as one, during her confirmation hearing before the United States Senate Committee on the Judiciary. Military culture has created numerous positive backronyms for "brat", such as "Born, Raised And Transferred" or "Brave, Resilient, Adaptable, and Trustworthy". While some may not like the origins of the term, most are comfortable with it.

In late 2014, two civilian children's book authors advocated the use of the acronym CHAMPs (Child Heroes Attached to Military Personnel) as a replacement for brat. The adult military brat community soundly rejected the proposal.

== History of research efforts ==
=== Coining of the term third culture kid and early research ===
In the 1970s, sociologist Ruth Hill Useem coined the term third culture kids (TCKs) for a child who follows their parents "into another culture." Useem used the term third culture kids because TCKs integrate aspects of their birth culture (the first culture) and the new culture (the second culture), creating a unique "third culture". Globally, offspring of military households comprise about 30% of all TCKs, but they are almost exclusively from the United States.

=== Start of Department of Defense research ===
Systematic research on individuals in such environments has been conducted since the 1980s. Responding to social and psychological issues recorded in military families and communities, the U.S. Armed Forces sponsored research on the long-term impact of growing up as a military dependent. Outside of the U.S. there is no significant literature on the effects of growing up as a military dependent. Since the Department of Defense does not track or monitor former brats, any study on adult brats is based upon self-identification. Thus, even though the studies are performed using scientific sampling methods, they may contain bias because of the difficulty in conducting epidemiological studies across broad-based population samples. Some researchers used referrals, the Internet, and newspaper articles to identify military brats.

=== Mary Edwards Wertsch: Identification of military brat cultural identity ===
In 1991, Mary Edwards Wertsch "launched the movement for military brat cultural identity" with her book Military Brats: Legacies of Childhood inside the Fortress. In researching her book, Wertsch identified common themes from interviews of over 80 offspring of military households. While this book does not purport to be a scientific study, subsequent research has validated many of her findings. In the introduction to the book, former military brat Pat Conroy, the author of The Prince of Tides and The Great Santini, wrote,

Her book speaks in a language that is clear and stinging and instantly recognizable to me [as a brat], yet it's a language I was not even aware I spoke. She isolates the military brats of America as a new indigenous subculture with our own customs, rites of passage, forms of communication, and folkways . ... With this book, Mary [Wertsch] astonished me and introduced me to a secret family I did not know I had.

=== Brats: Our Journey Home ===
In 2005 military brat and filmmaker Donna Musil released the first documentary ever made exclusively about military brats, Brats: Our Journey Home. To date, the documentary has won six film awards. Musil furthers the premise that military brats form a distinct American subculture with a commonly held sense of identity that is actually a distinct American ethnicity. The documentary also draws on many studies interviews of researchers, counselors and psychologists, along with interviews of numerous former military brats.

=== Perceived invisibility of culture and experiences ===
Musil's documentary also highlights the feeling among many military brats that the culture and lives of military brats are largely invisible to most Americans. Some sparse and superficial aspects of military brat life may be known, but a fuller sense of awareness of one of America's largest (and oldest) subcultures is largely non-existent. The documentary starts with country music singer and military brat Kris Kristofferson calling military brats "an invisible tribe" comprising 5% of the American population.

The documentary closes with another quote from former military brat and author Pat Conroy, who writes,

We spent our entire childhoods in the service of our country, and no one even knew we were there.

== See also ==
- Disenfranchised grief
- Foreign Service brat
- Global nomad
- Military history of the United States
- Missionary Kids
- National Military Family Association
- Piper Reed, a series of books about a Navy brat
- Unrooted Childhoods: Memoirs of Growing up Global

== Notes ==
1. These are generally derived by including the parent's branch of service along with the word "brat": "Army brat", "Navy brat/junior", "Marine brat/junior", "Coast Guard brat", "Air Force brat"
