= Unrooted Childhoods =

Unrooted Childhoods: Memoirs of Growing up Global
- Author: Faith Eidse; Nina Sichel
- Language: English
- Publisher: Nicholas Brealey Publishing
- Publication date: 2004; 22 years ago
- Pages: 228
- ISBN: 978-1-85788-338-1

Unrooted Childhoods: Memoirs of Growing up Global is a book of memoirs of several people who grew up in multiple countries, or moving frequently between distant regions within the same country, also known as third culture kids. It is edited by Faith Eidse and Nina Sichel. It documents the life, including the unique challenges, feelings of difference/outsiderism, and gifts, of growing up in multiple nations, cultures, and language-regions. It was first published in 2004.

== Primary authors ==
- Faith Eidse (born February 19, 1955) is a writer and author. She received the Kingsbury Award and was nominated for the Bellwether Prize. She grew up in Congo/Zaire, Canada, and the United States.
- Nina Sichel, born in the U.S. and raised in Venezuela, is a writer, former editor and ESL teacher.

== Notable contributors ==
- Isabel Allende is a Chilean writer who grew up as a Chilean Foreign Service brat.
- Clark Blaise is a Canadian-American author and former director of the International Writing Program.
- Pat Conroy is a military brat and author. His works include The Great Santini.
- Ariel Dorfman is an author and professor at Duke University.
- Ruth Hill Useem is a writer and researcher and is credited with coining the term "third culture kid".
