= Useem =

Useem is a surname. Notable persons with the surname include:

- John Useem (1910–2000), American anthropologist and sociologist, husband of Ruth Hill Useem
- Michael Useem, American economist and professor
- Ruth Hill Useem (1915–2003), American anthropologist and sociologist
