= Foreign Service =

Foreign Service may refer to:

- Diplomatic service, the body of diplomats and foreign policy officers maintained by the government of a country
- United States Foreign Service, the diplomatic service of the United States government
  - Foreign Service Officer
  - Foreign Service Institute
  - Foreign Service Journal
  - Foreign Service brat, term for children born or raised abroad to Foreign Service Officers
- Indian Foreign Service, the diplomatic service of India
  - Foreign Service Institute of India now the Sushma Swaraj Institute of Foreign Service, under the Ministry of External Affairs in New Delhi, India
- Foreign Service of Pakistan, the diplomatic service of Pakistan
  - Foreign Service Academy
- His Majesty's Diplomatic Service, the diplomatic service of the United Kingdom, and specifically the organisation which ran the Foreign Office in London before amalgamation with the Diplomatic Service in 1918
