= Betty Olsen =

Nurse and missionary in the Vietnam war

Betty Ann Olsen
- Born: October 22, 1934; Bouaké, French West Africa (now Côte d'Ivoire)
- Died: September 26, 1968 (aged 33); Đắk Lắk Province, South Vietnam (now Vietnam)
- Occupations: Nurse, missionary

Betty Ann Olsen (October 22, 1934 – September 26, 1968) was an African-born American nurse and missionary. She was killed while captive as a prisoner of war by the North Vietnamese Army during the Vietnam War.

== Early life ==
Betty Olsen was born on October 22, 1934, in Bouaké, French West Africa, present-day Côte d'Ivoire, one of two daughters of missionaries Walter Olsen and Elizabeth Olson, serving with the Christian and Missionary Alliance. She attended a missionary kids school some distance from her parents for her primary schooling. For high school, she attended the Hampden-Dubois Academy in Mount Dora, Florida, then a boarding school which often served the children of missionaries. While at the academy she decided to dedicate her life to being a missionary.

Oslen trained as a nurse at Brooklyn Methodist Hospital from 1953 to 1956. She worked as an obstetrics nurse at Nyack Hospital while attending Nyack Missionary College in Nyack, New York. She graduated in 1962 with a major in missions. However, she wavered about her desire to do missionary work, writing "I remember saying to the Lord at this time that if this is all there is to the Christian life, then I don't want it." For a time she stayed with her parents while they were in Seattle, then went to Chicago and worked as an obstetrics nurse at West Suburban Hospital.

== Missionary career and captivity ==
In 1963, she again decided on missionary work and successfully applied to the Christian and Missionary Alliance. The next year, she trained in a Hong Kong leprosarium in preparation for work in Vietnam during the Vietnam War. She wrote "Most of the people that I have told about going to Vietnam are greatly concerned, and I appreciate this; however, I am not concerned, and I am very much at peace. I know that I may never come back, but I know that I am in the center of the Lord's will and Vietnam is the place for me."

Olsen was sent to Da Nang, where she worked in the missionary hospital and studied Vietnamese. Two nights a week she taught English to a class of sixty Vietnamese students, mostly teenagers. She told a reporter about her students "They are particularly curious about America. I told them about the skyscrapers and the subways but I am afraid they didn't understand subways or why anyone would want them." Every Saturday morning she volunteered at the USO Club in Da Nang, where she attracted attention from servicemen as a rare single Western woman in the city, earning her the nickname the "Belle of Da Nang". She turned down all of their romantic overtures, telling a reporter "I am not interested in romance, and I have no idea of getting married."

The next year, Olsen was sent to continue her preparation in Da Lat. Her final destination was her assignment at a leprosarium outside of Buôn Ma Thuột, a city about 200 miles northeast of Saigon.

As a provincial capital, Buôn Ma Thuột was one of the targets of the Tet Offensive in January 1968. The missionary compound was bombed and eventually overrun and eight of the thirteen missionaries were killed or died later in captivity. Olsen endured ten months in captivity, with forced day-long marches, beatings, inadequate food, and no medical attention. Fellow captive agricultural aid worker for USAID, Michael D. Benge, recalled Olson's death on September 26, 1968:

We were allowed to rest for a couple of days near a supply depot. The NVA prepared us a meal of rice, corn, mung beans and a little meat. Also, they cooked some bamboo shoots I had been allowed to gather. We were ravenous and wolfed down the food, noticing that the bamboo shoots were more bitter than usual. It was meant to be our "last supper." Before we could finish, we had severe stomach cramps and dysentery. The soldiers had poisoned us by not boiling the bamboo twice to remove the cyanic acid. Unable to get out of her hammock, Betty lay for three days in her own defecation before she died. They wouldn't even allow me to clean her up.

Benge helped bury Olson in the jungle in Đắk Lắk Province near the Cambodian border.

== Awards and honors ==
Betty Olsen was posthumously awarded a citation for "Heroic Medial Work" by the Vietnamese government.
