= CJL =

CJL or cjl may also refer to:

- Communauté Juive Libérale a Jewish community
- Cultural jet lag
- Chitral Airport IATA code
