= The India Way (2010 book) =

2010 book

- Author: Peter Capelli, Harbir Singh, Jitendra Singh and Michael Useem
- Publisher: Harvard Business Press
- Publication date: 2010

The India Way: How India's Top Business Leaders Are Revolutionizing Management is published by the Harvard Business Press. It's a non-fiction book written by Peter Cappelli, Harbir Singh, Jitendra Singh, and Michael Useem of the Wharton School at the University of Pennsylvania. The book was released in the United States on March 23, 2010, and was released in India in May 2010. The India Way primarily focuses on the contrast in business management styles between the U.S. and India. Topics discussed in the book include topics such as leadership skills, company governance, human resources management, and innovation. The authors’ conclusions are based on an analysis of nearly 130 interviews conducted with Indian CEOs and executives.

== Overview ==
The key phrase of the book, "the Indian way", is coined by the authors to signify a particular style of business management which they argue is the unique engenderment of the culture and history of India. It is a modern take on an earlier book, the Toyota Way. The book’s major claim is that there are certain practices prevalent in Indian business, such as paying special attention to the management of human resources and engaging in corporate social responsibility, which could be extremely beneficial to other models of business, particularly those in the West.

According to the authors, the primary difference between Indian and Western business styles lies in the degree to which corporate goals and strategies reflect the company's core values. The book claims that, as a general rule, Indian corporations are far less concerned with shareholder interests than Western businesses and that they prefer to concentrate on the long term prosperity of the company, employees, and surrounding community. The book goes on to say that because Indian executives motivate their employees with larger company and social goals, they are afforded significantly higher levels of trust and respect from their workforce and communities than their Western counterparts.

== Chapter summary ==
Chapter 1: The authors identify four key attributes of "the Indian way", which are as follows:

- Holistic Engagement of Employees.
- Improvisation and Adaptability.
- Creative Value Propositions.
- Broad Mission & Purpose.

Chapter 2: The authors explain the economic and historical context for "the Indian way" and present five distinct areas in which the key attributes of the business style are played out.

These topics, which are discussed in depth in the subsequent chapters, are as follows:

- People Management (Chapter 3).

Indian businesses see their employees "as assets to be developed, not costs to be reduced", and have a strong sense of obligation to them. As a result, improving workforce capability becomes an ongoing process.

- Executive Leadership (Chapter 4).

This is a case of necessity creating a virtue. The complexity of doing business in India means successful companies have to be extremely flexible and creative to achieve their ends (e.g., concepts like Jugaad among others).

- Competitive Strategy (Chapter 5).

Intense domestic competition and highly cost-conscious consumers imply that Indian companies have become skilled at developing new product and service concepts (e.g., Tata Nano motor car).

- Company Governance (Chapter 6).

Instead of simply focusing on shareholder value, Indian companies, say the authors, are more inclined to consider family, social, and national goals in developing and executing their strategies. While acknowledging that some of the India way is a specific adaptation to Indian conditions, the authors argue that there are specific lessons in people management, executive leadership, competitive strategy, corporate governance, and social responsibility that can be applied by leaders of Western companies. Unlike the state capitalism of China, the India Way, say the authors, "preserves the logic of free markets and democratic institutions", yet "appears to avoid some of the apparent rapaciousness and excesses of the American model."

- Social Responsibility (Also Chapter 6).
- Comparisons made in the previous chapters and summarize their general conclusions (Chapter 7).

== About the authors ==
The book is written by Peter Cappelli, George W. Taylor Professor of Management and director of the Center for Human Resources at the Wharton School, University of Pennsylvania, Harbir Singh, the William and Phyllis Mack Professor of Management and co-director of the Mack Center for Technological Innovation at the Wharton School and Jitendra Singh, the Saul P. Steinberg Professor of Management and former Vice Dean for International Academic Affairs at the Wharton School and Michael Useem, William and Jacalyn Egan Professor of Management and director of the Center for Leadership and Change Management at the Wharton School.
