= David C. Pollock =

American sociologist & author (1939-2004)

David C. Pollock (June 9, 1939 – April 11, 2004) was an American pastor, missionary, author, and speaker known for his expertise on Third Culture Kids (TCKs).

Pollock was the founder and executive director of Interaction International and co-author of Third Culture Kids: Growing Up Among Worlds. His definition of TCKs is widely referenced:

[A] person who has spent a significant part of his or her developmental years outside the parents' culture. The TCK builds relationships to all of the cultures, while not having full ownership in any. Although elements from each culture are assimilated into the TCK's life experience, the sense of belonging is in relationship to others of the same background.

The son of a preacher in New York, Pollock graduated from Moody Bible Institute in 1960. He obtained a B.S in biblical literature from Houghton College in 1963. He taught Bible at Moffat College of Bible while in Kenya from 1977 to 1980. During that time he and his wife served as dorm parents at Rift Valley Academy, a missionary boarding school. In 1993 he was named Houghton College's Alumnus of the Year, and received an honorary degree of Doctor of Pedagogy (DPd) from Houghton in 2000. There he also served as an adjunct professor of sociology in Intercultural Studies beginning in 1986.

Throughout his life Pollock played a variety of roles as a speaker and consultant for the U.S. State Department and a number of embassies,{{Citation needed}} a board member for organizations centered on TCKs, and the Director of Transitions for Global Associates. He also dedicated time toward missionary kids (MKs), through co-directing the Global Member Care Task Force, organizing International Conferences For Missionary Kids, and co-directing orientation for personnel in international Christian schools. In addition he served as a pastor while in New York, New Jersey prior to living in Kenya, and later for two years in Vermont.
