= Existential migration =

Expatriates driven by non-economic motivation

Existential migration is a term coined in 2006 by Greg Madison in Existential Analysis journal. Madison's term describes expatriates (voluntary emigrants) who supposedly have an "existential" motivation to travel, unlike economic migration, simple wanderlust, exile, or variations of forced migration. ‘Existential migration’ is conceived as a chosen attempt to express something fundamental about existence by leaving one's homeland and becoming a foreigner.

== Research ==
As well as the new concept of existential migration, the research proposed a novel definition of home as interaction; that the ‘feeling of home’ arises from specific interactions with our surroundings that could potentially occur anywhere, at any time. This is in contrast to the usual definition of home as a fixed geographical place. The new concept also challenges our usual definitions of being at home, the experience of foreignness, what constitutes belonging, and the nature of homelessness. The insights gained from this new concept elaborate our existing understanding of migration in exciting ways. Existential migration suggests reformulations of the psychological underpinnings of migration studies, cultural anthropology, tourism studies, cross-cultural training, refugee studies, and psychotherapy. Madison's research presents its subject matter in a clear and evocative way, emphasising the actual stories of voluntary migrants in order to convey the poignancy of the topic.

The phenomenological research that gave rise to the concept of existential migration (Madison, 2006) also suggests a cautionary note regarding the psychological impact of increasing globalisation. While globalisation is frequently presented as an economic evolution of capitalism and as a market necessity, there is scant discourse about the impact that these profound changes in world structure may have upon the experience of people in their daily lives. Although the phenomenological research on voluntary migration needs further critique, the first research does suggest that the world community may in fact be entering an age of global homelessness. Of course recent economic turbulence has curtailed the increasing expectation that young professionals should be prepared to live abroad in order to enhance their career prospects and indeed many, especially in the financial sector, are unexpectedly returning home after foreign assignments. However, even these returns home are often more problematic than expected and rather than return, they seem to resemble yet another migration due to the subsequent changes in person and home environment since the original leaving.

The concept of existential migration has generated considerable comment from voluntary migrants around the world as well as psychological and social science researchers, though there remains precious little in print about these fundamental existential motivations for migration. The concept has commonalities with some of the work on cosmopolitanism by the anthropologist Nigel Rapport. A book on the subject, entitled The End of Belonging, is available publicly. The research is increasingly cited by new international researchers and artists exploring the experience of voluntary migration.

== See also ==
- Cosmopolitanism
- Global nomad
- Third culture kid
