= Cultural jet lag =

Expression in sociology

The expression cultural jet lag (or cultural jetlag) was coined by Marc Perraud during his research into cross-cultural psychology. He describes the expression as the phenomenon of partial socialization in adults born from bi-cultural/national unions and whose childhood was characterized by nomadic displacement during key personality developmental stages. Jet symbolically designates international travel as the cause, cultural lag the resulting disconnect observed in these patients.

Originally the author used the expressions social jet lag and cultural jet lag interchangeably, however the expression social jet lag has since more widely become associated with an unrelated delayed sleep phase syndrome and cultural jet lag has therefore become the conventional term. Cultural jet lag is sometimes just referred to by its initials: CJL. During some of the presentations of his research, Marc Perraud also coined the term cultural schizophrenia to explain the elements of confusion in children constantly exposed to changing cultural and moral environments. This expression is to be seen only as an attempt at vulgarization using popular imagery and does not refer to the actual accepted psychological definition, diagnosis or symptoms of clinical schizophrenia.

Incidentally, the expression cultural jet lag was also used in the 1980s as a title for a comic strip, that focused on providing social commentary in the United States (featured in the Humor Times). This title reflects the notions of distance between the author and the subject of his cultural satire but does not reflect the literal and total connotations of the definition cited prior. (disambiguation)

== People most commonly affected ==
Cultural jet lag refers to the feeling of disconnect that third culture kids (TCKs), as they have now become known, experience in relation to any culture, including the ones from which they stem. This disconnect, also present in adult third culture kids (ATCKs), applies to all the cultures to which they are/were exposed, whether it be their parents' cultures or those to which they were exposed during their upbringing through international travel.

== Symptoms and characteristics ==
Third culture kids, those that were brought between countries, and in a bi-cultural environment, also referred to as global nomads, typically experience varying degrees of cultural jet lag. While they exhibit high levels of cross-cultural competence (3C)—in that they are in tune with the different cultures between which they grew up, sometimes illustrating more astute understanding than mono-cultured counterparts because of their multiple referential points—they generally have the feeling that they remain outside the culture, looking in. They do not experience the same drives, desires and constraints as other non-TCK members of their cultures and feel like constant spectators to any visceral dynamic (patriotism, identification, national pride, duty, allegiance, sports fan, political involvement etc.)

Cultural jet lag drives a disconnect that can have varying levels of sociability impact on the TCK depending on their character and their support structures (friends and family in particular). Research done at scenyc, a company that regroups one of the largest concentration of TCKs (90% of employees), has shown that:

- All TCK employees exhibit some degree of cultural jet lag, while symptoms vary in breadth and intensity from person to person
- The cultural disconnect they experience with any mono-cultured person, even well-travelled, makes their natural tendency to seek out and bond with others experiencing the same condition. This holds true in friendship, in love and in work relationships.
- CJL appears to increase the prevalence of certain psychological traits/abnormalities: antisocial behavior, relationship and commitment difficulties, apathy and boredom, substance abuse, social anxiety and malaise, light depression, and a shared feeling of lack of identity, of referent and of ownership.
- On the flip side CJL seems to pre-dispose individuals to develop and be rewarded for their unique perspective on the world. This manifests itself through a higher than usual prevalence artistic and creative activities: advertising, design, music, creative writing—all of which it is postulated require a certain abstraction from conventional social and cultural models. CJL also seems to predispose TCKs to educational fields and/or careers that directly tap into their global awareness and perspectives: international relations, humanitarian and strategic thinking

== Other similar cross-cultural phenomena ==
Cultural jet lag is sometimes confused with several apparently close but dissimilar cross-cultural phenomena:

- Culture shock. Simply put, culture shock appears as a result of a discrete decision by an individual to travel abroad. CJL differs from culture shock in that it is not associated to a precise event but rather a lifelong condition linked to the particularities of an uprooted upbringing. CJL neither appears abruptly nor subsides over time, it is a state of being that characterizes those that have experienced a culturally de-structured upbringing. Someone's realization or third party diagnosis of CJL may be sudden, in the form of an "a-ha" moment, but they will quickly realize that it is simply an explanation of their state of being from as long as they can remember.
- CJL also differs from the cultural disconnect that remains between the expatriate and their host country once they have overcome the initial culture shock. Despite the feeling of disconnect with the host country, the expatriate will never feel lost for they still maintain a sense of bond to their original culture. Even if this bond dissipates slowly with time, the expatriate will never exhibit the same psychological symptoms as those that characterize CJL. This is because the expatriate will always rely on the psychological stability they developed based on a stable mono-cultural referential during key youth developmental stages.
- CJL also differs from what has been called reverse culture shock, the reaction caused by an expatriate returning to their home country after years of being abroad. As with the example described above, no one can suddenly experience cultural jet lag as its symptoms stem from an atypical developmental environment and not a situational stimuli during adulthood (i.e. after character formation maturity).

== Ongoing research ==
Some research has been done on the third culture kids. However this research has primarily described attributes, anecdotes and summarized basic behavioral/sociological observations. While the serious study of the psychological mechanisms and impacts of cultural jet lag is still in its infancy, it has been brought to the forefront because of the impact globalization has had on the number of children and future adults that will experience CJL.

Research currently underway is testing the postulate that cultural jet lag stems from an atypical crystallization of the super-ego during the child developmental phases. While typical children inherit morals and values first from their parents and then from their environments in a second stage, culturally jet lagged children, devoid of a single moral and cultural referential in their environment, later develop an overstated role of id in their ego balance (referring to Freudian theory).

Statistical research is also underway to identify the psychological impacts of CJL, in particular the:

- Prevalence of clinical psychological abnormalities in culturally jet lagged adults
- Preferred psychological coping mechanisms of culturally jet lagged adolescents
- Comparing the statistical distribution of Myers Briggs profiles in CJL adults vs. the general population
