= Michael Useem =

American academic

- Education: University of Michigan; Harvard University
- Occupation: Academic
- Employer: Wharton School of the University of Pennsylvania
- Parent: Ruth Hill Useem

Michael Useem is an American academic. He is the William and Jacalyn Egan Professor of Management at Wharton School of the University of Pennsylvania, where he is also the director of the Center for Leadership and Change Management. He is the author of several books.

== Selected works ==
- The Leader’s Checklist
- The Leadership Moment
- Investor Capitalism
- The Go Point: When It’s Time to Decide
- The Edge
