= Third culture kid =

Person raised in a culture other than that of their parents

Third-culture kids (TCK) or third-culture individuals (TCI) are people who were raised in a different culture than their parents for a large part or the entirety of their childhood and adolescence. It usually refers to people who moved between cultures during their formative years due to a parent's career. Relocating permanently to another country is not usually included when describing a TCK; therefore, second-generation immigrants to any country are not usually described as TCKs. They typically are exposed to a greater volume and variety of cultural influences than those who grow up in one particular cultural setting. The term applies to both adults and children, as the term kid refers to the individual's formative or developmental years. However, for clarification, sometimes the term adult third culture kid (ATCK) is used.

In the expression "third culture kid", the first culture is the one in which the parents grew up; the second culture refers to the one in which the family currently resides; and the third culture is the fusion of these, the one to which the child will identify the most. This modern understanding is the inverse of Useem's originally proposed concept, which established the first culture as the one defined by the locals, and the second by those who moved abroad (in the research by Useem, this was Americans).

TCKs are often exposed to a second (or third, fourth, etc.) language while living in their host culture, being physically exposed to the environment where the native language is used in practical aspects of life. "TCKs learn some languages in schools abroad and some in their homes or in the marketplaces of a foreign land. ... Some pick up languages from the nannies in the home or from playmates in the neighborhood". This language immersion is why TCKs are often bilingual, and sometimes even multilingual.

== Origins ==
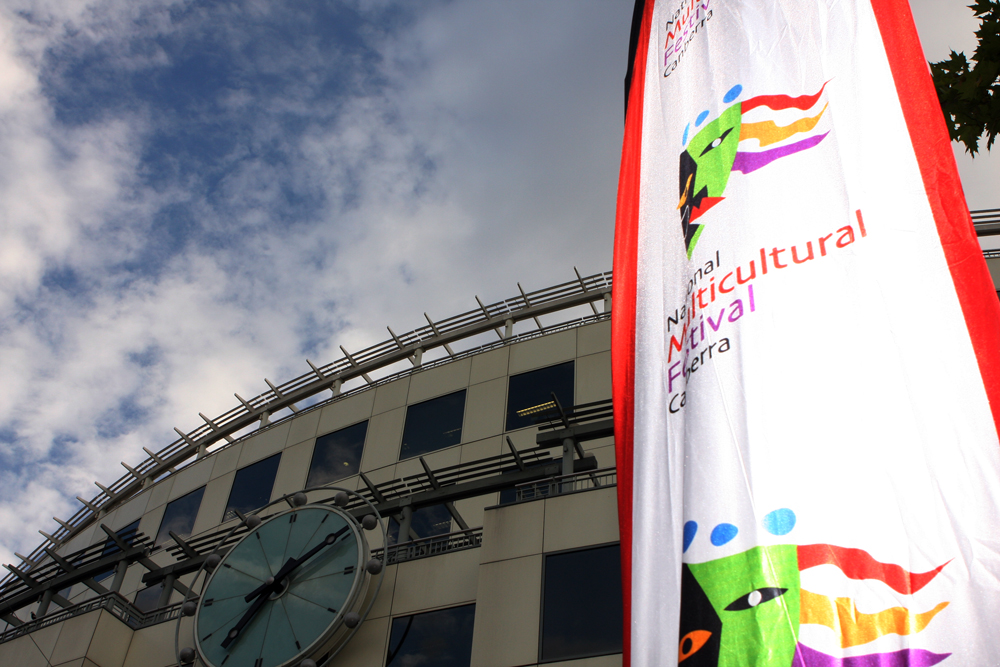
A banner from the National Multicultural Festival in Canberra, Australia

The term third culture kid was first coined by Michigan State University professor Ruth Useem in the 1960s, who used it to describe the children of American citizens working abroad. Ruth Useem had previously introduced the concept of a "third culture" with her husband John Useem, who was a sociology professor at MSU, following their second year-long visit to India. They travelled to India with their three children.

Useem et al. (1963) depicted individuals who had undergone such an experience as having distinct standards of interpersonal behavior, work-related norms, codes of lifestyle and perspectives, and communication. This creates a new cultural group that does not fall into their home or host culture, but rather share a culture. The initial participants in this third culture were Indian and American professionals. Later, Ruth Useem took an interest in the children and how their experiences were shaped by life abroad. In 1993 she wrote:

In summarizing that which we had observed in our cross-cultural encounters, we began to use the term "third culture" as a generic term to cover the styles of life created, shared, and learned by persons who are in the process of relating their societies, or sections thereof, to each other. The term "Third Culture Kids" or TCKs was coined to refer to the children who accompany their parents into another society.

— Ruth Hill Useem

In 1984, author and researcher, Norma McCaig, an American citizen who grew up in Asia as the daughter to a pharmaceutical executive, suggested the closely related concept global nomad, in order to take into account that the child's situation was as a result of a parent or parents' career or life choice(s).

Kay Branaman Eakin, the former education counselor for the United States Department of State, worked with American families returning to the United States after having lived abroad. She described a TCK as "someone who, as a child, has spent a significant period of time in one or more culture(s) other than his or her own, thus integrating elements of those cultures and their own birth culture, into a third culture."

David C. Pollock and Ruth Van Reken pioneered the TCK profile with the publishing of their book, Third Culture Kids: The Experience of Growing Up Among Worlds (first edition 1999), which brought to light the emotional and psychological realities that come with the TCK journey, often resulting in feelings of rootlessness and grief but also an increased confidence and ability to interact with many cultures. Both Pollock and Van Reken had personal experiences in the missionary community, Van Reken had been a MK herself in Nigeria. Their definition of what it means to be a TCK is widely referenced: "[A] person who has spent a significant part of his or her developmental years outside the parents' culture. The TCK builds relationships to all of the cultures, while not having full ownership in any. Although elements from each culture are assimilated into the TCK's life experience, the sense of belonging is in relationship to others of the same background." Through interviews and personal writings, this seminal work explored the challenges and benefits that TCKs encounter. Later editions widened the net to discuss the experiences of CCKs (cross-cultural kids) who may be immigrants, international adoptees or the children of biracial or bicultural parents.

Critiques of this definition assert this approach is so expansive that it can be applied to almost anyone who has felt marginalized in their society regardless of whether they have ever lived abroad. Pollock himself admitted that this defintion may be "inadequate" as a sociological or anthropological research term, explaining that he used it to help those who have experienced global mobility establish "a point of reference." Van Reken also clarified in personal correspondence the defintion was not designed for research purposes.

== General characteristics ==
Third culture individuals are particularly adept at building relationships with other cultures while not possessing a cultural identity of their own. They can also be referred to as cultural hybrids, cultural chameleons, and global nomads. It has been discussed in the past that the characteristics that have been put forth by prominent researchers in the TCK field have only been discussed when referring to American children who have lived abroad. However, there has been further research done on TCKs that shows that the same characteristics described by Pollock and Useem in the most prominent TCK literature also apply to individuals from other nations who have also lived abroad for extended periods of time during their developmental years. There are benefits and challenges to being a TCK according to various researchers on the subject. The term TCKs may be applied to all social classes and includes immigrant and refugee students (Dewaele 8c van Oudenhoven, 2009).

=== Benefits ===
- Expanded worldview: TCKs have an understanding that there is more than one way to look at situations that they are exposed to or experience. This can also be a challenge however, when TCKs return to a culture that is homogeneous in their belief system, as an expanded worldview is perceived as offensive or useless.
- Third-dimensional view of the world: With an increased number of hands-on experiences in multiple cultures, there is a difference in the way that the world is perceived. For example, there has been an increase in cross-cultural authors, such as Khaled Hosseini, author of The Kite Runner, who have received awards for their works that are written from a multicultural perspective. These authors are able to provide vivid descriptions about the cultures they have directly experienced and thus their work appears to be "three-dimensional."
- Interpersonal sensitivity: Increased exposure to a variety of perceptions and lifestyles allows TCKs to monitor their emotions, and register societal norms and cues more adeptly so as to produce higher sensitivity to other cultures and ways of life.
- Cross-cultural competence or cultural intelligence: the capacity to function effectively across national, ethnic, and organizational cultures.
- TCK have been found to have higher levels of general adjustment as opposed to mono-cultural children. Cultural adaptability is also a benefit, although may also come as a challenge which results from lack of cultural balance.
- The major benefit is related to language exposure, according to Tracy Tokuhama-Espinosa.

=== Challenges ===
- Confused loyalties: Third culture kids can experience a lot of confusion with politics and values. This is especially the case when moving from collectivist to individualist cultures, or vice versa, as the values within each culture are different from the other. This issue is also related with the identity crisis, on a cultural level, not being able to feel a sense of oneness with any one nationality or culture. Oftentimes, TCKs cannot answer the question: "Where is home?"
- Painful awareness of reality: difficulty adjusting to cultures where the only culture that is discussed or focused on is itself.
- Ignorance of home culture: TCKs are often lacking in knowledge about their home nation, culture, town, or family. With current technology leading to the globalization of information, this is becoming increasingly less of a challenge provided the TCKs use modern technology in their host cultures to connect to their home culture. Understanding a culture's sense of humor, however, is a commonly cited difficulty with the transition back to a home culture. There are also general societal norms and practices that will not be known when a TCK is first re-introduced to their home culture but those are eventually learned.
- Difficulties with adjusting to adult life: the mixture of influences from the various cultures that the individual has lived can create challenges in developing an identity as well as with a sense of belonging. Feelings of rootlessness and restlessness can make the transition to adulthood a challenging period for TCKs.
- Studies have shown ATCKs to be less ethnocentric, less prejudiced, less authoritarian, and more tolerant than non-ATCKs. However, one study found that American ATCKs demonstrated more prejudice than non-American ATCKs on the Cognitive subscale of the QDI and the Social Dominance Orientation scale (SDO).
- There is a need for special attention for young TCKs in educational settings to make sure they are supported when and if entering a new school. This would allow for an optimal learning experience for the child.
- "Walters and Auton-Cuff (2009) found that female TCKs hesitate to develop relationships and have less emotional affect as compared to non-TCKs. Furthermore, female TCKs' identity development was delayed because of their focus on adjusting rather than creating a sense of belonging (Walters & Auton-Cuff, 2009)."

== Psychological effect ==
=== Identity ===
One of the challenges of being a third culture individual is developing a sense of belonging, commitment, and attachment to a culture. These factors play a strong role in one's self-esteem and identity, and are especially apparent as present or not present among TCKs. There are psychological benefits to being a bi-culturally competent individual, meaning that adjustment to the host culture and repatriation do not pose a difficulty for the individual. Individuals who do not experience this same smooth transition into the new culture are referred to as "culturally rootless" and "cultural homelessness". Culturally homeless (CH) individuals often experience confusion over their identity and especially because the TCK is frequently abroad during the adolescent development years when identity is most solidified psychologically.

When individuals who have spent a significant number of their developmental years in a host culture and have not been able to adapt, develop an identity, and do not feel as though they belong, they are considered "culturally homeless". Cultural homelessness has been found to have both advantages and disadvantages, at times to being associated with low self-esteem, perceiving less control over one's own life, and an unsatisfactory level of experience with belonging and attachment.

== Research ==
Though research initially largely focused on children in missionary families or children of diplomats, it has since expanded to other populations, including non-U.S. citizens. The researchers who pioneered the TCK research, such as Ruth Useem, were not expecting to find as many participants as they did. Useem and Cottrell, for example, were seeking at least 100 participants to respond to a survey that they believed to be "unconsciously long" but instead had 680 participants (ranging in age from 25 to 84 years) respond to the questionnaire. Instances like this one indicate to researchers the potential in exploring a subject matter that is still open to much research.

=== Increased tolerance ===
From the research that has been conducted on TCKs, it has been found that subjects are generally more tolerant of different cultures and of people of different backgrounds than subjects from the same home country who are not TCKs. In addition, TCKs generally feel that they are better able to adapt to new cultures and understand how to behave appropriately in these new environments. Researcher and teacher Wenda Sheard surveyed some of her multi-cultural students, most of whom were fluent in two or more languages, and found that many felt that they had an increased tolerance of other cultures. However, as one student explained, part of this tolerance was out of necessity for maintaining a healthy social life in one's new environment and culture.

In a study by Dewaele and van Oudenhoven (2009), it was found that TCKs scored higher on the open-mindedness scale on the Multicultural Personality Questionnaire (MPQ). According to the study, "this dimension [of the test] evaluates for open and unprejudiced attitudes toward out-group members, as well as diverse cultural norms and values."

=== Intellectual effect ===
Though the intellectual effect of being a TCK has not yet been widely explored, there has been some research in the area. One particular study by Lee and Bain (2007) that was found to have significant findings was conducted on young native Koreans who had recently moved to the United States and were attending school in America. The researchers were looking to see how these students would respond to explicit instruction aimed to work with their originality and fluency and that is specific to TCKs. This was measured through the level of creativity demonstrated in assigned tasks given to the students. TCKs were found to be able to demonstrate significantly higher levels of creativity and originality for problem solving than TCKs not given this same explicit instruction. This study has implications for the ways that TCKs can be instructed differently from the traditional curriculum to enhance their creativity and problem solving abilities because of their third culture experience.

Intellectual effect is also possible through differences in choosing to continue studies in higher education after high school. In 2001, it was found by the U.S. Bureau of Labor Statistics that 61.7 percent of 2001 high school graduates were enrolled in college. That same year, it was found that 95 percent of the TCK population were either enrolled or had some college education. Twenty-nine percent of this population had received an advanced degree, which is also higher than the percentage of the general population.

=== Gender differences ===
Much of the literature and research surrounding TCKs has found that these individuals are more open to learning new languages, demonstrate more flexibility when interacting with a novel culture than their monoculture peers, and have a greater interest in continuing a global nomad lifestyle, which includes an interest in international careers. It has been found that women are more inclined to seek out interpersonal relationships while men are more task-oriented in their relationships and choices. Such findings were used in the hypothesis of a study conducted by Gerner & Perry (2000) that predicted that gender differences would also be found in the cultural acceptance and experiences of TCKs.

Both non-U.S. citizen females and U.S. citizen females were found to have more positive ratings of cultural acceptance, acquisition or exposure to a new language, travel, and interest in going into an international career in the future and were less prone to stereotypes.

== Education and counseling ==
With the growing number of international business, military placements, and immigration, there has been a growing number of TCKs. Third culture kids are being educated in a culture that is not their own. Schools and teachers need to be aware of the culture differences these students face. Studies have found that educators and counselors should be culturally competent and possess the knowledge to properly educate these types of students. This would create an effective and optimal environment for their learning and adjusting abilities. Research has indicated that TCKs need special attention during their transition phase. The stress and grief students feel during transitional phases can distort their psycho-social development, which can affect their grades and school work. Therefore, TCKs need a comfortable and inviting school setting to offset the effect of their transition. The best way for counselors to work with TCKs is to have sound knowledge about the students and their unique characteristics.

=== Emotions ===
Empirical research was done by Katholiki Georgiades, Michael H. Boyle, and Kelly A. Fife on emotional and behavior problems among adolescent students, specifically immigrant students. They examined the relationship between immigrants and racial/ethnic congruence in school. They hypothesized that school belonging is the connection between congruency and emotional problems. Although their study was unable to find enough evidence to support their hypothesis, they agree that school belonging influences emotional-behavioral problems. According to other studies, TCKs are proven to have less emotional stability than those who grew up in more culturally and socially stable environments.

== Careers that lead to TCKs ==
=== Military ===
TCKs who have parents or guardians affiliated with the military have varying levels of exposure to local culture. This is due to the possibility of living on- or off-base. TCKs who live off-base or who are not closely affiliated with the military (such as contractors) will have higher exposure and cultural shaping, while those who spend the majority of their time on the base will have lower exposure and minimal cultural shaping. Military children who are immersed in local culture from birth tend to show an extremely high level of cultural shaping, and upon relocation they are likely to experience culture shock and cling to said culture for years, if not for life. Relocation for these particular TCKs has shown to be particularly marring for them emotionally. See also Military brat (U.S. subculture).

=== Non-military government ===
Some of these TCKs may grow up moving from country to country in the diplomatic corps (see Foreign Service brat) while others may live their lives near military bases.

=== Religious ===
Missionary kids (MKs) typically spend the most time overseas, of any TCKs, in one country. 85% of MKs spend more than 10 years in foreign countries and 72% lived in only one foreign country. Of all TCKs, MKs generally have the most interaction with the local populace and the least interaction with people from their passport country. They are also the most likely of the TCKs to integrate themselves into the local culture. 83% of missionary kids have at least one parent with an advanced degree. Missionary kids struggle to adjust to the parents' culture; the majority of MKs identify mostly with the country in which their parents served.

=== Business ===
Another career that can lead to TCKs is a career in business. Sixty-three percent of business TCKs have lived in foreign countries at least 10 years but are more likely than children in missionary families to live in multiple countries. Business TCKs have fairly high interaction with both their host nationals and people from their host country.

=== Other ===
Not all TCK families have one of the four careers listed above. Other careers include working for an intergovernmental agency (for example, the Nuclear Energy Agency, the Commonwealth Secretariat, and the International Agency of the Francophone), an international public or non-governmental organization (for example, an international school or serving as international staff of the United Nations or one of their agencies), and a local organization such as a hospital. Working in media or athletic industries (for example, Wally Szczerbiak) can also mean being moved abroad. Like most of the other careers that send employees abroad, involvement with the host culture can vary greatly.

Recent research into the 'other' category has identified a subgroup of TCKs now labelled EdKids. These are children who relocate to various countries with their parents who are educators in international schools. This creates a unique paradigm of a nuclear family whose family-work-school-social experiences are intertwined.

== Career decisions ==
=== Effect on the workforce ===
Third culture individuals, with their international experience, generally value the international aspect of their lives. In a survey given to TCKs in 2001, there was a strong interest among TCK participants to continue to travel as they move into adulthood and their future careers, and many continued to maintain their internationally acquired languages. It was also found in these surveys that approximately half of the participants continue to travel at least once a year and that just a little under 15 percent travel for business. TCKs have also been found to report selecting to study majors while in college that could have the options of having international careers. Some of these fields of study include business, nursing, and teaching English as a foreign language.

Below are tables showing some of the fields that TCK go into.

Type of work	Missionary	Military	Government	Business	Other
Executive/admin	17%	40%	35%	10%	24%
Semi/Professional	61%	34%	38%	47%	53%
Support (secretarial/technical)	17%	27%	15%	16%	13%
Sales	5%	6%	7%	5%	4%
Other	1%	4%	5%	6%	6%

Work setting	Missionary	Military	Government	Business	Other
Business/financial	22%	32%	27%	20%	17%
Education	25%	23%	17%	17%	28%
Health/social services	24%	7%	13%	23%	13%
Self-employed	11%	14%	14%	14%	14%
Government	3%	5%	5%	7%	8%
Military	2%	10%	6%	1%	2%
Non-medical professional	3%	6%	12%	11%	10%
Arts/media	0%	3%	5%	4%	7%
Religious	10%	0%	0%	2%	1%

== Language ==
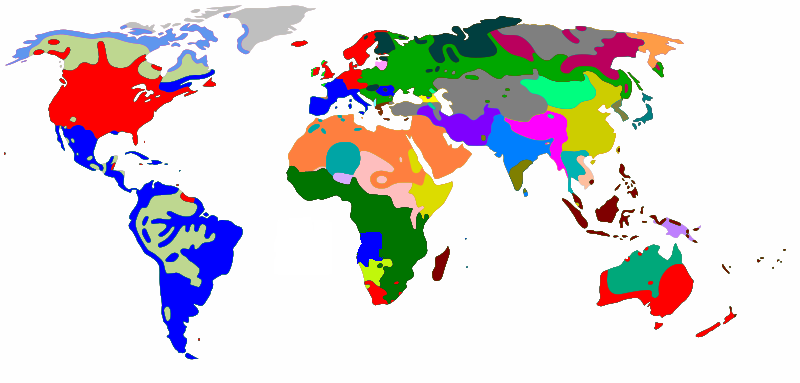
A map of the world's major language family sub-groups

Most international TCKs are expected to speak English and some countries require their expatriate families to be proficient with the English language. This is largely because most international schools use the English language as the norm.

Families tend to seek out schools whose principal languages they share, and ideally one which mirrors their own educational system. Many countries have American schools, French schools, British schools, German schools and 'international schools' which often follow one of the three International Baccalaureate programs. These will be populated by expatriates' children and some children of the local upper middle class. They do this in an effort to maintain linguistic stability and to ensure that their children do not fall behind due to linguistic problems. Where their own language is not available, families will often choose English-speaking schools for their children. They do this because of the linguistic and cultural opportunities being immersed in English might provide their children when they are adults, and because their children are more likely to have prior exposure to English than to other international languages. This poses the potential for non-English speaking TCKs to have a significantly different experience from TCKs for whom English is a native language. Research on TCKs from Japan, Denmark, Italy, Germany, the United States and Africa has shown that TCKs from different countries share more in common with other TCKs than they do with their own peer group from their passport country.

A few sociologists studying TCKs, however, argue that the commonality found in international TCKs is not the result of true commonality, but rather the researcher's bias projecting expectations upon the studied subculture. They believe that some of the superficial attributes may mirror each other, but that TCKs from different countries are really different from one another. The exteriors may be the same, but that the understanding of the world around them differs.

=== Kikokushijo ===
In Japan, the use of the term third culture kids to refer to children returned from living overseas is not universally accepted; they are typically referred to both in Japanese and in English as kikokushijo, literally 'returnee children', a term which has different implications. Public awareness of kikokushijo is much more widespread in Japan than awareness of TCKs in the United States, and government reports as early as 1966 recognised the need for the school system to adapt to them. However, views of kikokushijo have not always been positive; in the 1970s, especially, they were characterised in media reports and even by their own parents as "educational orphans" in need of "rescue" to reduce their foreignness and successfully reintegrate them into Japanese society.

== Statistics (U.S. TCKs) ==
Research has been done on American TCKs to identify various characteristics:

=== Cognitive and emotional development ===
- Teenage TCKs are more mature than non-TCKs, but, in their twenties, they take longer than their peers to focus on their aims.
- Depression is comparatively prevalent among TCKs.
- TCKs' sense of identity and well-being is directly and negatively affected by repatriation. The severity of the effect from repatriation may also depend on the degree of cultural and linguistic differences between the TCK's place of recent residence and place of repatriation.
- TCKs are highly linguistically adept (not as true for military TCKs).
  - A study whose subjects were all "career military brats"—those who had a parent in the military from birth through high school—shows that brats are linguistically adept.
- Like all children, TCKs may experience stress and even grief from the relocation experience.

=== Education and career ===
- In the US, TCKs are four times as likely as non-TCKs to earn a bachelor's degree (81% vs 21%).
- 44 percent earned undergraduate degree after the age of 22.
- Education, medicine, business management, self-employment, and highly skilled positions are the most common professions for TCKs.

== See also ==
- American-born Chinese
- American-Born Confused Desi
- Cultural jet lag
- Culture shock
- Existential migration
- Global mobility
- Identity crisis (psychology)
- Military brat
- Missionary kid
- Relocation (personal)
- Social alienation
