= Foreign Service brat =

Term for children born or raised abroad to the United States Foreign Service

In the United States, a Foreign Service brat, also known as a diplobrat, embassy brat or Foreign Service kid, is a person whose parent(s) served full-time in a Foreign Service posting abroad during their childhood. While the term brat is sometimes considered derogatory, many who identify with this background view it neutrally and may even take pride in it. A Foreign Service brat often spends much of their childhood outside their parents' home country.

Similar to military brats, missionary kids, or other third culture kids, Foreign Service brats face frequent moves and possible parental absence. Some follow in their parents' footsteps, while most choose private sector careers. Many feel distinct from their peers upon returning to the U.S., a process referred to as repatriation.

== Features of lifestyle and culture ==
=== Housing ===
Many Foreign Service brats relocate every two to three years, and occasionally at higher frequencies. These relocations typically alternate between overseas assignments and domestic postings in the United States - most commonly within the Washington, D.C. metropolitan area - to accommodate language instruction and professional development for their parents between diplomatic assignments. While overseas, they usually live in housing owned by the US government near several other expat families. In some cases, they live within the local Embassy compound. In America, they often live in a house owned or rented by their parents, or in corporate housing.

=== School ===
At many overseas posts, they attend English-speaking international schools during grade school. They change schools frequently, sometimes as often as every year. When in America, they often attend public or private schools with little to no Foreign Service brat population. This can make repatriation and culture shock difficult, especially in younger children who are used to interacting with other third culture kids and expatriates and don't have a sense of how their lifestyle may differ.

== Notable Foreign Service brats ==
- Stewart Copeland, drummer for the Police
- Greg Kinnear, actor
- John Kerry, former United States Secretary of State and Presidential candidate
- Kathleen Turner, actress
- William Hurt, actor
- Dylan Walsh, actor
- Oliver Platt, actor
- Chris Van Hollen, United States Senator from Maryland
- Stephen Geyer, songwriter
- Michael Learned, actress
- Mitski, musician

== See also ==
- United States Foreign Service
