= Missionary kid =

Child of missionary parents

Missionary's kids (or MKs) are the children of missionary parents, and thus born or raised abroad (that is, on the "mission-field"). They form a subset of third culture kids (TCKs). The term is more specifically applied when these children return to their "home" or passport country (the country of their citizenship), and often experience various difficulties identifying with fellow citizens and integrating "back" into their "home" culture. The resulting feeling is described as "reverse culture shock".

There is some confusion between the terms MK and TCK. According to the definition developed by Ruth Hill Useem, TCKs are people who have spent a significant part of their developmental years outside their parents' culture. TCK is a broad term that encompasses all children who have grown up abroad (i.e. military kids, diplomats' kids, kids with parents in international business). Missionary kids are just one of the many categories of kids who qualify as TCKs. Therefore, while all MKs are TCKs, not all TCKs are MKs.

In the past MKs usually were almost exclusively American or European, but there is as of 2014 a growing number of MKs from other countries, especially Protestant Christian MKs from South Korea and from Latin America. Generally, this term applies to Protestant Christians; however, it can be applied to any denomination of a religion.

== Definition ==
=== Life overseas ===
While MKs often identify more with the culture or country where they were raised (and this could be multiple cities, countries, or continents) than with where their parents were raised, they are not fully at home in any one culture. David C. Pollock and Ruth Van Reken, the authors of a book on TCKs who both had connections to missionary communities, attribute this feeling of displacement, or rootlessness, to a lack of emotional connection to their home culture (where they "should" feel connected). Many MKs find it difficult to answer questions about where they are from or where home is as they may feel more of an emotional connection to their host culture than to their "home" culture. However, at the same time many MKs are completely aware that they can never fully fit into their host culture. This is especially obvious to MKs growing up in countries where they look different from the local population. Pollock and Van Reken developed the PolVan Cultural Identity Model to explain cultural identity in relationship to the surrounding culture. The Model names four categories into which a person can fall based on how they look and think compared to the culture around them:

Foreigner
look different, think different
Adopted
look different, think alike
Hidden Immigrant
look alike, think different
Mirror
look alike, think alike

When MKs first transition to their new or "host" culture, they are in the foreigner category. As they continue the transition and begin to acclimate and feel at home in their host culture, MKs move into the adopted category, often to the point where MKs feel more at home in the host culture than in their passport culture. At this point, the host culture becomes the MK's home culture. Upon returning to their passport culture, MKs often find themselves in the hidden immigrant category. Because they look like their peers, their extended family remembers how they were prior to their international move and expect them to hold similar views and to act as a typical citizen of that passport country would act. However, as hidden immigrants, MKs look like their family and friends, but more often than not hold many differing views and opinions. Additionally, MKs may not be aware of many of the pop culture influences within their passport country, yet are aware of world and regional issues, which most citizens of their passport country are unaware of. This cultural disconnect can cause awkwardness when they return to their passport country.

Children in the MKs' passport countries often find it difficult to relate to missionary children, and vice versa. While MKs may find the lives of their peers in their passport countries to be boring, sometimes creating challenging social situations, passport country kids may be intimidated by MKs' experience abroad. Cultural miscommunications are common and interesting. While MKs often find it difficult to relate to people from their home culture or target culture, they get along with other MKs very well, even those who are missionaries to (or from) a completely different country. It is the commonality of differences that draws MKs together.

MKs tend to be open-minded and tolerant of many diverse cultures. They often feel more at home in culturally rich environments and can be "homesick" for their foreign home. Their knowledge of a country and its culture typically exceeds language fluency. Upon returning to their passport country, MKs possess unique skills that can be helpful to academics and governments. Because of their international experience, they often have a much broader worldview than their peers. This broader worldview can also lead to mixed emotions about their passport country and its foreign policies.

=== Return to passport country ===
Children who immigrate to the United States have similar experience to MKs when it comes to learning a new culture and making cross-cultural transitions. But according to Pollack and Van Reken, what truly distinguishes MKs from children who immigrate to the United States or other countries is "the full expectation that after living for a significant period of their developmental years outside their passport culture, there will come the day when TCKs make a permanent return to that country and culture." MKs return to their passport country for many reasons, including the beginning of their college education, a shift in their parents' career, and even evacuation in more extreme cases. Extended family and friends's excitement at MKs' return does not usually carry over to the MK. The events surrounding an MK's return may be traumatic (such as in the event of an evacuation due to political unrest), but even under normal circumstances MKs' return to their country of citizenship is a cause of stress and grief. Anxiety and depressions are the two emotions most commonly associated with cross-cultural transitions, caused by a sense of vulnerability and loss of control.

To help MKs cope with the transition back to the United States, many colleges, particularly Christian colleges, have chapters of a student organization called "Mu Kappa International". Mu Kappa aims to help MKs and other TCKs with the transition to American culture and college life. Mu Kappa was founded in 1985 at Taylor University, and has since spread to more than forty other American colleges and universities.

Another frequently used method of helping MKs cope with transitioning from their foreign home to their passport culture is through transition seminars. These seminars typically take place during the summer before an MK's freshman year of college and teach MKs the basics of everyday life in America, including putting gas in a car, opening a bank account, grocery shopping, and many other everyday tasks. Additionally, these seminar can help MKs understand how to deal with the grief of permanently transitioning back to their passport country in a healthy way, and how to manage the stress of a new environment and reverse culture shock.

== See also ==
- Preacher's kid
- Third culture kid
- Military brat

== Sources ==
- Davis P, Headley K, Bazemore T, Cervo J, Sinkinger P, Windham M, Rehfuss M (2010). "Evaluating Impact of Transition Seminars on Missionary Kids' Depression, Anxiety, Stress, and Well-Being". Journal of Psychology & Theology. 38 (3): 186–194. doi:10.1177/009164711003800303. S2CID 140488232.
- Klemens MJ, Bikos LH (2009). "Psychological well-being and sociocultural adaptation in college-aged, repatriated, missionary kids". Mental Health, Religion & Culture. 12 (7): 721–733. doi:10.1080/13674670903032629. S2CID 144670531.
- Pollock DC, Van Reken RE (2009). Third culture kids: Growing up among worlds. Boston: Nicholas Brealey Publishing.
