= Military brat =

Children of military personnel

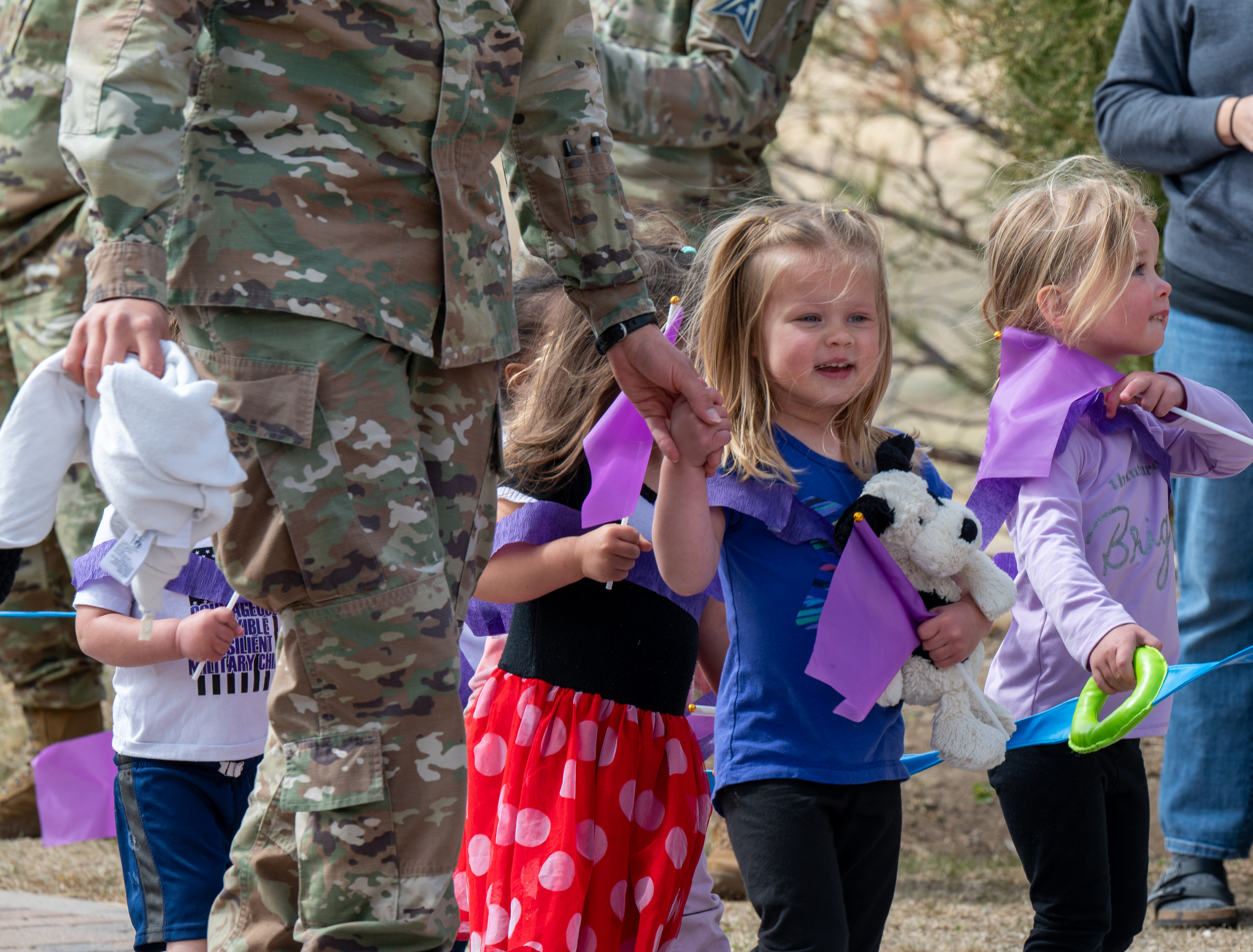
American military brats in 2024

A military brat (colloquial or military slang) is a child of serving or retired military personnel. Military brats are associated with a unique subculture and cultural identity. A military brat's childhood or adolescent life may be immersed in military culture to the point where the mainstream culture of their home country may seem foreign or peripheral. In many countries where there are military brat subcultures, the child's family moves great distances from one non-combat assignment to another for much of their youth.

For highly mobile military brats, a mixed cultural identity often results, due to exposure to numerous national or regional cultures. Within military culture, the term military brat is not considered to be a pejorative (as in describing a spoiled child), but rather connotes affection and respect. War-related family stresses, including long-term war-related absence of a parent, as well as war aftermath issues, are common features of military brat life in some countries, although the degree of war-involvement of individual countries with military brat subcultures may vary.

== Life and culture ==
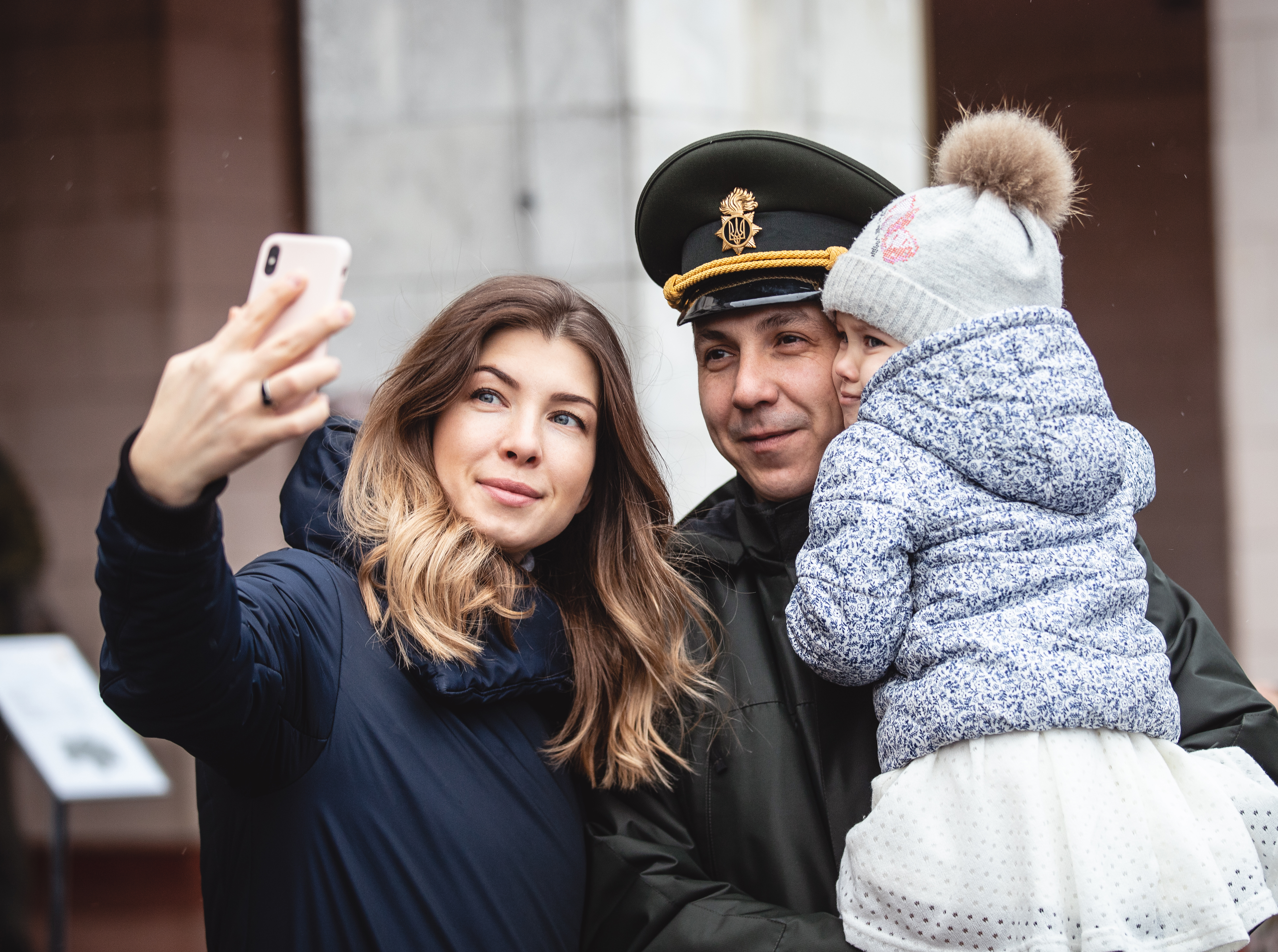
A military family reunion in Ukraine

A common pattern in these subcultures is a heavy childhood and adolescent immersion in military culture to the point of marginalizing (or having significant feelings of difference in relation to) one's national civilian culture. This is characterized by a strong identification with military culture rather than civilian culture. Another term for this is the "militarization of childhood".

In some countries where military brat subcultures occur, there may also be an itinerant or modern nomadic lifestyle involved as the child follows their military parent(s) from base to base, in many cases never having a home town (or at least going through very long periods of being away from one's home town). It also can involve living outside of one's home country at or near overseas military bases in foreign cultures, or in regions within one's home country far from one's home region, along with experiences of significant cultural difference in either case. Highly mobile military brat subcultures have also been described as modern nomadic or peripatetic subcultures.

== Use of term ==
The term "military brat" occurs within military cultures in Australia, India (also called "Cantonment Kids"), Canada (also called "Base Brats"), Pakistan, New Zealand, the United Kingdom, and the United States. Military-dependent subcultures, also known as camp followers, have existed (under various other names) in many parts of the world for thousands of years.

== Feelings of difference, military brat identity versus civilian identity ==
Many military brats report difficulty in identifying where they belong (due to a lifestyle of constantly moving, and also immersion in military culture, and in many cases, also foreign cultures, as opposed to the civilian culture of their native countries, while growing up) and frequently feel like outsiders in relation to the civilian culture of their native countries. The home countries of a number of military brat subcultures have highly mobile (modern Nomadic) lifestyles, or at least significant overseas (or distant-internal) assignments for career military families and their children and adolescents while growing up, including Canada, Britain, France, India, Pakistan, the Philippines, Australia, New Zealand and the United States. These military-dependent subcultures are generations old.

Some ex-military dependents have found that their mobile upbringing has been massively influential in determining their eventual career in adulthood. One example of this is British actress/comedian Dawn French who discussed her childhood as an RAF dependent in an interview with Radio 4. She stated that she felt that the need to make new friends every few years was one of the reasons she discovered her talent for comedy. She also discusses this aspect of her life in her autobiography.

American military brats have also been identified as a distinct American subculture.

== See also ==
- Military dependent official government term in several countries for military brats
- Service Children's Education British Government Agency that administers overseas schools for UK military children
- The Great Santini, film about American Marine brats.
- Third culture kid
