= Global nomad =

Person living a mobile and international lifestyle

A global nomad is a person who is living a mobile and international lifestyle. Global nomads aim to live location-independently, seeking detachment from particular geographical locations and the idea of territorial belonging.

== Origins and use of the term ==
Nomad originally referred to pastoral nomads who follow their herd according to the seasons. Unlike traditional nomads, global nomads travel alone or in pairs rather than with a family and livestock. They also travel worldwide and via various routes, whereas traditional nomads have a fixed annual or seasonal pattern of movement. Although pastoralists are also professional travelers, they move relatively short distances, mostly walking or riding donkeys, horses, and camels. Air travel and the proliferation of information and communication technologies have afforded more opportunities for modern travelers and also engaged a wider range of people in itinerant lifestyles.

In addition to location-independent travelers, the term has also been used for backpackers, lifestyle migrants and third culture kids (highly mobile youth and expatriate children) for highlighting the range and frequency of their travels.

== Lifestyle ==
The global nomad lifestyle is characterized by high mobility. Global nomads travel from one country to another without a permanent home or job; their ties to their country of origin have also loosened. They might stay in any one location from a few days to several months, but at the end they will always move on. Many of them practice minimalism in order to support their frequent moving. Rather than money and possessions, they focus on experiences, happiness, self discovery and well-being. Many have location-independent vocations in fields such as IT, writing, teaching, and handicraft.

== See also ==
- Backpacking (travel)
- Davos Man
- Digital nomad
- Existential migration
- Mobilities
- Nomad
- Perpetual traveler
- Third culture kid
