= Ruth Hill Useem =

American sociologist and anthropologist (1915–2003)

Ruth Hill Useem (31 May 1915 – 10 September 2003) was an American sociologist and anthropologist who introduced the concept of Third Culture Kid (TCK) to describe children who spent part of their developmental years in a foreign culture due to their parents' working abroad. Her work was the first to identify common themes among various TCKs that may affect them throughout their lives. After her retirement in 1985, Useem focused her research on Adult Third Culture Kids (ATCKs).

Third Culture Kids include military brats, missionary kids, diplomatic kids, and business kids. Many books have been written on Third Culture Kids and "Global Nomads" based on the concept originally proposed and defined by Useem.

Ruth Useem graduated with a PhD in sociology and anthropology from the University of Wisconsin–Madison in 1947. She taught at Michigan State University from 1952 to 1985.
