= List of reptiles of Trinidad and Tobago =

This list of reptiles of Trinidad and Tobago is derived from The Reptile Database which includes a total of 116 species of reptiles recorded on Trinidad, The reptiles of Trinidad are made up of 55 species of snakes, 49 species of lizards, 3 species of crocodilians and 14 species of turtles.

On the island of Tobago, 57 species of reptiles were recorded.

Table of contents
Turtles: Cheloniidae · Dermochelyidae · Emydidae · Geoemydidae · Kinosternidae · Podocnemididae · Testudinidae
Crocodilians: Alligatoridae · Crocodylidae
Lizards: Amphisbaenidae · Dactyloidae · Gekkonidae · Gymnophthalmidae · Iguanidae · Phyllodactylidae · Polychrotidae · Scincidae · Sphaerodactylidae · Teiidae · Tropiduridae
Snakes: Aniliidae · Anomalepididae · Boidae · Colubridae · Dipsadidae · Elapidae · Leptotyphlopidae · Typhlopidae · Viperidae

== Turtles (Testudines) ==
Trinidad has a total of 14 species of turtles that are grouped into 7 families. Among them, there are 5 marine species, almost all of them in danger of extinction.

Tobago has a total of 7 species of turtle that are grouped into 4 families.

=== Cheloniidae ===
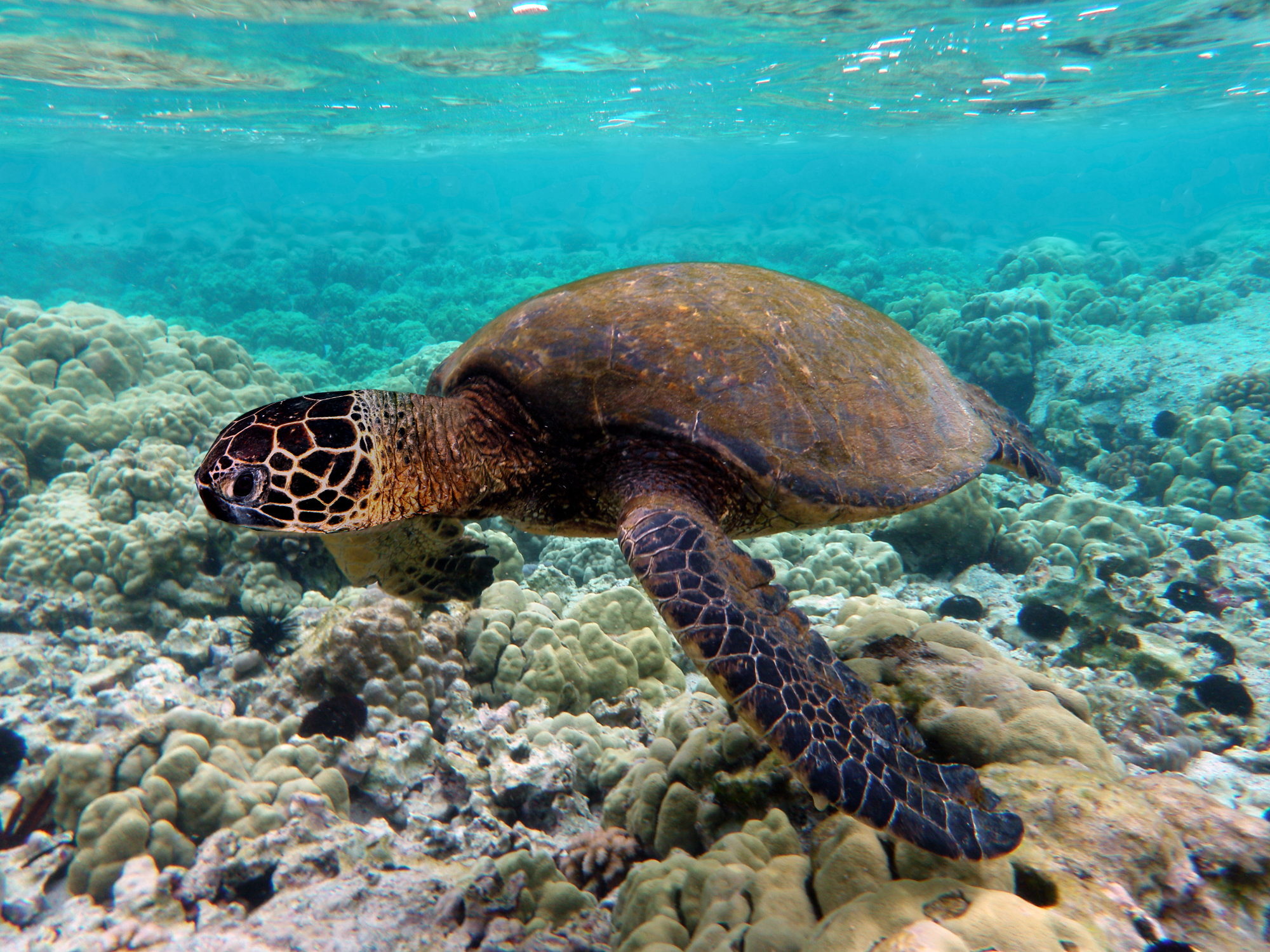
Chelonia mydas

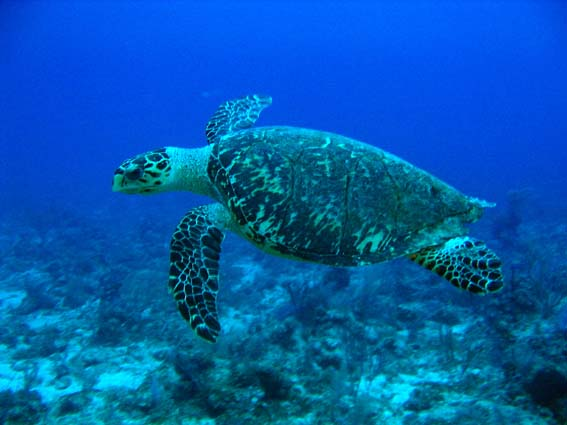
Eretmochelys imbricata

Order: Testudines · Family: Cheloniidae

Sea turtles (Cheloniidae) are a family of large turtles found in all tropical seas and some subtropical and temperate seas. Sea turtles developed from land turtles about 120 million years ago and are well adapted to life in the sea. They feed mainly on jellyfish, crustaceans and squid. 4 chelonids were recorded in both Trinidad and Tobago.

- Caretta caretta (Linnaeus, 1758) EN
- Chelonia mydas (Linnaeus, 1758) EN
- Eretmochelys imbricata (Linnaeus, 1766) CR
- Lepidochelys olivacea (Eschscholtz, 1829) VU

=== Dermochelyidae ===
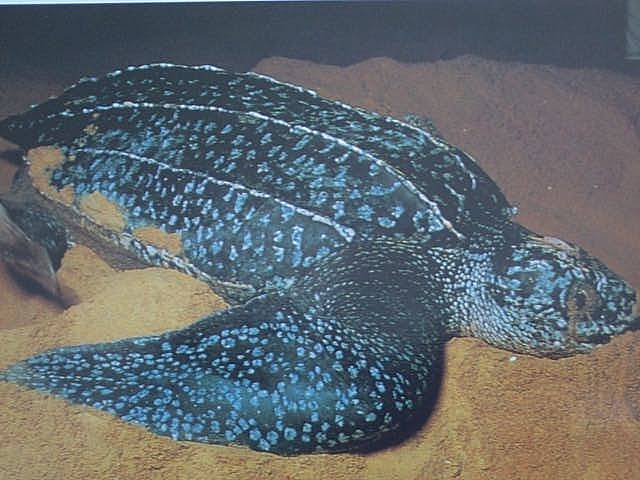
Dermochelys coriacea

Order: Testudines · Family: Dermochelyidae

The leatherback sea turtle (Dermochelys coriacea) is the largest of all existing turtles and can reach a length of 2 metres (6.6 ft) and a weight of more than 600 kilograms (1,300 lb). It is found in all tropical or subtropical seas. Unlike most sea turtles, leatherbacks are often found in the colder waters of temperate zones. It is the only extant species of the Dermochelyidae family and is considered critically endangered. All other species in this family are only known as fossils. This species occurs in both Trinidad and Tobago.

- Dermochelys coriacea (Vandelli, 1761) CR

=== Chelidae ===
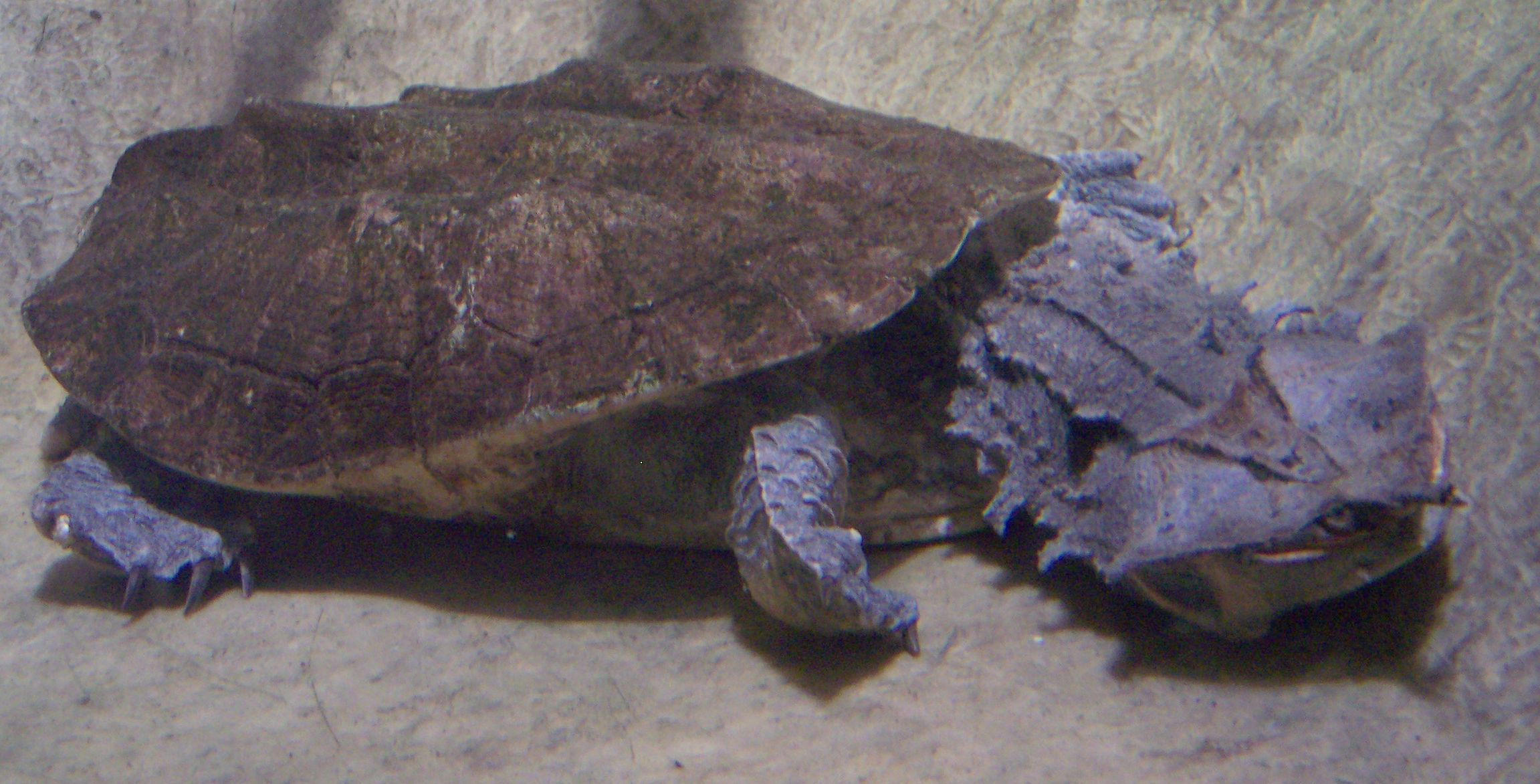
Chelus fimbriata

Order: Testudines · Family: Chelidae

- Chelus fimbriatus (Schneider, 1783)
- Mesoclemmys gibba (Schweigger, 1812)

=== Emydidae ===
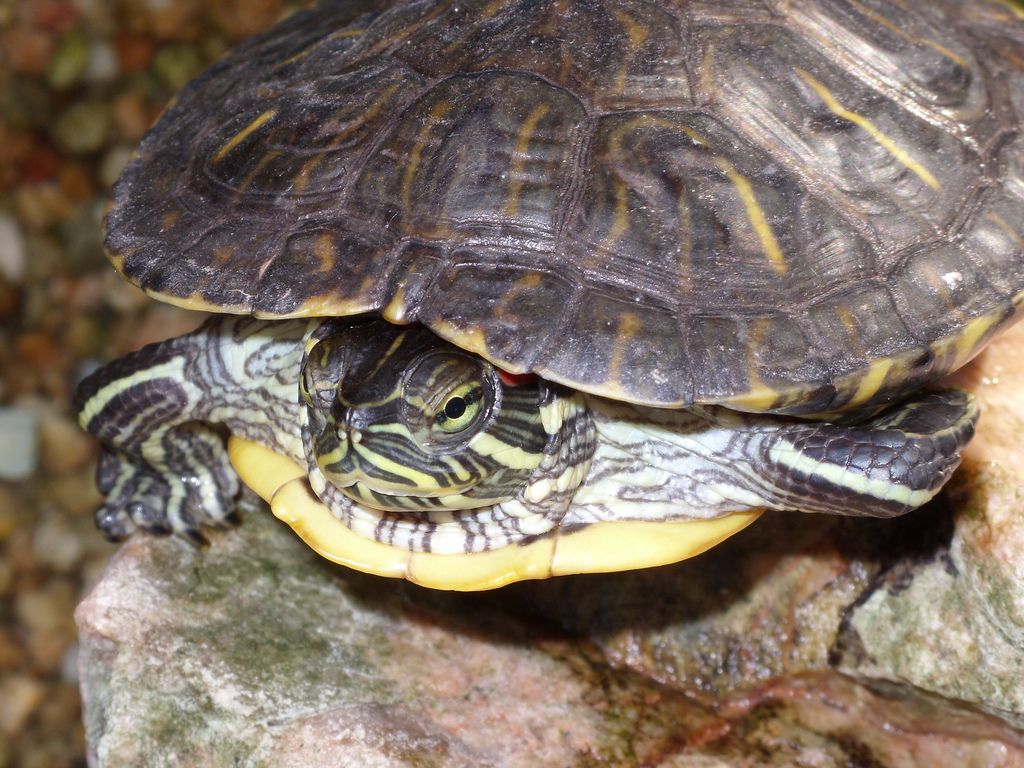
Trachemys scripta

Order: Testudines · Family: Emydidae

The emydidae (Emydidae) are a family of carnivorous aquatic and semi-aquatic turtles. They live most of the time in ponds, reservoirs and rivers, coming to land when they have to find suitable places to lay their eggs. This family is made up of 10 genera that contain more than 50 species. One of them occurs in Trinidad.

- Trachemys scripta (Thunberg in Schoepff, 1792)

=== Geoemydidae ===
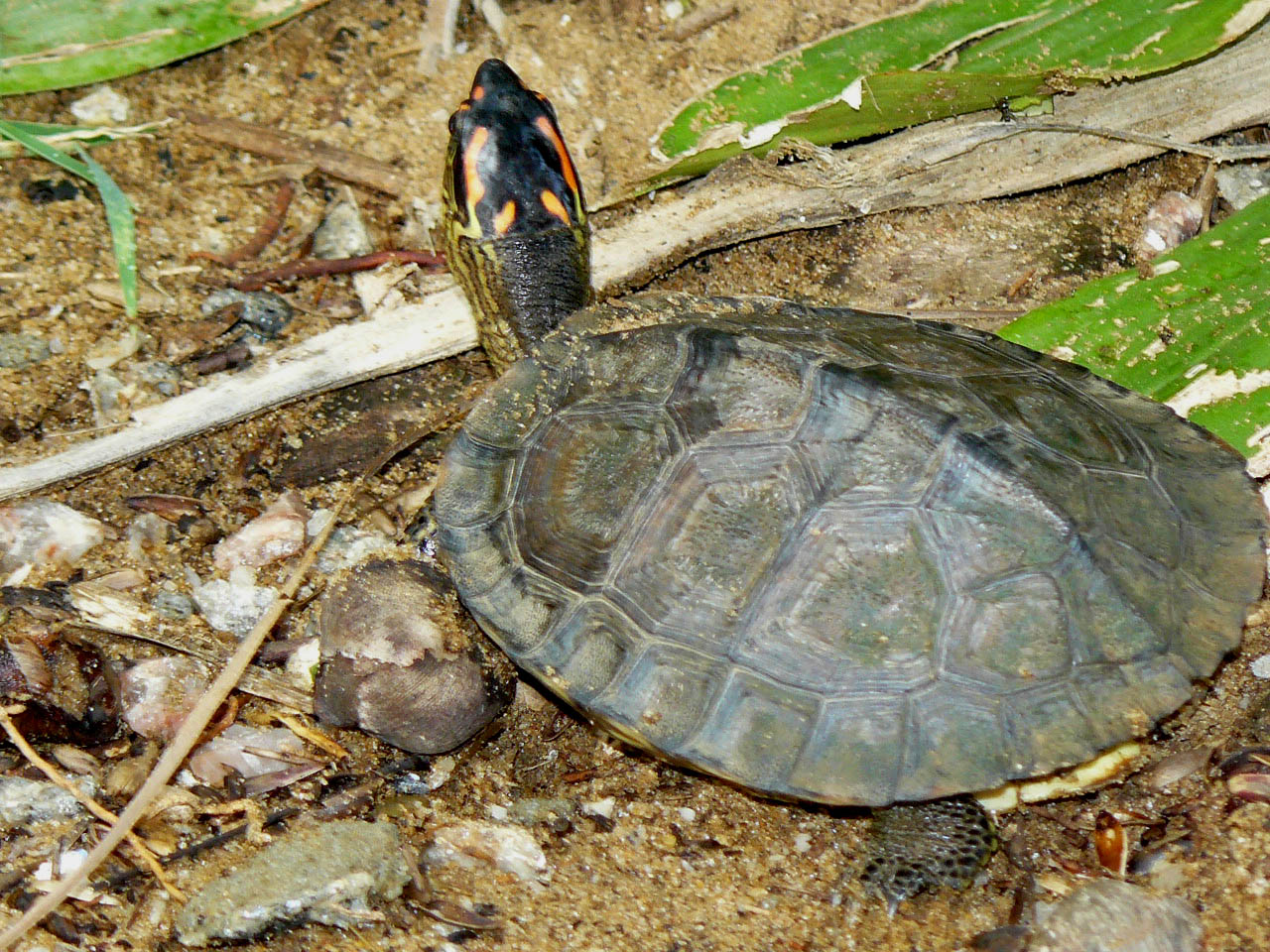
Rhinoclemmys punctularia

Order: Testudines · Family: Geoemydidae

- Rhinoclemmys punctularia (Daudin, 1801)

=== Kinosternidae ===
Order Testudines · Family: Kinosternidae

- Kinosternon scorpioides (Linnaeus, 1766)

=== Podocnemididae ===
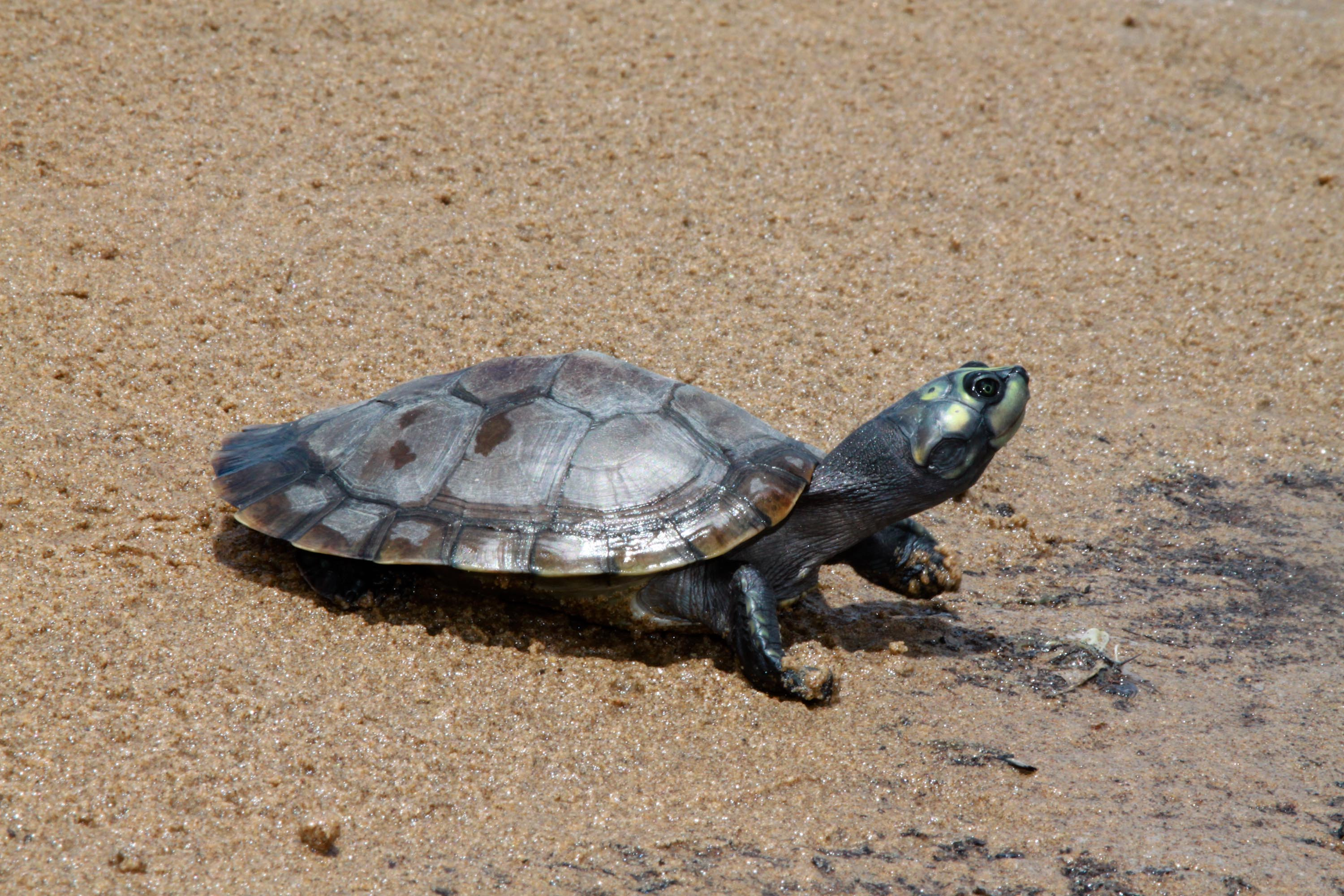
Podocnemis expansa

Order: Testudines · Family: Podocnemididae

- Podocnemis expansa (Schweigger, 1812)
- Podocnemis unifilis Troschel, 1848 VU

=== Testudinidae ===
Order: Testudines · Family: Testudinidae

- Chelonoidis carbonarius (Spix, 1824)
- Chelonoidis denticulatus (Linnaeus, 1766)

== Crocodilians (Crocodylia) ==
=== Alligatoridae ===
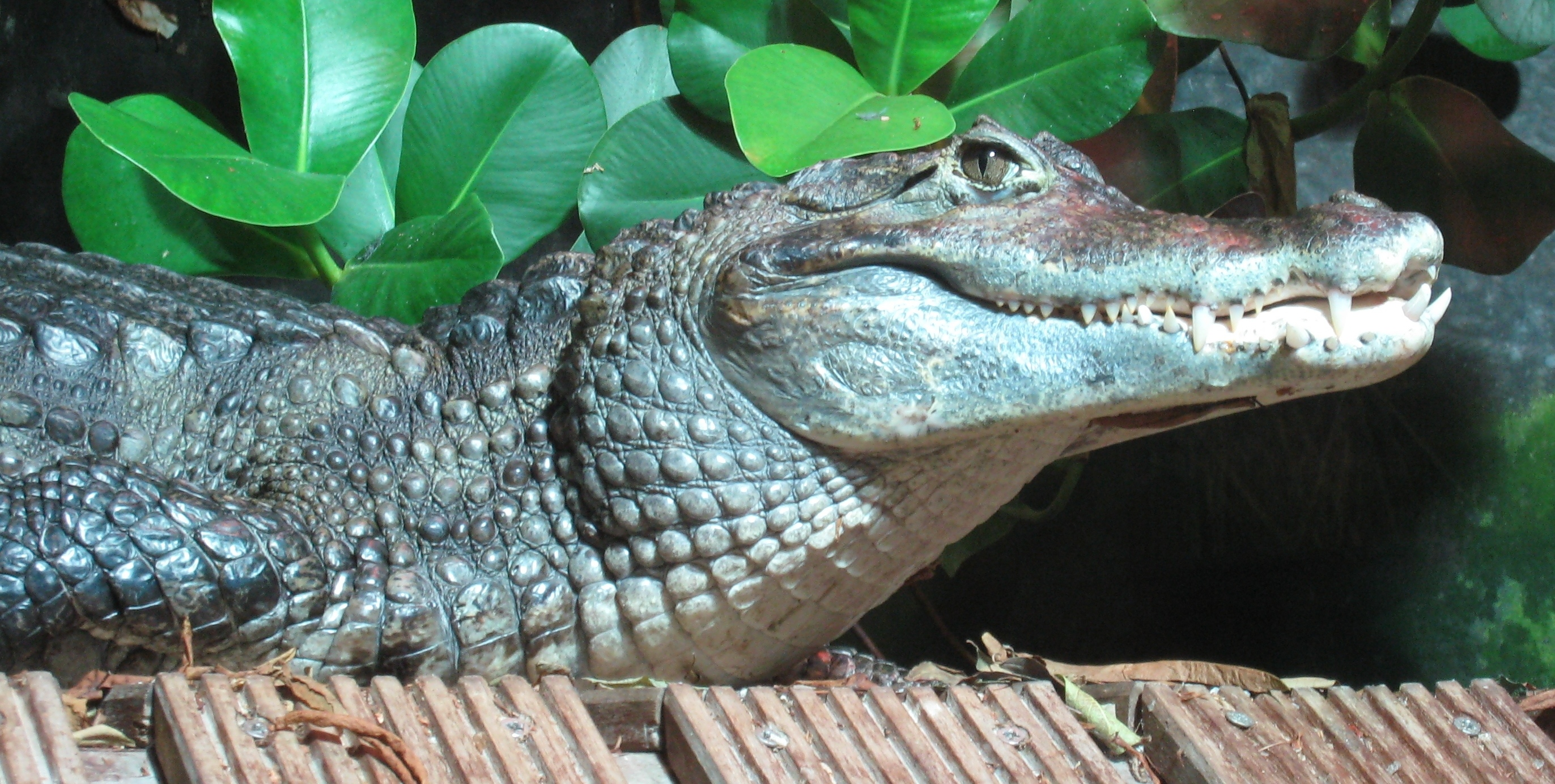
Caiman crocodilus

Order: Crocodylia · Family: Alligatoridae

The alligatoridae (Alligatoridae) are a family of crocodilian sauropsids (reptiles) native to the Americas, including alligators and caimans. It includes the extant genera Alligator, Caiman, Melanosuchus and Paleosuchus, as well as numerous extinct genera. Of the 7 species that inhabit America, 2 occur in Trinidad.

- Caiman crocodilus (Linnaeus, 1758)
- Paleosuchus palpebrosus (Cuvier, 1807)

=== Crocodylidae ===
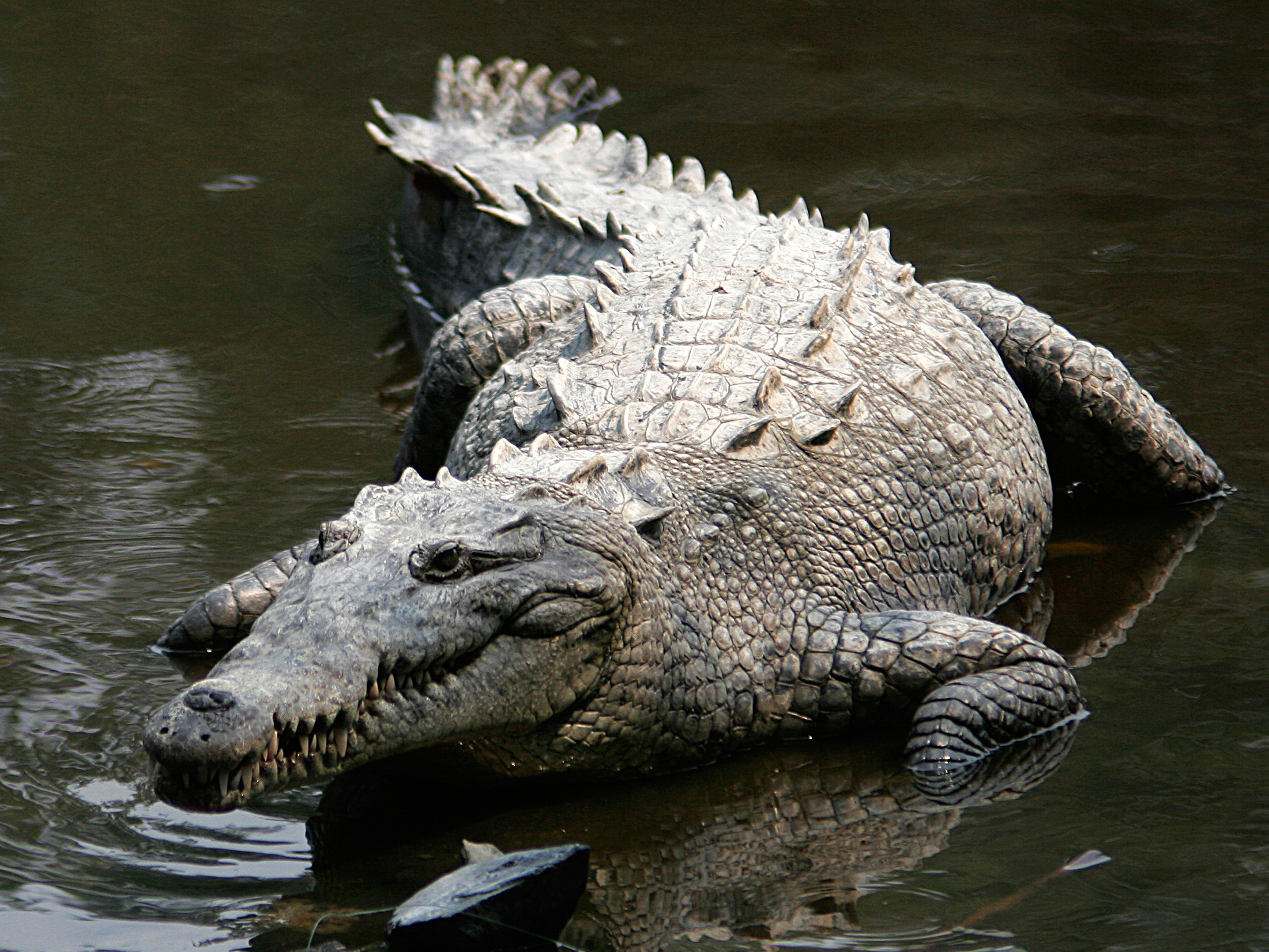
Crocodylus acutus

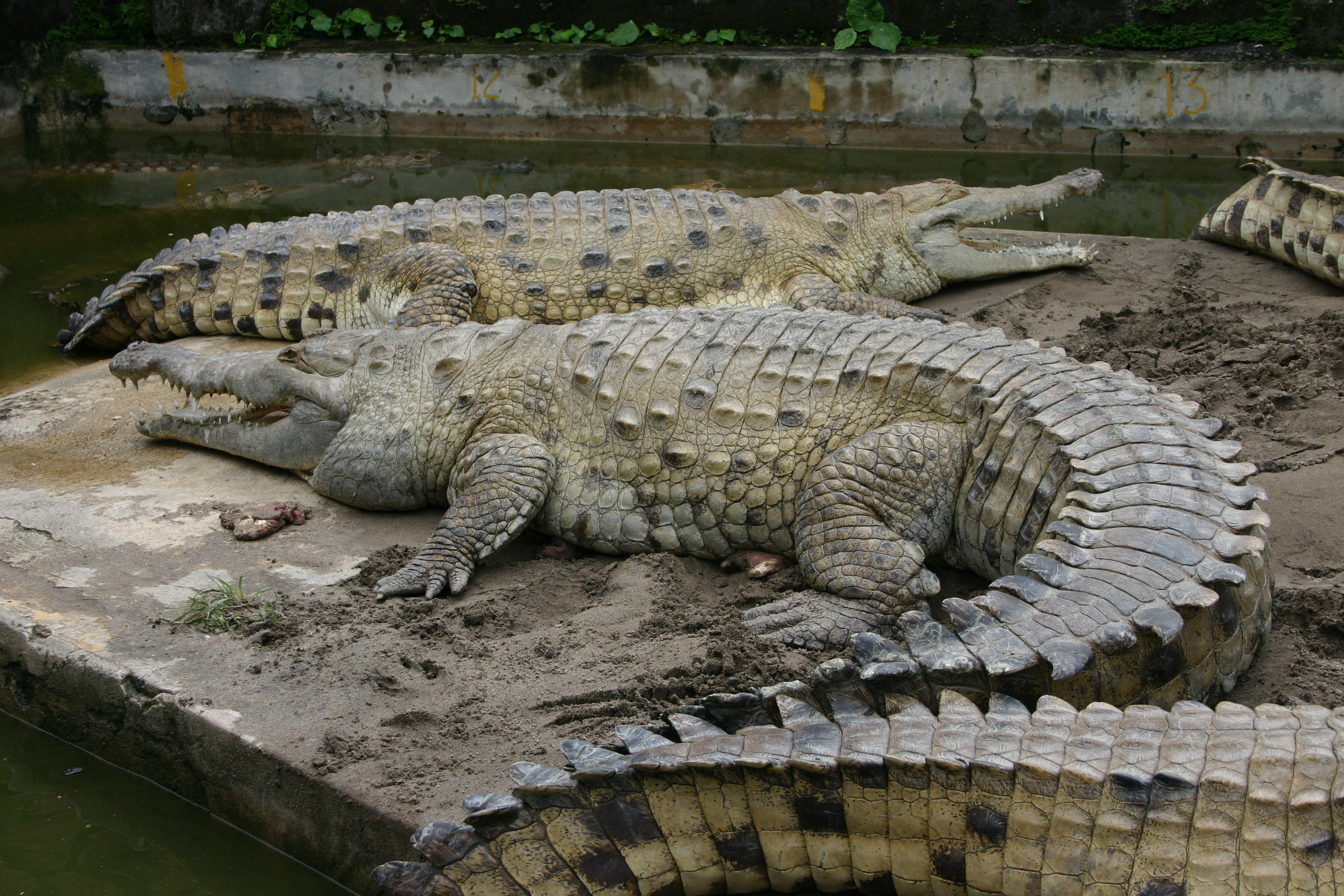
Crocodylus intermedius

Order: Crocodylia · Family: Crocodylidae

Crocodilians (Crocodylidae) are a family of archosaur sauropsids (reptiles) commonly known as crocodiles. This family includes 14 species of large semi-aquatic reptiles that inhabit tropical areas of the world. Crocodiles tend to congregate in freshwater habitats, such as rivers, lakes, wetlands, and sometimes brackish water. They are ambush hunters who usually wait for their prey, generally fish or land animals, to approach, before attacking them. They feed mainly on vertebrates such as fish, reptiles and mammals, and sometimes invertebrates such as mollusks and crustaceans, depending on the species. As cold-blooded predators, they have a slow metabolism and can therefore survive long periods without food. Despite their slow appearance, crocodiles are very fast over short distances, even out of water. However, these 2 species are considered waifs to the island. Meaning, that Trinidad and Tobago is not in their natural distribution. With these two species likely coming in from the surrounding waterways of Venezuela.

- Crocodylus acutus (Cuvier, 1807) VU
- Crocodylus intermedius (Graves, 1819) CR

== Lizards (Squamata - suborder Lacertilia) ==
In Trinidad, 49 species of lizards were recorded, which are grouped into 11 families.

=== Amphisbaenidae ===
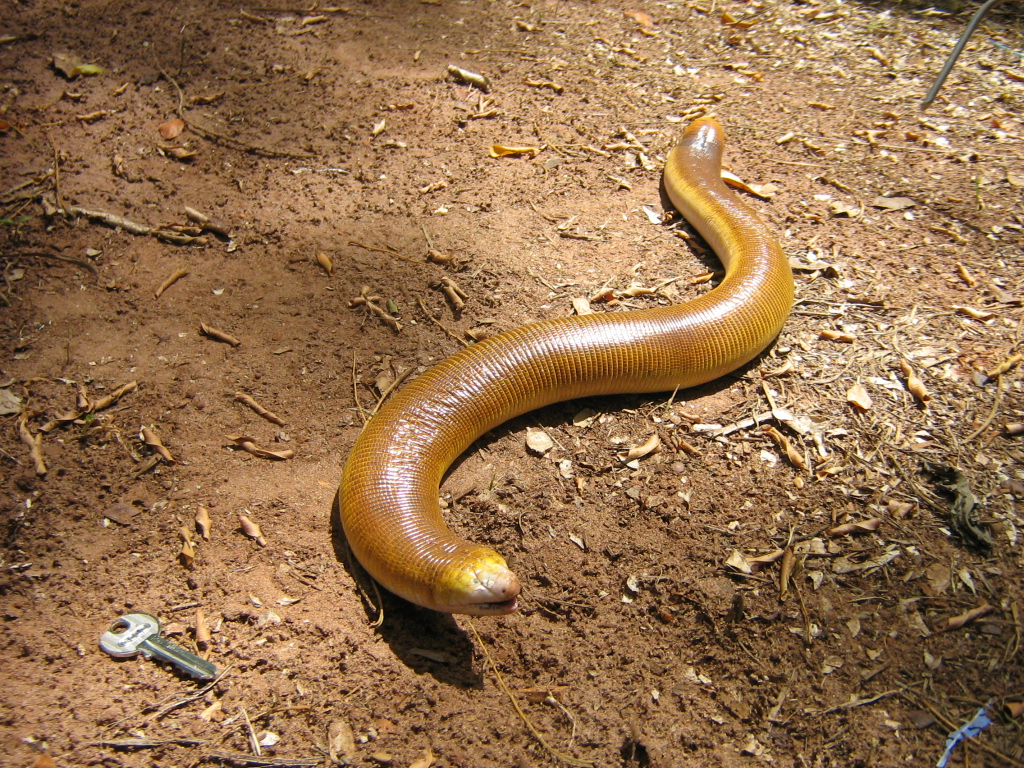
Amphisbaena alba

Order: Squamata · Family: Amphisbaenidae

- Amphisbaena alba Linnaeus, 1758
- Amphisbaena fuliginosa Linnaeus, 1758
- Amphisbaena varia Laurenti, 1768

=== Dactyloidae ===
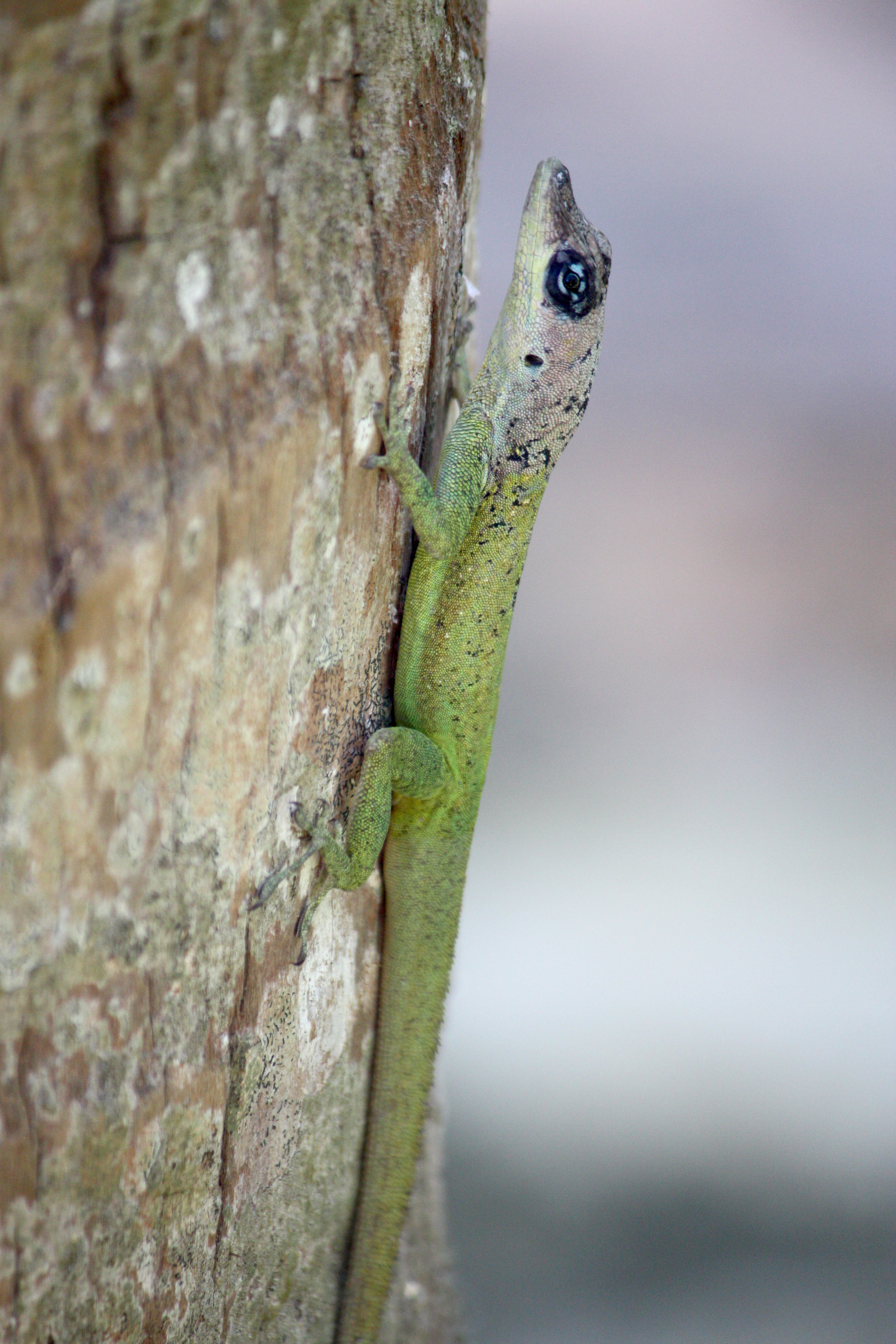
Anolis extremus

Order: Squamata · Family: Dactyloidae

- Anolis aeneus Gray, 1840
- Anolis ahli Barbour, 1925
- Anolis alutaceus Cope, 1861
- Anolis delafuentei Garrido, 1982
- Anolis extremus Garman, 1887
- Anolis gingivinus Cope, 1864
- Anolis guamuhaya (Garrido, Pérez-Beato & Moreno, 1991)
- Anolis planiceps Troschel, 1848
- Anolis rejectus Garrido & Schwartz, 1972
- Anolis trinitatis Reinhardt & Lütken, 1862
- Anolis vanidicus Garrido & Schwartz, 1972
- Anolis wattsi Boulenger, 1894

=== Gekkonidae ===
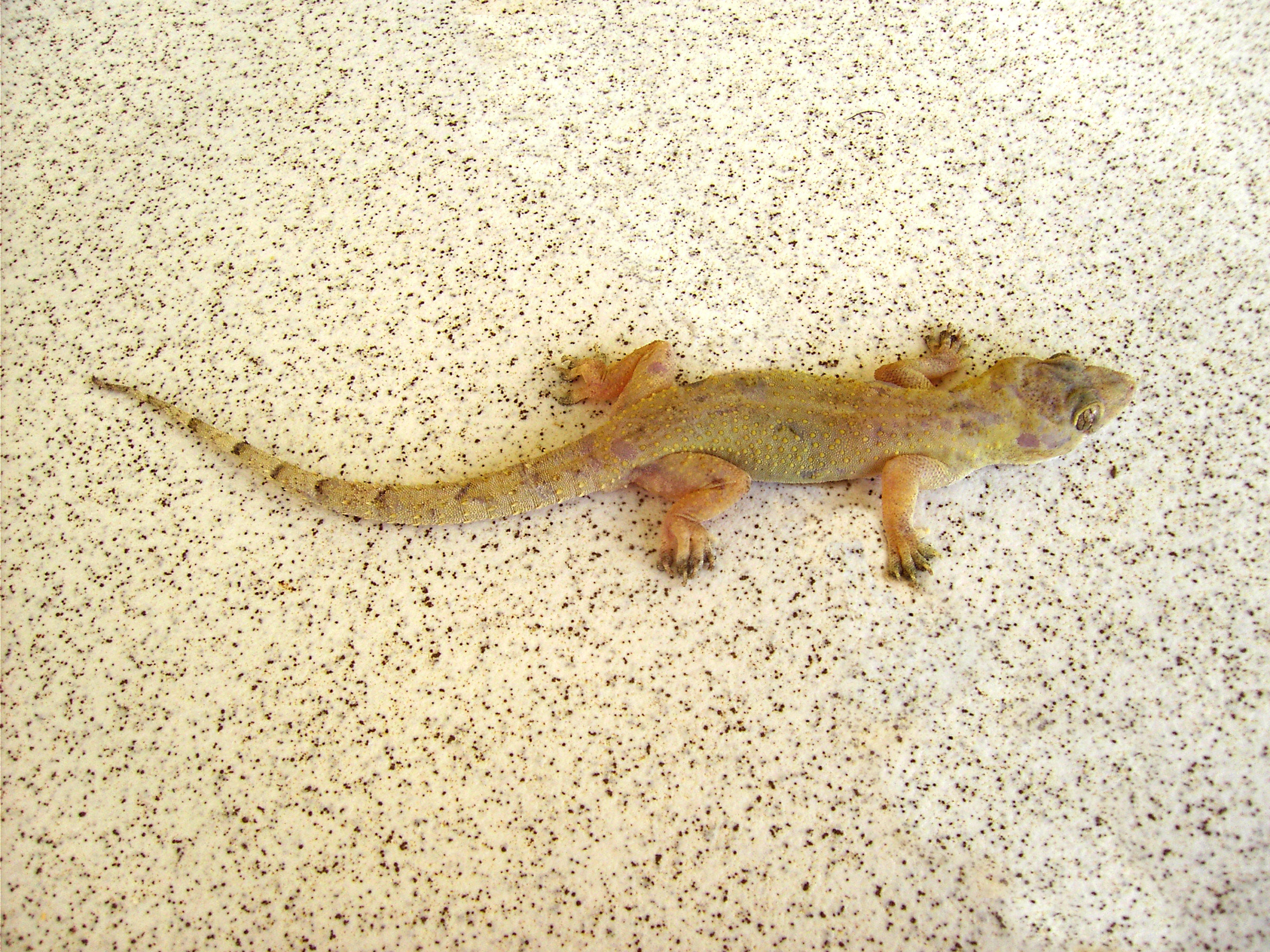
Hemidactylus mabouia

Order: Squamata · Family: Gekkonidae

- Gekko carusadensis Linkem, Siler, Diesmos, Sy & Brown, 2010
- Hemidactylus brookii Gray, 1845
- Hemidactylus mabouia (Moreau de Jonnés, 1818)
- Hemidactylus palaichthus Kluge, 1969

=== Gymnophthalmidae ===
Order: Squamata · Family: Gymnophthalmidae

- Bachia heteropa (Wiegmann, 1856)
- Gymnophthalmus underwoodi Grant, 1958
- Riama shrevei (Parker, 1935)

=== Iguanidae ===
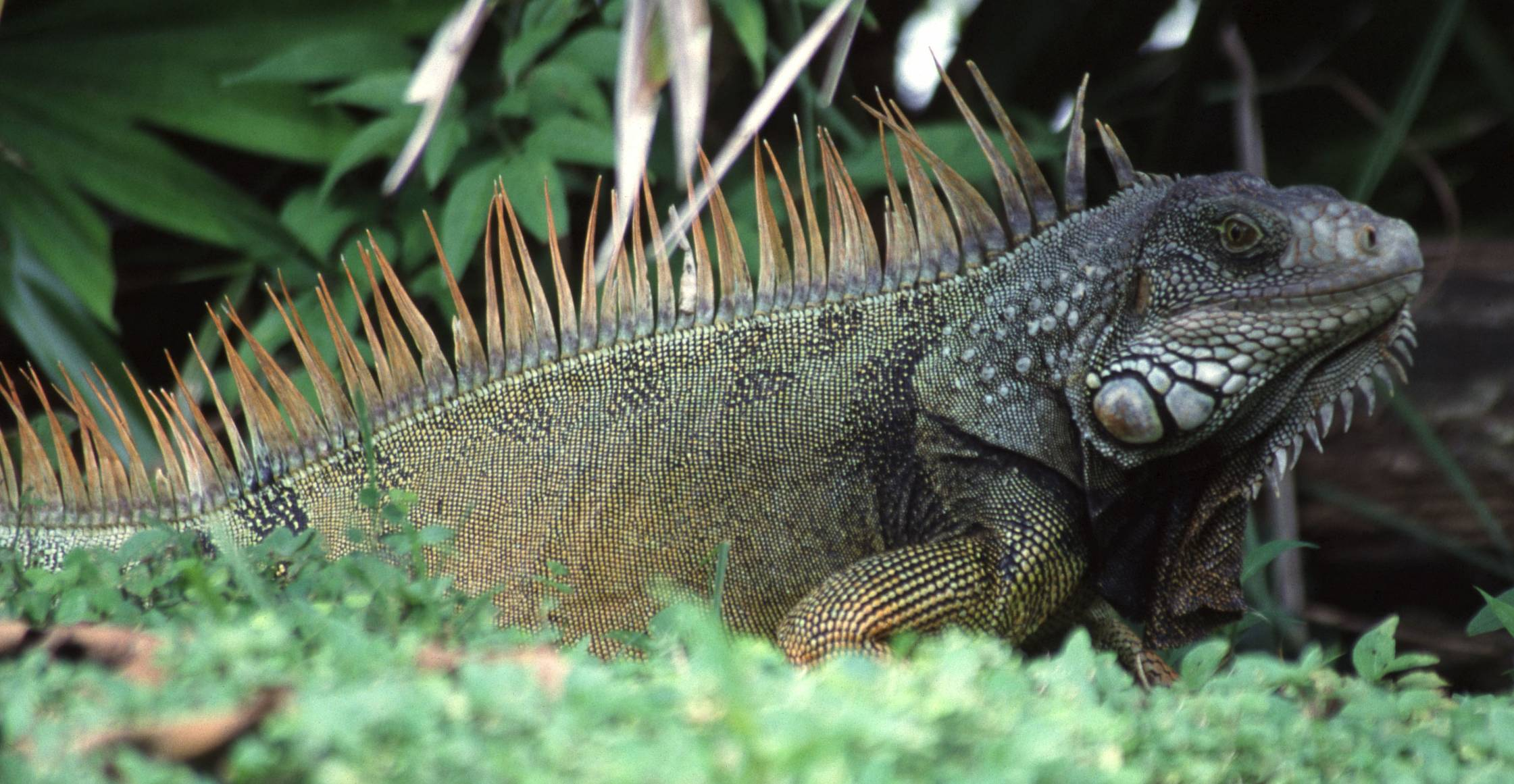
Iguana iguana

Order: Squamata · Family: Iguanidae

- Iguana iguana (Linnaeus, 1758)

=== Phyllodactylidae ===
Order: Squamata · Family: Phyllodactylidae

- Gymnodactylus geckoides Spix, 1825
- Thecadactylus rapicauda (Houttuyn, 1782)

=== Scincidae ===
Order: Squamata · Family: Scincidae

- Copeoglossum aurae Hedges & Conn, 2012
- Copeoglossum nigropunctatum (Spix, 1825)
- Varzea bistriata (Spix, 1825)

=== Sphaerodactylidae ===
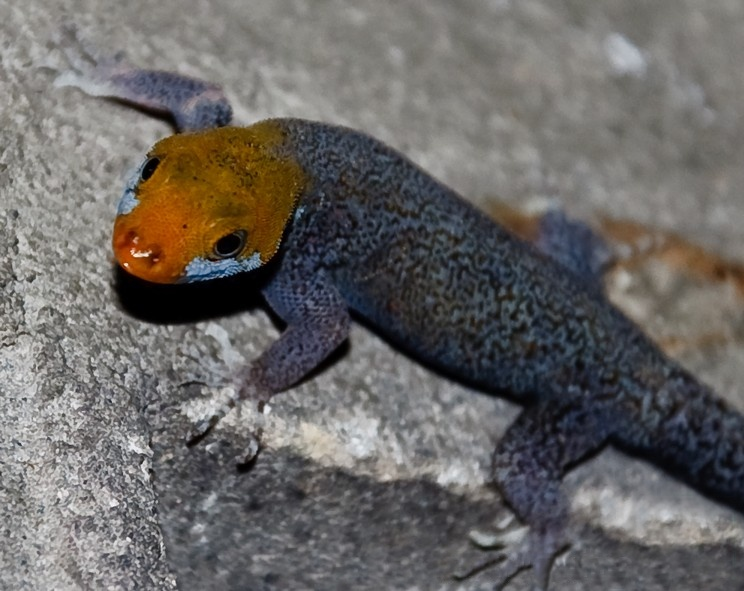
Gonatodes albogularis

Order: Squamata · Family: Sphaerodactylidae

- Gonatodes albogularis (Duméril & Bibron, 1836)
- Gonatodes ceciliae Donoso-Barros, 1966
- Gonatodes ferrugineus (Cope, 1864 [resurrected from synonymy by Pinto et al. 2019])
- Gonatodes vittatus (Lichtenstein, 1856)
- Sphaerodactylus molei Boettger, 1894

=== Teiidae ===
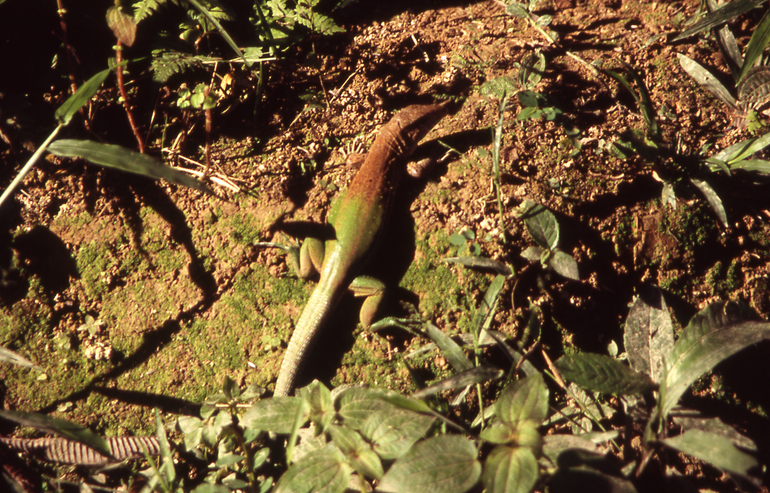
Ameiva ameiva

Order: Squamata · Family: Teiidae

- Ameiva ameiva (Linnaeus, 1758)
- Ameiva atrigularis Garman, 1887
- Cnemidophorus lemniscatus (Linnaeus, 1758)
- Cnemidophorus murinus (Laurenti, 1768)
- Kentropyx striata (Daudin, 1802)
- Tupinambis teguixin (Linnaeus, 1758)

=== Tropiduridae ===
Order: Squamata · Family: Tropiduridae

- Plica caribeana Murphy & Jowers, 2013

== Snakes (Squamata - suborder Serpentes) ==
Trinidad has 55 species of snakes, grouped into 10 families.

=== Aniliidae ===
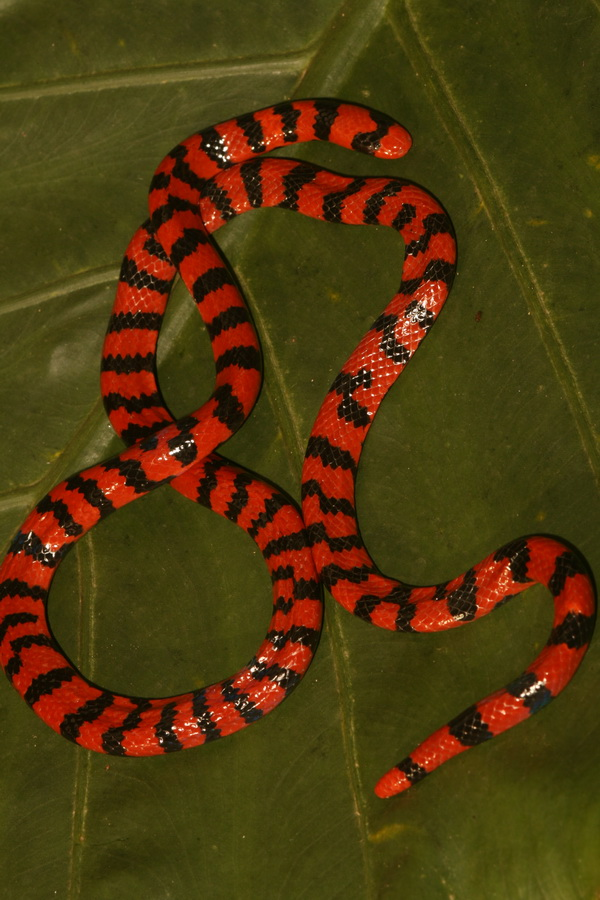
Anilius scytale

Order: Squamata · Family: Aniliidae

- Anilius scytale (Linnaeus, 1758)

=== Anomalepididae ===
Order: Squamata · Family: Anomalepididae

- Typhlophis squamosus (Schlegel, 1839)

=== Colubridae ===
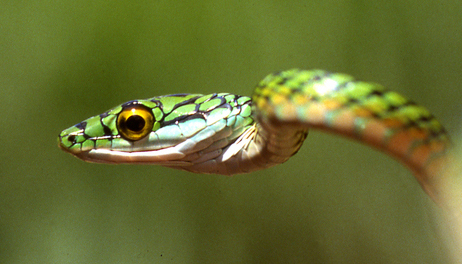
Leptophis ahaetulla

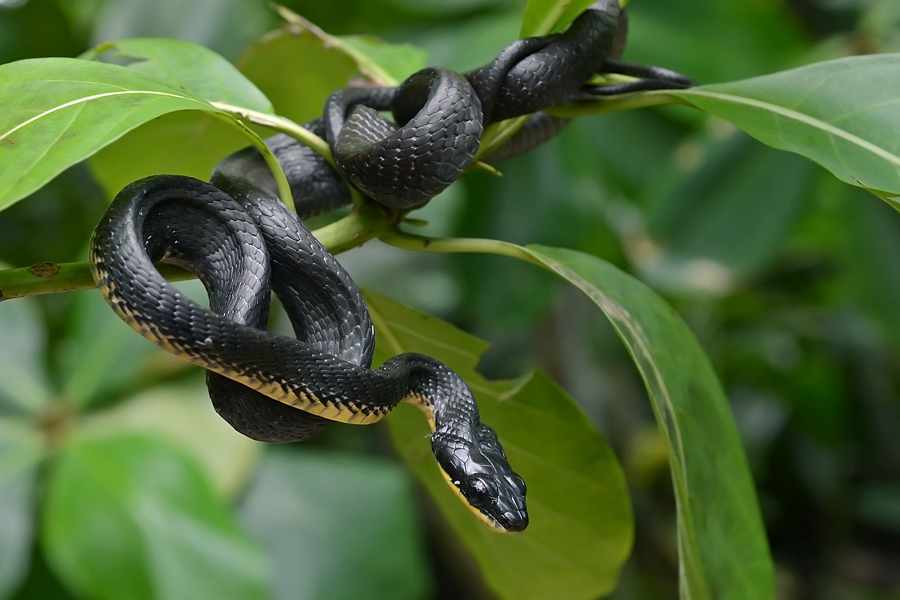
Pseustes poecilonotus

Order: Squamata · Family: Colubridae

- Chironius carinatus (Linnaeus, 1758)
- Chironius scurrulus (Wagler, 1824)
- Chironius septentrionalis Dixon, Wiest & Cei, 1993
- Drymarchon corais (Boie, 1827)
- Leptophis ahaetulla (Linnaeus, 1758)
- Leptophis coeruleodorsus Oliver, 1942
- Leptophis riveti Despax, 1910
- Leptophis stimsoni Harding, 1995
- Mastigodryas amarali (Stuart, 1938)
- Mastigodryas boddaerti (Sentzen, 1796)
- Oxybelis aeneus (Wagler, 1824)
- Pseustes poecilonotus (Günther, 1858)
- Spilotes pullatus (Linnaeus, 1758)
- Spilotes sulphureus (Wagler, 1824)
- Tantilla melanocephala (Linnaeus, 1758)

=== Boidae ===
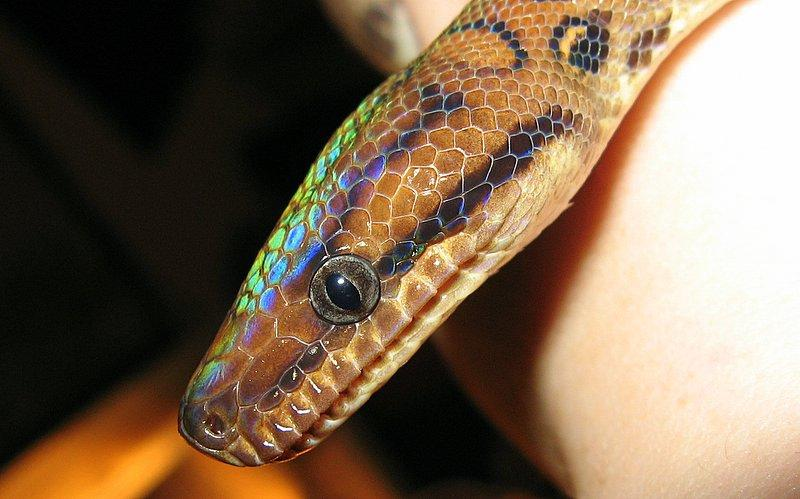
Epicrates cenchria

Order: Squamata · Family: Boidae

- Boa constrictor Linnaeus, 1758
- Corallus hortulanus (Linnaeus, 1758)
- Corallus ruschenbergerii (Cope, 1876)
- Epicrates cenchria (Linnaeus, 1758)
- Epicrates maurus Gray, 1849
- Eunectes beniensis Dirksen, 2002
- Eunectes murinus (Linnaeus, 1758)

=== Dipsadidae ===
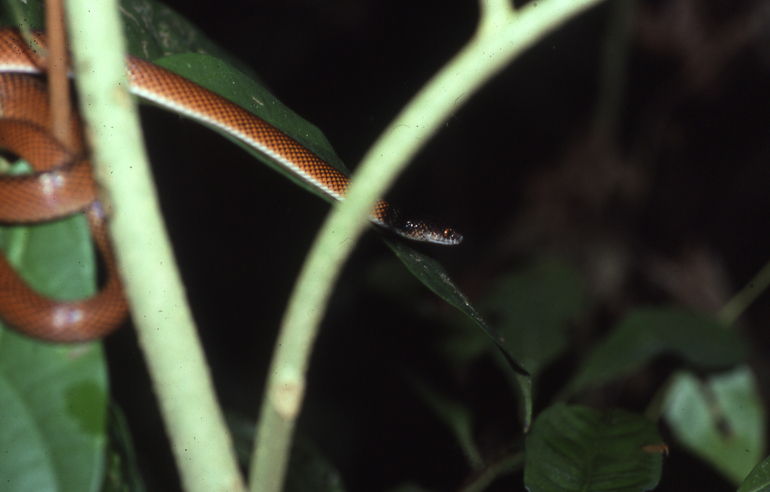
Clelia clelia

Order: Squamata · Family: Dipsadidae

- Atractus trilineatus Wagler, 1828
- Clelia clelia (Daudin, 1803)
- Dipsas variegata (Duméril, Bibron & Duméril, 1854)
- Erythrolamprus aesculapii (Linnaeus, 1758)
- Erythrolamprus bizona Jan, 1863
- Erythrolamprus cobella (Linnaeus, 1758)
- Erythrolamprus melanotus (Shaw, 1802)
- Erythrolamprus reginae (Linnaeus, 1758)
- Helicops angulatus (Linnaeus, 1758)
- Hydrops triangularis (Wagler, 1824)
- Imantodes cenchoa (Linnaeus, 1758)
- Leptodeira annulata (Linnaeus, 1758)
- Ninia atrata (Halowell, 1845)
- Oxyrhopus petolarius (Linnaeus, 1758)
- Pseudoeryx relictualis Schargel, Rivas-Fuenmayor, Barros, Péfaur & Navarette, 2007
- Sibon nebulatus (Linnaeus, 1758)
- Siphlophis cervinus (Laurenti, 1768)
- Siphlophis compressus (Daudin, 1803)

=== Elapidae ===
Order: Squamata · Family: Elapidae

- Micrurus circinalis (Duméril, Bibron & Duméril, 1854)
- Micrurus lemniscatus (Linnaeus, 1758)
- Micrurus psyches (Daudin, 1803)

=== Leptotyphlopidae ===
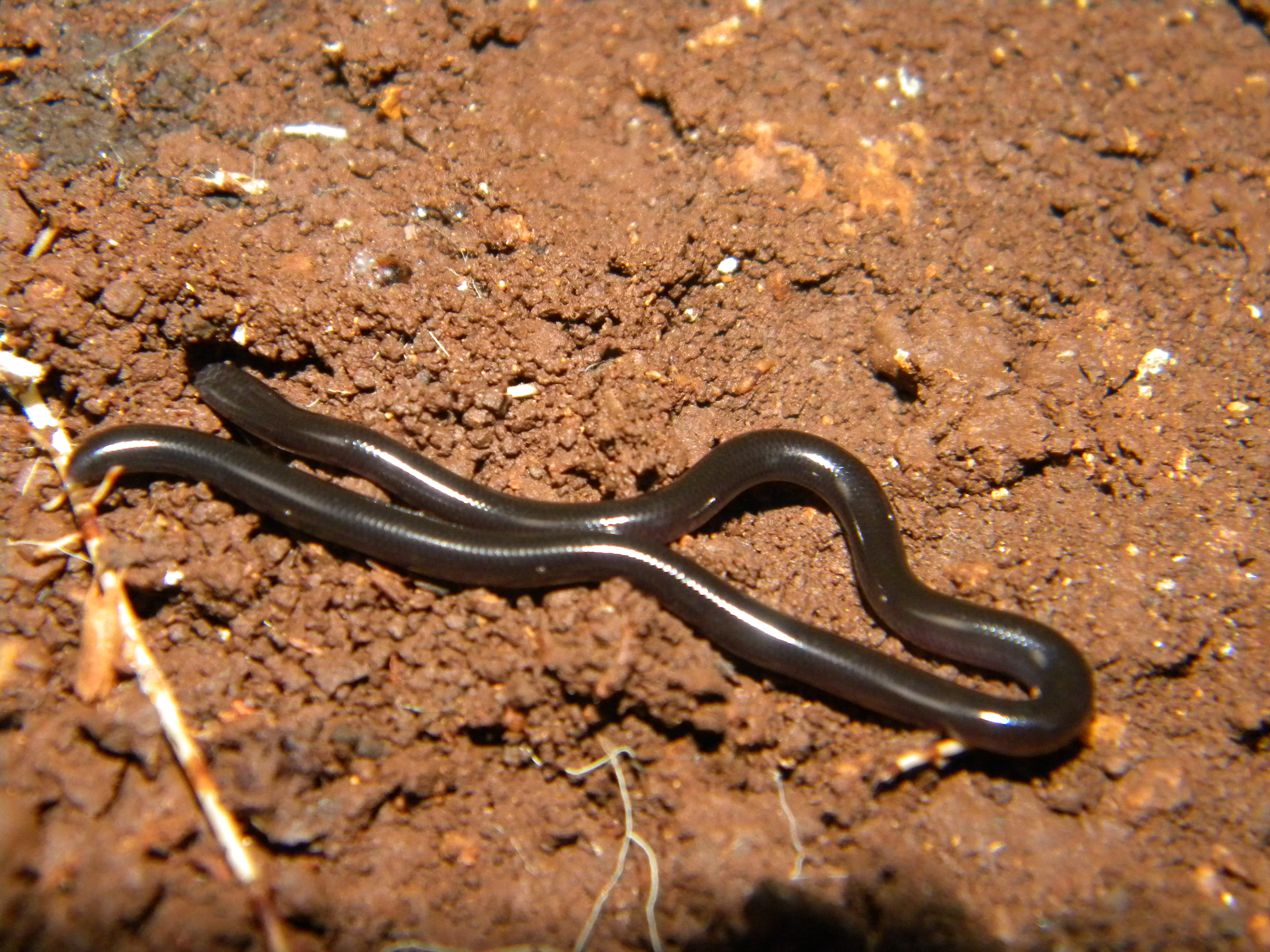
Epictia goudotii

Order: Squamata · Family: Leptotyphlopidae

- Epictia goudotii (Duméril & Bibron, 1844)
- Epictia magnamaculata (Taylor, 1940)
- Epictia tenella (Klauber, 1939)

=== Typhlopidae ===
Order: Squamata · Family: Typhlopidae

- Amerotyphlops brongersmianus (Vanzolini, 1976)
- Amerotyphlops trinitatus (Richmond, 1965)

=== Viperidae ===
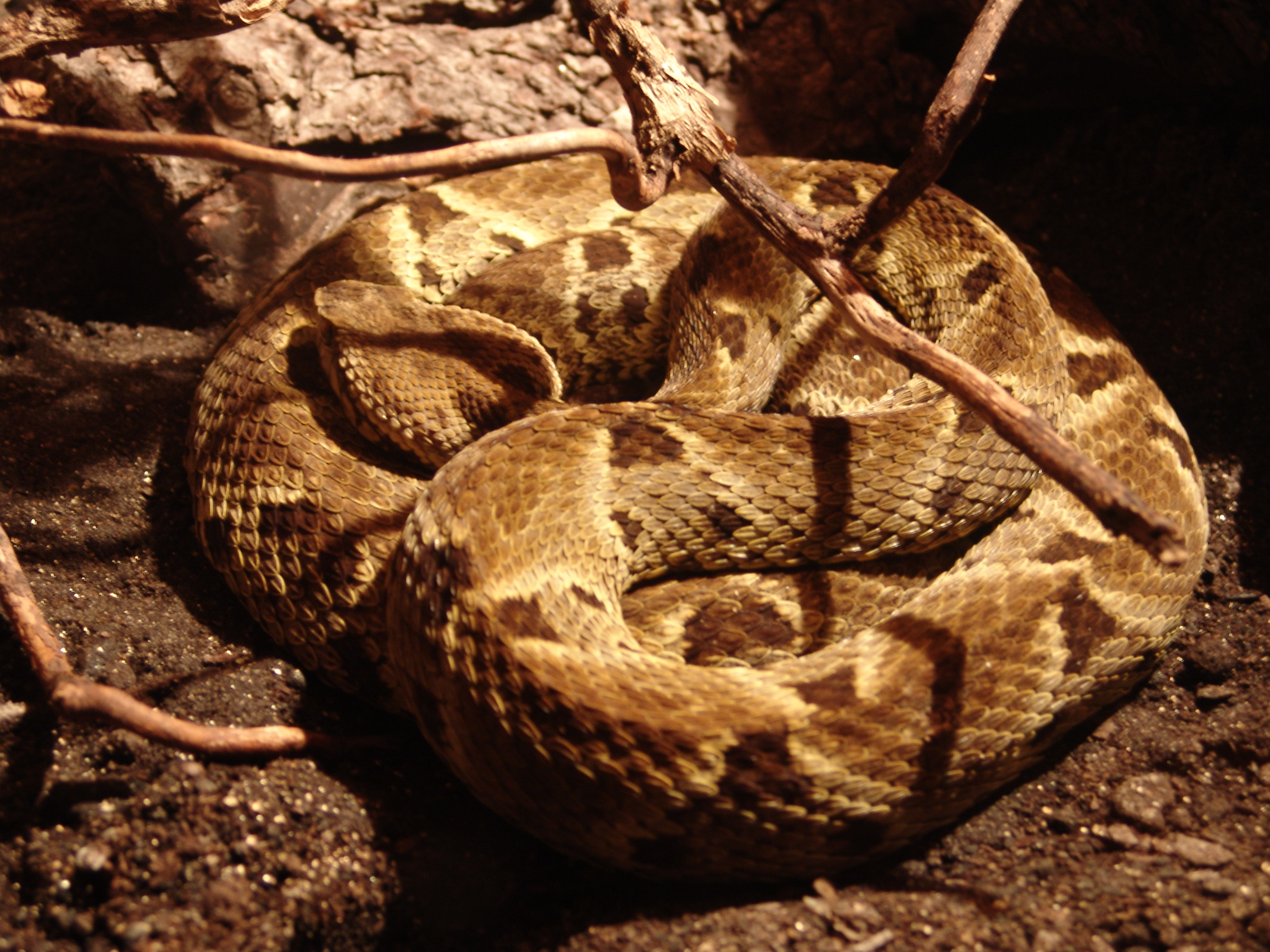
Bothrops atrox

Order: Squamata · Family: Viperidae

- Bothrops atrox (Linnaeus, 1758)
- Lachesis muta (Linnaeus, 1766)
