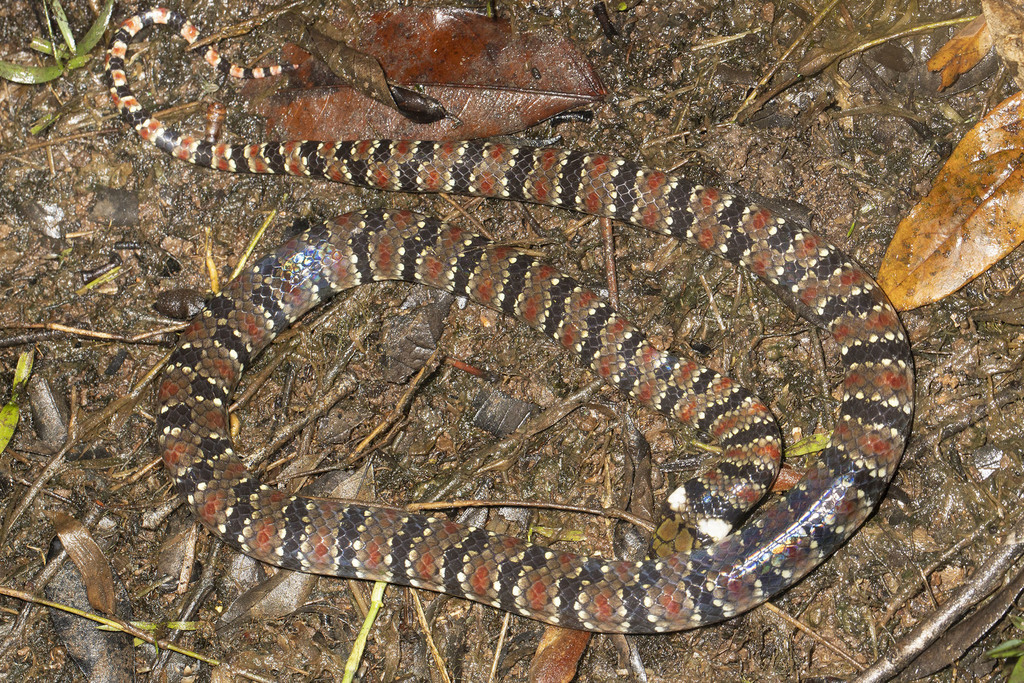

Conservation status
- Least Concern (IUCN 3.1)

Scientific classification
- Kingdom: Animalia
- Phylum: Chordata
- Class: Reptilia
- Order: Squamata
- Suborder: Serpentes
- Family: Colubridae
- Genus: Hydrops
- Species: H. martii

Binomial name
- Hydrops martii (Wagler, 1824)

Synonyms
- Elaps martii Wagler 1824; Calopisma martii (Wagler, 1824); Homalopsis martii (Wagler, 1824); Hydrops triangularis martii (Wagler, 1824); Hydrops callostictus Günther, 1868

= Hydrops martii =

Species of snake

Hydrops martii, also known commonly as the Amazon water snake and cobra d'água in Brazilian Portuguese, is a species of snake belonging to the subfamily Dipsadinae of the family Colubridae. The species is native to northern South America.

== Taxonomy ==
The species, Elaps martii, named after German botanist Carl Friedrich Philipp von Martius (1794–1868), was first described by German herpetologist Johann Georg Wagler in 1824. The species was reassigned to the genus Hydrops by Wagler in 1930.

Elaps martii Wagler, 1824, is the type species of the genus Hydrops Wagler, 1830. Hydrops is the type genus of the tribe Hydropsini Zaher et al., 2009, which consists of the genera Helicops, Hydrops, and Pseudoeryx.

== Description ==
Hydrops martii may attain a total length (tail included) of 1.2 m (3.9 ft). It has smooth dorsal scales, which are arranged in 17 rows at midbody.

== Geographic distribution ==
Hydrops martii is found in Brazil, Colombia, Ecuador, Peru, and Venezuela. In Brazil, this species has been found in the Amazonas, Amapá, Maranhāo, Pará, and Roraima states. H. martii has also been recorded in the Loreto and Ucayali departments of Peru, and has only been documented in the Guainía department of Colombia.

== Habitat ==
The preferred natural habitat of Hydrops martii is floodplains within rainforest, at altitudes from sea level to 300 m (980 ft).

== Behavior ==
The species Hydrops martii spends the majority of its time in small streams, but it is believed that it may come onto land for foraging.

== Biology ==
=== Sexual dimorphism ===
Males of Hydrops martii are reported to be smaller than females.

=== Reproduction ===
The species H. martii is oviparous, and clutch size ranges from 7 to 23 eggs. The breeding season of this species is not well known, but pregnant females have been found by researchers in March, July, September, and October.

=== Diet ===
Hydrops martii has only been reported to eat fish and is therefore is thought to be a fish specialist. Stomach contents of H. martii most commonly contained fish belonging to the orders Gymnotiformes, Synbranchiformes, and Siluriformes. Confirmed fish species include Callichthys callichthys (cascarudo), Pimelodella cristata (commonly referred to as a bagre in Brazil), Hoplias malabaricus (wolf fish), and Erythrinus erythrinus (red wolf fish). The family Synbranchidae, consisting of swamp eels, has also been found in its diet.

Foraging is normally done during the evening and night, following the activity of its prey.

=== As prey ===
H. martii has been found in the stomach of Serrasalmus rhombeus (redeye piranha) and has also been reported to be eaten by Micrurus lemniscatus (South American coral snake), caimans, and aquatic fishes and snakes.

=== Defensive behavior ===
Defensive behavior has not yet been reported in H. martii.
