= Copeoglossum arajara =

Conservation status
- Least Concern (IUCN 3.1)

Scientific classification
- Kingdom: Animalia
- Phylum: Chordata
- Class: Reptilia
- Order: Squamata
- Suborder: Scinciformata
- Infraorder: Scincomorpha
- Family: Mabuyidae
- Genus: Copeoglossum
- Species: C. arajara

Binomial name
- Copeoglossum arajara (Rebouças-Spieker, 1981)

Species of lizard

Copeoglossum arajara, the Arajara mabuya, is a species of skink found in Brazil.
