= Hydrops caesurus =

Conservation status
- Least Concern (IUCN 3.1)

Scientific classification
- Kingdom: Animalia
- Phylum: Chordata
- Class: Reptilia
- Order: Squamata
- Suborder: Serpentes
- Family: Colubridae
- Genus: Hydrops
- Species: H. caesurus

Binomial name
- Hydrops caesurus Scrocchi, Ferreira, Giraudo, Ávila & Motte, 2005

Species of snake

Hydrops caesurus is a species of snake in the subfamily Dipsadinae of the family Colubridae. The species is native to central South America.

== Description ==
Unlike other species in its genus, Hydrops caesurus does not have dark rings that are complete across its dorsum, but instead it has dark dorsal spots. It has a cream-colored spot on the sixth upper labial. Its dorsal scales are arranged in 15 rows at midbody.

== Geographic distribution ==
Hydrops caesurus is found in Argentina, Brazil, and Paraguay.

== Habitat ==
The preferred natural habitat of Hydrops caesurus is freshwater wetlands.

== Behavior ==
Hydrops caesurus is aquatic, and can be found in both flowing and still waters.

== Reproduction ==
Hydrops caesurus is oviparous.
