= Varzea altamazonica =

Scientific classification
- Kingdom: Animalia
- Phylum: Chordata
- Class: Reptilia
- Order: Squamata
- Family: Scincidae
- Genus: Varzea
- Species: V. altamazonica

Binomial name
- Varzea altamazonica (Miralles, Barrio-Amoros, Rivas, & Chaparro-Auza, 2006)

Species of lizard

Varzea altamazonica is a species of skink found in Peru and Bolivia.
