= Copeoglossum margaritae =

Conservation status
- Data Deficient (IUCN 3.1)

Scientific classification
- Kingdom: Animalia
- Phylum: Chordata
- Class: Reptilia
- Order: Squamata
- Family: Scincidae
- Genus: Copeoglossum
- Species: C. margaritae

Binomial name
- Copeoglossum margaritae Hedges & Conn, 2012

Species of lizard

Copeoglossum margaritae, the Margarita skink, is a species of skink found on Margarita Island in Venezuela.
