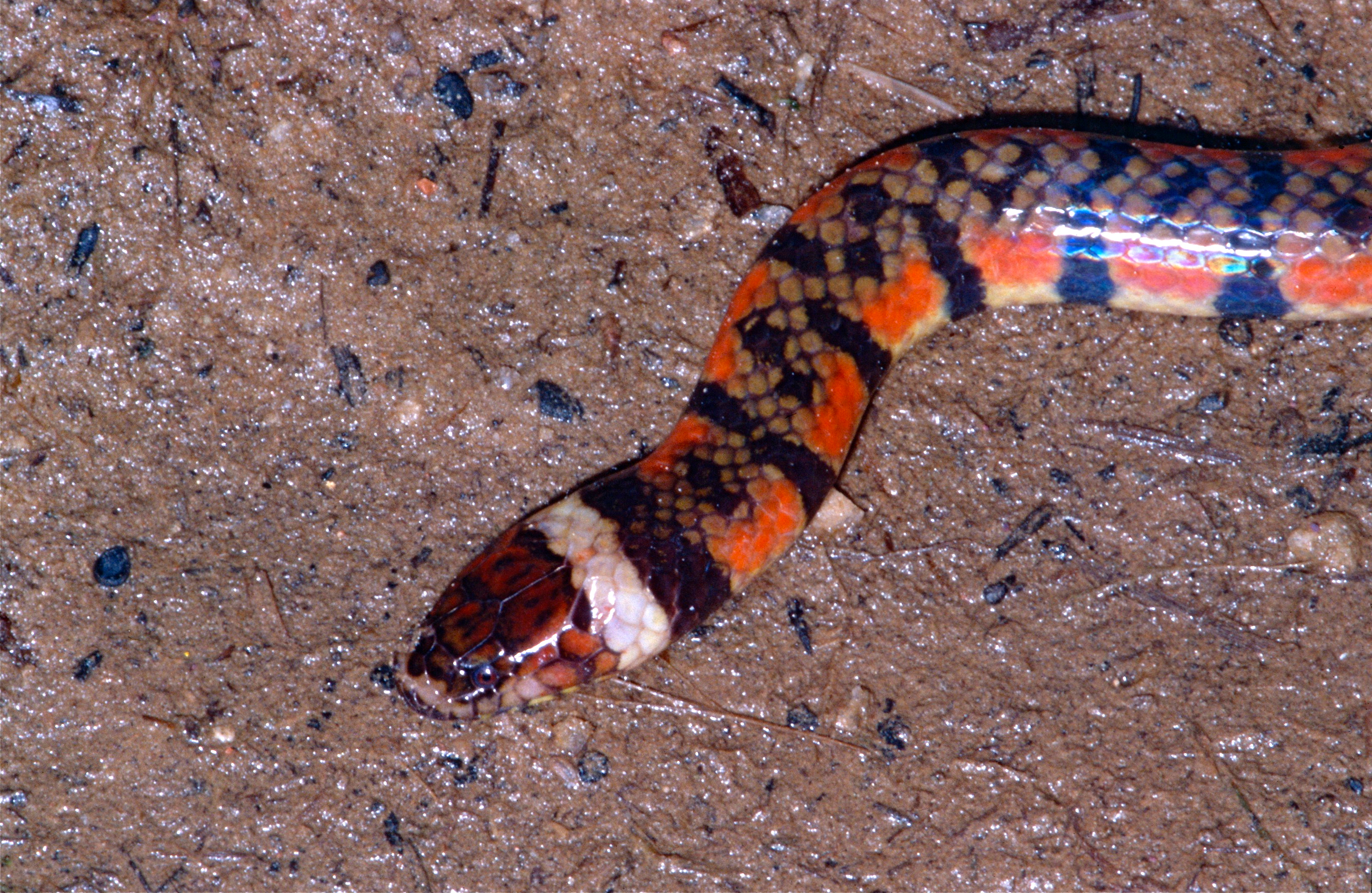
- Triangle water snake (Hydrops triangularis)

Scientific classification
- Kingdom: Animalia
- Phylum: Chordata
- Class: Reptilia
- Order: Squamata
- Suborder: Serpentes
- Family: Colubridae
- Subfamily: Dipsadinae
- Genus: Hydrops; Wagler, 1830

= Hydrops (snake) =

Genus of snakes

Hydrops is a genus of snake in the subfamily Dipsadinae of the family Colubridae. The genus is endemic to South America.

== Species ==
Three species are recognized.

- Hydrops caesurus Scrocchi, Ferreira, Giraudo, Ávila & Motte, 2005
- Hydrops martii (Wagler, 1824) – Amazon water snake
- Hydrops triangularis (Wagler, 1824) – triangle water snake

Nota bene: A binomial authority in parentheses indicates that the species was originally described in a genus other than Hydrops.
