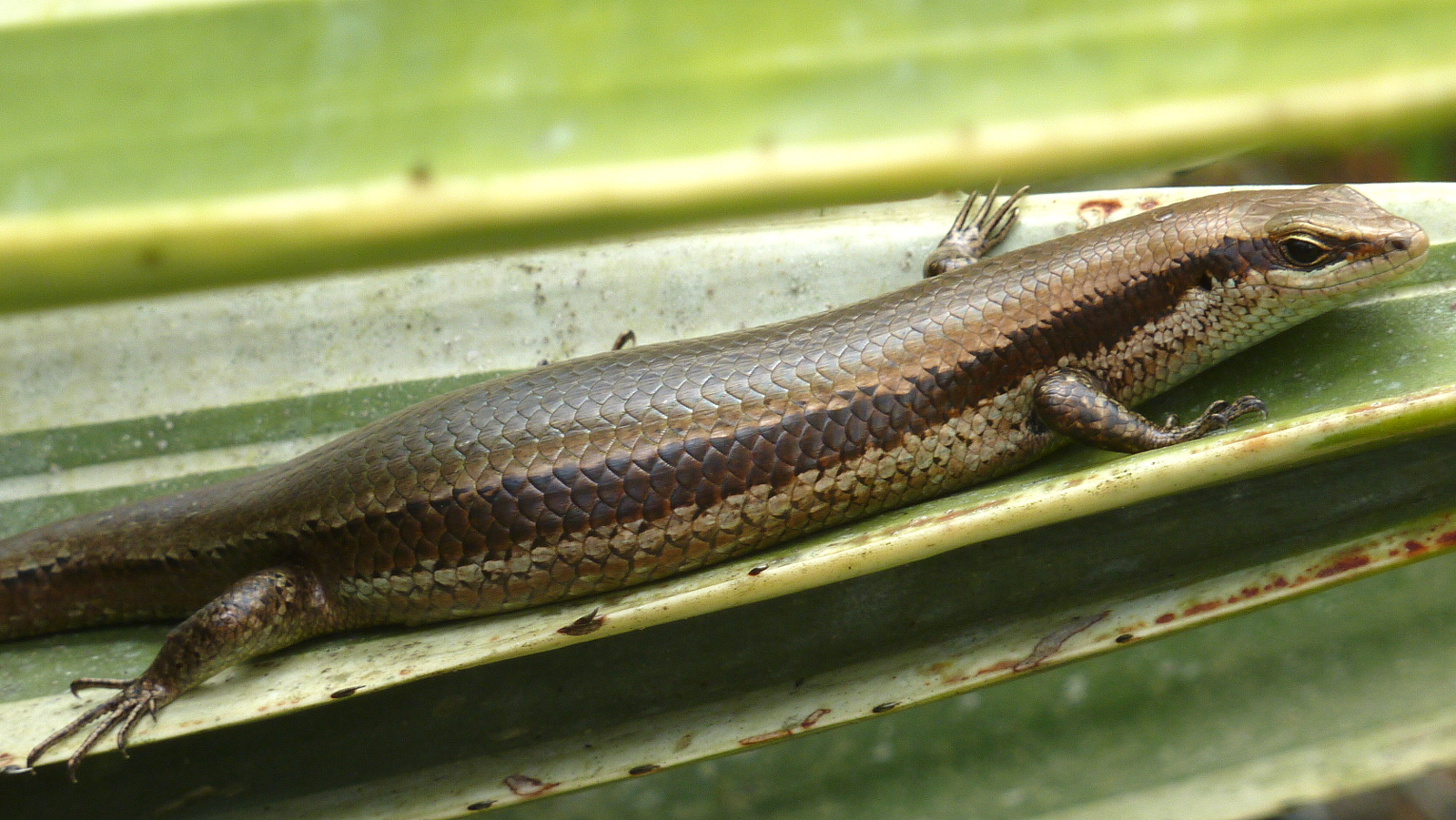
- Copeoglossum nigropunctatum

Scientific classification
- Kingdom: Animalia
- Phylum: Chordata
- Class: Reptilia
- Order: Squamata
- Family: Scincidae
- Subfamily: Mabuyinae
- Genus: Copeoglossum; Tschudi, 1845

Type species
- Copeoglossum cinctum Tschudi 1845

Species
- 5 species (see text)

= Copeoglossum =

Genus of lizards

Copeoglossum, also known as the Neotropical spotted skinks, is a genus of skinks. They were previously placed in the genus Mabuya.

== Taxonomy ==
The genus Copeoglossum was first erected by the Swiss naturalist Johann Jakob von Tschudi in 1845 for the species Copeoglossum cinctum, which was later synonymized with Mabuya nigropunctata, described by the German biologist Johann Baptist von Spix two decades earlier in 1825. The genus name is from the Greek kopeus (chisel) and glossa (tongue), referring to the tongue's shape.

The taxonomy of the genus is highly uncertain, with Copeoglossum nigropunctatum showing high levels of genetic variation and forming a species complex that is synonymous with the genus as a whole. The genus can be divided into three clades: the "Occidental clade" formed by the Caribbean and western (from Colombia east to Amazonas) populations of the species, the "Meridional clade" of southern Brazil, and the "Oriental clade" formed by the remaining populations from Brazil. There are estimated to be at least 14 species of skinks in the genus, of which only five have been formally described.

The following five species, listed alphabetically by specific name, are recognized as being valid:

- Copeoglossum arajara (Reboucas-Spieker, 1981) – Arajara mabuya
- Copeoglossum aurae Hedges & Conn, 2012 – Greater Windward skink
- Copeoglossum margaritae Hedges & Conn, 2012 – Margarita skink
- Copeoglossum nigropunctatum (Spix, 1825) – Black-spotted skink
- Copeoglossum redondae Hedges & Conn, 2012 – Redonda skink (extinct)

Nota bene: A binomial authority in parentheses indicates that the species was originally described in a genus other than Copeoglossum.

== Description ==
Copeoglossum species are large skinks, with snout–vent lengths of 91–121 mm. They can be distinguished from other skinks by the presence of a dark stripe along the sides and the lack of dark stripes down the back and belly, as well as their scalation. They have two frontoparietals, three to six supraciliaries, three or four supraoculars, one or no row of nuchal scales, separated prefrontal scales, and 196–253 lamellae. The most important distinguishing characteristic is the combination of 105–120 dorsal and ventral scales alongside the complete absence of contact between the parietal scales.

== Distribution ==
The genus is native to South America and the Caribbean, with a fairly large distribution centered around the Amazon Basin. In South America, it is found from Colombia east through Venezuela and the Guianas to most of Brazil, and south to Ecuador and Peru. It is also known from Margarita Island, Trinidad and Tobago, Saint Vincent and the Grenadines, and Grenada.
