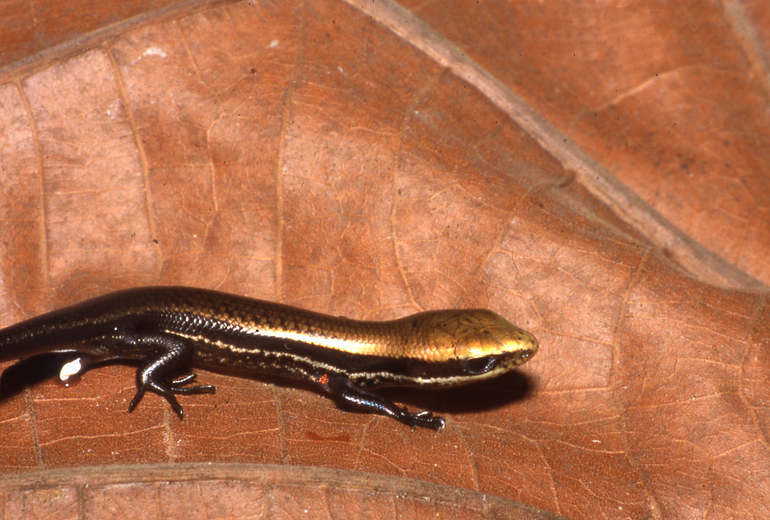
- Varzea bistriata, two-striped mabuya

Scientific classification
- Kingdom: Animalia
- Phylum: Chordata
- Class: Reptilia
- Order: Squamata
- Family: Scincidae
- Subfamily: Mabuyinae
- Genus: Varzea; Hedges & Conn, 2012

Species
- 2 species, see text

= Varzea (lizard) =

Genus of lizards

Varzea is a genus of skinks.

== Species ==
The following 2 species, listed alphabetically by specific name, are recognized as being valid:

- Varzea altamazonica (Miralles, Barrio-amoros, Rivas, Chaparro-Auza, 2006)
- Varzea bistriata (Spix, 1825) – two-striped mabuya

Nota bene: A binomial authority in parentheses indicates that the species was originally described in a genus other than Alinea.
