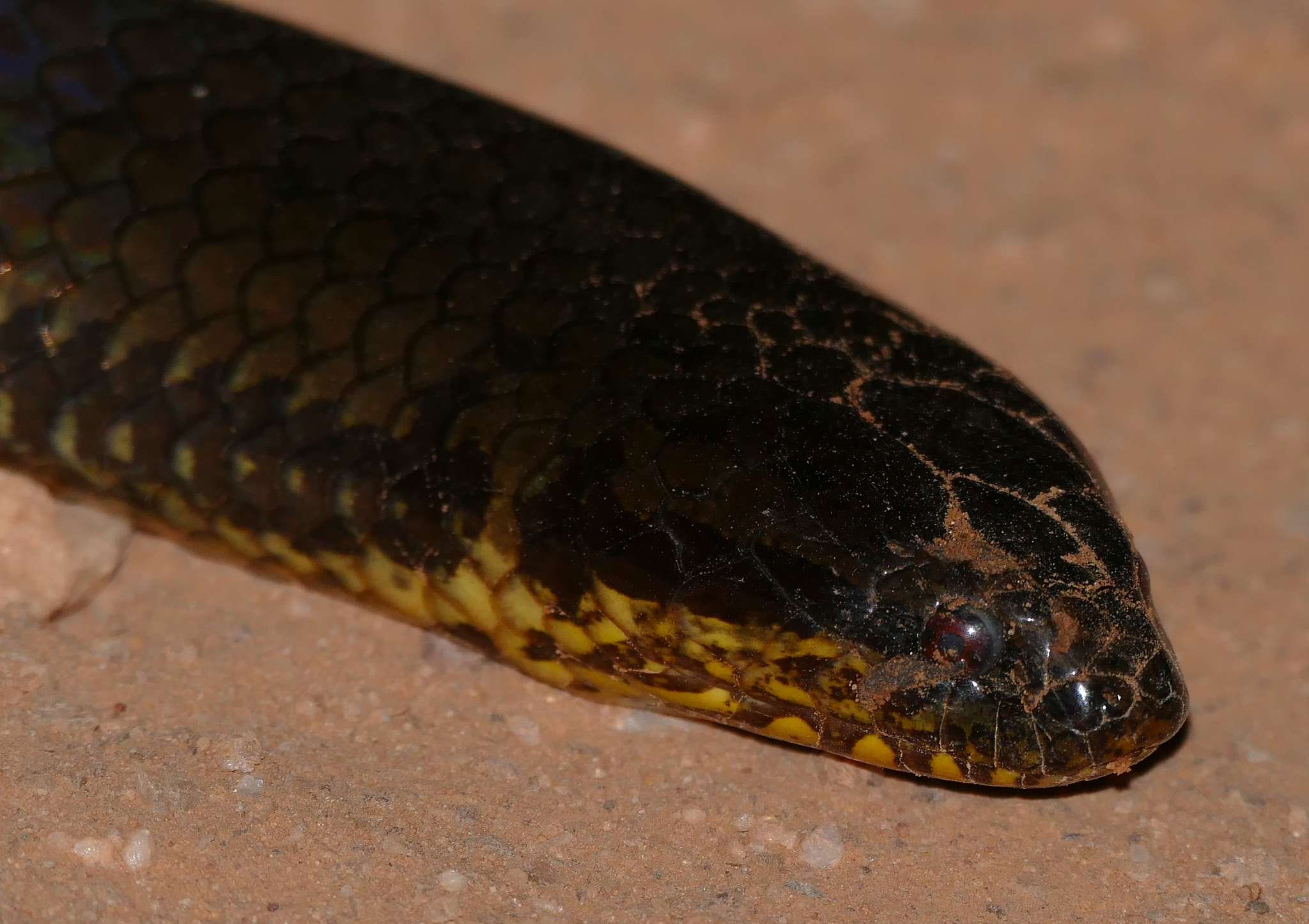
- Adult
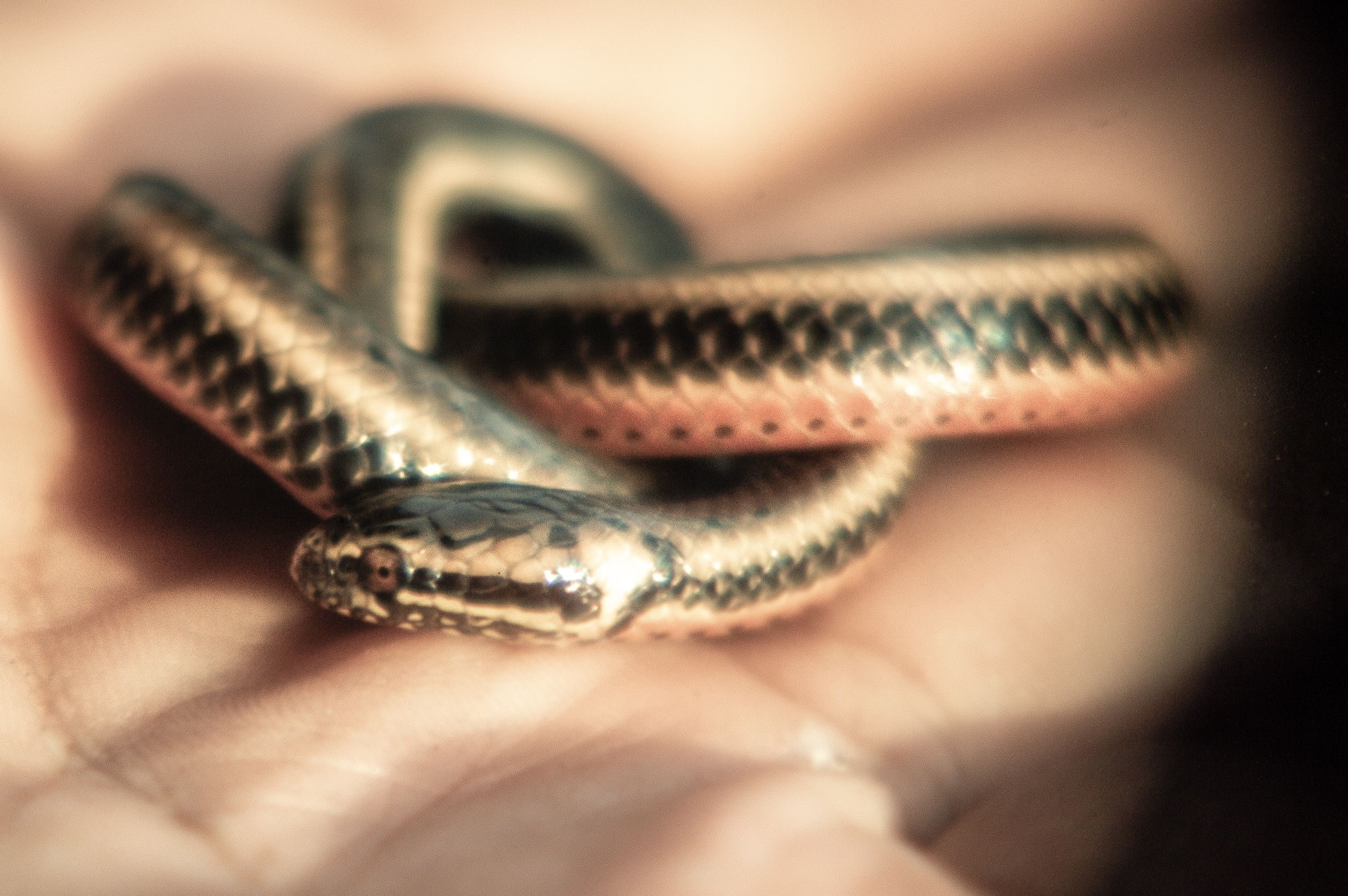
- Juvenile

Conservation status
- Least Concern (IUCN 3.1)

Scientific classification
- Kingdom: Animalia
- Phylum: Chordata
- Class: Reptilia
- Order: Squamata
- Suborder: Serpentes
- Family: Colubridae
- Genus: Pseudoeryx
- Species: P. plicatilis

Binomial name
- Pseudoeryx plicatilis (Linnaeus, 1758)

Synonyms
- List: Coluber plicatilis Linnaeus, 1758: 217; Pseudoeryx plicatilis plicatilis Linnaeus, 1758; Cerastes plicatilis Laurenti, 1768: 81; Elaps plicatilis Schneider, 1801: 294; Natrix plicatilis Merrem, 1820: 99; Pseudoeryx daudinii Fitzinger, 1826: 55; Pseudoeryx plicatilis Fitzinger, 1826: 55; Homalopsis plicatilis Boie, 1827: 523; Helicops plicatilis Wagler, 1830: 171; Pseuderyx plicatilis Fitzinger, 1843: 25 (unjustified emendation); Dimades plicatilis Gray, 1849: 76; Calopisma plicatile Duméril, Bibron & Duméril, 1854: 344; Pseudoeryx plicatilis mimeticus Cope, 1885; Pseudoeryx mimeticus Cope, 1885: 94; Pseudoeryx plicatilis var. anomalepis Bocourt, 1895: 804; Hydrops lehmanni Dunn, 1944: 71 (fide Roze, 1957); Pseudoeryx plicatilis ecuadorensis Mertens, 1965

= Pseudoeryx plicatilis =

Species of snake

Pseudoeryx plicatilis, the South American pond snake, is a species of snake of the family Colubridae. They can reach lengths averaging to 1.27 m (4.2 ft). The body of the snake is flattened more dorsally and has smooth scales. The head is compact and the snake is composed of primarily pale dorsal yellow lines with the scales being mostly olive brown. For adults the ventral side of the snake is yellow with rows of black dots. The juveniles have ventral sides that are bright orange or red with black doted rows.

== Habitat and geographic distribution ==
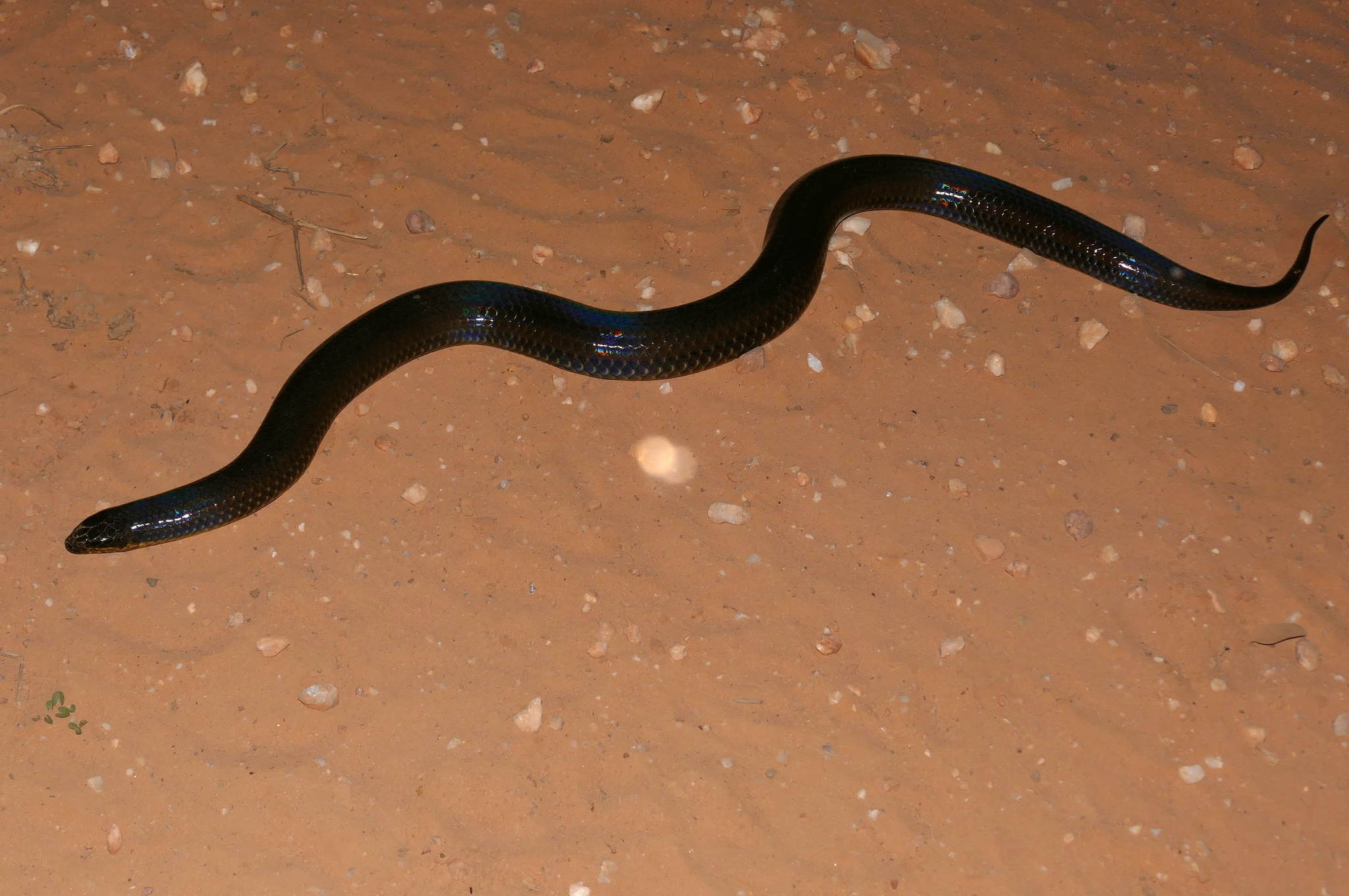
Mato Grosso, Brazil

=== Geographic range ===
The snake is found in Colombia, Venezuela, Ecuador, Peru, Guyana, Suriname, French Guiana, Bolivia, Paraguay, Argentina, and Brazil.

=== Habitat ===
The habitat of Pseudoeryx plicatilis consists of forest, savanna, and inland wetlands. They can be found in black-water rivers, lagoons, ponds, swamps, and oxbow lakes.

== Behavior ==
These snakes are nocturnal and they perform different activities at different depths throughout the night. They have a tendency to forage or perform ambush behavior to attack prey. They are a relatively calm snake and perform many passive defensive behaviors.

=== Defense tactics ===
There remains to be limited knowledge about this species, however, observations of different defensive behaviors have been made. They have been seen hiding their heads and their tails, dorsally-ventrally flattening their full body, making knots out of themselves, turning their ventral region upwards, and moving in drastic erotic ways. Pseudoeryx plicatilis shares defensive traits with other species of water snake including hiding of the head, dorsally-ventrally flattening, and cloacal discharge. Each strategy has its own effect on the predator that is attempting to attack. Erratic movements demonstrate strength and protect the head, cloacal discharge is a deterrent towards the predator, and the tucking of the head and tail implies that predators attack both ends of the animal.

== Biology ==
=== Reproduction ===
Pseudoeryx plicatilis is oviparous. They have a large clutch size ranging from 22 to 49 eggs. The females will protect and guard the eggs until hatching.

=== Diet ===
The diet of Pseudoeryx plicatilis primarily consists of aquatic organisms such as fishes and frogs. They have also been observed eating freshwater eels half the size of their own bodies.

== Taxonomy ==
=== Etymology ===
The genus Pseudoeryx was coined by Fitzinger in 1826. The name Pseudoeryx stems from the Greek word pseudo-, which means false. -eryx is the generic name of the old world sand boas. The species name plicatilis means foldable, from Latin terms. The species is referred to as foldable because of the ventro-lateral fold.

The species was described as Coluber plicatilis by Linnaeus in his 1758 10th edition of Systema Naturae. A second species, Pseudoeryx relictualis, was described in 2007.
