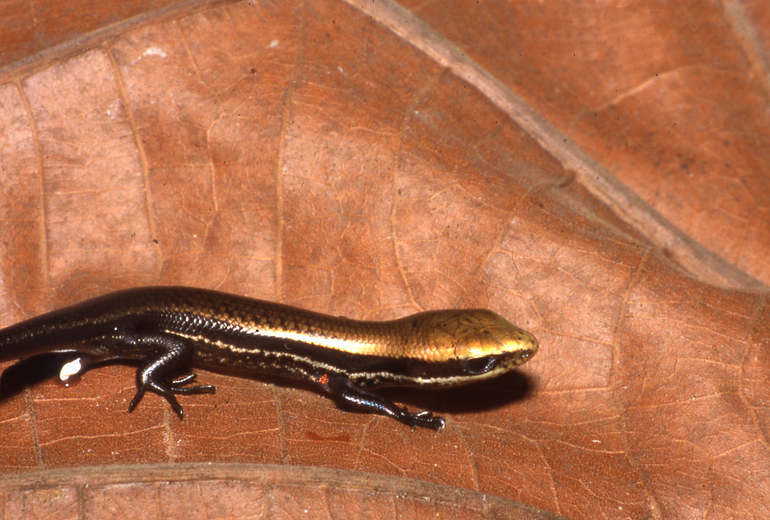

Conservation status
- Least Concern (IUCN 3.1)

Scientific classification
- Kingdom: Animalia
- Phylum: Chordata
- Class: Reptilia
- Order: Squamata
- Family: Scincidae
- Genus: Varzea
- Species: V. bistriata

Binomial name
- Varzea bistriata (Spix, 1825)
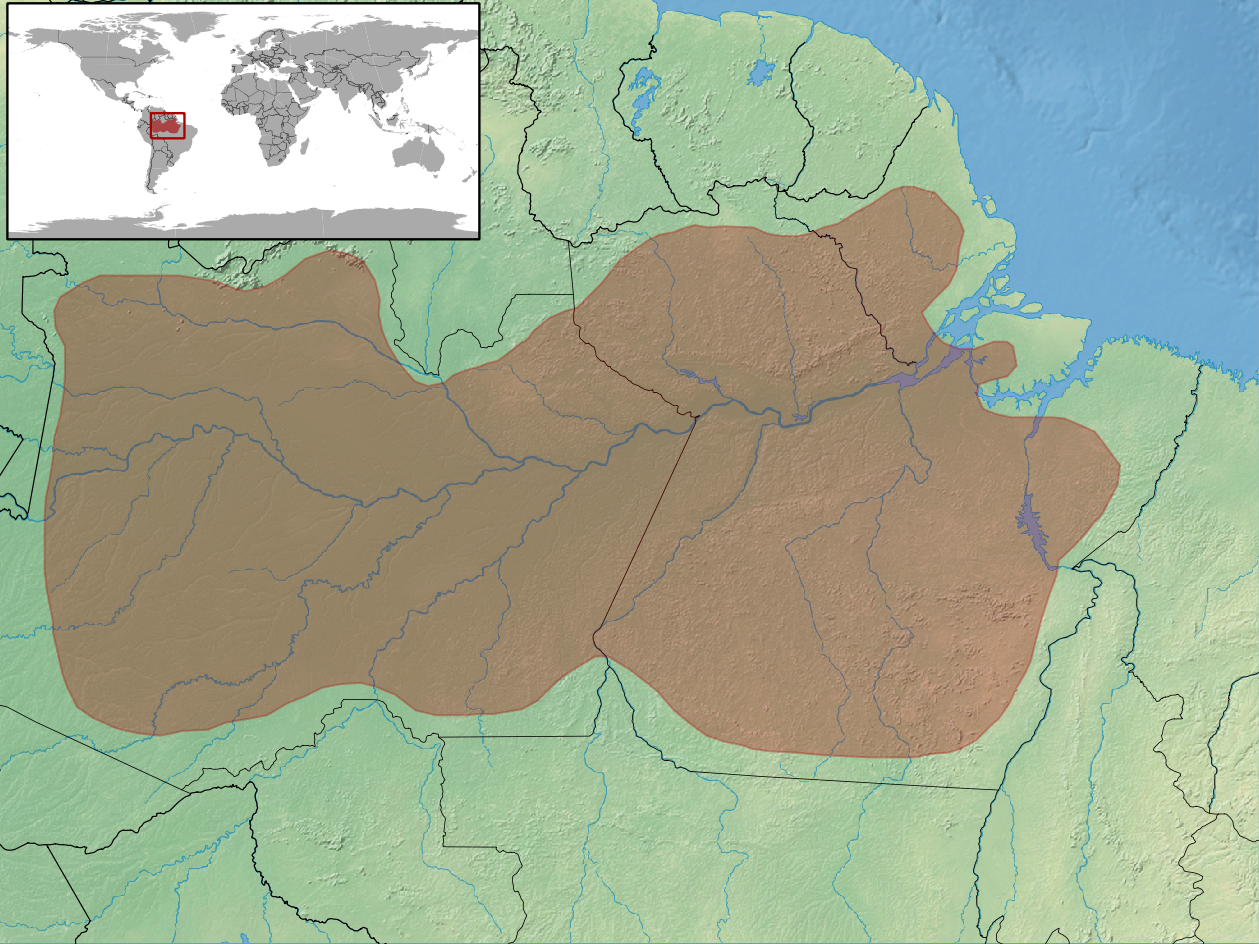

Synonyms
- Scincus bistriatus — Spix, 1825; Eumeces Spixii — Dumeril & Bibron, 1839; Mabouya agilis — Gosse, 1849; Mabuya agilis - Burt & Burt, 1931; Mabuya mabouya mabouya - Dunn, 1936; Mabuya mabouya - Hoogmoed, 1979; Mabuya ficta — Reboucas-Spieker, 1981

= Varzea bistriata =

Species of lizard

Varzea bistriata is a species of skink found in South America. The common name is the two-striped mabuya. It has shiny bronze or copper skin, with a dark longitudinal stripe along each flank that is often bordered by cream-colored lines.

Its taxonomy has undergone significant revision in recent years and remains unresolved, such that its distribution and distinction from two similar, closely related species is not clear. Many populations previously identified as M. bistriata have since been identified as M. mabouya (in the Caribbean) or M. nigropunctata (South America).

Notwithstanding populations that have been reassigned and pending further revisions, it has been recorded as present in Brazil, French Guiana, Bolivia, Peru, and Colombia.
