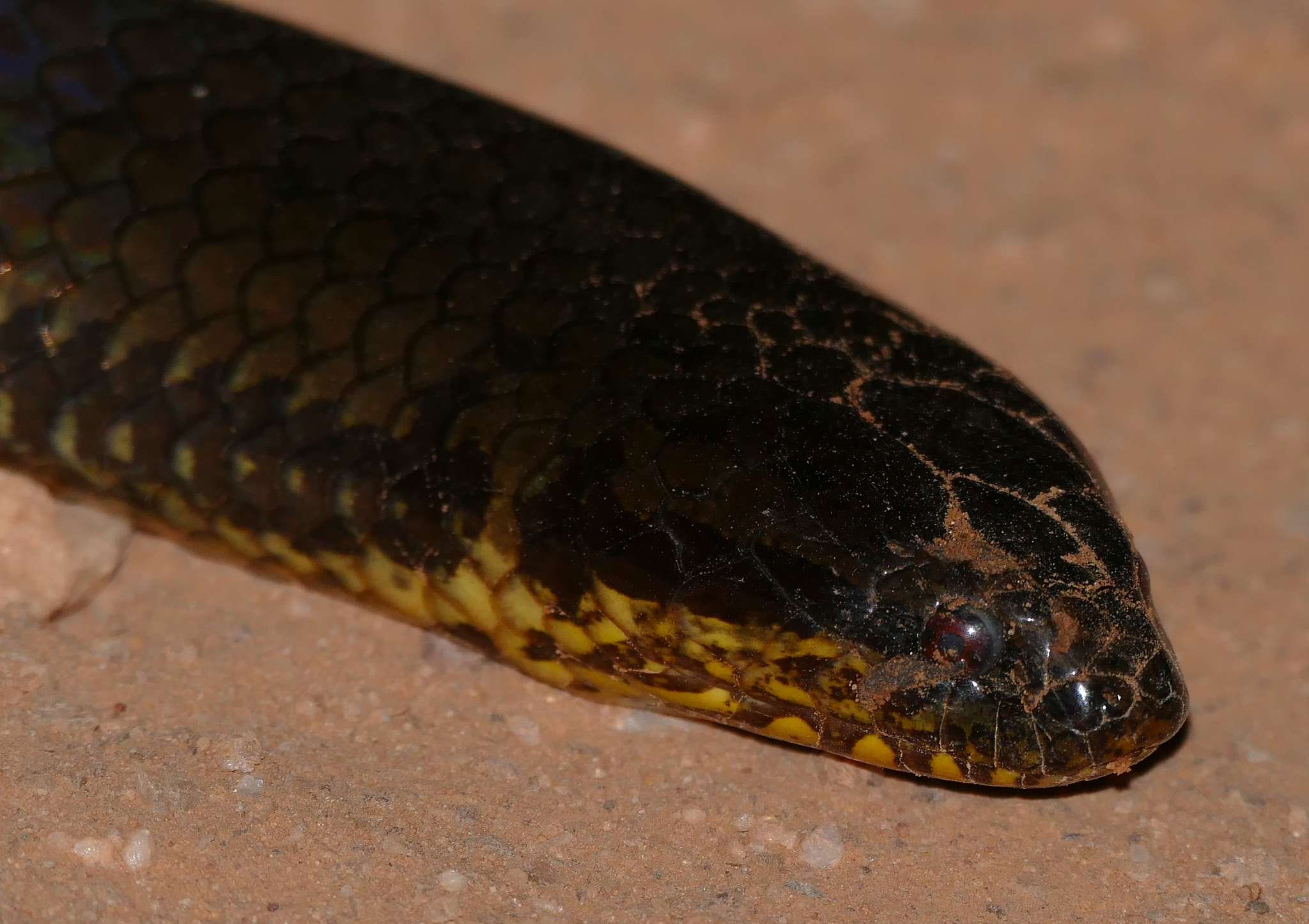
- Pseudoeryx plicatilis

Scientific classification
- Kingdom: Animalia
- Phylum: Chordata
- Class: Reptilia
- Order: Squamata
- Suborder: Serpentes
- Family: Colubridae
- Subfamily: Dipsadinae
- Genus: Pseudoeryx; Fitzinger, 1826

= Pseudoeryx =

Genus of snakes

Pseudoeryx is a genus of snakes of the subfamily Dipsadinae.

== Species ==
Species	Common name	Image
Pseudoeryx plicatilis (Linnaeus, 1758)	South American pond snake	
Pseudoeryx relictualis Schargel, Rivas-Fuenmayor, Barros, Péfaur & Navarette, 2007	Lake Maracaibo pond snake	
