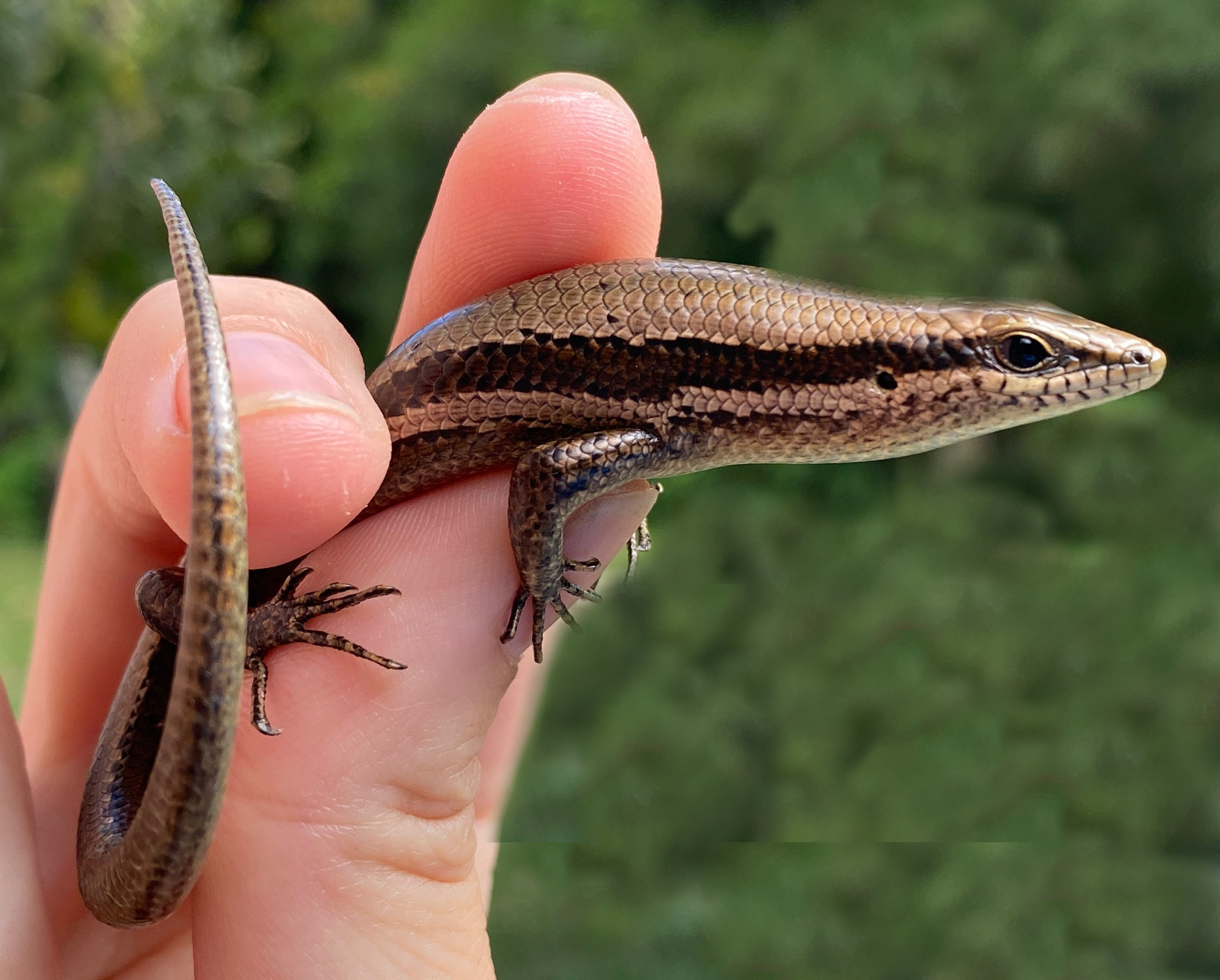

Conservation status
- Least Concern (IUCN 3.1)

Scientific classification
- Kingdom: Animalia
- Phylum: Chordata
- Class: Reptilia
- Order: Squamata
- Family: Scincidae
- Genus: Copeoglossum
- Species: C. aurae

Binomial name
- Copeoglossum aurae Hedges & Conn, 2012

= Copeoglossum aurae =

Species of lizard

Copeoglossum aurae, the Greater Windward skink, is a species of skink found in Grenada, St. Vincent, the Grenadines, and Trinidad and Tobago.
