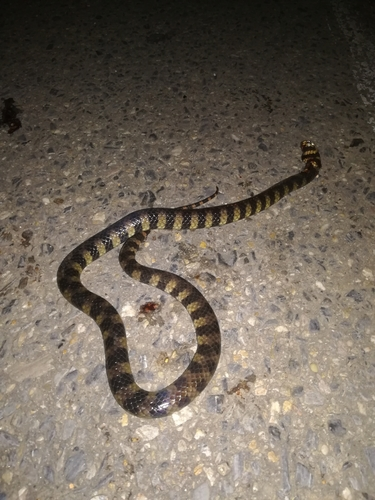

Conservation status
- Least Concern (IUCN 3.1)

Scientific classification
- Kingdom: Animalia
- Phylum: Chordata
- Class: Reptilia
- Order: Squamata
- Suborder: Serpentes
- Family: Colubridae
- Genus: Hydrops
- Species: H. triangularis

Binomial name
- Hydrops triangularis (Wagler, 1824)

Synonyms
- Elaps triangularis Wagler, 1824; Hydrops triangularis bassleri Roze, 1957; Hydrops triangularis bolivianus Roze, 1957; Hydrops triangularis fasciatus Roze, 1957; Hydrops triangularis neglectus Roze, 1957; Hydrops triangularis venezuelensis Roze, 1957

= Hydrops triangularis =

Species of snake

Hydrops triangularis, commonly known as the water false coral snake, the triangle water snake or triangle watersnake, and the water coral, is a species of snake in the subfamily Dipsadinae of the family Colubridae. The species is native to northern South America and the Amazon Basin. There are no subspecies that are recognized as being valid.

== Geographic range ==
Hydrops triangularis is found in Venezuela, Trinidad and Tobago, Guyana, Suriname, French Guiana, Colombia, Brazil, eastern Ecuador, eastern Peru, and northern Bolivia.

== Habitat ==
The preferred natural habitat of Hydrops triangularis is freshwater wetlands in forest and savanna, at altitudes from sea level to 500 m (1,600 ft), but it may also tolerate brackish water.

== Description ==
Hydrops triangularis reaches a maximum size of about 78 cm (31 in). It has smooth dorsal scales, which lack apical pits, and are arranged in 15 rows throughout the length of the body.

== Diet ==
Hydrops triangularis feeds on eels (especially synbranchids) and other freshwater fishes (especially elongated species).

== Reproduction ==
Hydrops triangularis is oviparous.
