= Micrurus circinalis =

Conservation status
- Least Concern (IUCN 3.1)

Scientific classification
- Kingdom: Animalia
- Phylum: Chordata
- Class: Reptilia
- Order: Squamata
- Suborder: Serpentes
- Family: Elapidae
- Genus: Micrurus
- Species: M. circinalis

Binomial name
- Micrurus circinalis (A.M.C. Duméril, Bibron & A.H.A. Duméril, 1854)
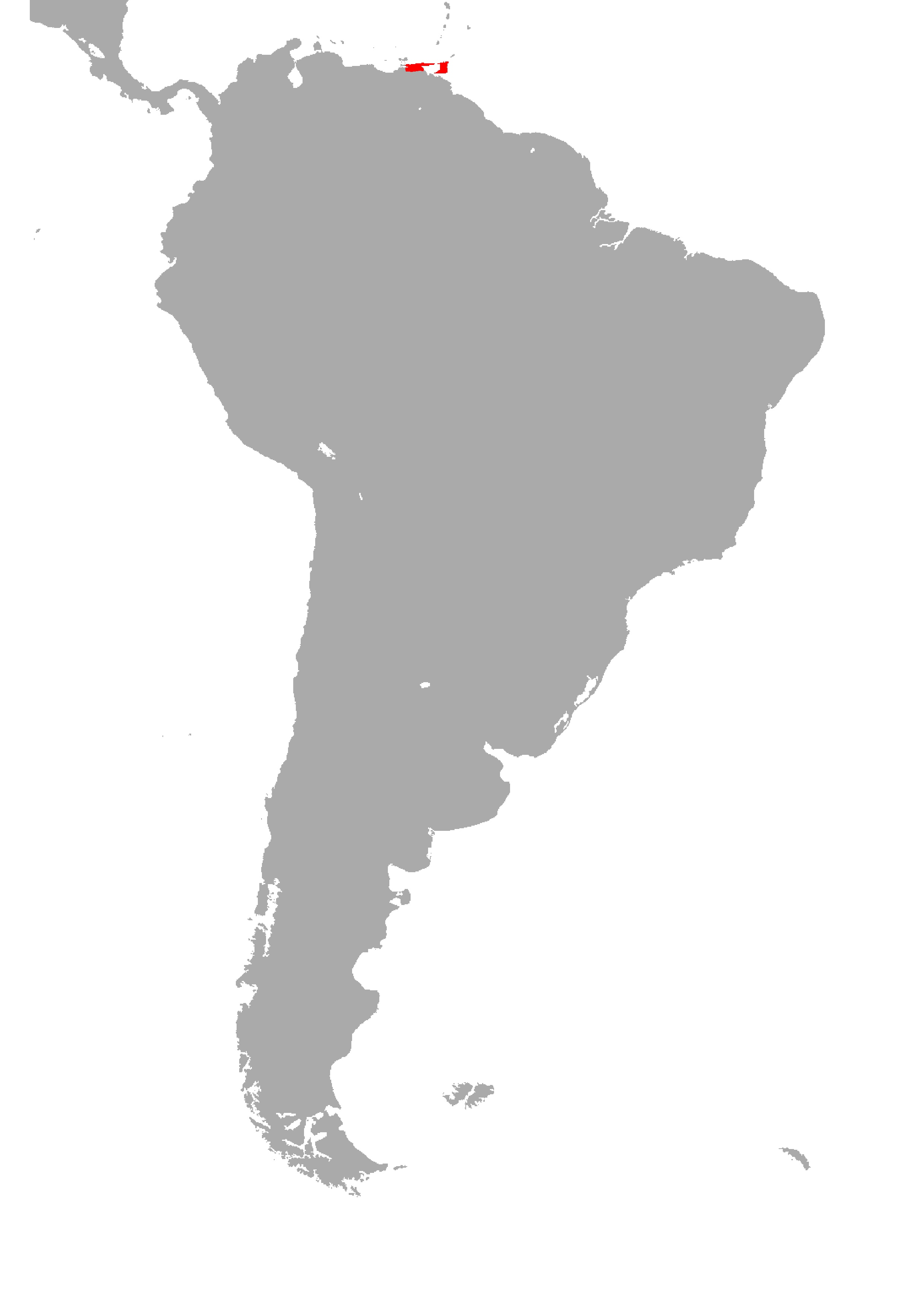

Synonyms
- Elaps circinalis A.M.C. Duméril, Bibron & A.H.A. Duméril, 1854; Micrurus psyches circinalis (A.M.C. Duméril, Bibron & A.H.A. Duméril, 1854); Elaps riisei Jan, 1858

Species of snake

Micrurus circinalis, also known commonly as the Trinidad coral snake, the Trinidad northern coral snake, and coral norteña trinitaria in South American Spanish, is a species of venomous snake in the family Elapidae. The species is native to northern South America and the extreme southern Caribbean.

== Description ==
Small for the genus Micrurus, adults of Micrurus circinalis usually have a total length (tail included) of 40–50 cm (16–20 in), with a maximum recorded total length of 53.7 cm (21.1 in) (Roze 1996).

== Geographic distribution ==
Micrurus circinalis is found in Trinidad and northeastern Venezuela.

== Habitat ==
The preferred natural habitats of Micrurus circinalis are forest and savanna, but it has also been found in artificial habitats such as agricultural areas and urban gardens.

== Behavior ==
Micrurus circinalis is terrestrial, fossorial, and predominately nocturnal, but may emerge to forage on cloudy days.

== Diet ==
Micrurus circinalis preys upon small lizards, such as species of the genus Bachia, and upon small snakes, such as those of the genera Atractus and Ninia.

== Reproduction ==
Micrurus circinalis is oviparous. Mating occurs in January–May, and egg-laying in July–September. Clutch size is 2–6 eggs.
