= Pseudoeryx relictualis =

Conservation status
- Vulnerable (IUCN 3.1)

Scientific classification
- Kingdom: Animalia
- Phylum: Chordata
- Class: Reptilia
- Order: Squamata
- Suborder: Serpentes
- Family: Colubridae
- Genus: Pseudoeryx
- Species: P. relictualis

Binomial name
- Pseudoeryx relictualis Schargel, Rivas-Fuenmayor, Barros, Péfaur, & Navarette,, 2007

Species of snake

Pseudoeryx relictualis , the South American pond snake, is a species of snake of the family Colubridae.

== Geographic range ==
The snake is found in Venezuela.
