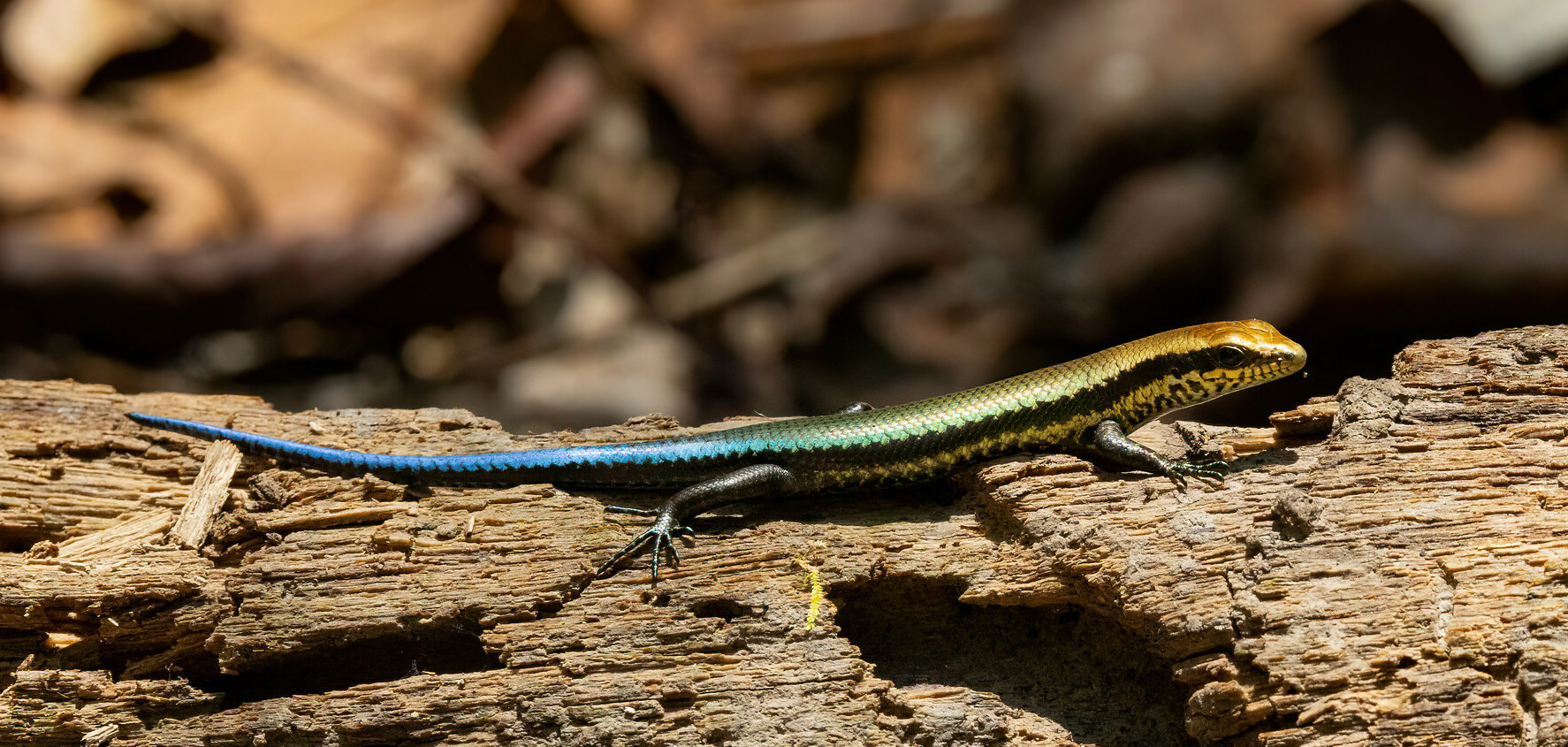

Conservation status
- Least Concern (IUCN 3.1)

Scientific classification
- Kingdom: Animalia
- Phylum: Chordata
- Class: Reptilia
- Order: Squamata
- Suborder: Scinciformata
- Infraorder: Scincomorpha
- Family: Mabuyidae
- Genus: Copeoglossum
- Species: C. nigropunctatum

Binomial name
- Copeoglossum nigropunctatum (Spix, 1825)

Synonyms
- Scincus nigropunctatus Spix, 1825; Copeoglossum cinctum - Tschudi, 1845; Mabuia agilis var. nigropunctata - Boulenger, 1887; Mabuia aurata - Boulenger, 1887; Mabuia agilis - Goeldi, 1902; Mabuya agilis agilis - Amaral, 1937; Mabuya mabouya mabouya - Dunn, 1935; Mabuya mabouia - Rand & Humphrey, 1968; Mabuya mabouya - Crump, 1971; Mabuya bistriata - Williams & Vanzolini, 1980; Mabuya nigropunctata - Greer et al., 2000

= Copeoglossum nigropunctatum =

Species of lizard

Copeoglossum nigropunctatum, also known as the black-spotted skink, common coppery mabuya, or South American spotted skink, is a species of skink found in South America. It has shiny bronze or copper skin, with a dark longitudinal stripe along each flank that is often bordered by cream-colored lines.

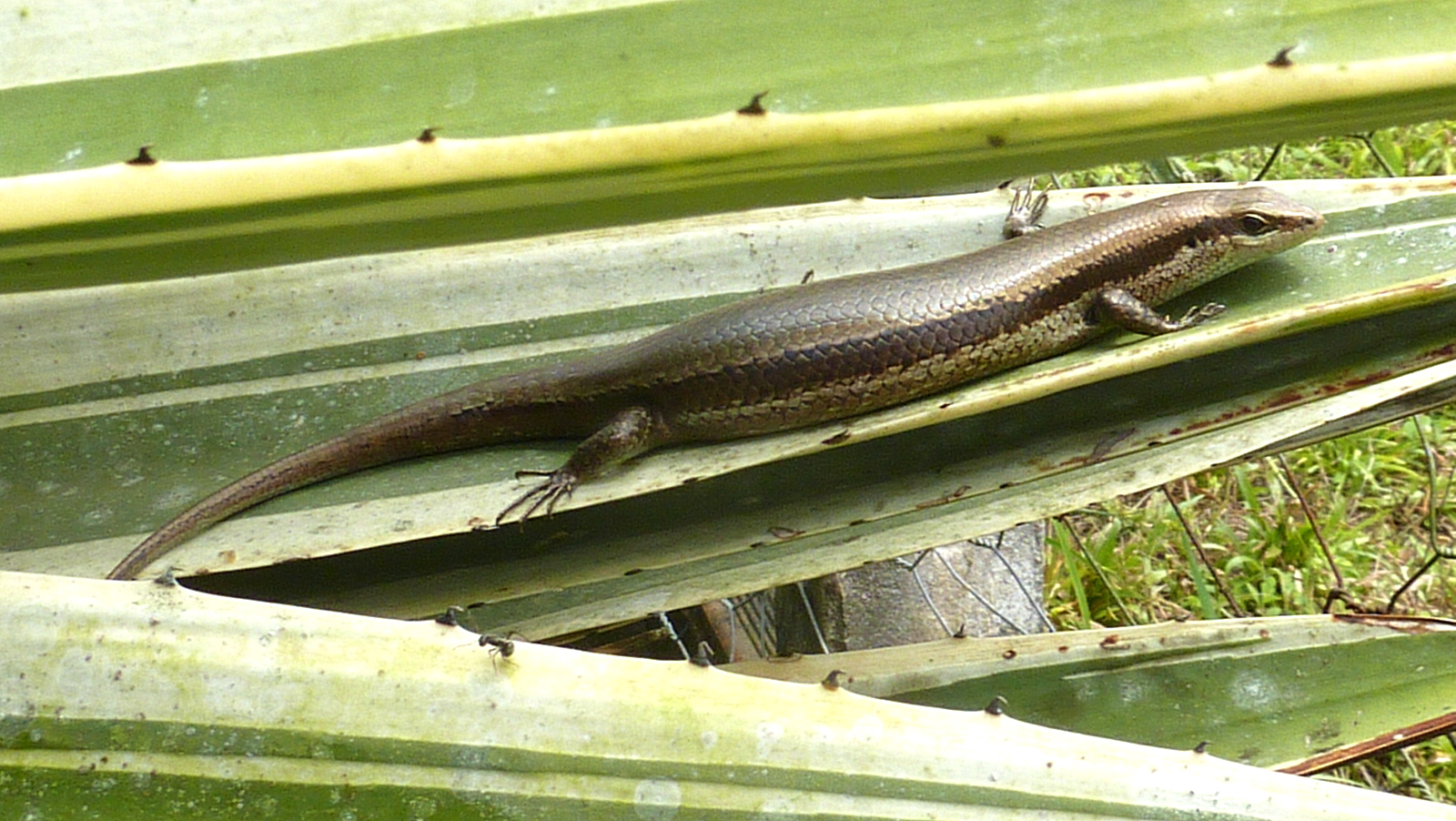

It has been recorded as present in much of the northern South America and the Amazon River Basin, including Venezuela, the Guyanas (Guyana, French Guiana, Suriname), Colombia, Ecuador, Peru, Brazil, Bolivia, and Paraguay.
