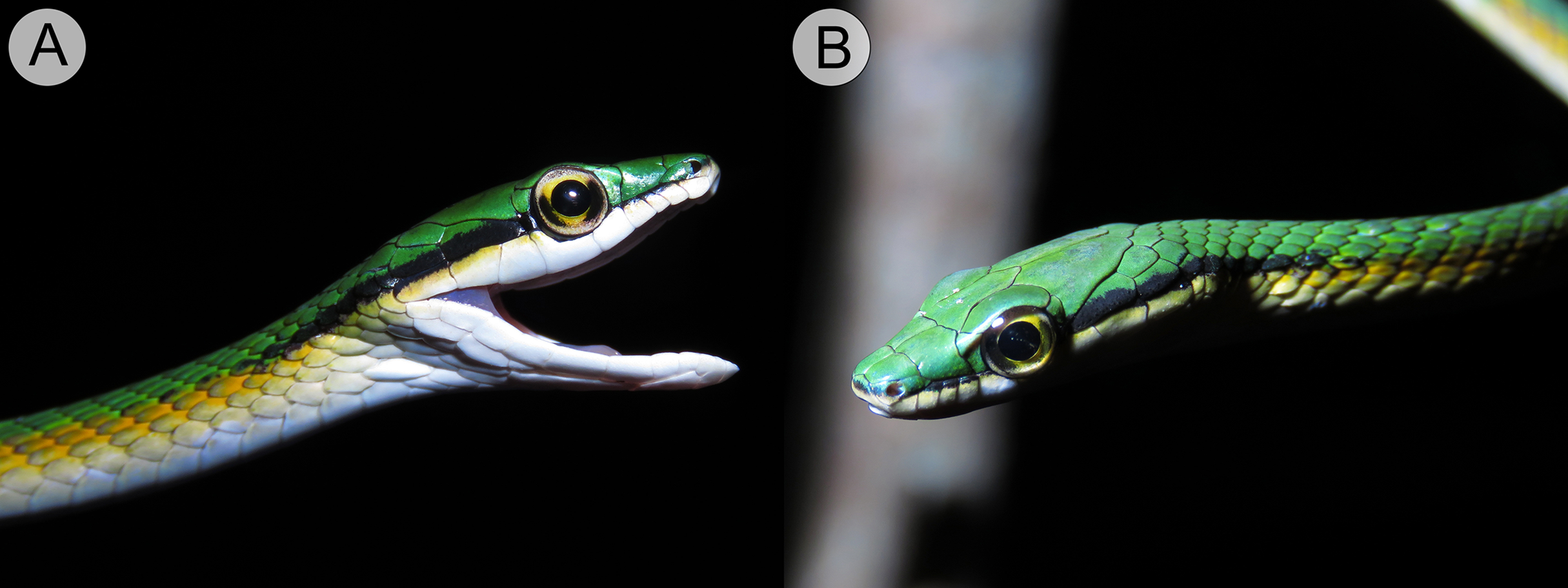

Scientific classification
- Kingdom: Animalia
- Phylum: Chordata
- Class: Reptilia
- Order: Squamata
- Suborder: Serpentes
- Family: Colubridae
- Genus: Leptophis
- Species: L. mystacinus

Binomial name
- Leptophis mystacinus Albuquerque et al., 2025
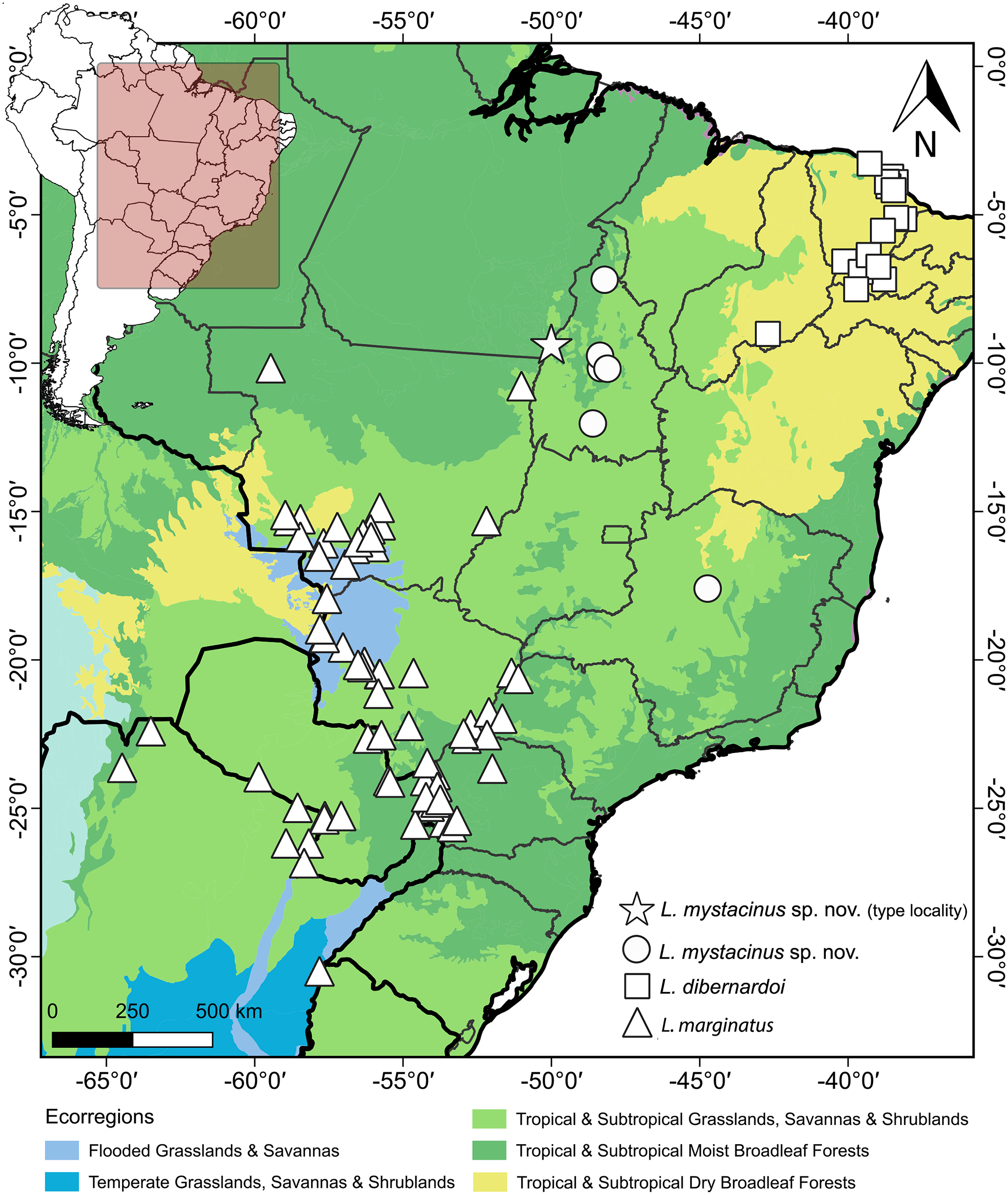
- Geographic distribution of Leptophis mystacinus (type locality [★] and other known localities [⬤])

= Leptophis mystacinus =

Species of parrot snakes

Leptophis mystacinus is a species of snake in the family Colubridae endemic to the Cerrado savanna of Brazil. It is one of around 20 named species within the genus Leptophis, and is most similar to L. dibernardoi. L. mystacinus is primarily characterized by its unique color pattern, including a mustache-like pigmented patch on the snout that lends the species its name.

== Etymology ==
The specific name, "mystacinus", combines the Greek word μύσταξ (mystax), meaning "mustache" or "upper lip" with the Latin suffix -inus, referring to a "likeness". The name references the distinct black pigmentation on the rostral scale of the species, reminiscent of a mustache.

== Classification ==
L. mystacinus is the twentieth species of Leptophis to be scientifically recognized. In their 2025 description of L. mystacinus, Albuquerque et al. tested the phylogenetic relationships of these species. They recovered L. mystacinus as the sister taxon to L. dibernardoi. The results from their analyses are displayed in the cladogram below, with polyphyletic lineages indicated with color-coded symbols.

- Leptophis
  - - Leptophis diplotropis
    - Leptophis depressirostris
  - - - Leptophis occidentalis ✱
      - - Leptophis cupreus
        - Leptophis riveti
    - - Leptophis occidentalis ✱
      - - - Leptophis ahaetulla ✱
          - Leptophis nigromarginatus ✱
        - - - - Leptophis nigromarginatus ✱
              - Leptophis occidentalis ✱
            - - Leptophis nigromarginatus ✱
              - - Leptophis bocourti
                - - Leptophis dibernardoi
                  - Leptophis mystacinus
          - - - Leptophis ahaetulla ✱
              - Leptophis marginatus
            - - Leptophis coeruleodorsus
              - Leptophis nigromarginatus ✱
