= Lora =

Lora as a family name in the Spanish language of French origin meaning from Lorraine, a region in Northeastern France that was named in honor of Lothair I. It's Latin origin that means "crowned with laurel" or "laurel".

As a female given name Lora may also be a variant of Laura or derived from an Italian hypocoristic of either Eleonora or Loredana.

== People with the given name Lora ==
- Lora (singer) (born 1982), Romanian singer
- Lora Aborn (1907–2005), American composer
- Lora Aroyo, Dutch computer scientist
- Lora Beldon, American artist-curator
- Lora Haines Cook (1866–1946), American civic leader
- Lora L. Corum (1899-1949), American co-winner
- Lora Dimitrova (born 1962), Bulgarian Pianist
- Lora Fachie (born 1988), English racing cyclist
- Lora Fairclough (born 1970), English professional golfer
- Lora Lee Gayer (born 1988), American actress
- Lora Grosu (born 1959), Moldovan politician
- Lora Hirschberg (born 1963), American sound engineer
- Lora Hooper, American biologist
- Lora Hubbel, American politician
- Lora Johnson, American author
- Lora Lazar, Bulgarian crime writer
- Lora Leigh (born 1965), American author
- Lora Logic (born 1960), British saxophonist
- Lora La Mance (1857–1939), American writer
- Lora Marx (1900-1989), American sculptor
- Lora Lee Michel (born 1940), American actress
- Lora Ottenad (born 1964), American professional bodybuilder
- Lora Petrova (born 1998), Bulgarian footballer
- Lora Reinbold (born 1964), American politician
- Lora Romero (1960-1997), American assistant professor
- Lora Storey (born 1989), Australian middle-distance runner
- Lora Webster (born 1986), American Paralympic volleyballist
- Lora Wondolowski (born 1969), American biologist and politician
- Lora Yakovleva (1932–2022), Russian chess grandmaster

== People with the surname Lora ==
- Alberto Lora Ramos (born 1987), Spanish football player
- Alex Lora (born 1952), Mexican musician and composer
- Carmen Josefina Lora Iglesias (1940 – 1999), Dominican revolutionary and lawyer
- Enrique Lora (born 1945), Spanish footballer
- Fabiano Bolla Lora (born 1977), Brazilian footballer
- Filippo Lora (born 1993), Italian footballer
- Francisco Augusto Lora, Dominican politician
- Guillermo Lora (1922-2009), Bolivian Trotskyist
- Gregorio de Lora (1815-1863) wDominican general in the Dominican Republic War of Independence.
- Johan Lora (born 1982), Dominican footballer
- Luis Eduardo Lora (born 1986), Colombian footballer
- Mathias Loras (1792-1858), French priest
- Manny Lora (born 1991), American baseball player and coach
- Marie Lora-Mungai, French producer, writer and show runner
- Miguel "Happy" Lora (born 1961), Colombian boxer
- Ñico Lora (1880-1971), Dominican, father of Merengue music
- Saturnino and Mariano Lora, Cuban brothers, war heroes
- Yelitza Lora, Dominican television and radio host and actress

== Places ==
- Lora (Lydia), a town of ancient Lydia, now in Turkey
- Lora, Norway, a village in Lesja municipality in Oppland
- Lora, Chile a town on the Mataquito River, Chile
- Lora, a frazioni in the municipality of Campegine, Italy
- Lora (Split), a neighborhood and naval base in Split, Croatia
- Lora, Abbottabad, a village and union council in Pakistan
- Lora River, Pakistan
- Lora de Estepa, a municipality in the province of Seville, Spain
- Lora del Río, a municipality in the province of Seville, Spain
- Falls of Lora, a tidal race which forms at the mouth of Loch Etive, Scotland
- Sargentes de la Lora, a municipality located in the province of Burgos, Castile and León, Spain.

== Animals ==
- Lora or Bothriechis lateralis, a pit viper species found in the mountains of Costa Rica and western Panama.
- Lora or Leptophis ahaetulla, a Parrot Snake found in northern South America and Trinidad and Tobago
- Grey Lora or Leptophis stimsoni, a small snake which is endemic to Trinidad and Tobago
- Lora (genus), a gastropod genus of the Turridae family

== Technology ==
- LORA (missile), a theatre quasiballistic missile produced in Israel
- LORA, an acronym for level of repair analysis
- LoRa, a long-range low-power wireless communication technology over radio frequencies
- LORA, an acronym for "logic of rational agents", see BDI software agents
- LoRA (machine learning), an acronym for "low-rank adaptation". A technique for efficiently fine-tuning machine learning models.

== Other ==
- Lora, an Ancient Roman term for a wine substitute later known as piquette
- Lora (film), a 2007 Hungarian film

== See also ==
- Laura (disambiguation)
- Lota (name)
