= Flaviopolis =

Flaviopolis may refer to:

- Flaviopolis (Bithynia), a town of ancient Bithynia
- Flaviopolis (Cilicia), a town of ancient Cilicia
- Flaviopolis (Lydia), a town of ancient Lydia

== See also ==
- Colonia Flaviopolis
- Flaviocaesareia
