= American Quarterly =

US academic journal

- Discipline: American studies
- Language: English
- Edited by: Jason Ruiz

Publication details
- History: 1949–present
- Publisher: Johns Hopkins University Press for the American Studies Association (United States)
- Frequency: Quarterly

Standard abbreviations
- ISO 4: Am. Q.

Indexing
- ISSN: 0003-0678 (print); 1080-6490 (web)
- JSTOR: 00030678
- OCLC no.: 1480637

Links
- Journal homepage; Online access

American Quarterly is an academic journal and the official publication of the American Studies Association. The journal covers topics of both domestic and international concern in the United States and is considered a leading resource in the field of American studies. The current editor-in-chief is Jason Ruiz (University of Notre Dame). The journal is published quarterly by the Johns Hopkins University Press. It has been promoting digital research and teaching.

== Controversy ==
A 2026 report by the Progressive Policy Institute called the journal's scholarship "unrelentingly negative", stating that 80 percent of articles between 2022 and 2024 were critical of the United States, while the remaining papers were neutral. In response, editor Jason Ruiz said that the journal's mission was not "national boosterism."
