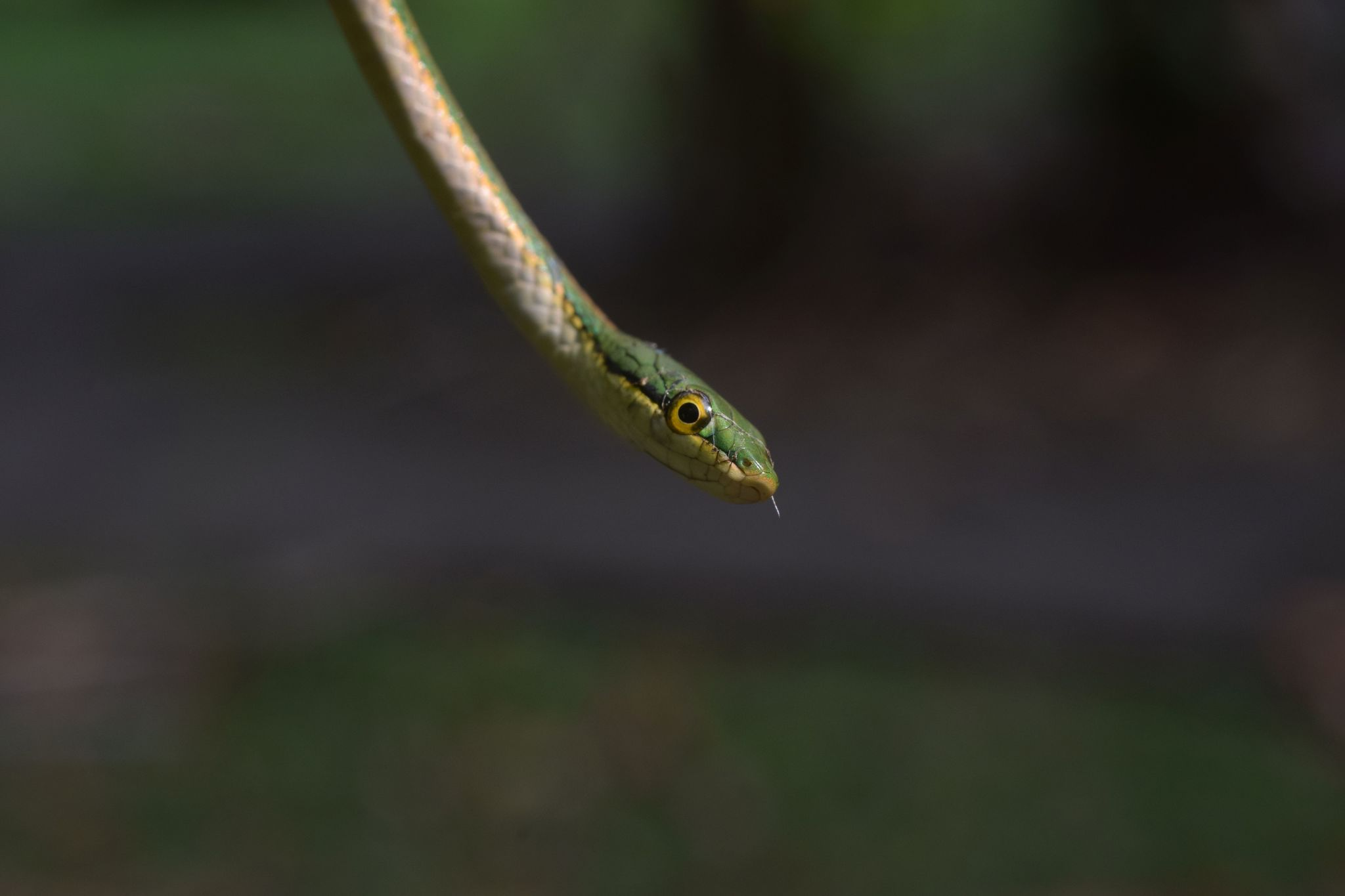

Conservation status
- Least Concern (IUCN 3.1)

Scientific classification
- Kingdom: Animalia
- Phylum: Chordata
- Class: Reptilia
- Order: Squamata
- Suborder: Serpentes
- Family: Colubridae
- Genus: Leptophis
- Species: L. nebulosus

Binomial name
- Leptophis nebulosus Oliver, 1942

= Leptophis nebulosus =

Oliver's parrot snake

Species of snake

Leptophis nebulosus, commonly known as Oliver's parrot snake, is a species of arboreal snake of the family Colubridae. It is found in Central America (Panama, Costa Rica, Nicaragua, Honduras).

Leptophis nebulosus occurs in moist, wet and rainforests where it lives arboreally in the understory vegetation. It is diurnal and preys on lizards and sleeping frogs. It is oviparous.
