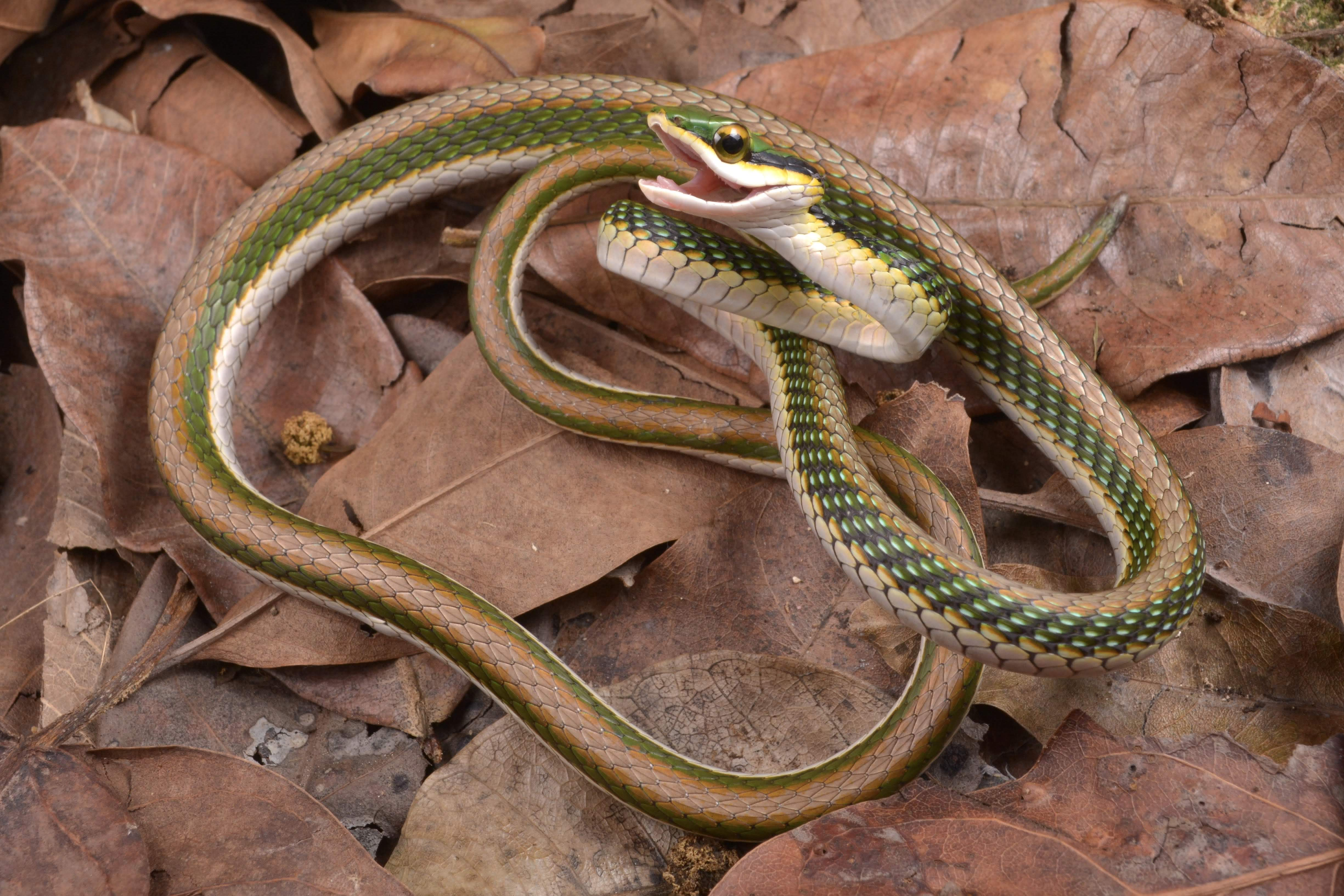
- An adult Mexican parrot snake (Leptophis mexicanus) found in Quintana Roo, Mexico

Conservation status
- Least Concern (IUCN 3.1)

Scientific classification
- Kingdom: Animalia
- Phylum: Chordata
- Class: Reptilia
- Order: Squamata
- Suborder: Serpentes
- Family: Colubridae
- Genus: Leptophis
- Species: L. mexicanus

Binomial name
- Leptophis mexicanus A.M.C. Duméril, Bibron & A.H.A. Duméril, 1854

Synonyms
- Leptophis mexicanus A.M.C. Duméril, Bibron & A.H.A. Duméril, 1854; Ahætulla mexicana — Günther, 1858; Thrasops mexicanus — Cope, 1860; Hapsidophrys mexicanus — Cope, 1885; Thalerophis mexicanus — Oliver, 1948; Leptophis mexicanus — J. Peters & Orejas-Miranda, 1970

= Leptophis mexicanus =

Species of snake

Leptophis mexicanus, commonly known as the Mexican parrot snake, is a species of medium-sized slender snake in the family Colubridae. The species is endemic to the Americas.

== Geographic range ==
L. mexicanus can be found in southern Mexico and Central America, in Guatemala, Belize, Honduras, El Salvador, Nicaragua, and Costa Rica.

== Subspecies ==
There are four recognized subspecies, including the nominate subspecies.

- L. m. hoeversi Henderson, 1976
- L. m. mexicanus A.M.C. Duméril, Bibron & A.H.A. Duméril, 1854
- L. m. septentrionalis Mertens, 1972
- L. m. yucatanensis Oliver, 1942
