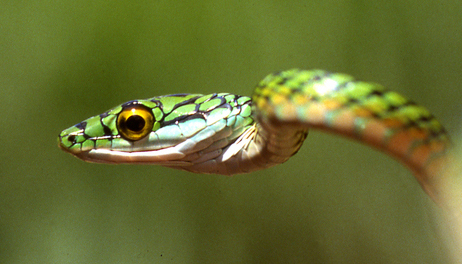
- Leptophis ahaetulla

Scientific classification
- Kingdom: Animalia
- Phylum: Chordata
- Class: Reptilia
- Order: Squamata
- Suborder: Serpentes
- Family: Colubridae
- Subfamily: Colubrinae
- Genus: Leptophis; Bell, 1825

Species
- see text

= Leptophis =

Genus of snakes

Leptophis is a genus of colubrid snakes, commonly known as parrot snakes. The species within this genus are widely distributed throughout Mexico, Central and South America.

== Classification ==
The genus Leptophis belongs to the subfamily Colubrinae, of the family Colubridae. The species relationships within Leptophis can be shown in the cladogram below, with possible paraphyletic species identified:

- L. depressirostris
- - L. diplotropis
  - - - L. cupreus
      - L. riveti
    - - L. occidentalis (Panama & Honduras) (paraphyletic)
      - - L. bocourti
        - - L. occidentalis (Ecuador) (paraphyletic)
          - - L. ahaetulla (Guyana) (paraphyletic)
            - - L. marginatus
              - - L. nigromarginatus (paraphyletic)
                - - L. nigromarginatus (paraphyletic)
                  - - L. coeruleodorsus
                    - - L. sp. nov.
                      - L. ahaetulla (Brazil) (paraphyletic)

== Description ==
Snakes of the genus Leptophis are slender with a long tail. The body is cylindrical or slightly laterally compressed. The head is elongated and distinct from the neck. The eye is large with a round pupil. The dorsal scales are arranged in 15 rows at midbody. The maxillary teeth, which number 20–32, are in a continuous series without any interspace, and are longest posteriorly. Conversely, the mandibular teeth are longest anteriorly.

== Species and subspecies ==
The following species and subspecies are currently recognized as being valid:

- Leptophis ahaetulla (Linnaeus, 1758) – giant parrot snake
- Leptophis bocourti Boulenger, 1898
- Leptophis bolivianus Oliver, 1942
- Leptophis coeruleodorsus Oliver, 1942 – Oliver's parrot snake
- Leptophis cupreus (Cope, 1868) – copper parrot snake
- Leptophis depressirostris (Cope, 1861) – Cope's parrot snake
- Leptophis dibernardoi Albuquerque, Santos, Borges-Nojosa & R. Ávila, 2022
- Leptophis diplotropis (Günther, 1872) - Pacific Coast parrot snake
  - Leptophis diplotropis diplotropis (Günther, 1872)
  - Leptophis diplotropis forreri H.M. Smith, 1943
- Leptophis liocercus Wied-Neuwied, 1824
- Leptophis marginatus Cope, 1862
- Leptophis mexicanus A.M.C. Duméril, Bibron & A.H.A. Duméril, 1854 – Mexican parrot snake
  - Leptophis mexicanus hoeversi Henderson, 1976
  - Leptophis mexicanus mexicanus A.M.C. Duméril, Bibron & A.H.A. Duméril, 1854
  - Leptophis mexicanus septentrionalis Mertens, 1972
  - Leptophis mexicanus yucatanensis Oliver, 1942
- Leptophis modestus (Günther, 1872) – cloud forest parrot snake
- Leptophis mystacinus Albuquerque et al., 2025
- Leptophis nebulosus Oliver, 1942 – Oliver's parrot snake
- Leptophis nigromarginatus (Günther, 1866) - black-skinned parrot snake
- Leptophis occidentalis (Günther, 1859)
- Leptophis praestans Cope, 1868
- Leptophis riveti Despax, 1910 – Despax's parrot snake
- Leptophis stimsoni Harding, 1995 – Trinidad upland parrot snake
- Leptophis urostictus (W. Peters, 1873)

Nota bene: A binomial authority or trinomial authority in parentheses indicates that the species or subspecies was originally described in a genus other than Leptophis.
