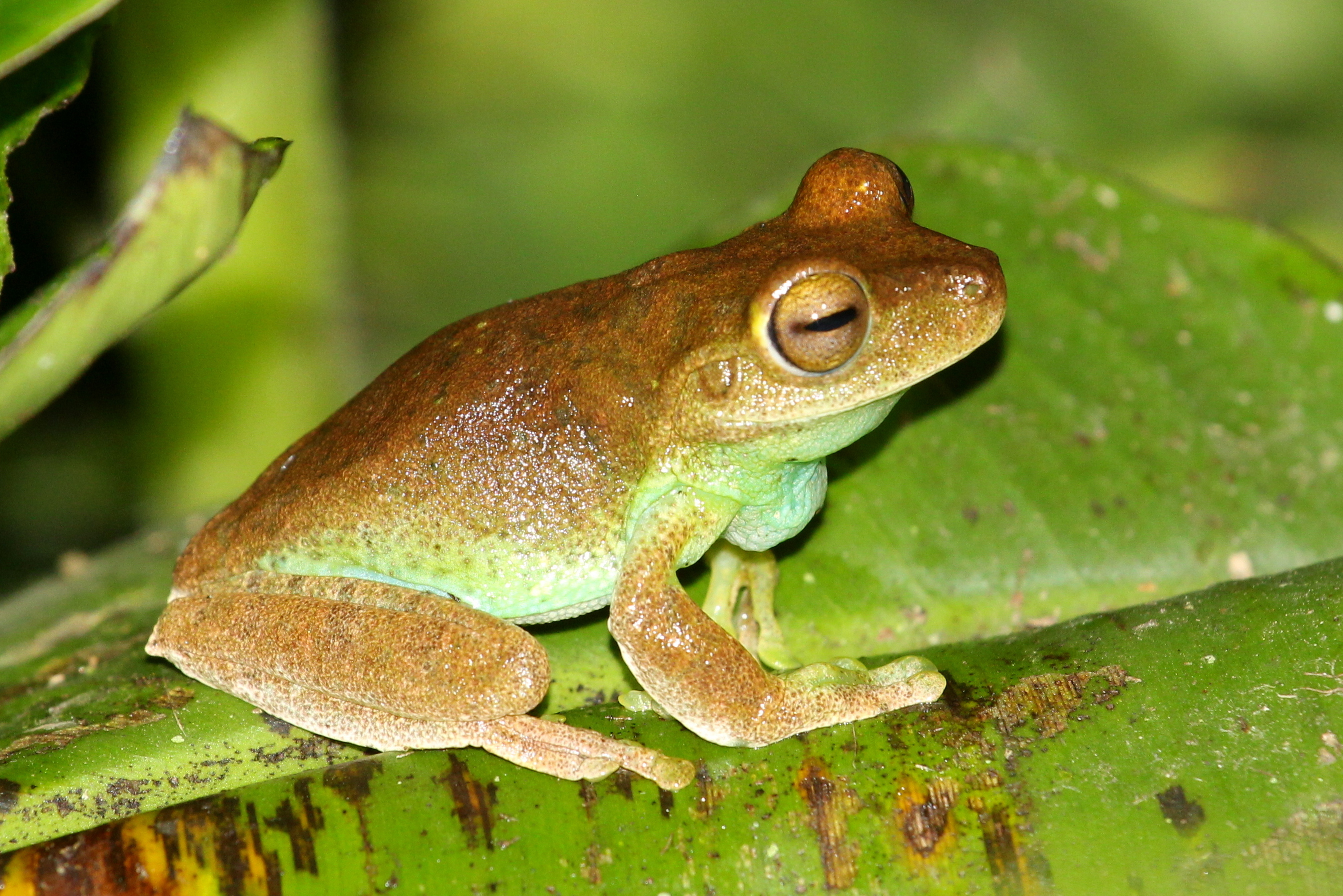

Conservation status
- Least Concern (IUCN 3.1)

Scientific classification
- Kingdom: Animalia
- Phylum: Chordata
- Class: Amphibia
- Order: Anura
- Family: Hylidae
- Genus: Boana
- Species: B. pellucens

Binomial name
- Boana pellucens (Werner, 1901)

Synonyms
- Hyla guibei Cochran & Goin, 1970; Hyla pulicaria Werner, 1901; Hypsiboas pellucens (Werner, 1901)

= Palmar tree frog =

Species of amphibian

The palmar tree frog (Boana pellucens) is a species of frog in the family Hylidae found in Colombia, Ecuador, and Peru. Its natural habitats are subtropical or tropical moist lowland forests, swamps, freshwater marshes, rural gardens, urban areas, heavily degraded former forests, and ponds.

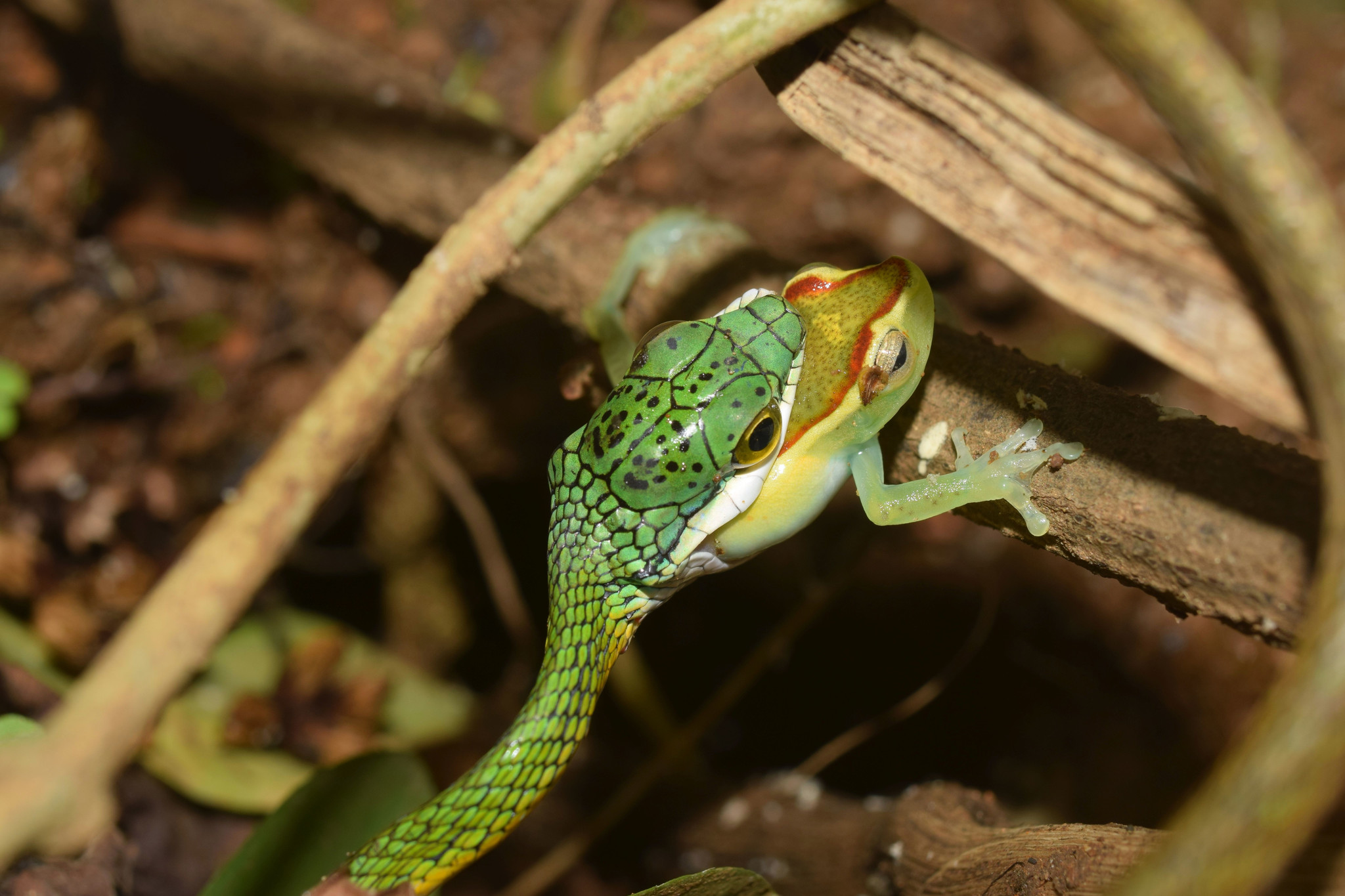
Juvenile being preyed on by Leptophis bocourti
