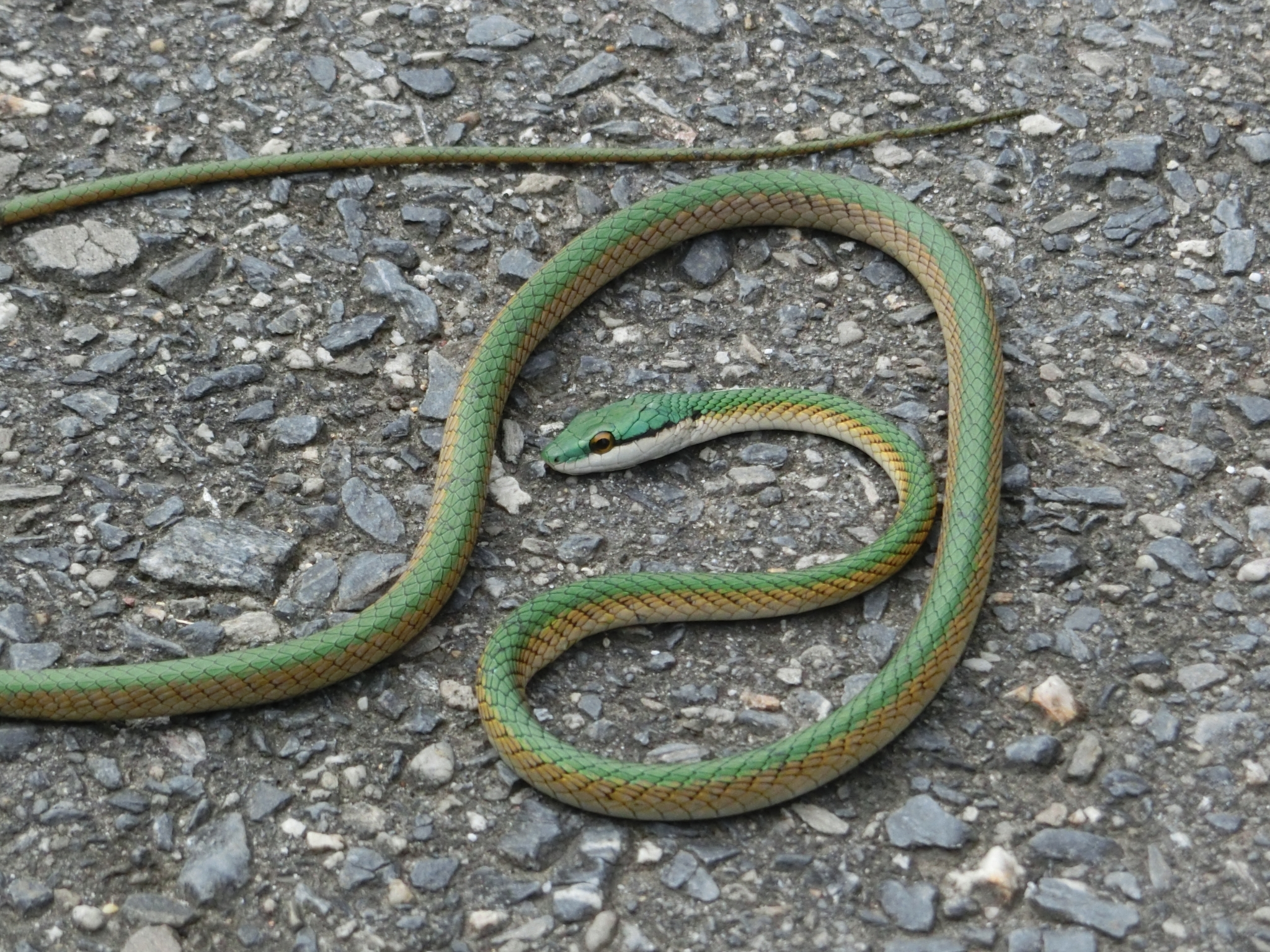

Conservation status
- Least Concern (IUCN 3.1)

Scientific classification
- Kingdom: Animalia
- Phylum: Chordata
- Class: Reptilia
- Order: Squamata
- Suborder: Serpentes
- Family: Colubridae
- Genus: Leptophis
- Species: L. coeruleodorsus

Binomial name
- Leptophis coeruleodorsus Oliver, 1942

= Leptophis coeruleodorsus =

Species of snake

Leptophis coeruleodorsus, the green-and-yellow parrot snake or Oliver's parrot snake, is a species of nonvenomous snake in the family Colubridae. It is found in Venezuela and Trinidad and Tobago.
