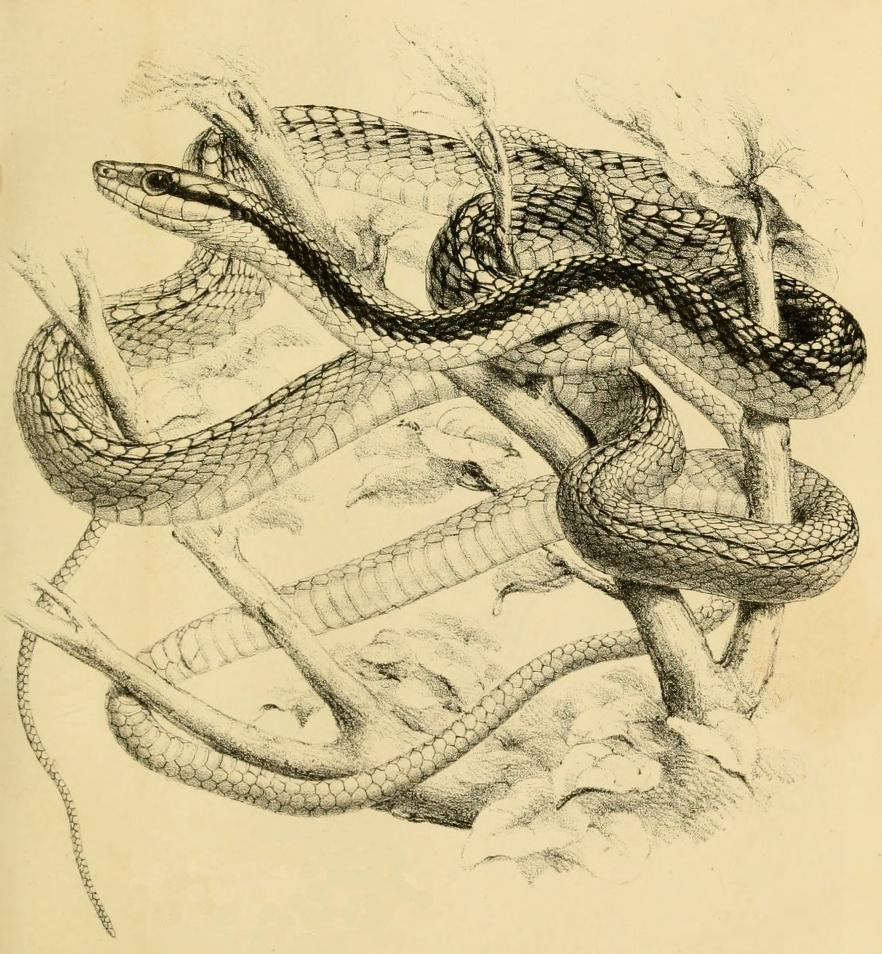
- Original illustration by G.H. Ford in Günther, 1872

Conservation status
- Least Concern (IUCN 3.1)

Scientific classification
- Kingdom: Animalia
- Phylum: Chordata
- Class: Reptilia
- Order: Squamata
- Suborder: Serpentes
- Family: Colubridae
- Genus: Leptophis
- Species: L. diplotropis

Binomial name
- Leptophis diplotropis (Günther, 1872)

Synonyms
- Ahætulla diplotropis Günther, 1872; Hapsidophrys diplotropis — Cope, 1886; Leptophis diplotropis — Boulenger, 1894; Thalerophis diplotropis — Oliver, 1947; Leptophis diplotropis Álvarez del Toro & H.M. Smith, 1956

= Leptophis diplotropis =

Species of snake

Leptophis diplotropis, commonly known as the Pacific Coast parrot snake, is a species of snake in the family Colubridae. The species is endemic to Mexico.

== Geographic range ==
The geographic range of L. diplotropis in Mexico extends from southwestern Chihuahua and southern Sonora to southeastern Oaxaca.

== Description ==
Dorsally, L. diplotropis is green (which fades to blue in alcohol) with black and white striping. Ventrally, it is white. Males may attain a snout-to-vent length (SVL) of 90 cm (35 in) plus a tail length of 51 cm (20 in). Females, which are smaller, may attain 73 cm (29 in) SVL plus a 37 cm (15 in) tail. It has on average 19 maxillary teeth, of which the rearmost two are strongly enlarged.

== Subspecies ==
There are two recognized subspecies, including the nominate race.

- Leptophis diplotropis diplotropis (Günther, 1872)
- Leptophis diplotropis forreri H.M. Smith, 1943

Nota bene: A trinomial authority in parentheses indicates that the subspecies was originally described in a genus other than Leptophis.

== Etymology ==
The subspecific name, forreri, is in honor of Alphonse Forrer (1836–1899), an English-born collector of zoological specimens in Mexico for the British Museum.

== Habitat ==
L. diplotropis is found in tropical dry forest, semi-deciduous forest, mangrove forest, oak forest and wet forest, from sea level up to 1,600 m (5,200 ft). It is a highly adaptable species, which is also found in disturbed areas.

== Behavior ==
L. diplotropis is diurnal and mostly arboreal.

== Diet ==
L. diplotropis preys predominately upon frogs (genera Agalychnis, Lithobates, Smilisca, Tlalocohyla, Trachycephalus) and lizards (genus Phyllodactylus).

== Reproduction ==
L. diplotropis is oviparous.
