= Leptophis liocercus =

Scientific classification
- Kingdom: Animalia
- Phylum: Chordata
- Class: Reptilia
- Order: Squamata
- Suborder: Serpentes
- Family: Colubridae
- Genus: Leptophis
- Species: L. liocercus

Binomial name
- Leptophis liocercus Wied-Neuwied, 1824)

Species of snake

Leptophis liocercus is a species of nonvenomous snake in the family Colubridae. It is found in Brazil.
