= Mary Edwards Wertsch =

American author and journalist

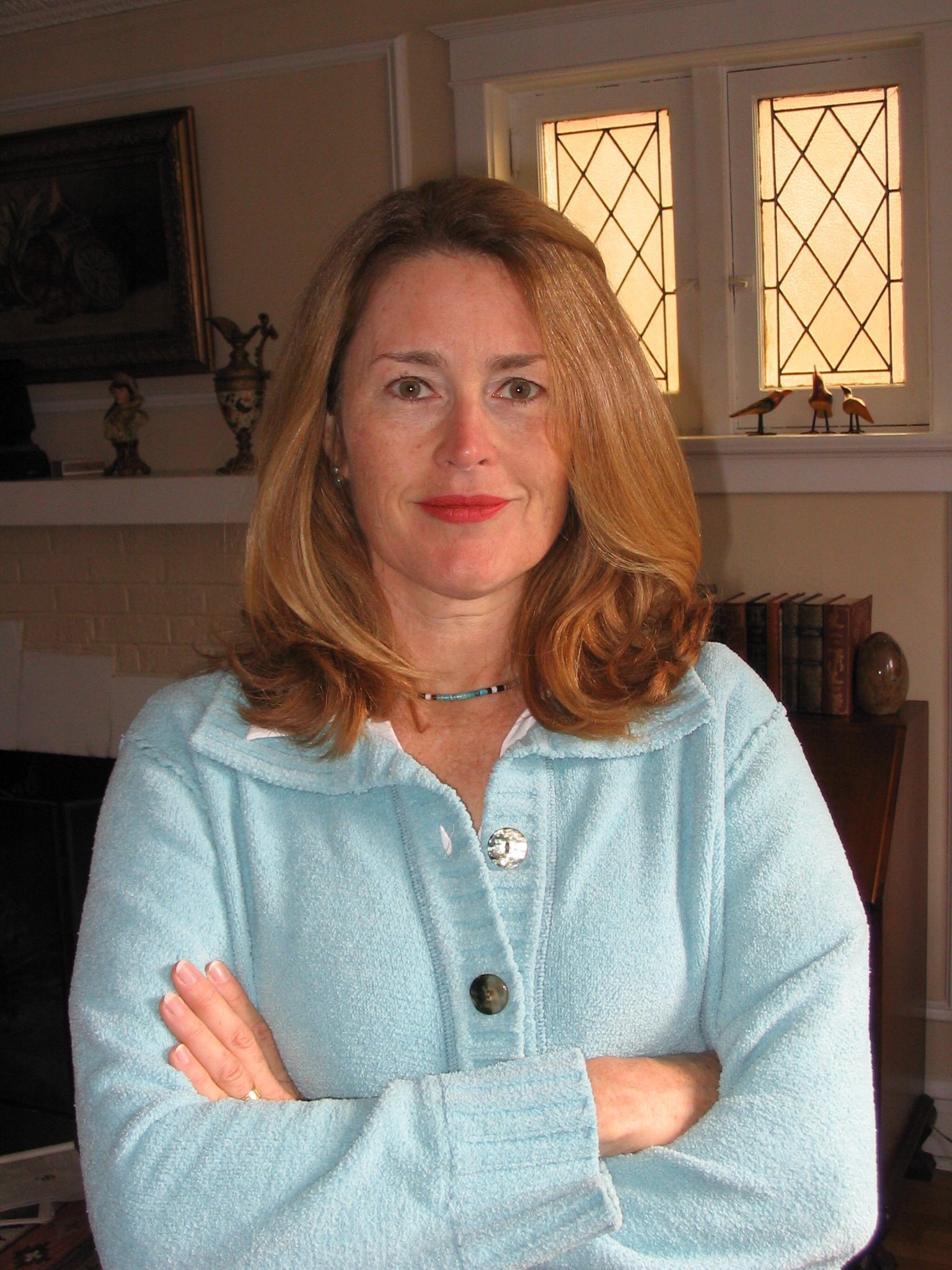
Wertsch in September 2005

Mary Edwards Wertsch (born Mary Brightwell Edwards on July 23, 1951) is an author, journalist, independent publisher, and expert on the subculture of American military brats. She wrote the book Military Brats: Legacies of Childhood Inside the Fortress. This book is considered the seminal piece of literature dealing with the effects of growing up as a military brat. In writing the book, Wertsch, a reporter by training, interviewed over 80 military brats and documented the patterns she found in the ways military children are raised, and the ways they continue to be affected, both positively and negatively, well into adulthood.

== Early life ==
Born into a career Army family, Mary Brightwell Edwards, as she was then named, lived in 20 houses and attended 12 schools by the time she was 18. She has one brother, David, born in 1940. Their father. David Lincoln Edwards (USMA, 1936), took the family overseas on assignments to West Germany in the early 1950s and to France in the early 1960s, where Mary attended a French school for two years (the Lycee Internationale, also known as SHAPE School, then in St. Germain-en-Laye, France). Bases where she lived growing up include Ft. Myer, Virginia; Ft. Bragg, North Carolina; and Ft. Monroe, Virginia. She graduated from the College of William & Mary in 1973 with a B.A. in philosophy, and began a career in journalism. She worked for two newspapers in Virginia, doing investigative reporting, feature writing, and a column, before moving to San Francisco and Chicago to pursue other projects. In 1985 she married James V. Wertsch, Ph.D. They have two sons.

Wertsch now lives in St. Louis, where her husband is on the faculty of Washington University in St. Louis. She is routinely interviewed and invited to speak on the subject of military brats. She collaborates with Marc Curtis of the Military Brat Registry to present workshops for military brats around the country and on annual cruises. She is the founder and president of Brightwell Publishing, the first publishing house dedicated to books and films that explore and strengthen military brat cultural identity, and writes The Military Brat Blog.

== Book and Other Writing ==
Wertsch wrote the book Military Brats: Legacies of Growing Up Inside the Fortress (1991) that studied and analyzed the lives of 80 American military brats. Through this process, her book identifies military brats as a hidden American subculture, and details patterns in this population along sociological and psychological lines.

Wertsch is currently writing a second book that also discusses military brats, but includes discussion of other types of third culture children as well. She has stated that the new book will focus on third culture children and the experience of "belonging" as this relates to outsider feelings held widely by this population.

== Operation Footlocker ==
Wertsch, along with Reta Jones Nicholson and Gene Moser, was also behind the inspiration for Operation Footlocker. Operation Footlocker is a mobile monument for military brats, and is currently managed by the Museum of the American Military Family in Albuquerque, New Mexico. There have been as many as three footlockers that travel around the country to brat organizations and gatherings. At each location, people are allowed to view the mementos other brats have contributed, and they are encouraged to place a memento or a written anecdote of their own brat childhood in the footlocker. When the locker is filled, it is emptied and the contents are safely stored in the MAMF museum archives, and brought out for exhibits honoring the millions of children who have been and will be shaped by this unique way of life.

== Documentary ==
In 2006, Army brat and filmmaker Donna Musil completed a documentary film based largely on the research and analysis presented in Wertsch's book, and funded by small monetary and in-kind contributions from military brats to her non-profit organization, Brats without Borders. Musil's film, Brats: Our Journey Home, has been enthusiastically received by military brats nationwide, and is considered a major boost to the military brat cultural identity movement.

== Brightwell Publishing ==
Wertsch is also the founder and CEO of a small publishing house, Brightwell Publishing, that focuses on publishing the works of military brat authors.

== See also ==
- Camp follower
- Global nomad
- Third culture children, also called "third culture kids"
- Military brat (US subculture)
- Military brat, international scope, describes military brat subcultures in several English speaking nations
- Military history
- Military slang
- Military sociology
- Nomads, includes modern nomadic subcultures
- Social psychology
- The Great Santini, film about American Marine brats
- War Child
