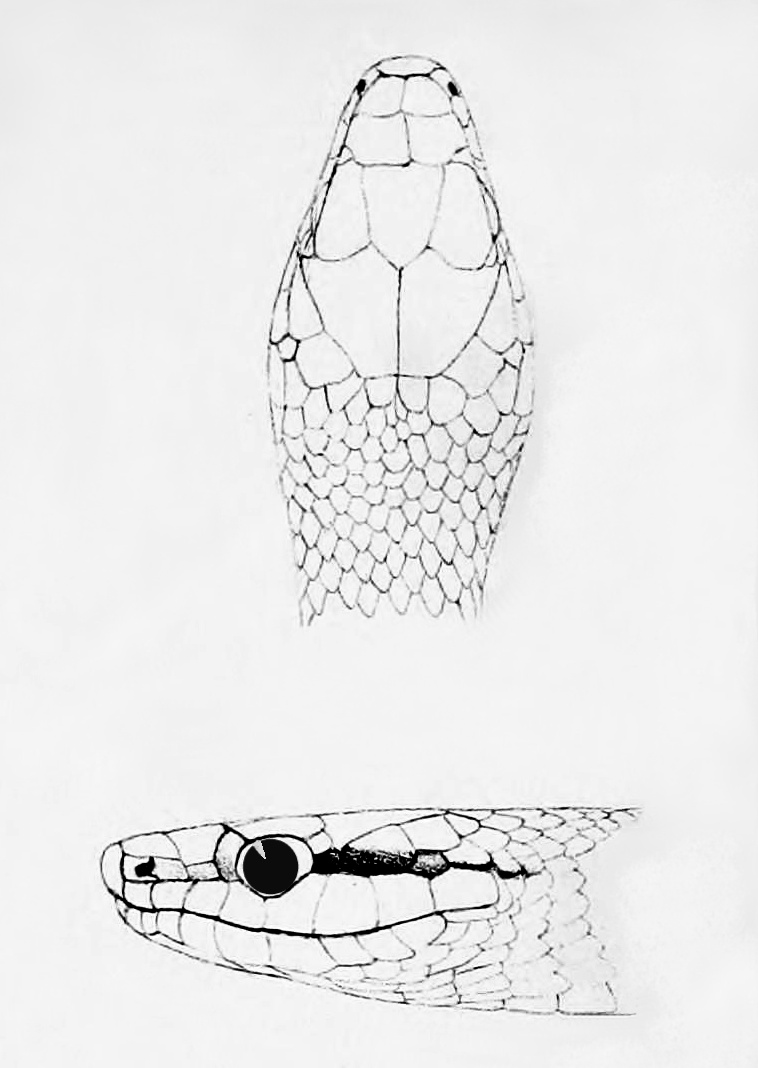

Conservation status
- Vulnerable (IUCN 3.1)

Scientific classification
- Kingdom: Animalia
- Phylum: Chordata
- Class: Reptilia
- Order: Squamata
- Suborder: Serpentes
- Family: Colubridae
- Genus: Leptophis
- Species: L. modestus

Binomial name
- Leptophis modestus (Günther, 1872)

Synonyms
- Ahætulla modesta Günther, 1872; Philothamnus modestus — Cope, 1886; Leptophis modestus — Boulenger, 1894

= Leptophis modestus =

Species of snake

Leptophis modestus, known commonly as the cloud forest parrot snake, is a species of snake in the family Colubridae. It is endemic to Mesoamerica, where it lives in mountain forests.

== Taxonomy ==
The first description of the species was published by Albert Günther in 1872, then under the name Abaetulla modesta. He redesignated the species, giving it its current name, in 1894.

The name modestus means moderate in Latin. According to James R. McCranie, it's uncertain why Günther choose this name, but that it may be referring to the moderate eye size of the species, which Günther mentioned in his description of it.

There are currently no recognized subspecies.

== Description ==
The type specimen of Leptophis modestus is 130 cm (51 in) in total length, and has a 54 cm (21 in) tail. Males of the species can reach lengths of up to 175.5 cm (69.1 in).

Dorsally, it is olive-green. There is a blackish streak behind each eye, and the lips and throat are yellowish. Ventrally, it is pale green.

The dorsal scales are arranged in 15 rows at midbody, strongly keeled except for the first row (adjacent to the ventrals) and on the tail.

Males have 168–178 ventral scales and 171–186 subcaudal scales, while females have 173–183 ventral scales and 166–179 subcaudal scales. The snake's anal plate is divided.

== Distribution and habitat ==
Leptophis modestus can be found in the mountain forests of southern Mexico, central Guatemala, northwestern El Salvador and southwestern Honduras, at elevations of 1,335–2,590 metres (4,380–8,497 ft) The types of forest the snake inhabits include rainforests, humid oak and pine forests, sweetgum forests, evergreen cloud forests and hardwood cloud forests.

== Conservation status ==
It is currently considered a threatened species. Habitat loss due to deforestation has led to a decrease in population numbers.
