= Leptophis urostictus =

Scientific classification
- Kingdom: Animalia
- Phylum: Chordata
- Class: Reptilia
- Order: Squamata
- Suborder: Serpentes
- Family: Colubridae
- Genus: Leptophis
- Species: L. urostictus

Binomial name
- Leptophis urostictus (Peters, 1873)

Species of snake

Leptophis urostictus is a species of nonvenomous snake in the family Colubridae. It is found in Colombia.
