= Michelle Ferguson-Cohen =

American author of children's books and screenplays

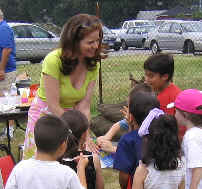
- Born: Ft. Benning, United States
- Occupations: author, illustrator, publisher
- Writing career
- Genre: Children's books
- Notable work: Daddy, You're My Hero!
- Website: www.booksforbrats.com

Michelle Ferguson-Cohen is a children's book author, illustrator, and publisher. Her father is a career military officer and Vietnam veteran. As a military brat herself, many of the picture books she develops are written for and feature military brats.

== Career ==
Ferguson-Cohen wrote, illustrated, and published the first commercially available children's books for military brats and the first children's picture books for children coping with deployment. She has been called the "Dr. Seuss for Military Brats" in a Washington Times article that was laudatory in tone about her books' ability to help children understand about their parent's military deployments.

== Works ==
Ferguson-Cohen established Little Redhaired Girl Publishing to publish her books as part of a series she entitled Books for Brats to encourage pride in the term "Military Brat" outside the military community. Ferguson-Cohen's goal was to create material that would appeal to all children and introduce their military family neighbors. Though self-published, her titles "Daddy, You're My Hero!" and "Mommy, You're My Hero!" have reportedly reached hundreds of thousands of youthful readers through both targeted and broad based marketing. They were first published in 2001 and are now in their 3rd edition. The books have also been used in the classrooms as material to promote tolerance and understanding amongst peers, and distributed to both commercial and civilian outlets.

Books for Brats were early to recognize and service the "suddenly military" families of the National Guard and Reserves. During the first deployments of the Iraq War, Ferguson-Cohen worked with Family Readiness Groups nationwide to host readings. She was able to obtain recommendations by many educational, medical, and child development experts suggesting that her books could be utilized to explain deployment and convey coping skills to children facing separation from a parent. They are also suggested as resources for their unique content, multicultural illustrations, and representations of female soldiers.

Sought out by the press as an expert in the military community, she became an advocate for military brats promoting equal representation for the military community in the media.

Prior to her career as children's author and advocate for military brats, Ferguson-Cohen was a music industry entrepreneur who owned an agency based in New York and London. She represented international DJs including Richie Hawtin, Laurent Garnier, Sven Vath and rock musicians including The Charlatans, Gene and Pet Shop Boys.

During her career in the entertainment industry she was involved celebrity charity events to raise funds for UK-based NGO War Child. A writer and humorist, she is listed as a contributor to the Complete Idiot's Guide to Jokes.

== Bibliography ==
- Daddy, You're My Hero! (Little Redhaired Girl Publishing, 2001) ISBN 978-0-9729264-4-7
- Mommy, You're My Hero! (Little Redhaired Girl Publishing, 2001) ISBN 978-0-9729264-3-0
- Walk This Way, New York Magazine
