= American Studies Association =

Academic association focused on American Studies

- Abbreviation: ASA
- Formation: 1951
- Type: Non-profit organization
- Purpose: Learned society
- Headquarters: Washington D.C., United States
- Fields: American Studies, Ethnic Studies, African American Studies, Asian American Studies, Latino/a Studies, Native American Studies, and many other fields
- President: Shana Redmond
- Affiliations: American Council of Learned Societies, National Humanities Alliance
- Website: theasa.net

The American Studies Association (ASA) is a scholarly organization devoted to the interdisciplinary study of U.S. culture and history. It was founded in 1951 and claims to be the oldest scholarly organization devoted to these topics. The ASA works to promote meaningful dialogue about the United States of America, throughout the U.S. and across the globe. Its purpose is to support scholars and scholarship committed to original research, innovative and effective teaching, critical thinking, and public discussion and debate.

The ASA consists of almost 5,000 individual members along with 2,200 library and other institutional subscribers. It publishes the journal American Quarterly at Johns Hopkins University Press. The concerns and activities of the organization are international in scope.

== History ==
The American Studies Association was founded for purposes of

the promotion of the study of American culture through the encouragement of research, teaching, publication, the strengthening of relations among persons and institutions in this country and abroad devoted to such studies, and the broadening of knowledge among the general public about American culture in all its diversity and complexity.

American studies departments, programs, and centers exist around the world.

== Officers and governance ==
Past presidents of the ASA include Carl Bode (1951–52), Daniel J. Boorstin (1969), Daniel Aaron (1972–73), William H. Goetzmann (1974–75), Janice Radway (1998–99). Recent presidents have included: Curis Marez, Lisa Duggan, David Roediger, Robert Warrior, Kandice Chuh, Roderick Ferguson, and Scott Kurashige (2019-2020).

== Membership ==
Membership is available to any individual with an interest in the study of American culture. Colleges, universities, museums, foundations, societies and other institutions can also be members of the ASA.

== Chapters ==
The ASA includes thirteen chapters:

- The American Studies Association of Texas
- The California American Studies Association
- The Chesapeake American Studies Association
- The Eastern American Studies Association
- The Great Lakes American Studies Association
- The Hawaii American Studies Association
- The Kentucky-Tennessee American Studies Association
- The Mid-America American Studies Association
- The New England American Studies Association
- The New York Metro American Studies Association
- The Pacific Northwest American Studies Association
- The Rocky Mountain American Studies Association
- The Southern American Studies Association

== Publications ==
The ASA regularly produces several publications including:

- The American Quarterly (AQ): Published in March, June, September, and December, the Journal's essays engage with important issues in American studies. It is available online to ASA members and through Project MUSE and JSTOR.
- The ASA E-Newsletter: Published quarterly, this newsletter provides information on programs, publications and opportunities relevant to ASA members, while aiming to promote a broader awareness of the challenges facing the American Studies Community.
- The Encyclopedia of American Studies: An online database featuring over 750 searchable articles. The ASA claims that the "Encyclopedia of American Studies is the leading reference work for the field."

== Annual meetings ==
The annual ASA meeting features speakers and workshops connected to a broad theme important to the field. Recent meetings have been held in Honolulu, Hawaii; San Juan, Puerto Rico; Baltimore, Maryland; Atlanta, Georgia; Chicago, Illinois; Denver, Colorado; Toronto, Canada; Los Angeles, California.

== Prizes and grants ==
The ASA awards a number of prizes and grants including:

- Constance Rourke Prize for the best article in American Quarterly
- Wise-Susman Prize for the best student paper at the annual meeting
- Yasuo Sakakibara Prize for the best paper presented by a scholar at the annual meeting
- Ralph Henry Gabriel Prize for the best dissertation in American Studies
- Lora Romero First Book Publication Prize
- John Hope Franklin Best Book Publication Prize
- Angela Y. Davis Prize for public scholarship
- Mary C. Turpie Prize for teaching, advising and program development in American Studies
- Carl Bode-Norman Holmes Pearson Prize for outstanding contributions to American Studies.

== Boycott of Israeli academic institutions ==
In December 2013, members of ASA voted to join the boycott of all Israeli educational institutions. ASA was strongly criticized and four ASA members, aided by the Louis D. Brandeis Center for Human Rights Under Law, sued the organization but their lawsuit was dismissed. As of 2025, the boycott is ongoing.
