= Leptophis praestans =

Scientific classification
- Kingdom: Animalia
- Phylum: Chordata
- Class: Reptilia
- Order: Squamata
- Suborder: Serpentes
- Family: Colubridae
- Genus: Leptophis
- Species: L. praestans

Binomial name
- Leptophis praestans (Cope, 1868)

Species of snake

Leptophis praestans is a species of nonvenomous snake in the family Colubridae. It is found in Belize.
