= Scott Kurashige =

Ethnic studies professor

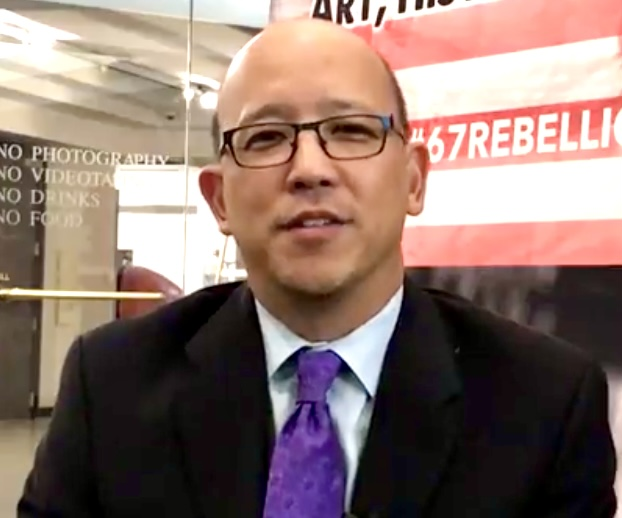
- Kurashige in 2017
- Citizenship: United States
- Occupation: Professor
- Spouse: Emily P. Lawsin
- Children: 1

Academic background
- Education: University of Pennsylvania; University of California, Los Angeles

Academic work
- Discipline: Asian American studies
- Institutions: Texas Christian University

Scott Kurashige is an interdisciplinary scholar of race and ethnic studies, currently serving as an adjunct instructor at the University of Washington. Prior to that, he was a Professor and Chair of Comparative Race and Ethnic Studies at Texas Christian University. He is author of The Shifting Grounds of Race: Black and Japanese Americans in the Making of Multiethnic Los Angeles (2008) and The Fifty-Year Rebellion: How the U.S. Political Crisis Began in Detroit (2017). With Grace Lee Boggs, he co-authored The Next American Revolution: Sustainable Activism for the Twenty-First Century (2011) and was also a co-author and co-editor of Exiled to Motown: A History of Japanese Americans in Detroit (Detroit Japanese American Citizens League, 2015).

== Early life, education and family ==
Kurashige grew up in Los Angeles. He earned a BA in history with minors in Afro-American studies and economics from the University of Pennsylvania in 1990. In 1996, he earned two MAs, in history and Asian American studies, from the University of California, Los Angeles, then his PhD in history, also from UCLA, in 2000.

In July 1999, Kurashige married Emily P. Lawsin in Los Angeles. They had a child in 2014.

== Career ==
From 2000 to 2014, Kurashige taught at the University of Michigan, where he was promoted to full professor. In 2008 he published The Shifting Grounds of Race: Black and Japanese Americans in the Making of Multiethnic Los Angeles (Princeton University Press), a study of 20th century Los Angeles focusing on the relationships (sometimes collaborative, sometimes conflictual) between African Americans and Japanese Americans as they struggled to advance in a city that prided itself on whiteness. He looks at factors like race, economics and foreign policy to map the transformation of Los Angeles from a white city to a global one. In the Journal of Social History, Sarah Schrank called it “a smart and provocative book” as well as “a necessarily sharp corrective to contemporary celebrations of 21st century Los Angeles as…a beacon of multiculturalism.”

In 2011, Kurashige served as co-author to Grace Lee Boggs on the book The Next American Revolution: Sustainable Activism for the Twenty-First Century (University of California Press). The book looks back on Boggs' life as well as forward, offering a hopeful view of activism for the 21st century.

With Lawsin, Kurashige helped develop the program in Asian/Pacific Islander American studies at Michigan.

In 2013 Kurashige was removed as head of the program after he criticized the school’s treatment of students and faculty of color. He left the University of Michigan in 2014. In 2016, he and Lawsin brought a discrimination and later defamation suit against the university with Kurashige alleging he was forced out and Lawsin alleging she was punished after taking medical leave to care for their infant.

From 2014 to 2020, Kurashige taught at the University of Washington Bothell, where he was Professor in the School of Interdisciplinary Arts and Sciences and Senior Advisor for Faculty Diversity and Initiatives to the Vice Chancellor for Academic Affairs. In 2017 he published The Fifty-Year Rebellion: How the U.S. Political Crisis Began in Detroit (University of California Press). In it he argues that transformations in Detroit, particularly a neoliberal backlash to the 1967 unrest, anticipated the same trends in the United States more broadly, trends he argues led to the election of Donald Trump in 2016.

In 2019-2020, Kurashige was president of the American Studies Association. In 2020, he joined Texas Christian University as Professor and Chair of Comparative Race and Ethnic Studies, serving in this role until 2022.
