= Lora Beldon =

American artist

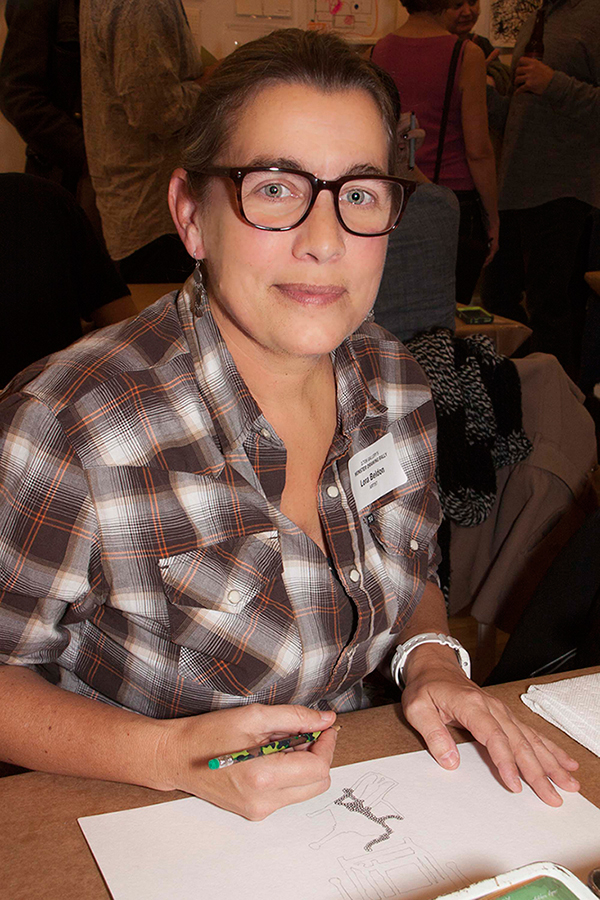
Lora Beldon

Lora Beldon is an American artist, curator, and arts educator. Her primary body of work explores the culture, history, and the effect of combat PTSD on U.S. military brats. She is founder of the Military Kid Art Project (MKAP), which provides customized art programming for military children and teens. She lives and works in Richmond, Virginia.

In 2010, Beldon teamed up with writer/filmmaker Donna Musil, Executive Director of Brats Without Borders, to curate UNCLASSIFIED: The Military Kid Art Show, a traveling museum exhibit exploring the life of a military child through art, to educate and raise awareness of the military brat subculture and its life-long impact on an individual. In 2012, UNCLASSIFIED: The Military Kid Art Show was one of six Newman's Own Award winners given to community organizations that break the mold and create innovative programs that improve the quality of life for military families, past and present. The award was presented at the Pentagon by the Chairman of the U.S. Joint Chiefs of Staff, General Martin Dempsey. UNCLASSIFIED: The Military Kid Art Show has been on exhibit at museums and educational institutions around the country since 2013.

In 2015, Beldon and Musil co-founded the BRAT Art Institute (BAI), a multidisciplinary art organization for individuals who grew up in military families. BAI's first annual Military BRAT Art Camp for military teens will be held at Old Dominion University in Norfolk, Virginia in the summer of 2016. The camp was developed and will be taught by professional artists who were also raised in military families. The purpose of the camp is to encourage military teens to explore their feelings and military brat culture through creativity.

== Early life ==
Like most military children, Beldon moved around the country with her Marine Corps family. Her father, Ltc. Tom Beldon (Retired), a folk artist, served two combat tours in Vietnam, the first as an infantry platoon leader, the second as a company commander, and was awarded multiple Bronze Stars.

The Beldon family is featured in Brats Without Borders's documentary work-in-progress, Our Own Private Battlefield, about the intergenerational effects of combat PTSD on military children, and how the father/daughter artists have used their art to help heal the wounds of the Vietnam War.

== Education ==
Beldon earned a BFA in painting and printmaking from Virginia Commonwealth University in 1989, and returned to VCU in 2005 to study art education.

== Career ==
Beldon served as director and assistant director of 1708 Gallery, one of the oldest artist-run nonprofit galleries in the United States, from 1989-1996, and remains an emeritus member of the gallery. She was art curator for 1708 Gallery's 1991 exhibit Richmond for Life, which brought the work of David Wojnarowicz to Richmond. Wojnarowicz's work would later return to 1708 Gallery in January 2001, after it was removed from the Smithsonian Institution in November 2010 due to its controversial content.

Beldon was also a member of Richmond, Virginia's punk art group, Urban Artists Amalgamated. Her art has been exhibited across the United States and Europe, with several of her pieces in private, corporate, and public collections.

== Exhibitions ==
=== Solo ===
- Final Stage, Hunt Gallery, Staunton, VA (2002)
- "Objects and Obsessions", Coincidence Gallery, Richmond, VA (1999)
- "Angels In My Closet", 1708 Gallery, Richmond, VA (1994)

=== Group ===
- UNCLASSIFIED: The Military Kid Art Show, 2013-present: Hampden-Sydney College, U.S. Space & Rocket Center, Old Dominion University, Lake Placid Center for the Arts, Harford Community College
- "Silent Night", 1708 Gallery, Richmond, VA (2006)
- "and the levee broke: meditations on the power of water", C3-Creative Change Center, Richmond, VA (2005)
- "The Vietnam War, Art Expressions, Then and Now", The Dairy Barn Cultural Art Center, Athens, OH (2000)
- "Mid-Atlantic", Dupont Gallery, University of Mary Washington, Fredericksburg, VA (1997)
- "Diverse Images", Galerie Conti, Bruxelles, Belgium (1995)
- "L'Histoire Sud", Bienville Gallery, New Orleans, LA (1995)
- "Irene Leach Memorial Exhibition", Chrysler Museum of Art, Norfolk, VA (1992)
- "Choice", A.I.R. Gallery, New York, NY (1991)
