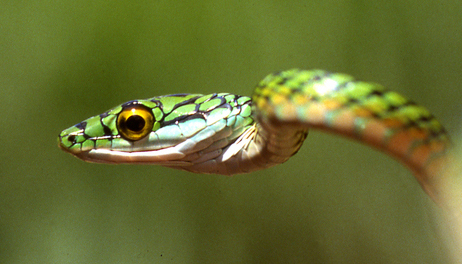
- black-skinned parrot snake

Scientific classification
- Kingdom: Animalia
- Phylum: Chordata
- Class: Reptilia
- Order: Squamata
- Suborder: Serpentes
- Family: Colubridae
- Genus: Leptophis
- Species: L. nigromarginatus

Binomial name
- Leptophis nigromarginatus (Günther, 1866)

Synonyms
- Ahætulla nigromarginata Günther, 1866; Leptophis nigromarginatus — Boulenger, 1894; Leptophis occidentalis nigromarginatus — Schmidt & Walker, 1943; Thalerophis richardi nigromarginatus — Oliver, 1948

= Leptophis nigromarginatus =

Black-skinned parrot snake

Leptophis nigromarginatus, commonly known as the black-skinned parrot snake, is a snake of the family Colubridae.

== Geographic range ==
It is found in the Amazon rainforest in Ecuador.

== Description ==
L. nigromarginatus is a bright green, slender, medium-sized, snake. Adults are typically 60–100 cm (23.5–39.5 in) in total length. Black edges around the outer margin of each scale form a distinctive net-like pattern on the dorsal surface of the animal. The ventral surface has a metallic sheen, and may be green or rust-colored.

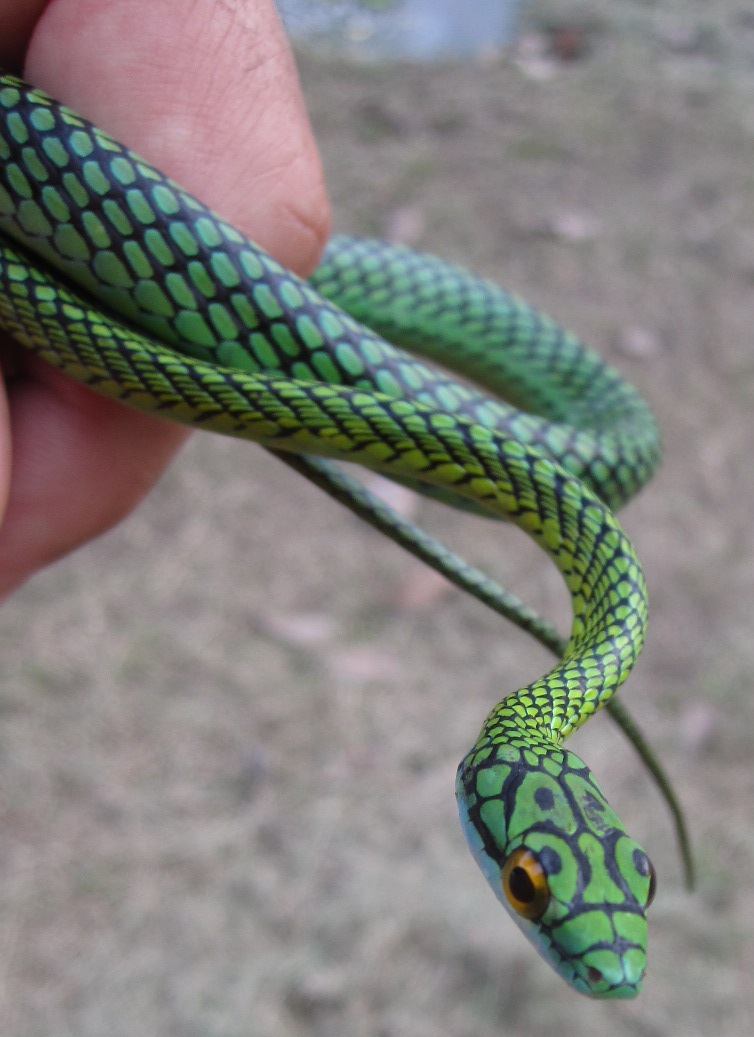
Leptophis ahaetulla nigromarginatus (black-skinned parrot snake), Amazon rainforest, near Nauta, Peru, 2011

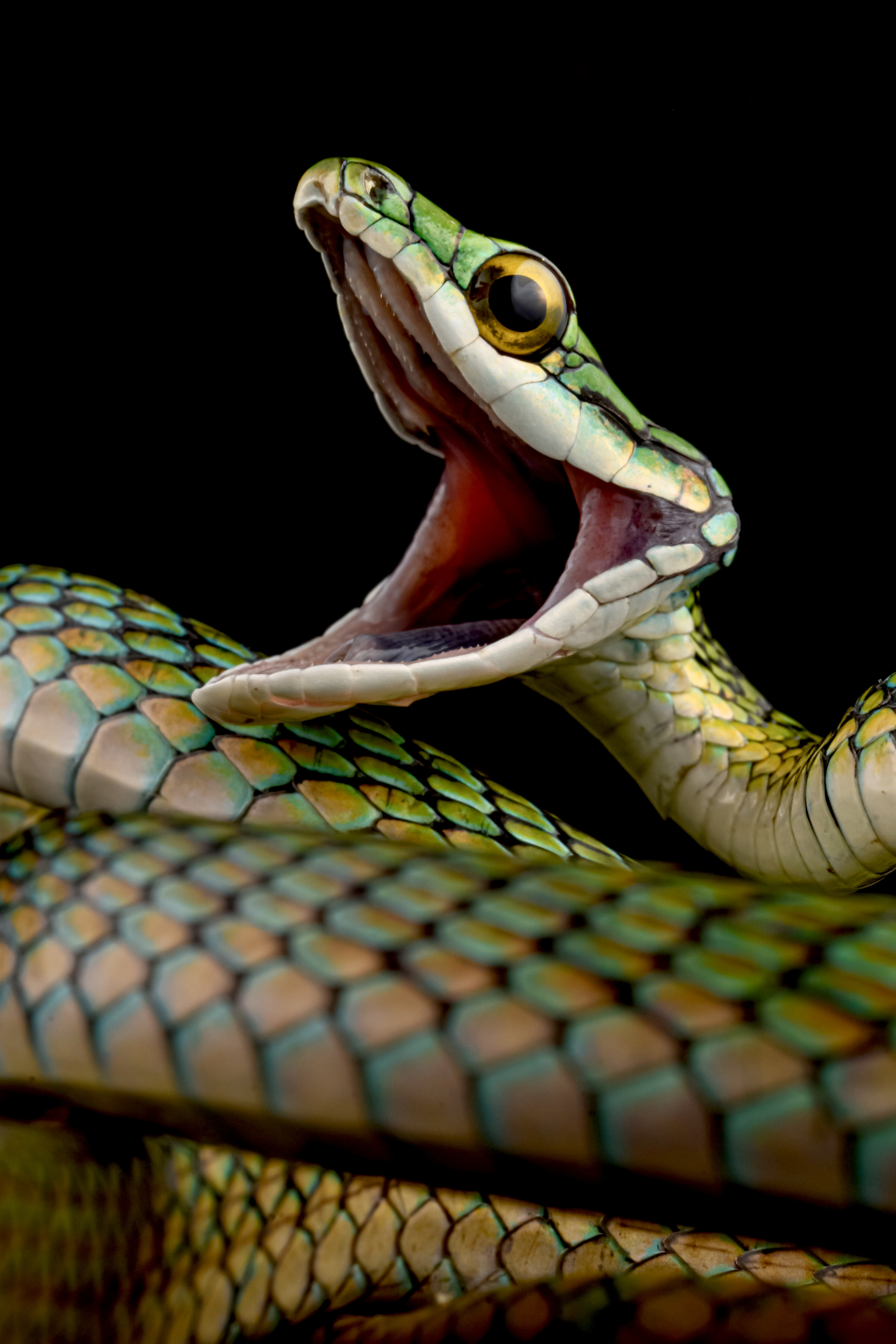

== Habitat ==
It is arboreal, living in dense brushy vegetation. It is found in secondary and primary forest.

== Behavior ==
Active during the daytime, it sleeps in vegetation at night.

== Diet ==
It feeds on lizards, frogs, and small birds.
