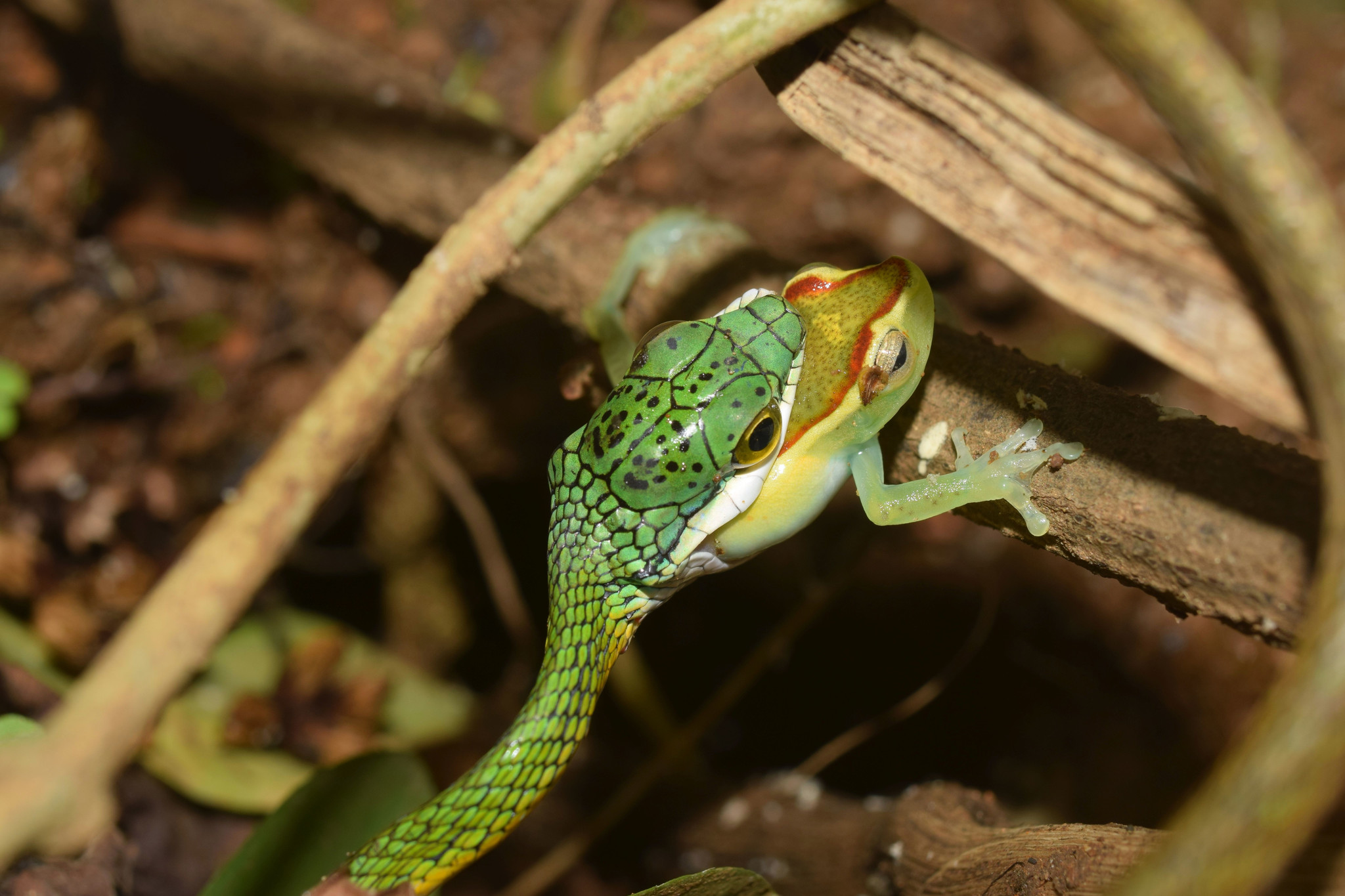
- Eating juvenile palmar tree frog

Scientific classification
- Kingdom: Animalia
- Phylum: Chordata
- Class: Reptilia
- Order: Squamata
- Suborder: Serpentes
- Family: Colubridae
- Genus: Leptophis
- Species: L. bocourti

Binomial name
- Leptophis bocourti Boulenger, 1898

= Leptophis bocourti =

Species of snake

Leptophis bocourti is a species of nonvenomous snake in the family Colubridae. It is found in Ecuador.
