= Carmen Josefina Lora Iglesias =

Dominican revolutionary and lawyer

Carmen Josefina Lora Iglesias (1940 – April 13, 1999), known as Piky Lora, was a Dominican revolutionary and lawyer who was a part of the 14th of June Movement, a political group opposed to the Rafael Trujillo regime. During the guerilla warfare used in the 14th of June movement, Lora was the only woman of 150 participants on the front lines. She also founded the Federation of Dominican Students and the Forge Group, made up of leftist militants.

Born in Santiago, Dominican Republic, Lora grew up during the Trujillo regime. She discovered the 14th of June movement, or “Movimiento Clandestino”, while away at university. She graduated with her doctorate in October 1962.

As part of the 14th of June movement, she was assigned to go between Santo Domingo and San Francisco de Macorís, major Dominican cities. She served as the only woman on the front lines with the guerrilla groups at “Calle Juan de Dios Ventura Simo”. She was one of 24 in her group, and one of 150 overall. After the resistance was defeated in December 1963, Lora surrendered herself to the military, and was arrested in Santo Domingo. After six months in various prisons, she was exiled to Paris, France. She moved from France to Cuba, and trained with the communist military for six months.

She returned in 1965 with seven others who had been exiled following the resistance to Dominican Republic, aware of the risk of being deported or arrested. She was able to stay in the country. At that time, she married Rafael Solano.

After briefly organizing civilians for an armed resistance, Lora returned to Santiago in 1966 and started practicing law. She was chiefly interested in land legislation, and fought to return land to citizens when it had been stolen by private, wealthy individuals. She was one of the most “prestigious” lawyers in the Dominican Republic.

She is honored at the “Museo de la Resistencia Dominicana” in Santo Domingo, Dominican Republic.

Lora died at the age of 58 on April 13, 1999. Her brother, Huchi Lora, was awarded the President’s Journalism of the Year Award in 2017.
