= Leptophis cupreus =

Conservation status
- Least Concern (IUCN 3.1)

Scientific classification
- Kingdom: Animalia
- Phylum: Chordata
- Class: Reptilia
- Order: Squamata
- Suborder: Serpentes
- Family: Colubridae
- Genus: Leptophis
- Species: L. cupreus

Binomial name
- Leptophis cupreus (Cope, 1868)

Species of snake

Leptophis cupreus, the copper parrot snake, is a species of nonvenomous snake in the family Colubridae. It is found in Panama, Venezuela, Ecuador, Colombia, and Peru.
