= Leptophis marginatus =

Scientific classification
- Kingdom: Animalia
- Phylum: Chordata
- Class: Reptilia
- Order: Squamata
- Suborder: Serpentes
- Family: Colubridae
- Genus: Leptophis
- Species: L. marginatus

Binomial name
- Leptophis marginatus (Cope, 1862)

Species of snake

Leptophis marginatus is a species of nonvenomous snake in the family Colubridae. It is found in Paraguay, Uruguay, and Argentina.
