= Leptophis riveti =

Conservation status
- Least Concern (IUCN 3.1)

Scientific classification
- Kingdom: Animalia
- Phylum: Chordata
- Class: Reptilia
- Order: Squamata
- Suborder: Serpentes
- Family: Colubridae
- Genus: Leptophis
- Species: L. riveti

Binomial name
- Leptophis riveti Despax, 1910

Species of snake

Leptophis riveti, Despax's parrot snake, is a species of nonvenomous snake in the family Colubridae. It is found in Costa Rica, Panama, Ecuador, Peru, Colombia, and Trinidad.
