= Lora Romero =

American assistant professor of English at Stanford University

- Born: March 23, 1960; Chino, California, US
- Died: October 10, 1997 (aged 37); San Mateo County, California, US
- Occupation: Professor

Lora Patricia Romero was an American assistant professor of English at Stanford University. She specialized in 19th and 20th century American literature, Chicano/a cultural studies, and gender theory.

== Life and work ==
Romero was born in Chino, California in 1960. She graduated from Stanford University and earned her master's and doctoral degrees from the University of California, Berkeley. Romero was a former Ford Foundation Postdoctoral Fellow and also served as a member of the National Council of the American Studies Association. She taught at Princeton University and the University of Texas before accepting a position in the Stanford English Department in 1993.

Her first and only book, Home Fronts: Domesticity and Its Critics in the United States, 1820-1870, was published by Duke University Press and appeared in print just days after her death.

== Legacy ==
The American Studies Association annually awards the Lora Romero First Book Prize in her honor.

The University of Texas at Austin offers a scholarship entitled the Lora Romero Memorial Award for Interdisciplinary Research in Race, Ethnicity and Gender.
