= Johan Lora =

Dominican footballer

Personal information
- Date of birth: 20 October 1982 (age 44)
- Position: Midfielder

Team information
- Current team: Lincoln University

Youth career
- 2008–: Lincoln University

International career^{‡}
Years	Team	Apps	(Gls)
2008	Dominican Republic	1	(0)
- ‡ National team caps and goals as of 22:51, 1 January 2011 (UTC)

Johan Lora (born 20 October 1982) is a Dominican international footballer who plays college soccer in the United States for Lincoln University, playing as a midfielder.

== Career ==
Lora has played college soccer for Lincoln University since 2008.

Lora also earned one cap for the Dominican Republic national team in March 2008.
