= Leptophis occidentalis =

Scientific classification
- Kingdom: Animalia
- Phylum: Chordata
- Class: Reptilia
- Order: Squamata
- Suborder: Serpentes
- Family: Colubridae
- Genus: Leptophis
- Species: L. occidentalis

Binomial name
- Leptophis occidentalis (Günther, 1859)

Species of snake

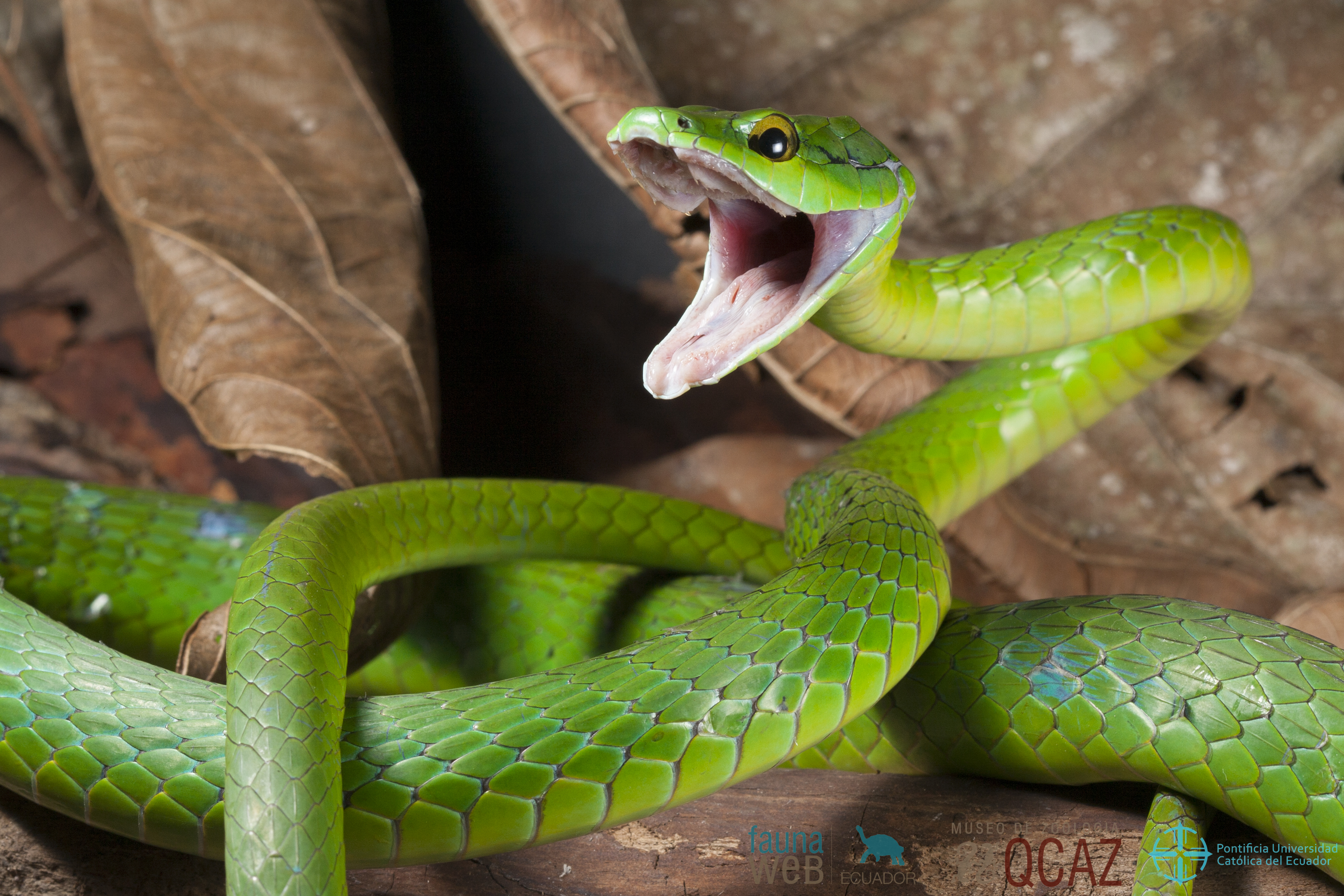

Leptophis occidentalis is a species of nonvenomous snake in the family Colubridae. It is found in Honduras, Costa Rica, Panama, Venezuela, and Colombia.
