= Leptophis dibernardoi =

Scientific classification
- Kingdom: Animalia
- Phylum: Chordata
- Class: Reptilia
- Order: Squamata
- Suborder: Serpentes
- Family: Colubridae
- Genus: Leptophis
- Species: L. dibernardoi

Binomial name
- Leptophis dibernardoi Albuquerque, Santos, Borges-Nojosa, & R. Ávila, 2022

Species of snake

Leptophis dibernardoi is a species of nonvenomous snake in the family Colubridae. It is found in Brazil.
