= Donna Musil =

American film director

- Born: April 15, 1960 (age 66)
- Education: Journalism, AB; Law, JD
- Alma mater: University of Georgia
- Occupation: Documentary filmmaker
- Notable work: Brats: Our Journey Home

Donna Lynn Musil (born April 15, 1960) is an American documentary filmmaker, writer, and activist exploring the subculture of U.S. military brats. She wrote and directed the 2006 documentary Brats: Our Journey Home, a film about growing up the child of a military family and the effect it has on that child's adult life. She is also the founder of Brats Without Borders, a nonprofit organization dedicated to increasing awareness, celebration, and support for military brats and other third culture children.

The feature-length documentary is narrated by singer-songwriter Kris Kristofferson and features interviews with General H. Norman Schwarzkopf, author Mary Edwards Wertsch, psychotherapist Stephanie Donaldson Pressman, and numerous other adult brats, aged 20 to 70. The film has been screened in over 100 locations around the United States, and has to date been screened at 21 film festivals, winning five awards.

Musil is also a journalist and attorney by trade. An expert in the field of military brat studies, Musil conducts extensive Q&A sessions after screenings of her film and speaks on the topic with a variety of audiences, including current and adult brats, military, educational, corporate, and mental health care professionals.

== Early life ==
Musil was born into a career Army family on April 15, 1960. By the time she was eight, her father, Ltc. Louis F. Musil (deceased), a JAG lawyer and judge, had been away two years of her life, in the Vietnam War. Musil grew up in the very mobile lifestyle of an Army brat, moving frequently and never having a hometown. By the time she was sixteen, Musil had moved twelve times and lived on three different continents, including living in Georgia, Virginia, North Carolina, Korea, Germany, Kentucky, and San Francisco.

Musil attended three different high schools, her Ninth grade was spent at Taegu American High School in Taegu, Korea - her tenth grade at Ft. Knox, Kentucky - and after her father died of cancer two months after her 16th birthday, she finished her third and final year of high school at Columbus High School in Columbus, Georgia (graduating early).

She graduated from the University of Georgia with an A.B. in Journalism in 1981 and a Juris Doctor degree in 1985, and is a member of the State Bar of Georgia.

== Career ==
Musil's career has included journalism, law, documentary film-making, and writing. She worked as an on-air radio news director, an attorney with the AFL-CIO and the International Brotherhood of Electrical Workers, and an executive assistant with Sony Pictures and Castle Rock Entertainment, before pursuing a full-time independent writing and filmmaking career in 1994.

She has served on the Board of Directors for Women in Film/Atlanta, and has won writer's fellowships to the Hambidge Center in Georgia, Fundacion Valparaiso in Spain, the Helene Wurlitzer Foundation in Taos, New Mexico, and Centrum Arts in Port Townsend, Washington. The Executive Director of the nonprofit organization Brats Without Borders, Musil currently lives in middle Georgia.

== Brats: Our Journey Home ==
Brats: Our Journey Home is a documentary on the subculture of American military brats.

=== Conceptualization ===
The idea for Brats: Our Journey Home took root during Musil's impromptu reunion with her Taegu American High School friends in Washington, DC in 1997. She then read all of the research available at the time, including Mary Edwards Wertsch's groundbreaking book Military Brats: Legacies of Childhood Inside the Fortress, and Stephanie Donaldson Pressman's The Narcissistic Family, which Musil reports, opened her eyes as to "why I was the way I was." Over the next 5 years, Musil conducted her own independent research, interviewing over 500 military brats of all ages, races, religions, and branches of service, along with other experts in the field, including Wertsch and Pressman.

=== Reception ===
The documentary premiered at the Rhode Island International Film Festival in August 2006. It has to date been invited to 21 film festivals, winning five film awards. It continues to be shown in and near American and Canadian military communities in the U.S., Canada, and also at many locations on or near U.S. military bases overseas. Musil has announced that The Military Channel is planning to air the documentary in the near future.

== Brats Without Borders ==
Musil is also the founder of Brats Without Borders, a nonprofit organization dedicated to promoting awareness of the lives, culture, issues, and needs of current and former military brats. In 2008, Brats Without Borders launched the "BRATS Support Network & Discussion Forum", an on-line forum for brats and third culture kids of all ages. Musil continues to amass data on the effects of growing up military.

== See also ==
- Camp follower
- Military sociology
