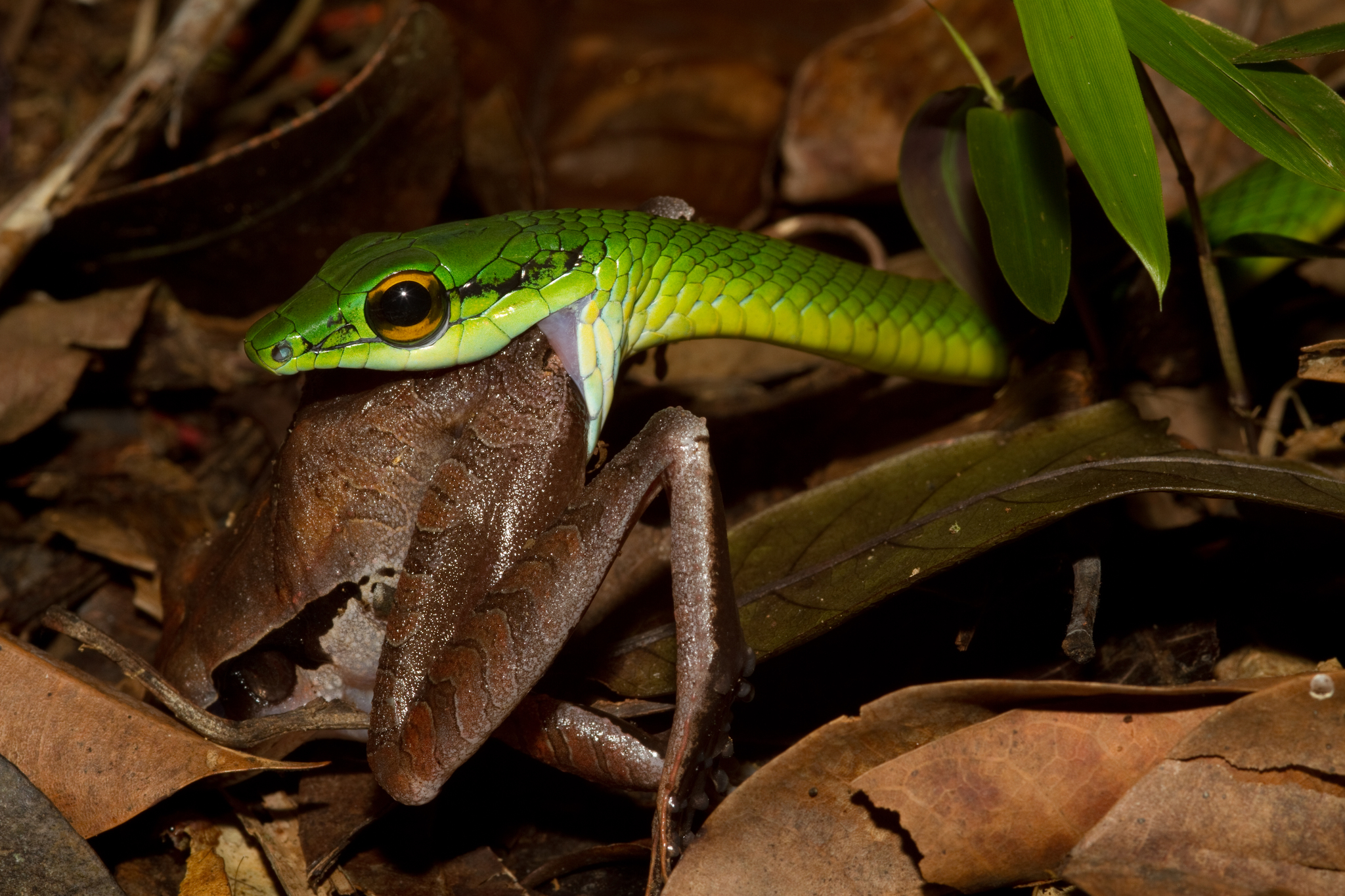
- Eating a frog

Conservation status
- Least Concern (IUCN 3.1)

Scientific classification
- Kingdom: Animalia
- Phylum: Chordata
- Class: Reptilia
- Order: Squamata
- Suborder: Serpentes
- Family: Colubridae
- Genus: Leptophis
- Species: L. depressirostris

Binomial name
- Leptophis depressirostris (Cope, 1861)

= Leptophis depressirostris =

Species of snake

Leptophis depressirostris, commonly known as Cope's parrot snake, is a species of nonvenomous snake in the family Colubridae. It is found in Nicaragua, Honduras, Costa Rica, Panama, Ecuador, Colombia, and Peru.

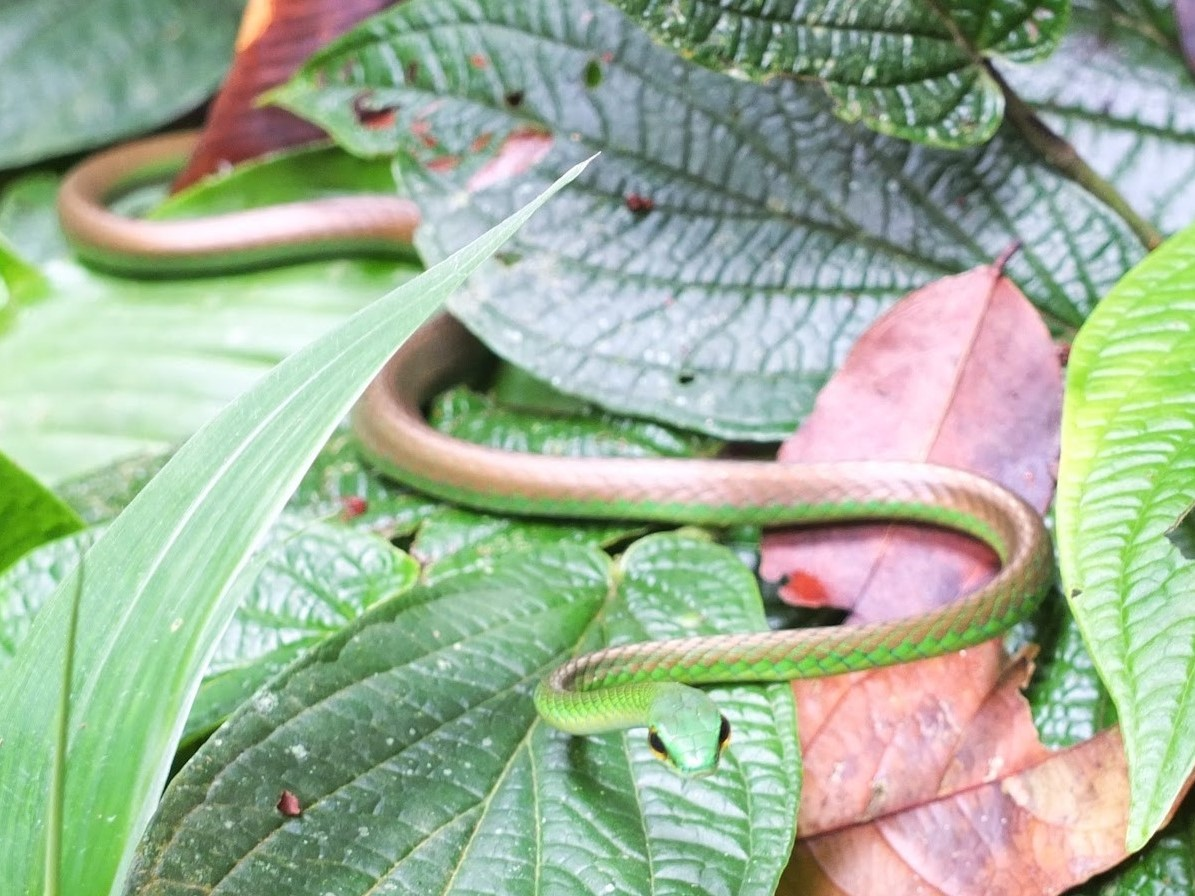
