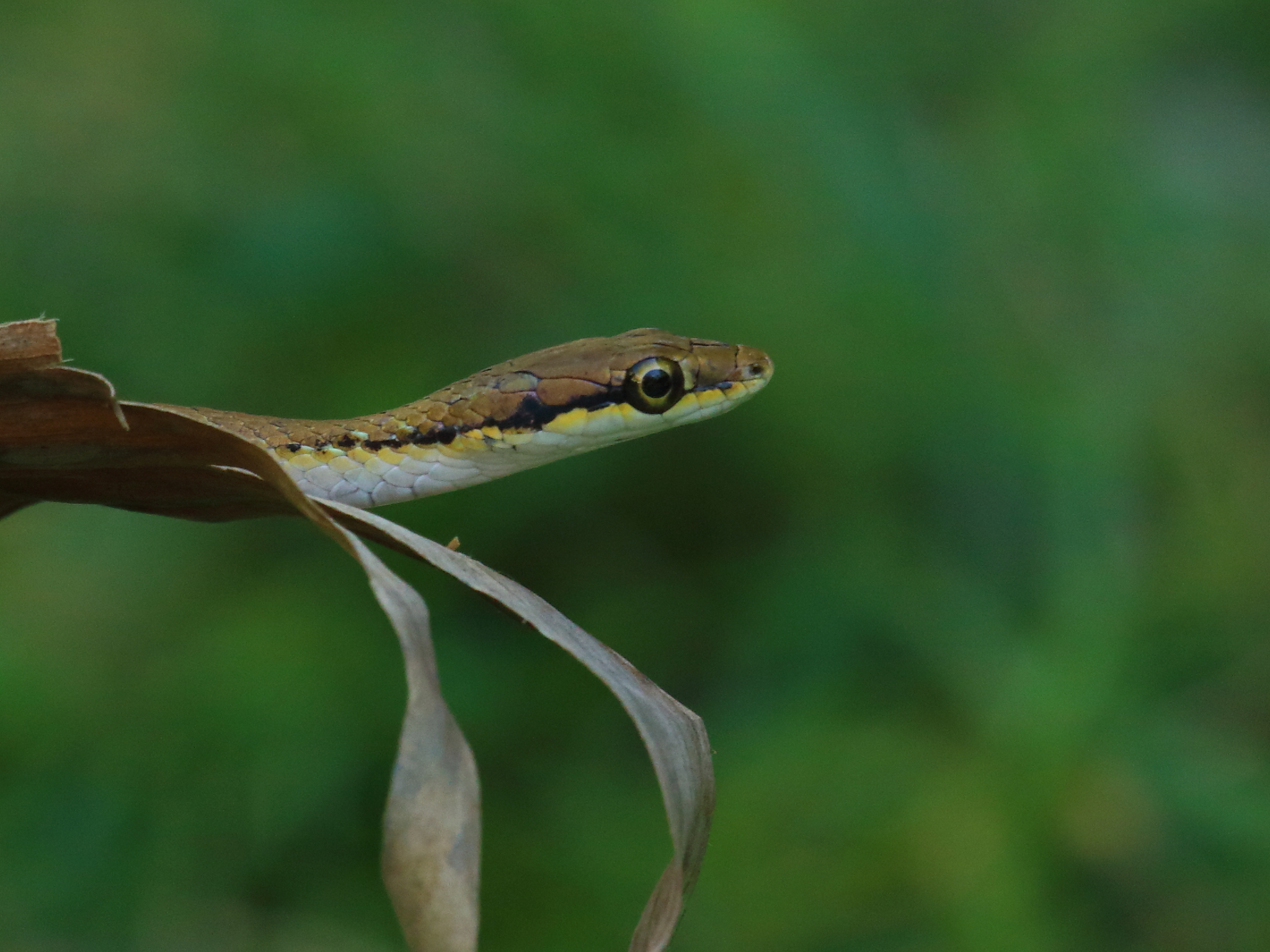
- in Paria Forest, Trinidad

Conservation status
- Least Concern (IUCN 3.1)

Scientific classification
- Kingdom: Animalia
- Phylum: Chordata
- Class: Reptilia
- Order: Squamata
- Suborder: Serpentes
- Family: Colubridae
- Genus: Leptophis
- Species: L. stimsoni

Binomial name
- Leptophis stimsoni Harding, 1995

= Leptophis stimsoni =

Species of snake

Leptophis stimsoni, commonly known as the grey lora or the Trinidad upland parrot snake, is a small species of snake in the family Colubridae. The species is endemic to the Republic of Trinidad and Tobago.

== Geographic range and habitat ==
L. stimsoni is known from less than a dozen specimens, all of which were collected in montane forests in the Northern Range on the Island of Trinidad, at altitudes of 300–800 m (980–2,620 ft).

== Reproduction ==
L. stimsoni is oviparous.

== Etymology ==
The specific name, stimsoni, is in honor of British herpetologist Andrew Francis Stimson.
