= Jason Ruiz =

American studies professor

- Occupation: Associate professor
- Language: English
- Citizenship: American
- Notable works: Narcomedia, Americans in the Treasure House

Jason Ruiz is a researcher of American and Latino culture. He works as an associate professor of American Studies at the University of Notre Dame.

Ruiz's opinions have been featured on ABC News and The New York Times. He has published several books on Latino and American culture.
