= Flaviopolis (Lydia) =

Ancient Roman Town

- Φλαβιόπολις / Φλαοϋιόπολις (Ancient Greek)
- Phlaouiopolis; Lora
- Location within Turkey
- 38°50′47″N 28°06′41″E
- Type: Ancient town
- Location: Near Şahankaya, Turkey
- Region: Ancient Lydia

Flaviopolis (Ancient Greek: Φλαβιόπολις or Φλαοϋιόπολις), or Phlaouiopolis, also known as Lora, was a town of ancient Lydia, inhabited during Roman times.

Its site is located near Şahankaya in Asiatic Turkey.
