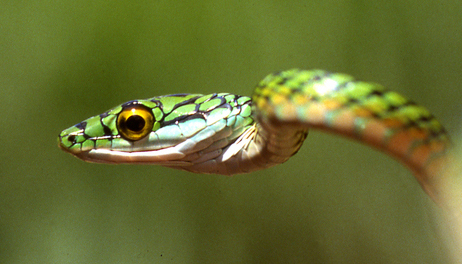

Conservation status
- Least Concern (IUCN 3.1)

Scientific classification
- Kingdom: Animalia
- Phylum: Chordata
- Class: Reptilia
- Order: Squamata
- Suborder: Serpentes
- Family: Colubridae
- Genus: Leptophis
- Species: L. ahaetulla

Binomial name
- Leptophis ahaetulla (Linnaeus, 1758)

Synonyms
- Coluber ahaetulla Linnaeus, 1758; Coluber filiformis Linnaeus, 1758; Coluber liocercus Wied, 1824; Leptophis ahaetulla — Bell, 1825; Ahaetulla liocercus — Gray, 1831; Dendrophis liocercus — Schlegel, 1837; Leptophis liocercus — A.M.C. Duméril, Bibron & A.H.A. Duméril, 1854; Thrasops ahaetulla — Cope, 1860; Ahaetulla ahaetulla — W. Peters, 1873; Leptophis ahaetulla — ICZN, 1958

= Leptophis ahaetulla =

Species of snake

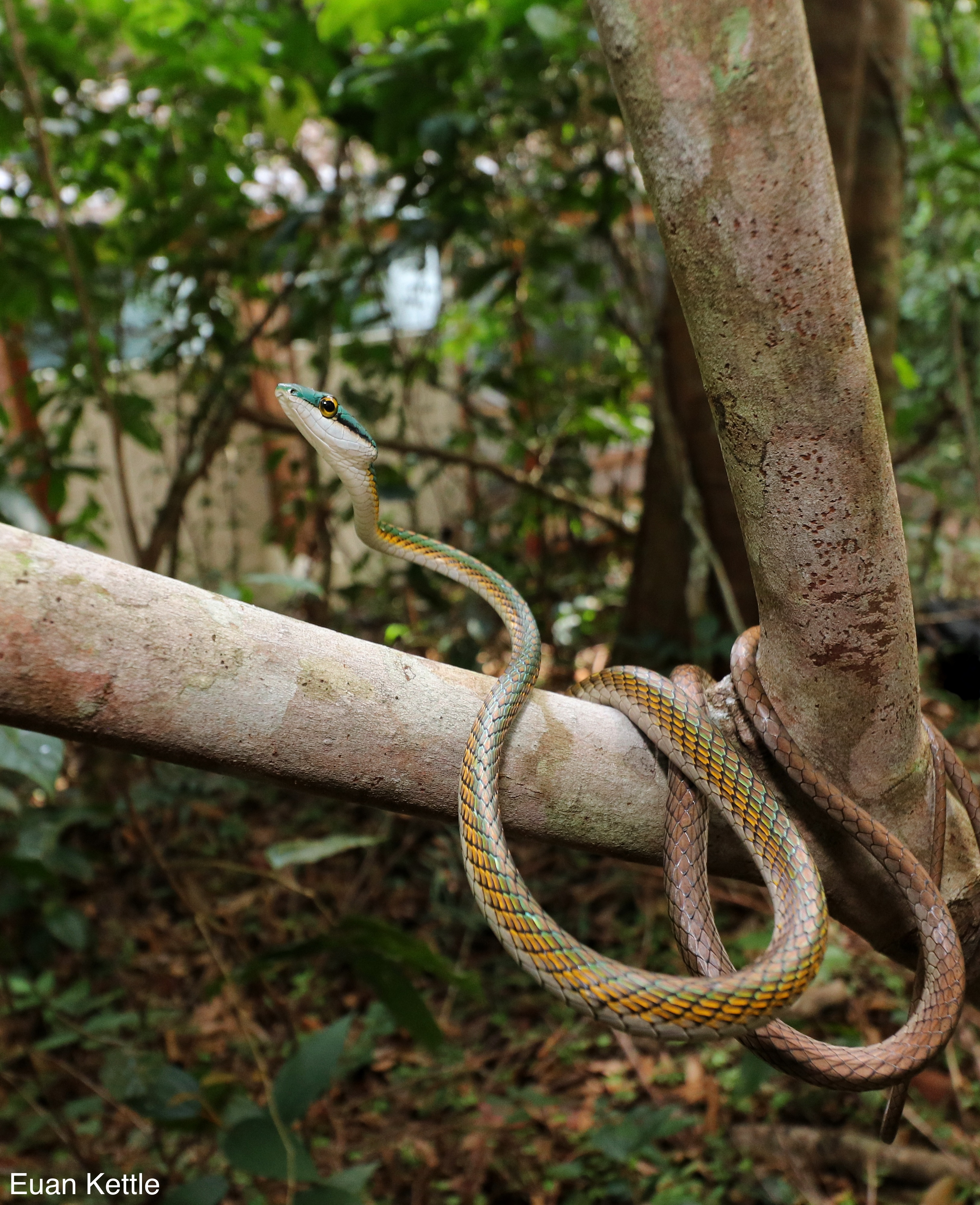

Leptophis ahaetulla, commonly known as the lora or parrot snake, is a species of medium-sized slender snake of the family Colubridae. The species is native to Central America and northern South America.

== Geographic range ==
In Central America L. ahaetulla is found in Belize, Costa Rica, El Salvador, Guatemala, Honduras, southern Mexico, Nicaragua, and Panama. In South America it is found in Argentina, Bolivia, Brazil, Colombia, Ecuador, French Guiana, Paraguay, Peru, Trinidad and Tobago, Uruguay, and Venezuela.

== Description ==
Adults of L. ahaetulla may attain a total length of 172 cm (68 in), which includes a tail 59 cm (23 in) long.

Dorsally, L. ahaetulla is bright green, golden, or bronzy. The keels of the dorsal scales are black or dark brown. The head shields and the dorsal scales may be edged with black. On each side of the head is a black streak which passes through the eye. The upper lip and the belly are white or yellow. The species was thought to be non-venomous, but it is mildly venomous with localized pain, swelling and a feeling of "pins and needles" being the symptoms of envenomation. Symptoms disappear after a few hours.

The head is elongated and distinct from the neck. The eye is large with a round pupil. The body is slender, and the tail is long.

The dorsal scales are arranged in 15 rows at mid-body and are strongly keeled except in the first row on each side (the row adjacent to the ventrals), where they are smooth. They are also smooth on the neck and tail.

The ventrals, which number 151-167, are strongly angulate at the sides. The anal plate is divided. The subcaudals number 140-173, and are divided.

The loreal scale is absent, and the prefrontals extend through the loreal region to contact the upper labials. There are usually 2 postoculars, and the temporals are 1 + 2. There are 8-9 upper labials, of which the 4th & 5th (or 5th & 6th) enter the eye. The anterior chin shields are shorter than the posterior chin shields.

== Diet ==
L. ahaetulla feeds on small birds and their eggs, lizards, frogs and their eggs, and insects such as grasshoppers. It is also known to show cannibalism and feed on other snakes which is a rare behaviour.
