= James Arthur Oliver =

American zoologist

James Arthur Oliver (January 1, 1914 – December 2, 1981) was an American zoologist, herpetologist and educator who served as the director of the American Museum of Natural History, the New York Zoological Park (now the Bronx Zoo) and the New York Aquarium.

== Early life, education and career beginnings ==
Oliver was born in Caruthersville, Missouri before moving to St. Louis aged two when his father, a lawyer, was appointed a United States district attorney there. Fascinated with reptiles at an early age, Oliver during his teenage years would go on snake-hunting trips with Marlin Perkins, then the curator of reptiles at Saint Louis Zoo.

Oliver's appreciation of nature was based on the appeal that animals, particularly reptiles and amphibians, held for him. He saw them as wondrous in their own right and in the context of our planet's natural environment. He had a deep commitment to conservation of the environment for the sake of both the animals and people.

By the time Oliver attended university, he was interested in becoming a herpetologist. In 1932, he attended the University of Texas in Austin before transferring two years later to the University of Michigan in Ann Arbor, where he obtained his B.A. in 1936 and his M.A. degree in 1937. He continued his studies as a University Fellow from 1938 to 1940 and as a Hinsdale Scholar in 1940-1941 and completed courses for his Ph.D. in zoology which was conferred to him in 1942.

Whilst in graduate school, Oliver went on two expeditions to south Mexico to bring back reptiles for the University of Michigan's museum of zoology, where he was an assistant.

Oliver taught for a year, 1941–1942, as an instructor at the Northern Michigan College of Education in Marquette, before moving to New York City and becoming assistant curator in the herpetology department at the American Museum of Natural History (AMNH).

== World War II ==
During World War II, Oliver took a leave of absence from the museum and served in the Navy as a communications officer aboard a destroyer from 1943 to 1946. He served in the Atlantic and Pacific theaters and participated in the Allied invasion of Normandy on D-Day.

During the war, when time permitted, Oliver studied and collected reptiles and amphibians; one of his observations being a record number of sea turtles, seen from his vessel, off the coast of Mexico. He "pickled" specimens in his quarters and collected wall lizards in Malta, chameleons in Africa, frogs in Trinidad and sea snakes at Okinawa.

== Professorship and the Bronx Zoo ==
After his discharge from the Navy, Oliver stayed at the AMNH for one more year, being promoted in 1947 to assistant curator of herpetology. Oliver then joined University of Florida in Gainesville as assistant professor; however he kept up his association to the AMNH as a research associate for the next 11 years.

From Florida, in 1951, he moved to the New York Zoological Society at the Bronx Zoo, where he became curator of the reptiles. In April 1958 he became assistant director of the zoo and director in June the same year.

One of his greatest achievements at the zoo was overseeing the renovation of the Reptile House. He designed glass-fronted exhibits and created an environment that displayed reptiles and amphibians in surroundings that closely as possible simulated nature.

== American Museum of Natural History and New York Aquarium ==
Oliver became the director of the AMNH in 1959, replacing Dr. Albert E. Parr who became a full-time senior scientist at the museum.

Under his tenure, the museum underwent a major period of growth and activity. Oliver announced in 1960 that a ten-year program of building new exhibition areas and improving new ones would commence. More than a dozen exhibition halls were planned and opened during his tenure, including the permanent halls of Ocean Life and Biology of Fishes, Hall of Man in Africa and changing exhibits such as 'Can Man Survive?' reflecting his interest in biological conservation and its importance for humanity.

Oliver served as director of the museum until 1969; he was then appointed director of the New York Aquarium, a post he held from 1970 to 1976. He then became the Director Emeritus of the AMNH in 1973 and of the Zoological Society in 1977.

He is the only person ever to have held the directorship at all three institutions.

== Other endeavors and achievements ==
On November 20, 1954, in a laboratory above the new Reptile House, Oliver opened the first meeting of a new herpetological society, the Metropolitan New York Herpetological Society (now NYHS). The guiding principles of the NYHS were education and conservation, established under Oliver's guidance.

Oliver was deeply committed to elevate the standards of professional quality in zoological parks and museums and to this end, in 1961 he was selected to serve as a member of the New York State education commissioner's committee to study the aims, needs and contributions of museums as educational institutions. The report of this committee formed the basis of legislation for state aid to museums that was introduced in January 1963 in the New York state Legislature. He was also actively involved in the American Association of Museums, particularly in its environmental education programs.

Oliver was the founder of the Caribbean Conservation Corporation. This organization was devoted mainly to saving the endangered green sea turtle but was also interested in preserving the Caribbean environment.

In 1963, Oliver was awarded the Outstanding Achievement Award of the University of Michigan. The citation noted that "during his increasingly eminent career as scientist and curator, Dr. Oliver has directed natural history museums to the equal gratification of scientists, students and the general public."

In 1970, Oliver was appointed environmental consultant to the New York City Administration of Parks, Recreation and Cultural Affairs.

Oliver was a Fellow of the New York Zoological Society, was founder and first chairman of the Cultural Institutions Group of New York and was vice-chairman of the American Committee for International Wildlife Protection.

Amongst his many achievements as a herpetologist at the zoo, his greatest is said to have been the recording of the first detailed observations and photographs of king cobras breeding in captivity. His observations and photographs included the breeding, nest building, egg laying, parental care, hatching and care of the young.

== Publications ==
Among the many scientific papers and articles on reptiles, Oliver wrote two popular books;

- The Natural History of North American Amphibians and Reptiles (1955)
- Snakes in Fact and Fiction (1958)

=== Select Bibliography ===
- Caiman lizard – a reptile rarity Animal Kingdom LIV(5): 151-153 (1951)
- Prevention and Treatment of Snake Bite (1952)
- The most beautiful reptile house in the world Animal Kingdom LVII(4): 98-109 (1954)
- Lizards of the sea Animal Kingdom LIX(5): 148-151 (1956)
- The not-so-frightful copperhead Animal Kingdom LXI(2): 40-46 (1958)

== Personal life ==
Oliver married Elizabeth Kimball of Saginaw, Michigan, on May 3, 1941. They had two children, Patricia Allison and Dexter Kimball. They split their time between New York City and Sherman, Connecticut. Later in life, he married Ruth Norton, who survived him.

== Eponyms ==
Oliver is honored in the scientific names of three reptiles: Dendrelaphis oliveri, Micrurus oliveri, and Sphaerodactylus oliveri.
