= Amazon milk frog =

There is more than one animal called Amazon milk frog:

- Veined tree frog (Trachycephalus typhonius)
- Mission golden-eyed tree frog (Trachycephalus mesophaeus)
- Amazonian milk frog (Trachycephalus macrotis)
