= Trachycephalus mambaiensis =

Scientific classification
- Kingdom: Animalia
- Phylum: Chordata
- Class: Amphibia
- Order: Anura
- Family: Hylidae
- Genus: Trachycephalus
- Species: T. mambaiensis

Binomial name
- Trachycephalus mambaiensis Cintra, Silva, Silva, Garcia and Zaher, 2009

Species of frog

Trachycephalus mambaiensis, also known as the Mambai casque-headed tree frog, is a species of frog in the family Hylidae. It is endemic to Brazil.

== Taxonomy ==
The species was formally described in 2009 based on an adult male specimen collected from near the dam for the Santa Edwiges I hydroelectric power plant, near the municipality of Mambaí in Goiás. It is named after the municipality.

== Description ==
The back is dark brown, with light brown to creamy spots scattered erratically. The underside of the body is cream-colored with grey speckling, concentrated along the throat and flanks. The two longest blotches are located along the sides of the back, stretching from the scapular to sacral areas. The flanks have some large, round, cream-colored spots, contrasting with a brown-grayish base color, while the dorsal sides of the limbs have cream-colored bars against a dark brown base. The dorsal surface of the toes and fingers is yellowish. The frog has several small reddish spots on the back, a distinctive feature shared by only one other species in its genus, the black-spotted casque-headed tree frog. The vocal sacs are dark brown or black when uninflated. The iris is golden with a lattice of black.

== Distribution ==
The Mambai casque-headed tree frog is endemic to Brazil, where it is known from the states of Bahia, Goiás, Minas Gerais, and Tocantins.

== Biology ==
The Mambai casque-headed tree frog is known to be preyed on by the parrot-snake Leptophis mystacinus.
