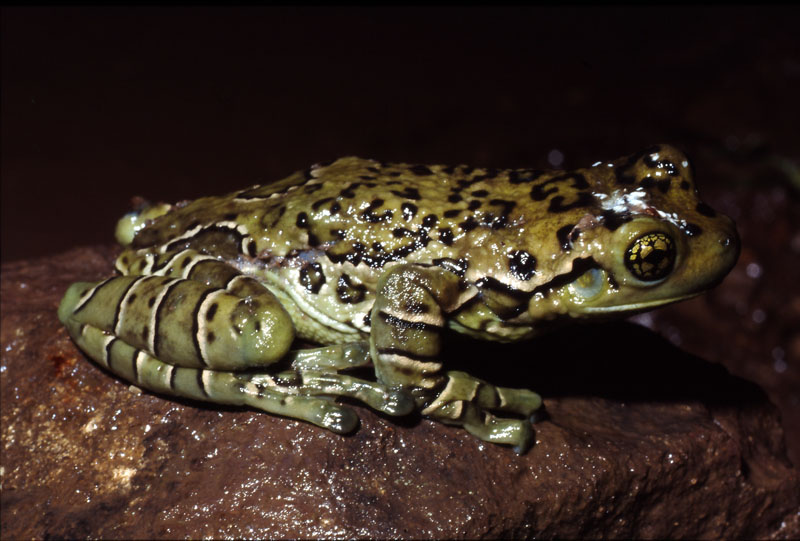

Conservation status
- Least Concern (IUCN 3.1)

Scientific classification
- Domain: Eukaryota
- Kingdom: Animalia
- Phylum: Chordata
- Class: Amphibia
- Order: Anura
- Family: Hylidae
- Genus: Trachycephalus
- Species: T. dibernardoi

Binomial name
- Trachycephalus dibernardoi Kwet and Solé, 2008

= Trachycephalus dibernardoi =

Species of amphibian

Trachycephalus dibernardoi is a frog in the family Hylidae. It is endemic to Brazil and Argentina. Scientists think it might also live in Paraguay.

== Taxonomy ==
Original description

This species was originally described in 2008 by the herpetologists Axel Kwet and Mirco Solé.

Type locality

The type locality for this species is: "Centro de Pesquisas e Conservação da Natureza (CPCN) Pró Mata, at the following coordinates: 29°30′S 50°10′W, at an altitude of 950 meters above sea level, in the municipality of São Francisco de Paula in the state of Rio Grande do Sul, Brazil."

Holotype

The designated holotype is catalogued as follows: MCP 2422; an adult female captured on 20 January 1996, by Axel Kwet and Marcos Di Bernardo. They found it stored in the collection of the PUCRS Museum of Science and Technology in Porto Alegre.

Etymology

The genus name Trachycephalus comes the Greek Trachy meaning "rough" and cephalus meaning "head." The species name dibernardoi is an eponym referring to the surname of the person to whom the frog is dedicated, the herpetologist Marcos Di Bernardo, in recognition of his valuable contributions to the knowledge of the herpetofauna of Rio Grande do Sul. Di Bernardo, was a professor of zoology at the Pontificia Universidad Católica of Río Grande do Sul. He captured the holotype with the other scientists named and co-wrote the book Pró-Mata: Anfíbios da Serra Gaúcha, Sul do Brasil (Amphibians of Serra Gaúcha, South of Brazil). In 2006, he died of skin cancer at the age of 42.

== Characteristics ==
This frog is very large for a hylid. Female specimens can measure 77.6 mm in snout-vent length and males 57.2 mm. The iris of the eye is yellow and has a characteristic pattern of black lines that form a pattern with radial symmetry with four clear marks resembling petals. The skin of its back can appear brown or olive in color with a pattern of eyemarks and other patches. There are black and white bands on its legs. Unlike T. imitatrix, it has a white parallelogram extending from each eye to the sacrum.

== Distribution and habitat ==
Within Brazil, it has been found in the states of Rio Grande do Sul (municipalities of São Francisco de Paula, at 950 m, and Machadinho, at 760 m) in the western part of the state of Santa Catarina (municipality of Seara, at 550 m).

It also lives in the very northeastern part of Argentina, in the province of Misiones, according to material from the El Soberbio (department of Guaraní, at 190 m), reported under the name Phrynohyas imitatrix.

Scientists suspect this frog has a wide distribution between altitudes of 150 and 1100 meters above sea level throughout the Sierra Geral and adjacent areas, with other possible populations in western Paraguay and in the state of Paraná in Brazil.

== Conservation ==
The International Union for the Conservation of Nature (IUCN), classifies this species as "least concern" in its Red List of Endangered Species.
