= Animal song =

Complex sounds made by animals

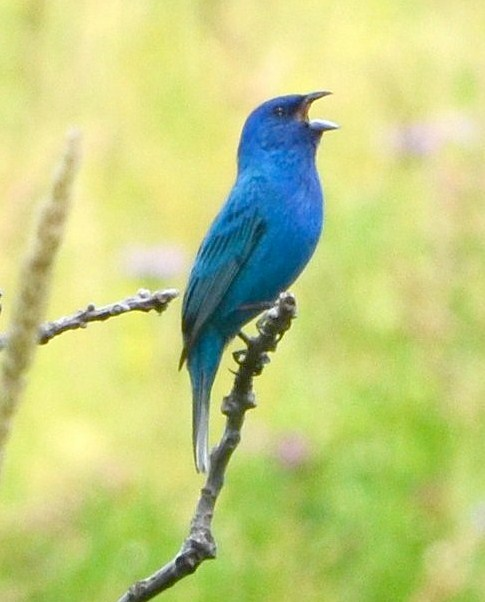
Indigo bunting (Passerina cyanea) vocalizing

Animal song is not a well-defined term in scientific literature, and the use of the more broadly defined term vocalizations is in more common use. Song generally consists of several successive vocal sounds incorporating multiple syllables. Some sources distinguish between simpler vocalizations, termed "calls", reserving the term "song" for more complex productions. Song-like productions have been identified in several groups of animals, including cetaceans (whales and dolphins), birds, frogs, bats, and humans. Social transmission of song has been found in groups including birds and cetaceans.

== Anatomy of sound production ==
=== Mammals ===
Toothed whale (odontocete) vocal anatomy

Most mammalian species produce sound by passing air from the lungs across the larynx, vibrating the vocal folds. Sound then enters the supralaryngeal vocal tract, which can be adjusted to produce various changes in sound output, providing refinement of vocalizations. Although morphological differences between species affect production of sound, neural control is thought to be more essential factor in producing the variations within human speech and song compared to those of other mammals. Cetacean vocalizations are an exception to this general mechanism. Toothed whales (odontocetes) pass air through a system of air sacs and muscular phonic lips, which vibrate to produce audible vocalizations, thus serving the function of vocal folds in other mammals. Sound vibrations are conveyed to an organ in the head called the melon, which can be changed in shape to control and direct vocalizations. Unlike in humans and other mammals, toothed whales are able to recycle air used in vocal production, allowing whales to sing without releasing air. Some cetaceans, such as humpback whales, sing continuously for hours.

=== Frogs ===
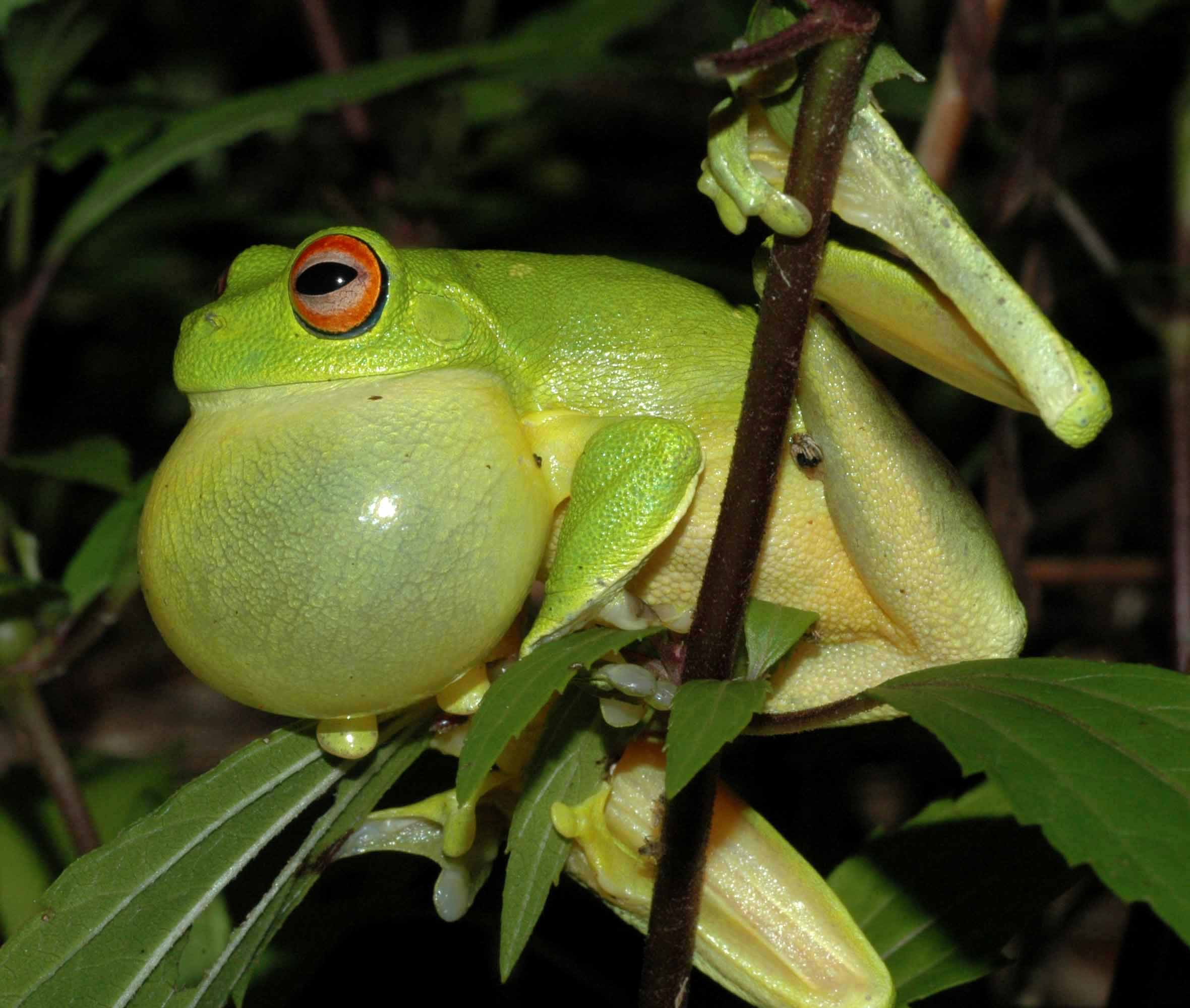
Red-eyed tree frog (Litoria chloris) with inflated vocal sac while vocalizing

Like mammals, frogs possess a larynx and vocal folds, which are used to create vibrations in sound production. However, frogs also use structures called vocal sacs, elastic membranes in the base of the mouth which inflate during sound production. These sacs provide both amplification and fine-tuning of sounds, and also allow air to be pushed back into the lungs during vocalizations. This allows air used in sound production to be recycled, and is thought to have evolved to increase song efficiency. Increased efficiency of sound production is important, as some frogs may produce calls lasting for several hours during mating seasons. The New River tree frog (Trachycephalus hadroceps), for example, spends hours producing up to 38,000 calls in a single night, which is made possible through the efficient recycling of air by the vocal sac.

=== Birds ===
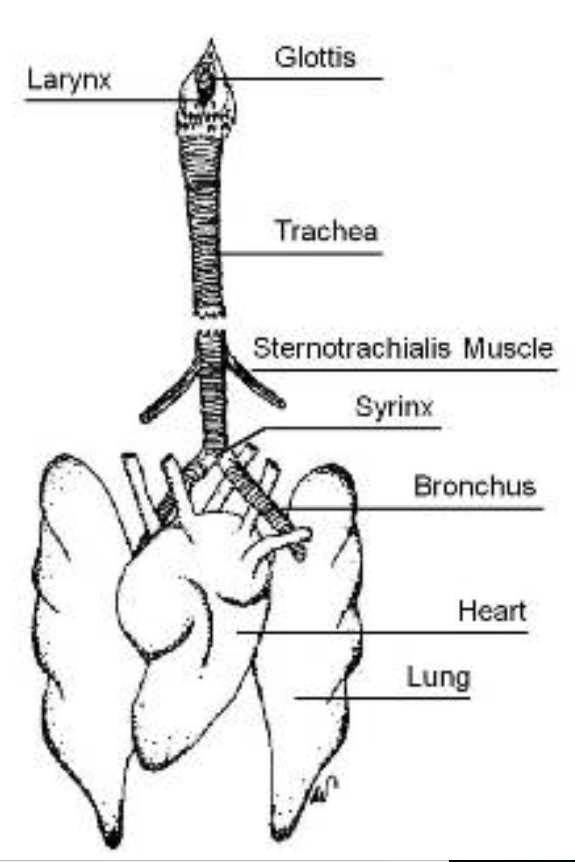
Avian respiratory and vocal anatomy

When birds inhale, air is passed from the mouth, through the trachea, which forks into two bronchi connecting to the lungs. The primary vocal organ of birds is called the syrinx, which is located at the fork of the trachea, and is not present in mammals. As air passes through the respiratory tract, the syrinx and the membranes within vibrate to produce sound. Birds are capable of producing continuous song during both inhalation and exhalation, and may sing continuously for several minutes. For example, the skylark (Alauda arvensis) is capable of producing non-stop song for up to one hour. Some birds change their song characteristics during inhalation versus exhalation. The Brewer's sparrow (Spizella breweri) alternates between rapid trilling during exhalation interspersed with lower-rate trills during short inhalations. The two halves of the syrinx connect to separate lungs, and can be controlled independently, allowing some birds to produce two separate notes simultaneously.

=== Insects ===
Insects such as crickets (family Gryllidae) are well known for their ability to produce loud song, however the mechanism of sound production differs greatly from most other animals. Many insects generate sound by mechanical rubbing of body structures, a mechanism known as stridulation. Orthopteran insects, including crickets and katydids (family Tettigoniidae), have been especially well-studied for sound production. These insects use scraper-like structures on one wing to sweep over file-structures on an opposing wing to create vibrations, producing a variety of trilling and chirping sounds. Locusts and other grasshoppers (suborder Caelifera) stridulate by rubbing hind legs against pegs on wing surfaces in an up and downward motion. Cicadas (superfamily Cicadoidea) produce sound at much greater volumes than orthopterans, relying on a pair of organs called tymbals on the base of the abdomen behind the wings. Muscle contraction rapidly deforms the tymbal membrane, emitting several different types of sounds. Insects thus produce a variety of sounds, using various mechanisms distinct from other animals.

== Functions of vocalizations ==
Vocalizations can play a wide variety of different roles. In groups such as anurans and birds, several distinct types of notes are incorporated to form songs, which are sung in different situations and serve distinct functions. For example, many frogs may use trilling notes in mate attraction, but switch to different vocal patterns in aggressive territorial displays. In some species, a single song incorporates several note types which serve different purposes, with one type of note eliciting responses from females, and another note of the same song responsible for warning competitor males of aggression.

Common nightingale sings both day and night. It is believed the day song is territorial in nature while the nocturnal song is intended to attract a mate.

=== Mating and courtship ===
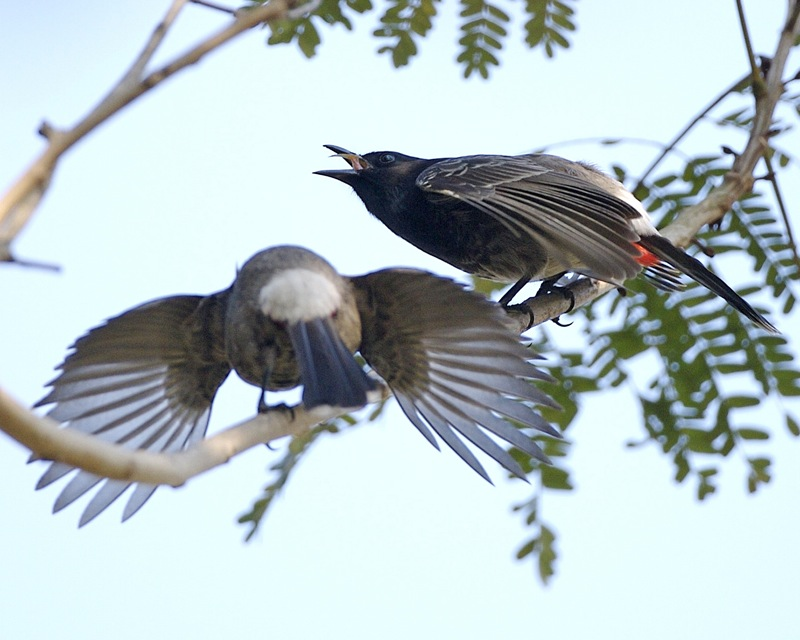
Mating display (including song production) by red-vented bulbul (Pycnonotus cafer)

Vocalizations play an important role in the mating behaviour of many animals. In many groups (birds, frogs, crickets, whales, etc.), song production is more common in males of the species, and is often used to attract females.

Bird song is thought to have evolved through sexual selection. Female songbirds often assess potential mates using song, based on qualities such as high song output, complexity and difficulty of songs, as well as presence of local dialect. Song output serves as a fitness indicator of males, since vocalizations require both energy and time to produce, and thus males capable of producing high song output for long durations may have higher fitness than less vocal males. It is thought that song complexity may serve as an indicator of male fitness by providing an indication of successful brain development despite potential early-life stressors, such as lack of food. Social transmission of songs allows for development of local dialects of song, and female songbirds also typically prefer to choose mates producing local song dialects. One hypothesis for this phenomenon is that selecting local mates allows the female to choose genes specially adapted to suit local conditions.

Frog song also plays a prominent role in courtship. In túngara frogs (Engystomops pustulosus), male frogs increase the complexity of their calls, adding additional note types when greater numbers of competitor males are present, which has been found to attract greater numbers of female frogs. Some species change their courtship calls when females are especially nearby. In male glass frogs (Hyalinobatachium fleichmanni), a long frequency-modulated vocalization is produced upon noticing another nearby frog, but is changed to a short chirping song when a female approaches. Several species (e.g., dendrobatid frogs (Mannophryne trinitatis), ornate frogs (Cophixalus ornatus), splendid poison frogs (Dendrobates speciosus)), switch from long-range loud trilling sounds to short-range quieter chirps when females move closer, which is thought to allow mate attraction without alerting competitor males to female locations.

Although highly complex song-like production has been identified in whales, the function is still somewhat elusive. It is thought to be involved in courtship behaviour and sexual selection, and singing behaviour becomes more common during the breeding season.

=== Aggression and territorial defense ===
Another major function of song output is to indicate aggression among males during breeding seasons. Both anurans and birds use singing in territorial displays to confer aggressive intent. For eastern smooth frogs (Geocrinia victoriana), for example, courtship songs involve shorter notes to attract potential mates, and are followed by longer tones to repel males. Frequency of sounds produced generally negatively correlates with body size both within and among species, and allows competing males to assess body size of vocalizing neighbouring frogs. Male frogs typically approach higher frequency sounds more readily than lower frequencies, likely because the frog producing the sound is assessed to be a smaller, less dangerous competitor.

In territorial birds, males increase song production rate when neighbouring males encroach on their territory. In great tits (Parus major), nightingales (Luscinia megarhynchos), blackbirds (Turdus merula) and sparrows (family Passeridae), playing song recordings slows the rate at which males establish territories in an unoccupied region, suggesting these birds rely on song output in establishing territorial boundaries. Experimentally muted Scott's seaside sparrow (Ammodramus maritimus) lose control of their territories to other males. Thus, territorial birds often rely on song production to repel conspecific males.

=== Individual recognition ===
Like the human voice, bird song typically contains sufficient individual variability to allow discrimination of individual vocal patterns by conspecifics. Such discrimination is important to mate recognition of many monogamous species. Seabirds, for example, often use vocalization patterns to recognize their mate upon reunion during the breeding season. In many colonial nesting birds, parent-offspring recognition is critical to allow parents to locate their own offspring upon return to nesting sites. Cliff swallows (Petrochelidon pyrrhonota) have been demonstrated to preferentially respond to parental songs at a young age, providing a means of vocalization-based offspring recognition.

Lone herring gull call caught in a storm.

== Social transmission and learning ==
Stages of song development in birds

=== Learning and development of birdsong ===
Learned vocalizations have been identified in groups including whales, elephants, seals, and primates, however the most well-established examples of learned singing is in birds. In many species, young birds learn songs from adult males of the same species, typically fathers. This was first demonstrated in chaffinches (Fringilla coelabs). Chaffinches raised in social isolation develop abnormal songs, however playing recordings of chaffinch songs allows the young birds to learn their species-specific songs. Song learning generally involves a sensitive learning period in early life, during which young birds must be exposed to song from tutor animals in order to develop normal singing as adults. Song learning occurs in two stages: the sensory phase and the sensorimotor phase. During the sensory phase, birds memorize the song of a tutor animal, forming a template representation of the species-specific song. The sensorimotor phase follows and may overlap with the sensory phase. During the sensorimotor phase, young birds initially produce variable, rambling versions of adult song, called subsong. As learning progresses, the subsong is replaced with a more refined version containing elements of adult song, called plastic song. Finally, the song learning crystallizes into adult song. For song learning to occur properly, young birds must be able to hear and refine their vocal productions, and birds deafened before the development of subsong do not learn to produce normal adult song.

The sensitive period in which birds must be exposed to song tutoring varies across species, but typically occurs within the first year of life. Birds in which song learning is limited to the initial sensitive period are referred to as closed-ended learners, whereas some birds (e.g., canaries; Serinus canaria), continue to learn new songs later in life, and are called open-ended learners. Some species of birds, such as the brown-headed cowbird (Molothrus ater), parasitize other bird species, laying their eggs in the nests of other birds such that the heterospecific bird raises the chicks. Although most birds acquire song learning within the first year, brown-headed cowbirds have a delayed sensitive period, occurring approximately one year after hatching. This may be an adaptation to prevent the young birds from learning the songs from the foreign bird species. Instead, the young birds have a year in which to find conspecifics, and learn their own species-specific song.

Birds are generally predisposed to favour learning of conspecific songs, and will typically preferentially learn the song form conspecific animals rather than heterospecifics. However, song learning is not completely restricted to within-species songs. If exposed to heterospecific birds of another species in absence of same-species birds, young birds will often adopt the song of the species to which it was exposed. Although birds are capable of learning song production purely from audio recordings of birdsong, tutor-student interaction may be important in some species. For example, white-crowned sparrows (Zonotrichia leucophrys) preferentially learn the songs of song sparrows (Melospiza melodia) when exposed to recordings of white-crowned sparrows and live song sparrows. In other words, the interactive nature of a live tutor seems to trump the familiarity of the recordings from conspecifics.

=== Cultural transmission of whale song ===
While vertical transmission (parent-offspring) is a common element of song learning, horizontal transmission among animals of the same generation can also occur. Male humpback whales produce various songs over their lifetime, which are learned from other males in the population. Males in a population conform to produce the same mating song, consisting of a highly stereotyped vocal display involved in mate attraction. The cultural transmission of these songs has been found to occur across great geographic distances over years, with one study noting song transmission across the western and central South Pacific Ocean populations over an 11-year period.

The song of the 52-hertz whale, which, because of the unusual frequency of the sound and the lack of other whales sounding at the frequency, is considered the "world's loneliest whale."

== See also ==
- Animal communication
- Animal language
- Bird song
- Vocal learning
- Whale song
