= Jenkinson's Boardwalk =

Amusement boardwalk in New Jersey, US

- Previously known as Jenkinson's South
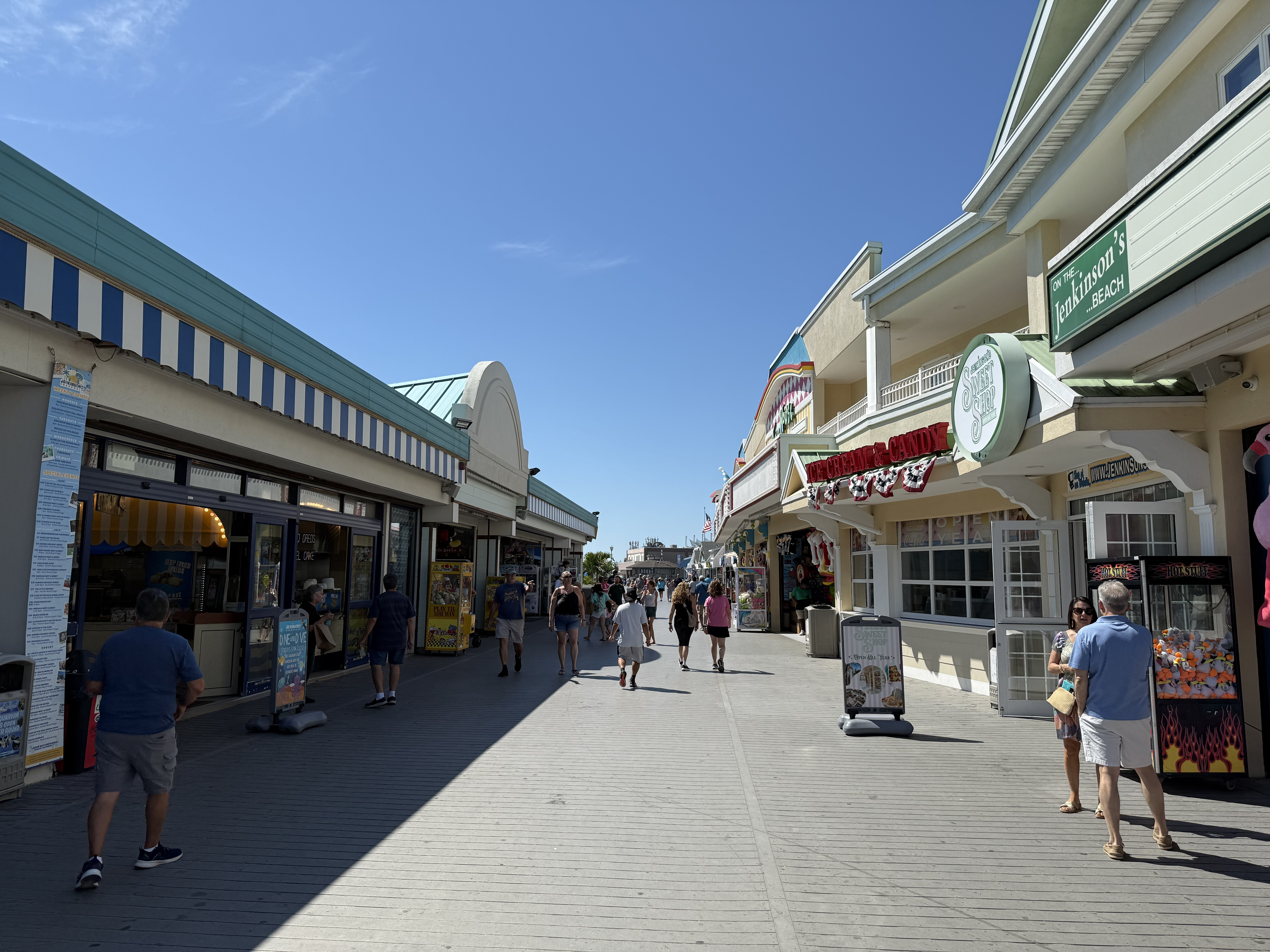
- Jenkinson's Boardwalk facing south
- Interactive map of Jenkinson's Boardwalk
- Location: Point Pleasant Beach, New Jersey, U.S.
- Coordinates: 40.0937°N 74.0366°W
- Opened: 1928
- Owner: Storino family

Attractions
- Total: 28
- Roller coasters: 2
- Website: www.jenkinsons.com

Jenkinson's Boardwalk (colloquially Jenk's) is a boardwalk in Point Pleasant Beach, New Jersey. It has been owned by the Storino family since 1976. Jenkinson's has a ropes course, four amusement arcades, boardwalk games, an amusement park, a beach, two mini golf courses, and an aquarium.

== History ==
In 1926, Charles Jenkinson acquired the land that Jenkinson's sits on. In 1928, Jenkinson's Pavilion opened, featuring a candy shop, soda fountain, novelty store, and a swimming pool. In 1929, Jenkinson's expanded, adding a dance hall and mini golf course. The beach was acquired in 1934 and Charles built a bathhouse.

In 1937, Charles died and his son Orlo took over the business.

In 1949, a miniature train ride was added. It ran along the beach to connect the operations at the inlet to the Pavilion.

In 1954, Jenkinson's opened a small kiddie park.

In 1964, Orlo died and his son took over the business. Without the hands-on leadership that Orlo provided, the growth of Jenkinson's stagnated.

By the late 1970s, Jenkinson's was struggling and it was acquired by Pasquale "Pat" Storino. Upon purchasing Jenkinson's, Storino renovated the Pavilion, adding an arcade, concession stands, games, and a restaurant.

In 1978, a dinner theater was added to the Pavilion.

In 1980, a waterslide complex replaced the swimming pool and mini golf course. Storino also acquired Fun Fair, a small kiddie park located across the boardwalk from the Pavilion.

In 1983, the Storino family purchased Holiday Playland, a small amusement park located towards the southern end of the boardwalk. It was renamed to Jenkinson's South. After the 1983 season, many of the thrill rides were replaced with family rides.

At the end of the 1987 season, Fun Fair was replaced by a new mini golf course. The Storinos also purchased Herman's Amusements, an amusement park located next to Jenkinson's South.

On November 22, 1989, the Pavilion burned down from a fire that occurred in the kitchen during a renovation. After burning down, the Pavilion was rebuilt with a food court, full-service restaurant, live entertainment, a bar, and an arcade.

In 1991, Jenkinson's Aquarium opened. Additionally, the water slides were removed, due to the popularity of the beach and competition from nearby water parks.

In 1998, the park added a fun house, a type of attraction that had largely disappeared by the late 1990s. The Fun House continues to be updated every season, with new theming and obstacles. The Fun House anchored a multi-year renovation of the boardwalk which included many new additions.

In August 2025, the park announced the addition of Patriot's Run, a new, America 250 themed roller coaster for the 2026 season. In late May 2026, Patriot's Run began testing, the ride opened on May 30, 2026. On July 16, 2026, Jenkinson's held a ribbon cutting ceremony celebrating the addition of the coaster.

== Attractions ==
=== Roller coasters ===
==== Current roller coasters ====
Name	Image	Manufacturer	Model	Year opened	Ref(s)
Shark Escape		SBF Visa Group	Double Coaster (MX605)	2022	
Patriot's Run		SBF Visa Group	Cyclone Coaster (MX49)	2026	

==== Defunct roller coasters ====
Name	Image	Manufacturer	Model	Year opened	Year closed	Ref(s)
Flitzer		Zierer	Filtzer	1992	2018	
Tidal Wave		SBF Visa Group	Spinning Coaster (MX612 v5.0)	2019	2025	
Toboggan		Chance Rides	Toboggan	Unknown	Unknown	
Tornado		Zamperla	Single Helix	1979–1995	2021	

=== Aquarium ===
Jenkinson's Aquarium opened in 1991 and hosts a variety of aquatic and terrestrial life, including fiddler rays, a Kemp's ridley sea turtle, a sand tiger shark, nurse sharks, blacktip reef sharks, spotted wobbegongs, clownfish, frogfish, an American bullfrog, crayfish, axolotls, a ball python, a zebra shark, bamboo sharks, harbor seals, horseshoe crabs, whelks, spider crabs, a lobster, shrimpfish, a pygmy marmoset, a blue-and-gold macaw, a Moluccan cockatoo, redspotted hawkfish, yellowhead jawfish, neon gobies, pinecone fish, a Linnaeus's two-toed sloth, milky tree frogs, northern diamondback terrapins, tiger salamanders, eastern screech owls, African penguins, a Standing's day gecko, square-marked toads, African green toads, and pancake tortoises. The Aquarium was accredited by the Association of Zoos and Aquariums in 2008.

In 1991, the Aquarium took in a one-eyed harbor seal named Luseal. Luseal lived at the Aquarium until she died in 2023.

=== Other attractions ===
Jenkinson's has a ropes course, 4 arcades, boardwalk games, a beach, and 2 mini golf courses.
