= Trachycephalus quadrangulum =

Scientific classification
- Kingdom: Animalia
- Phylum: Chordata
- Class: Amphibia
- Order: Anura
- Family: Hylidae
- Genus: Trachycephalus
- Species: T. quadrangulum

Binomial name
- Trachycephalus quadrangulum (Boulenger, 1882)

Synonyms
- Hyla quadrangulum Boulenger, 1882

Species of frog

Trachycephalus quadrangulum, the Chocoan milk frog, is a species of frog in the family Hylidae. It is endemic to the Pacific slopes of the Andes in Ecuador and Peru. Scientists have seen it between 20 and 350 meters above sea level.

The adult male frog measures 53.4 to 76.9 mm in snout-vent length and the adult female frog 60.5 to 80.8 mm. The adult frog is brown or gray in color with a four-sided darker gray mark on its back. Its head is wider than it is long.
