= Trachycephalus cunauaru =

Scientific classification
- Kingdom: Animalia
- Phylum: Chordata
- Class: Amphibia
- Order: Anura
- Family: Hylidae
- Genus: Trachycephalus
- Species: T. cunauaru

Binomial name
- Trachycephalus cunauaru (Gordo, Toledo, Suárez, Kawashita-Ribeiro, Ávila, Morais, and Nunes, 2013)

Synonyms
- Trachycephalus cunauaru (Pombal, Haddad, and Cruz, 2003)

Species of frog

Trachycephalus cunauaru is a frog in the family Hylidae. It is endemic to Brazil, Bolivia, and Ecuador, where it lives in rainforest and other forest habitats. Scientists believe it may also live in Colombia and Peru. Scientists have seen it as high as 800 meters above sea level.

The adult male frog measures 57.9 to 74.3 mm long in snout-vent length and the adult female frog 74.4 to 84.9 mm. This frog has a pattern of dark and light brown or gray on its back. Its toes are light green in color.

This frog is nocturnal. It frog spends almost all of its life cycle in canopy. It reproduces during the rainy season. The male frog finds a water-filled hole or cavity inside a tree. Then it perches between 2 and 32 meters off the ground and sings to attract a female, who lays her eggs in the water. Scientists believe the frogs are territorial and may compete for good nesting sites. The female frog can lay 1000 eggs per clutch.

The name cunauaru comes from the language of the indigenous people of the Amazon area. The name is onomatopoeia for the frog's call and also sounds like "toad wife." It also refers to the way the male frog calls for the female frog on nights when the moon is bright.
