= Trachycephalus macrotis =

Conservation status
- Least Concern (IUCN 3.1)

Scientific classification
- Kingdom: Animalia
- Phylum: Chordata
- Class: Amphibia
- Order: Anura
- Family: Hylidae
- Genus: Trachycephalus
- Species: T. macrotis

Binomial name
- Trachycephalus macrotis (Andersson, 1945)

Synonyms
- Hyla macrotis Andersson, 1945; Trachycephalus macrotis Ron, Venegas, Ortega-Andrade, Gagliardi-Urrutia, and Salerno, 2016

Species of frog

Trachycephalus macrotis, also known as the Amazonian milk frog and known in Spanish as rana lechera de Pastaza, is a frog in the family Hylidae. It is endemic to Peru and Ecuador. It has been observed between 225 and 925 m above sea level.

== Description ==
The adult male frog measures 69.8 to 91.5 mm in snout-vent length and the adult female frog 93.9 to 118.7 mm. Its head is wider than it is long. It has bronze-colored skin with coffee-colored marks. It has some webbing on its feet and relatively small climbing disks on its toes.

== Taxonomy ==
This species was split from the taxon T. typhonius.

== Habitat ==
This nocturnal frog lives in submontane tropical forests, especially primary forest, near streams. However, it has also been spotted near plantations, roads, and human habitation. This frog has been observed between 225 and 925 metres (738 and 3,035 ft) above sea level.

== Life cycle ==
This frog engages in explosive breeding after heavy rain. The male frog floats in a temporary body of water and calls to the female. The eggs float on the water, in which the tadpoles later swim and develop.

== Threats ==
The IUCN classifies this frog as least concern of extinction because of its large range, presumed large population, and tolerance to disturbed habitats. What threat it faces comes from habitat loss associated with agriculture and logging. There is some record of people capturing T. typhonius in the wild for the international pet trade, but scientists do not believe this poses a substantial threat to T. macrotis at this time.

The frog's range includes some protected parks: Parque Nacional Yasuní, Reserva de Producción de Fauna Cuyabeno, Reserva Ecológica Manglares Churute, Reserva Biológica Jatun Sacha, and Estación de Biodiversidad Tiputini.
