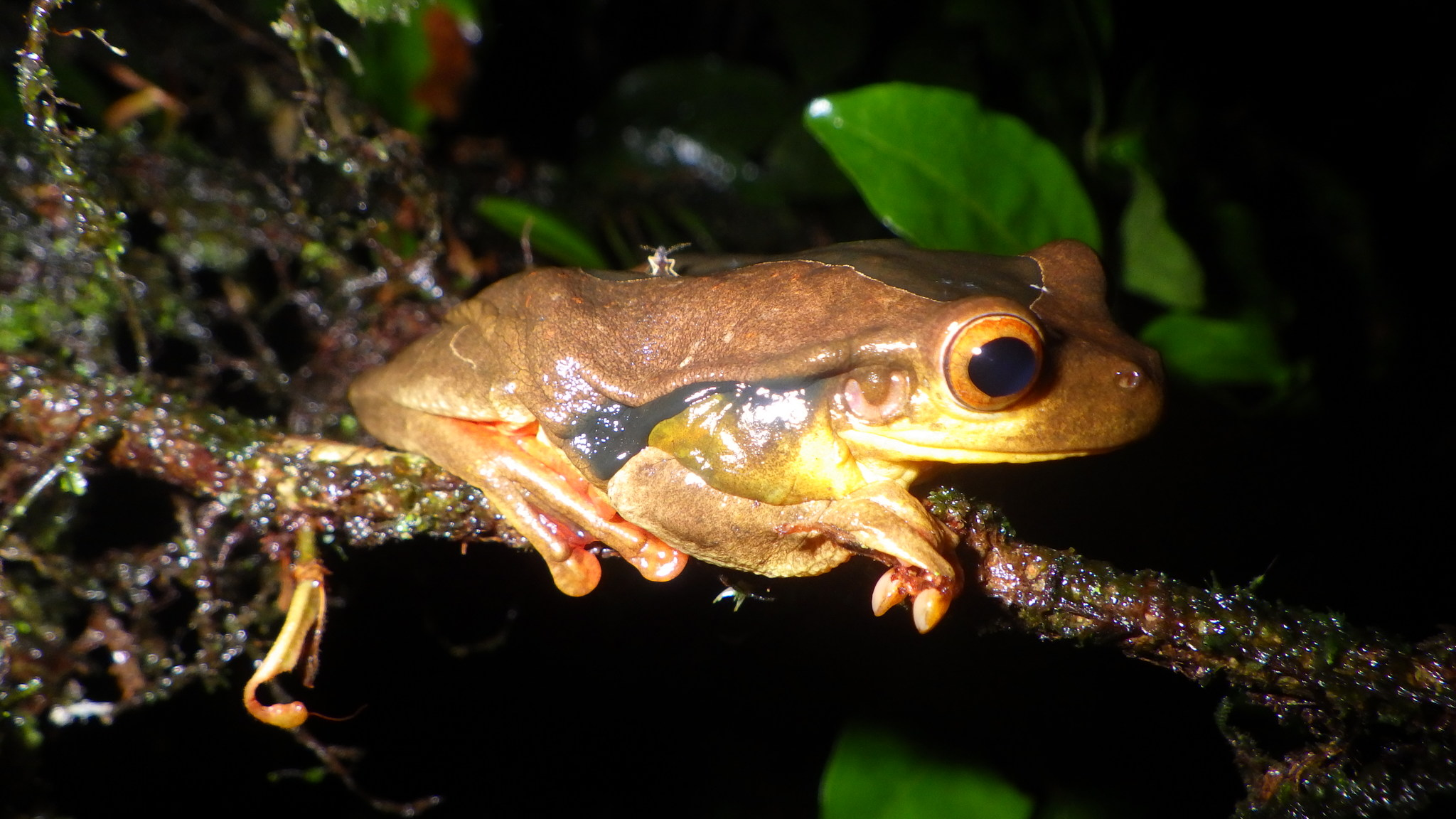

Conservation status
- Least Concern (IUCN 3.1)

Scientific classification
- Kingdom: Animalia
- Phylum: Chordata
- Class: Amphibia
- Order: Anura
- Family: Hylidae
- Genus: Trachycephalus
- Species: T. coriaceus

Binomial name
- Trachycephalus coriaceus (Peters, 1867)

Synonyms
- Hyla quadrangulum Boulenger, 1882

= Surinam golden-eyed tree frog =

Species of amphibian

The Surinam golden-eyed tree frog (Trachycephalus coriaceus) is a species of frog in the family Hylidae found in Bolivia, Brazil, Ecuador, French Guiana, Peru, Suriname, and possibly Colombia. Its natural habitat is subtropical or tropical moist lowland forests. It is threatened by habitat loss.
