= Trachycephalus helioi =

Scientific classification
- Kingdom: Animalia
- Phylum: Chordata
- Class: Amphibia
- Order: Anura
- Family: Hylidae
- Genus: Trachycephalus
- Species: T. helioi

Binomial name
- Trachycephalus helioi Nunes, Suárez, Gordo, and Pombal, 2013

Species of frog

Trachycephalus helioi is a species of frog in the family Hylidae. It has been observed only in Brazil at a single location.
