= Milky tree frog =

Scientific classification
- Kingdom: Animalia
- Phylum: Chordata
- Class: Amphibia
- Order: Anura
- Family: Hylidae
- Genus: Trachycephalus
- Species: T. vermiculatus

Binomial name
- Trachycephalus vermiculatus (Cope, 1887)

Synonyms
- Hyla vermiculatus (Duméril and Bibron, 1841); Hyla spilomma (Cope, 1877); Hyla paenulata (Brocchi, 1879); Hyla nigropunctata (Boulenger, 1882); Acrodytes inflata (Taylor, 1944); Acrodytes spilomma (Taylor, 1944); Acrodytes modesta (Taylor and Smith, 1945); Phrynohyas latifasciata (Duellman, 1956); Phrynohyas modesta (Duellman, 1956); Phrynohyas spilomma (Duellman, 1956); Phrynohyas corasterias (Shannon and Humphrey, 1957); Trachycephalus "vermiculatus" (Amphibian Species of the World, 2015)

Species of frog

The milky tree frog is a frog population endemic to Mexico, Central America, Ecuador, and Venezuela. It might be one species of frog or it might be many. The Amphibian Species of the World uses the scientific name Trachycephalus "vermiculatus," with quotes, for all frogs that scientists once considered part of Trachycephalus typhonius but later decided were not, a placeholder taxon. Other English names for these frogs include veined tree frog, common tree frog, warty tree frog, marbled tree frog, vein-eyed glue frog, Amazon tree frog, and pepper tree frog.

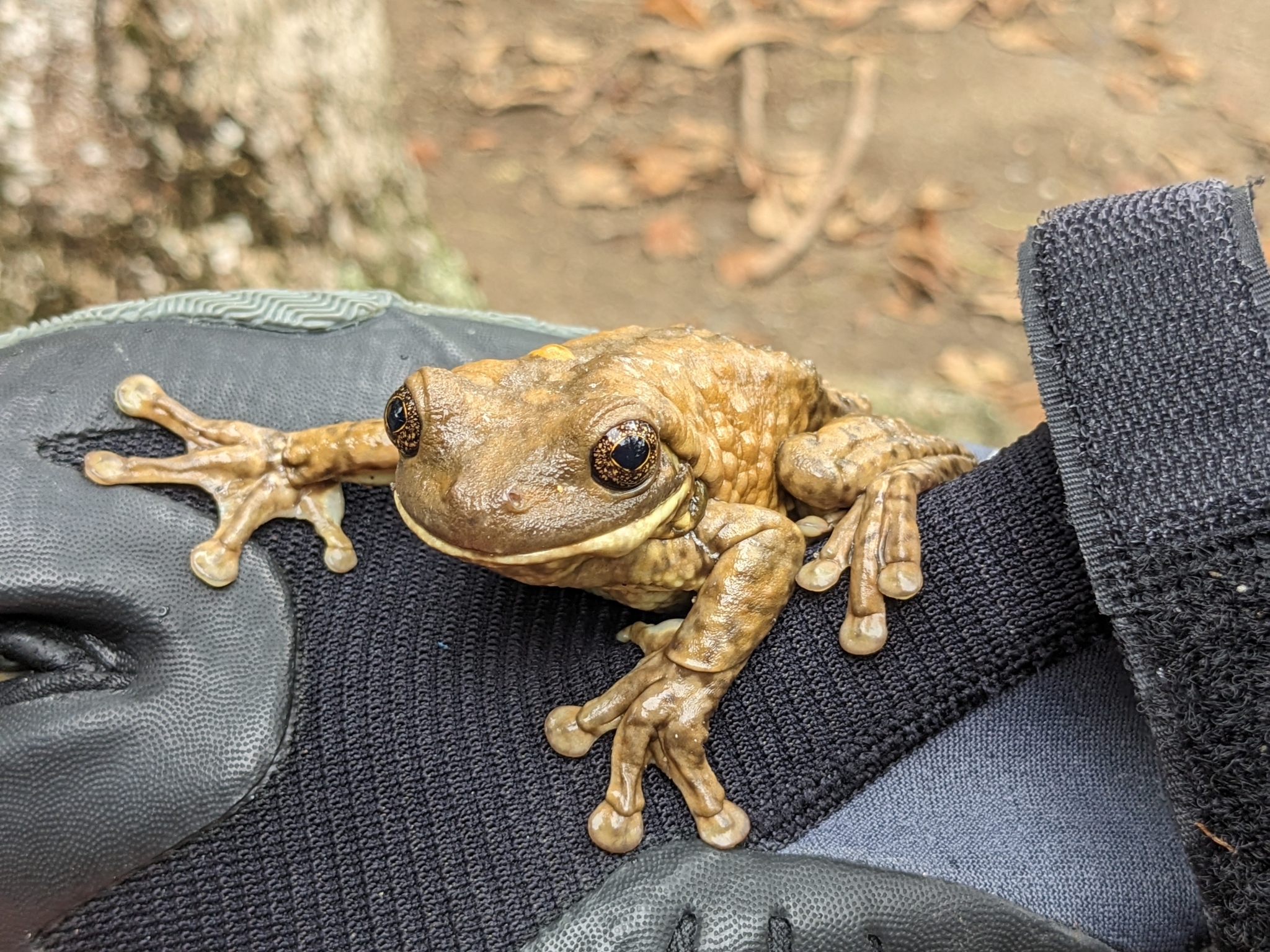
Trachycephalus vermiculatus
