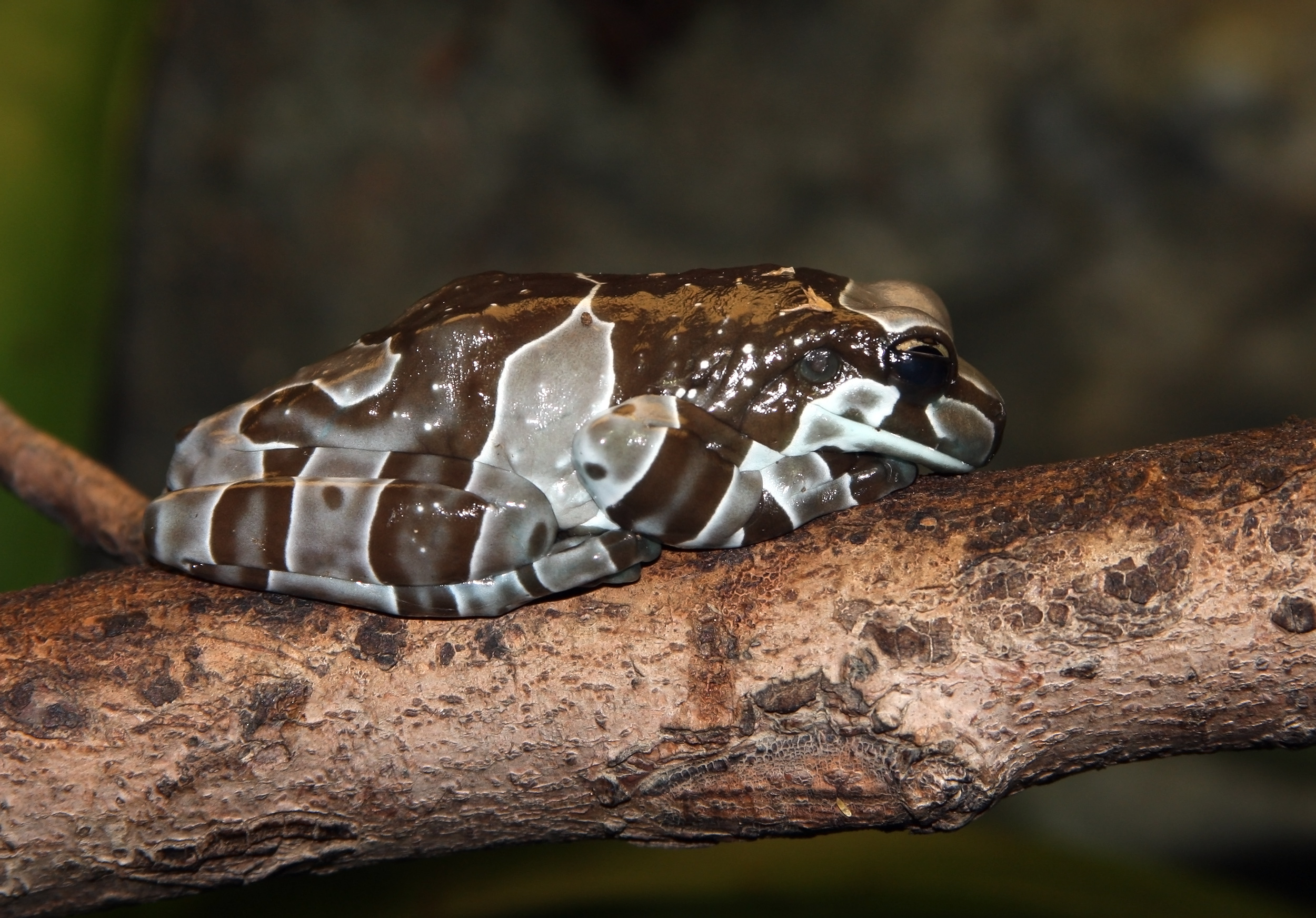
- Trachycephalus resinifictrix

Scientific classification
- Domain: Eukaryota
- Kingdom: Animalia
- Phylum: Chordata
- Class: Amphibia
- Order: Anura
- Family: Hylidae
- Subfamily: Lophyohylinae
- Genus: Trachycephalus; Tschudi, 1838

Species
- See text.

Synonyms
- Phrynohyas Fitzinger, 1843

= Trachycephalus =

Casque-headed tree frogs

Genus of amphibians

Trachycephalus is a genus of frogs, commonly known as the casque-headed tree frogs, in the family Hylidae. They are found in Mexico, Central America, and South America. In a recent revision, the seven species of the genus Phrynohyas were included in this genus, and Phrynohyas is now considered a synonym of Trachycephalus. These frogs inhabit the canopies of tropical rainforests, where they breed in tree cavities, and rarely, if ever, descend to the ground.

== Species ==
Binomial name and author	Common name
T. atlas Bokermann, 1966	Bokermann's casque-headed tree frog
T. coriaceus (Peters, 1867)	Surinam golden-eyed tree frog
T. cunauaru Gordo, Toledo, Suárez, Kawashita-Ribeiro, Ávila, Morais, and Nunes, 2013
T. dibernardoi Kwet and Solé, 2008
T. hadroceps (Duellman and Hoogmoed, 1992)	New River tree frog
T. helioi Nunes, Suárez, Gordo, and Pombal, 2013
T. imitatrix (Miranda-Ribeiro, 1926)	Rio golden-eyed tree frog
T. jordani (Stejneger and Test, 1891)	Jordan's casque-headed tree frog
T. lepidus (Pombal, Haddad, and Cruz, 2003)
T. macrotis (Andersson, 1945)	Amazonian milk frog
T. mambaiensis Cintra, Silva, Silva, Garcia and Zaher, 2009	Mambai casque-headed tree frog
T. mesophaeus (Hensel, 1867)	Porto Alegre golden-eyed tree frog
T. nigromaculatus Tschudi, 1838	black-spotted casque-headed tree frog
T. quadrangulum (Boulenger, 1882)	Chocoan milk frog
T. resinifictrix (Goeldi, 1907)	Mission golden-eyed tree frog or Amazon milk frog
T. typhonius (Linnaeus, 1758)	veined tree frog, common milk frog
T. venezolanus (Mertens, 1950)	Venezuela casque-headed frog
T. "vermiculatus" (Cope, 1877)	milky treefrog
