= Bokermann's casque-headed tree frog =

Conservation status
- Least Concern (IUCN 3.1)

Scientific classification
- Kingdom: Animalia
- Phylum: Chordata
- Class: Amphibia
- Order: Anura
- Family: Hylidae
- Genus: Trachycephalus
- Species: T. atlas

Binomial name
- Trachycephalus atlas Bokermann, 1966

Species of amphibian

Bokermann's casque-headed tree frog (Trachycephalus atlas) is a species of frog in the family Hylidae endemic to Brazil. Its natural habitats are subtropical or tropical dry forests, moist savanna, subtropical or tropical dry shrubland, and intermittent freshwater marshes. It is threatened by habitat loss.
