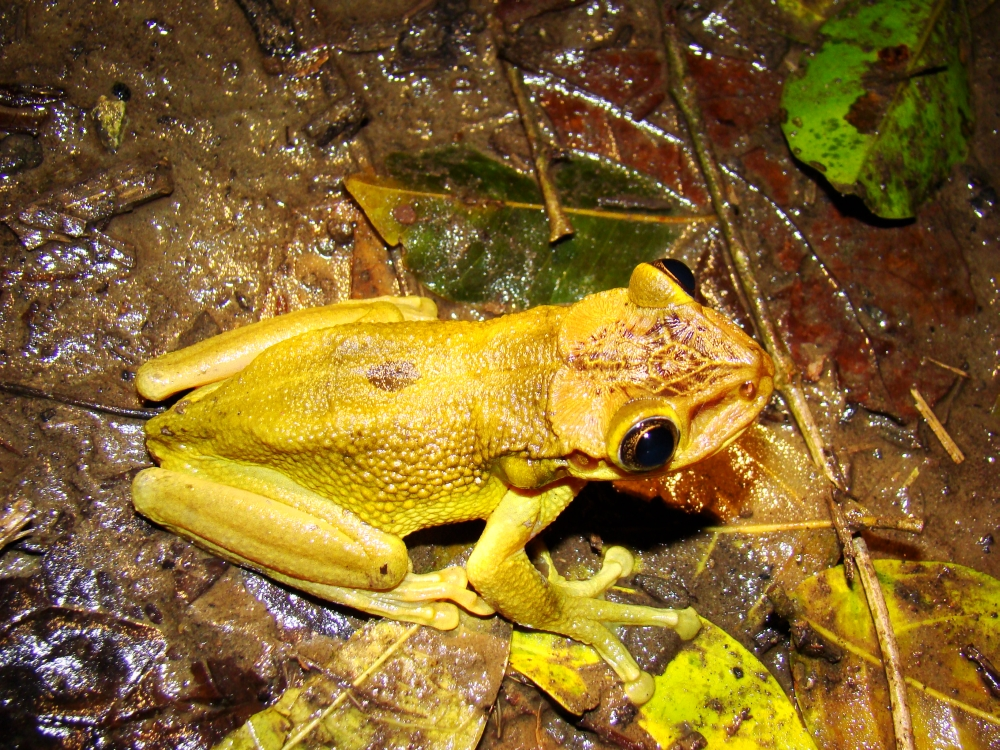

Conservation status
- Least Concern (IUCN 3.1)

Scientific classification
- Kingdom: Animalia
- Phylum: Chordata
- Class: Amphibia
- Order: Anura
- Family: Hylidae
- Genus: Trachycephalus
- Species: T. jordani

Binomial name
- Trachycephalus jordani (Stejneger & Test, 1891)

= Jordan's casque-headed tree frog =

Species of amphibian

Jordan's casque-headed tree frog (Trachycephalus jordani) is a species of frog in the family Hylidae found in Colombia, Ecuador, and Peru. Its natural habitats are subtropical or tropical dry forests, subtropical or tropical moist lowland forests, intermittent freshwater marshes, plantations, rural gardens, urban areas, and heavily degraded former forests. It is threatened by habitat loss.
