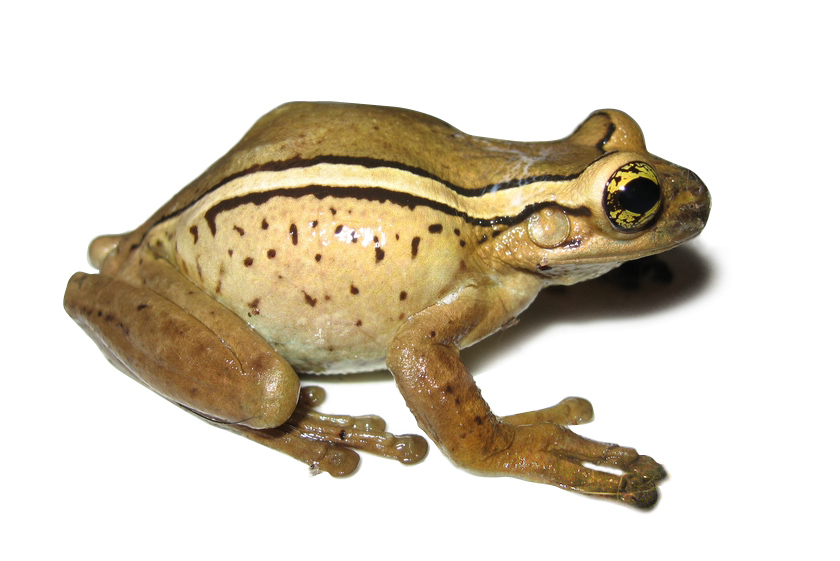

Conservation status
- Least Concern (IUCN 3.1)

Scientific classification
- Kingdom: Animalia
- Phylum: Chordata
- Class: Amphibia
- Order: Anura
- Family: Hylidae
- Genus: Trachycephalus
- Species: T. mesophaeus

Binomial name
- Trachycephalus mesophaeus (Hensel, 1867)

Synonyms
- Hyla mesophaea Hensel, 1867; Phrynohyas mesophaea (Hensel, 1867)

= Trachycephalus mesophaeus =

Porto Alegre golden-eyed tree frog

Species of amphibian

Trachycephalus mesophaeus is a species of frog in the family Hylidae. It is endemic to eastern Brazil and occurs in the Atlantic Forest between Pernambuco and Rio Grande do Sul, extending inland to central Minas Gerais. It is found at elevations below 800 m (2,600 ft). Common name Porto Alegre golden-eyed treefrog has been coined for it, Porto Alegre being its type locality.

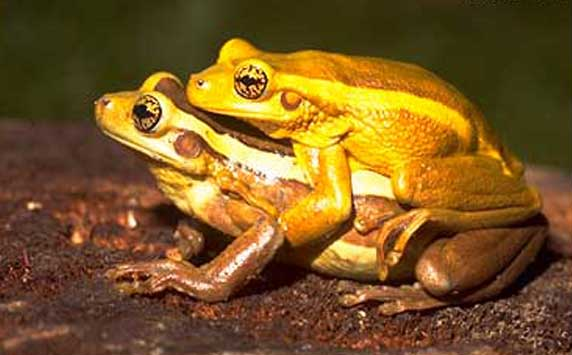
In amplexus

Trachycephalus mesophaeus occurs in primary and secondary forest and forest edge on vegetation near waterbodies. Breeding is explosive and takes place in both temporary and permanent ponds. The egg clutches float on the water.

Trachycephalus mesophaeus is an abundant species that can be threatened by clear cutting and water pollution.
