= Trachycephalus lepidus =

Conservation status
- Data Deficient (IUCN 3.1)

Scientific classification
- Kingdom: Animalia
- Phylum: Chordata
- Class: Amphibia
- Order: Anura
- Family: Hylidae
- Genus: Trachycephalus
- Species: T. lepidus

Binomial name
- Trachycephalus lepidus (Pombal, Haddad & Cruz, 2003)

Species of amphibian

Trachycephalus lepidus is a species of frogs in the family Hylidae endemic to Brazil. Its natural habitat is subtropical or tropical moist lowland forests. It is threatened by habitat loss. This species was previously within the genus Phrynohyas, which was recently synonymized with Trachycephalus.
