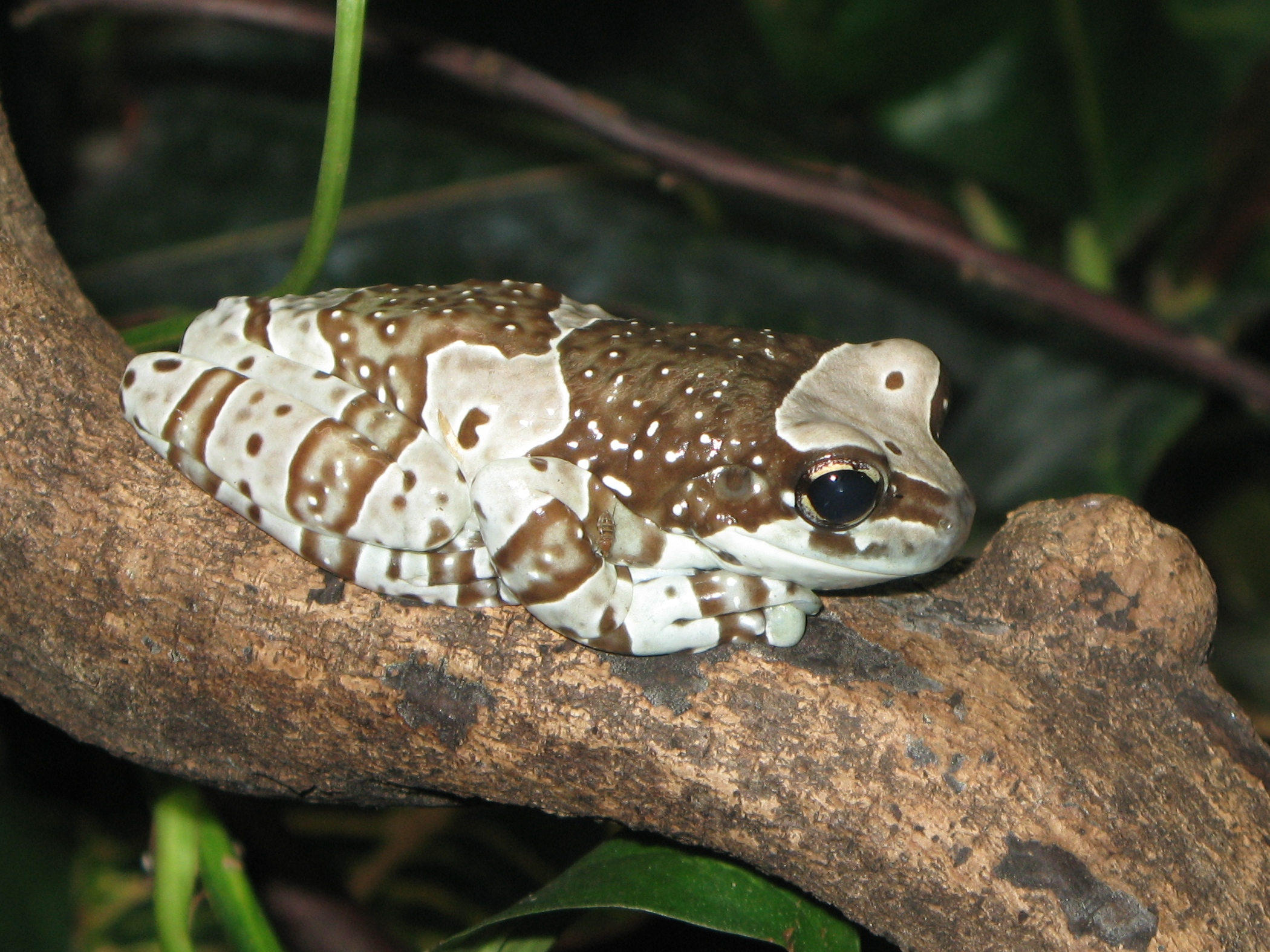
- Adult

Conservation status
- Least Concern (IUCN 3.1)

Scientific classification
- Kingdom: Animalia
- Phylum: Chordata
- Class: Amphibia
- Order: Anura
- Family: Hylidae
- Genus: Trachycephalus
- Species: T. resinifictrix

Binomial name
- Trachycephalus resinifictrix (Goeldi, 1907)

Synonyms
- Phrynohyas resinifictrix

= Mission golden-eyed tree frog =

Species of amphibian

The Mission golden-eyed tree frog or Amazon milk frog (Trachycephalus resinifictrix) is a large species of arboreal frog native to the Amazon rainforest in South America. It is sometimes referred to as the blue milk frog due to a sticky, milk-like substance that they produce when feeling threatened. It was first discovered along the Maracanã River in Brazil. This species was previously within the genus Phrynohyas, which was recently synonymized with Trachycephalus.

== Description ==
These frogs are fairly large, reaching sizes of 2.5 to 4.0 in (6.4 to 10.2 cm) in length. Adult frogs are light grey in colour with brown or black banding, while juveniles will exhibit stronger contrasts. As they age, their skin develops a slightly bumpy texture. Their blood tends to be a shade of blue which can be shown through their skin, most boldly in the mouth area and toe pads.

The "milk" in the common name comes from the milky fluid these frogs excrete when stressed.

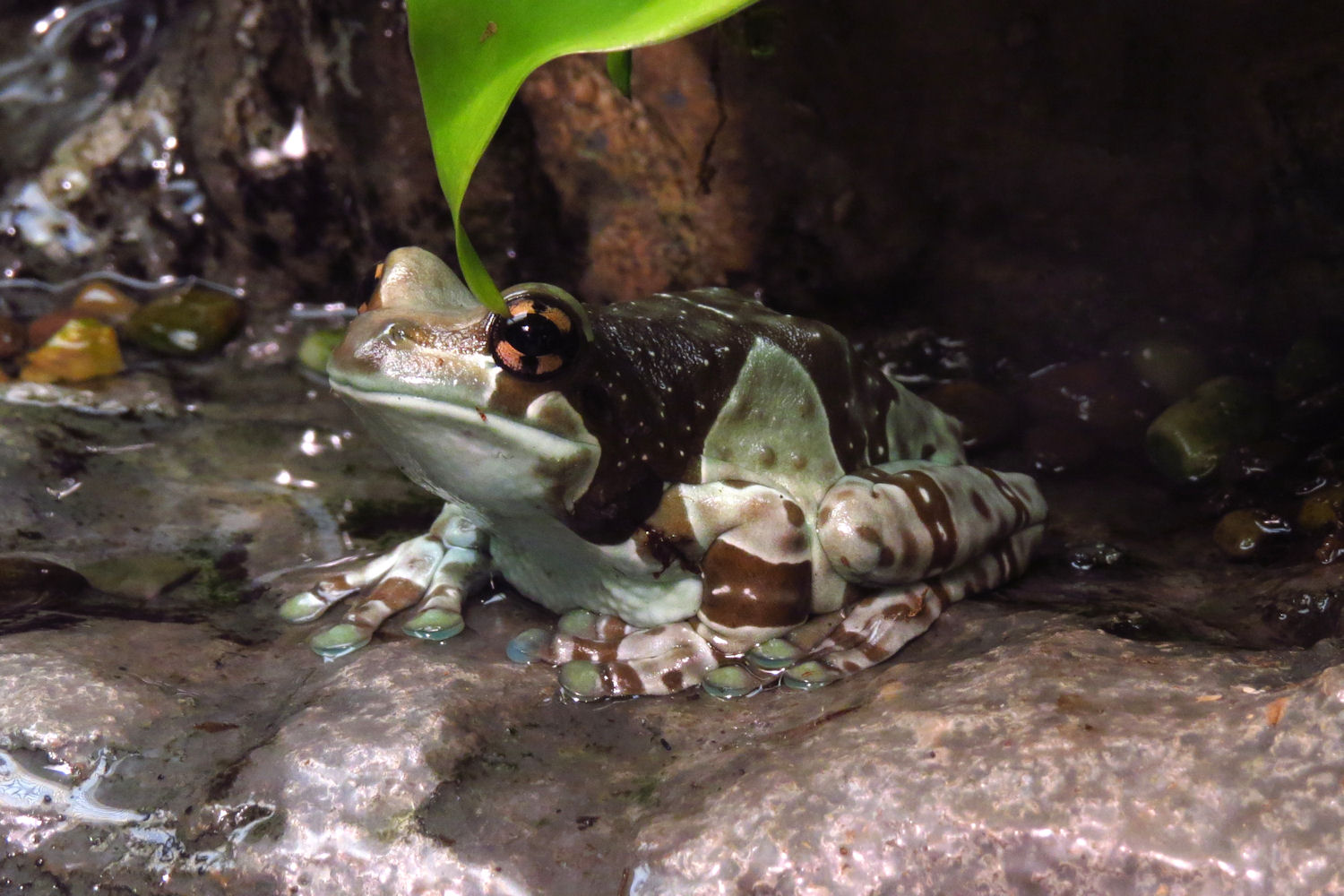
Adult

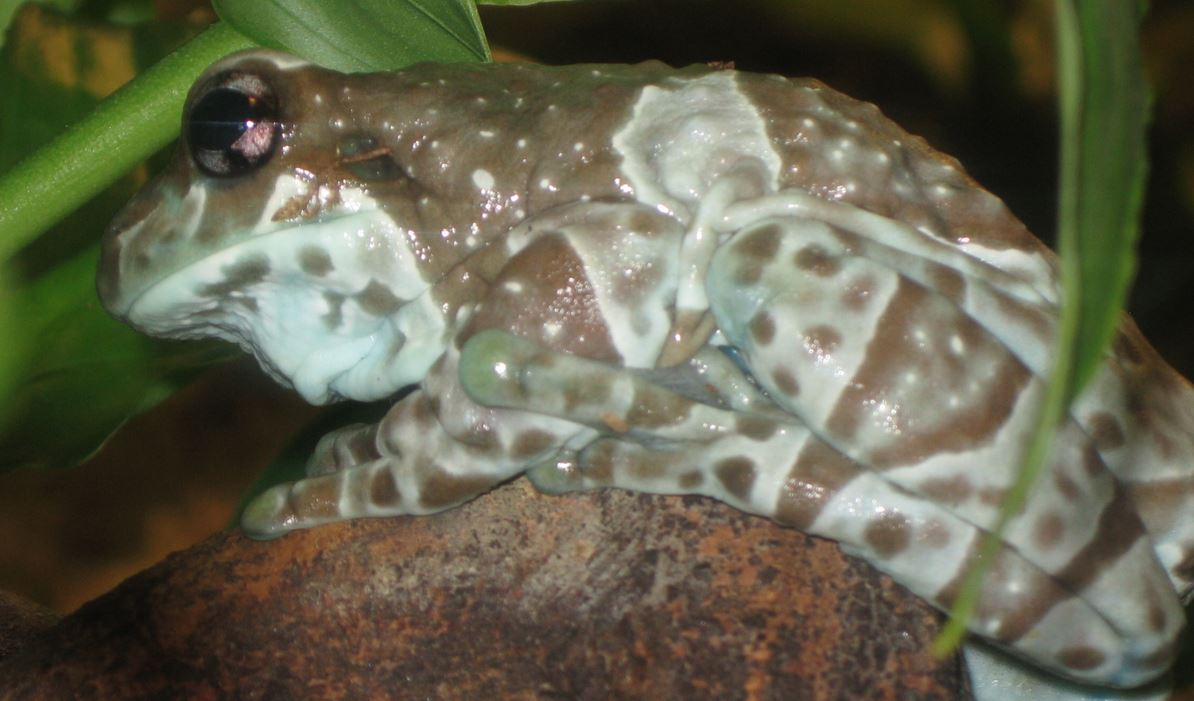
Amazon milk frog – Trachycephalus resinifictrix

== Habitat ==
Mission golden-eyed tree frogs are found in the tropical rain forests of South America. Populations are widespread in Guyana, Colombia, Brazil, Ecuador and Peru. They often inhabit vegetation which extends over permanent, slow-moving water sources.

== In captivity ==
Trachycephalus resinifictrix is commonly found in captivity. They are relatively easy to care for, but require a significant amount of space, humidity, and regular enclosure maintenance to ensure a clean healthy environment for the frog. In the wild, they live in temperatures around 21–30 °C (70–86 °F), and thus in captivity prefer a similar ambient temperature. These frogs are completely carnivorous and thrive on a diet of insects in captivity.
