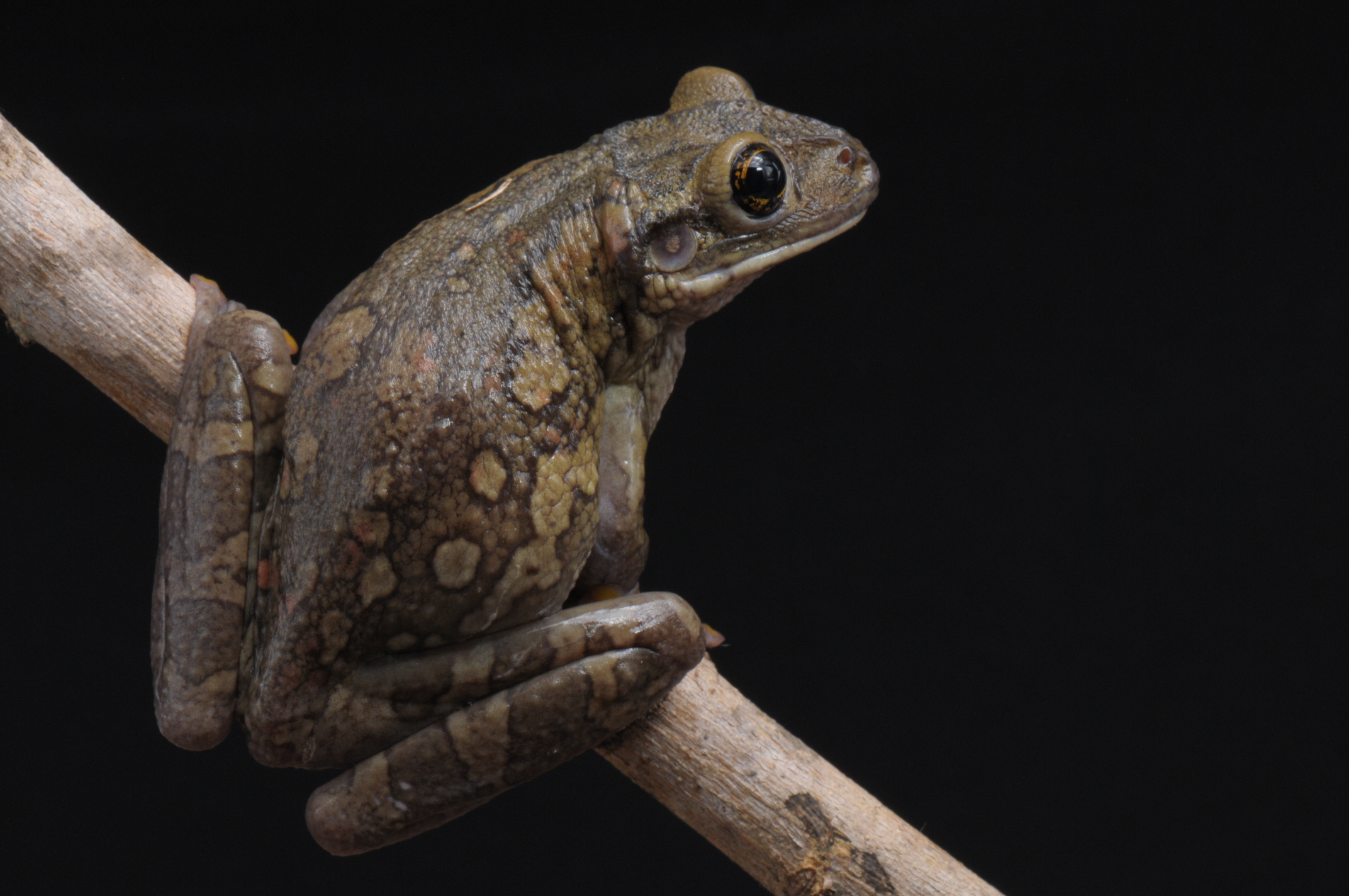

Conservation status
- Least Concern (IUCN 3.1)

Scientific classification
- Kingdom: Animalia
- Phylum: Chordata
- Class: Amphibia
- Order: Anura
- Family: Hylidae
- Genus: Trachycephalus
- Species: T. nigromaculatus

Binomial name
- Trachycephalus nigromaculatus Tschudi, 1838

= Black-spotted casque-headed tree frog =

Species of amphibian

The black-spotted casque-headed tree frog (Trachycephalus nigromaculatus) is a species of frog in the family Hylidae endemic to Brazil. Its natural habitats are lowland forest and restinga shrublands along the coast in coastal southeastern Brazil. It is threatened by habitat loss.

== Description ==
The species is a large treefrog, reaching snout–vent lengths of 92 mm (3.6 in). Its most distinctive feature is the small red spots along its back.

== Distribution ==
The black-spotted casque-headed tree frog is native to coastal southeastern Brazil, where it has been recorded from the states of Alagoas, Bahia, Espirito Santo, Goiás, Piauí, Minas Gerais, Paraíba, Pernambuco, and Rio de Janeiro. As it spends most of its time in the canopy of trees, its range is likely underestimated, at least in Bahia state. It inhabits the caatinga, cerrado, and Atlantic Forest ecoregions within its range, preferring lowland forest and restinga shrublands along the coast. It has also been found in cabruca, cacao plantations in the Atlantic Forest where some old-growth rainforest trees are retained to provide shade to the cacao. The species is somewhat tolerant of habitat degradation and inhabits elevations as high as 870 m (2,850 ft). It is generally seen inside the cores of bromelid plants or in tree holes, as well as alongside ponds or on branches.

== Biology ==
Breeding has been recorded in December and may also happen in February. It lays eggs in shallow pools, both temporary and permanent, as well as ponds and lakes. Males reach sexual maturity at around two years of age, while females reach sexual maturity at 3 years. The one-year delay between sexes may allow females to spend more energy on producing more eggs. Black-spotted casque-headed tree frogs have a dramatically lower growth rate following sexual maturity, a pattern known for many Neotropical frogs. The species is known to live to an age of at least six years.

=== Interactions with other species ===
The diet of black-spotted casque-headed tree frogs has not been recorded, but other closely-related species feed on invertebrates and small lizards, bats, and frogs. The black-spotted casque-headed tree frog is parasitized by the platyhelminth Polystoma knoffi (which was first discovered as a parasite of this species), the nematode Parapharyngodon aff. alvarengai, the annelid Dero (Allodero) lutzi. The ocellated treefrog is known to prey on the black-spotted casque-headed tree frog.

== Conservation ==
The black-spotted casque-headed tree frog is classified as being of least concern on the IUCN Red List due to its large range, stable population, and ability to tolerate at least slightly degraded habitats. Human activities such as logging, farming, overgrazing, and the deliberate setting of fires pose a minor threat to the species in part of its range. It is known from several protected areas.
