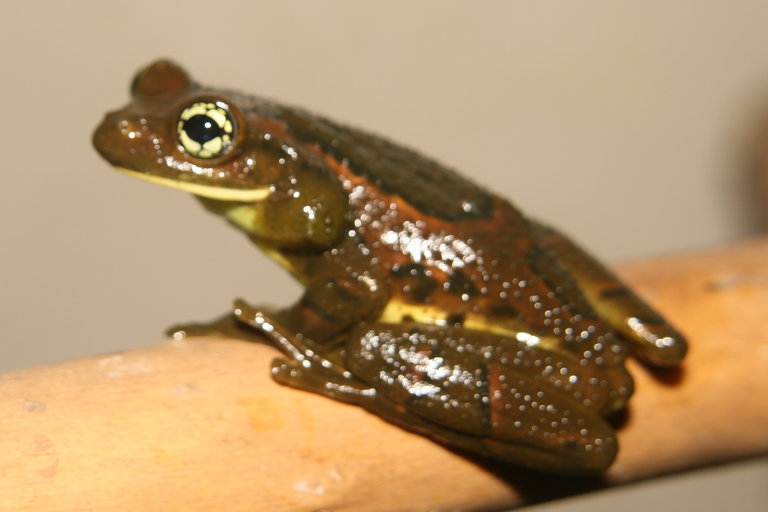

Conservation status
- Least Concern (IUCN 3.1)

Scientific classification
- Kingdom: Animalia
- Phylum: Chordata
- Class: Amphibia
- Order: Anura
- Family: Hylidae
- Genus: Trachycephalus
- Species: T. imitatrix

Binomial name
- Trachycephalus imitatrix (Miranda-Ribeiro, 1926)

= Rio golden-eyed tree frog =

Species of amphibian

The Rio golden-eyed tree frog (Trachycephalus imitatrix) is a species of frog in the family Hylidae found in Argentina and Brazil. Its natural habitats are subtropical or tropical moist lowland forests, subtropical or tropical moist montane forests, and freshwater marshes. It is threatened by habitat loss.
