= Ornate frog =

Ornate frog may refer to:

- Ornate burrowing frog (Platyplectrum ornatum), a ground frog in the family Myobatrachidae native to Australia
- Ornate chorus frog (Pseudacris ornata), a chorus frog in the family Hylidae endemic to the Southeastern United States
- Ornate narrow-mouthed frog (Microhyla ornata), a frog in the family Microhylidae found in South Asia
- Ornate tree frog (Hypsiboas ornatissimus), a frog in the family Hylidae found in Brazil, Colombia, French Guiana, Guyana, Suriname, and Venezuela
- Common ornate frog (Hildebrandtia ornata), a frog in the genus Hildebrandtia
