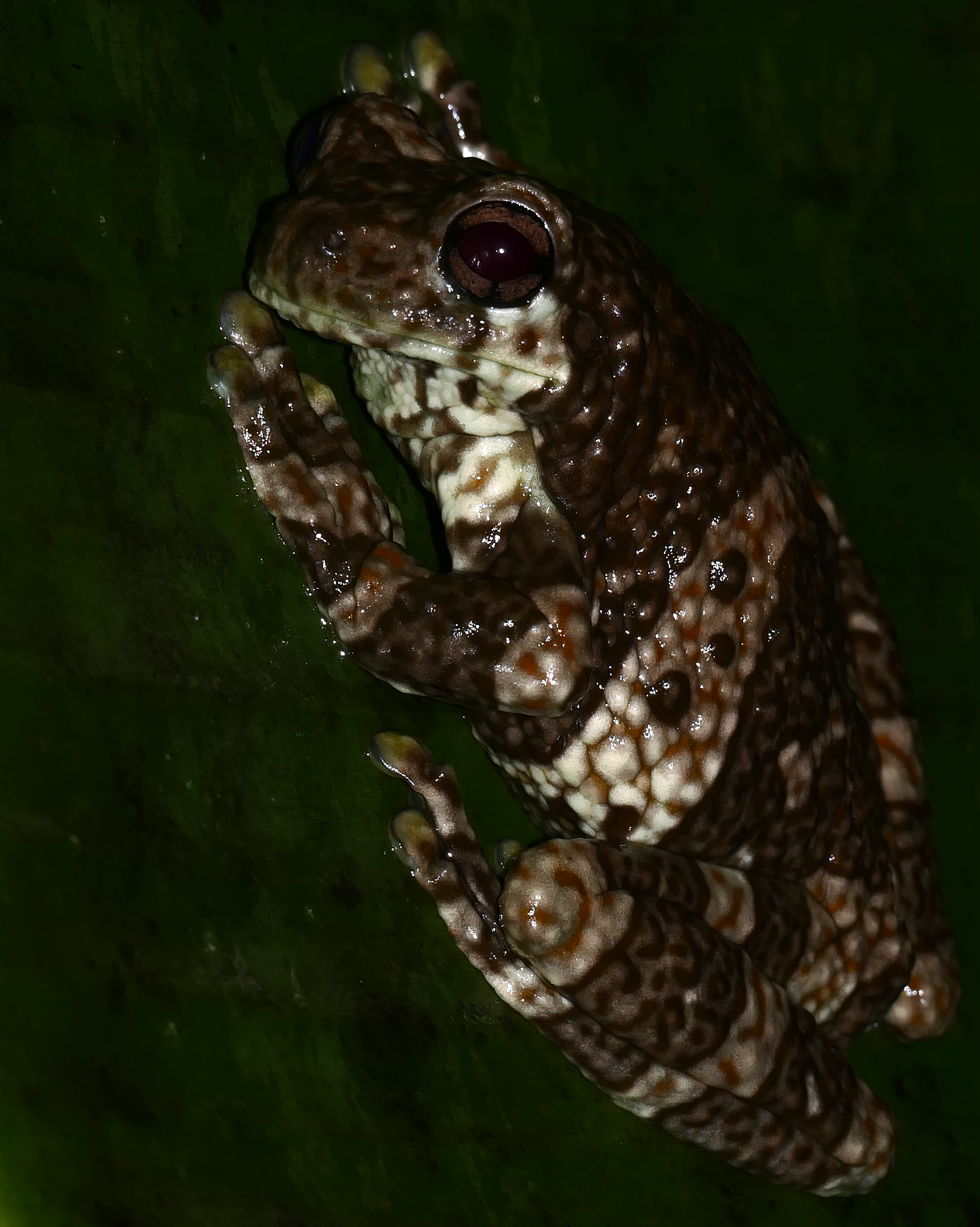

Conservation status
- Least Concern (IUCN 3.1)

Scientific classification
- Kingdom: Animalia
- Phylum: Chordata
- Class: Amphibia
- Order: Anura
- Family: Hylidae
- Genus: Trachycephalus
- Species: T. hadroceps

Binomial name
- Trachycephalus hadroceps (Duellman & Hoogmoed, 1992)

= New River tree frog =

Species of amphibian

The New River tree frog (Trachycephalus hadroceps) is a species of frog in the family Hylidae found in French Guiana, Guyana, Suriname, and possibly Brazil. Its natural habitat is subtropical or tropical moist lowland forests.

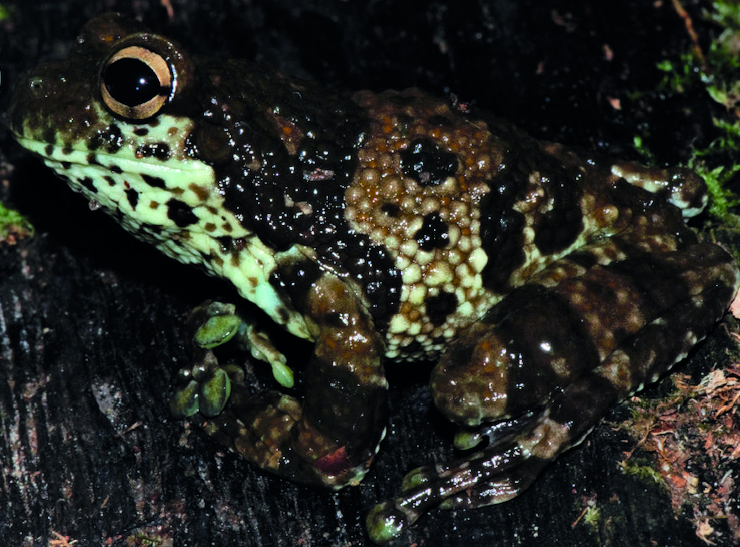
Amapá, Brazil
