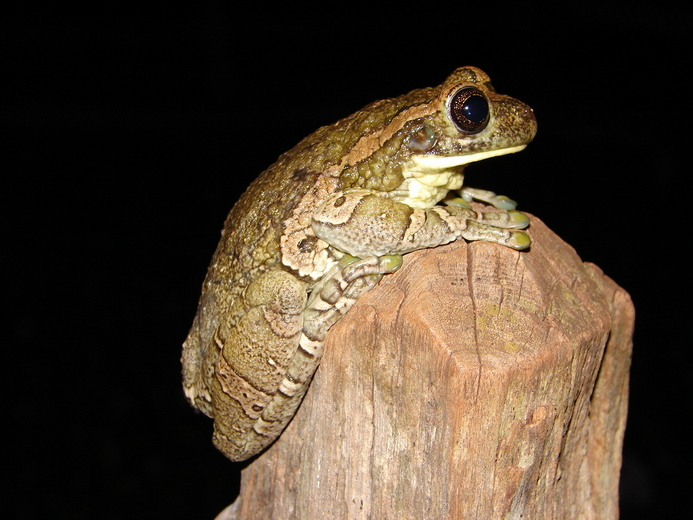

Conservation status
- Least Concern (IUCN 3.1)

Scientific classification
- Kingdom: Animalia
- Phylum: Chordata
- Class: Amphibia
- Order: Anura
- Family: Hylidae
- Genus: Trachycephalus
- Species: T. typhonius

Binomial name
- Trachycephalus typhonius (Laurenti, 1768)

Synonyms
- Argenteohyla altamazonica Henle, 1981; Hyla adenoderma B. Lutz, 1968; Hyla macrotis Andersson, 1945; Hyla tibiatrix Laurenti, 1768; Hyla zonata Spix, 1824; Phrynohyas corasterias Shannon & Humphrey, 1957; Phrynohyas ingens Duellman, 1956; Phrynohyas latifasciata Duellman, 1956; Rana venulosa Laurenti, 1768

= Veined tree frog =

Species of amphibian

The veined tree frog (Trachycephalus typhonius), or common milk frog, is a species of frog in the family Hylidae.

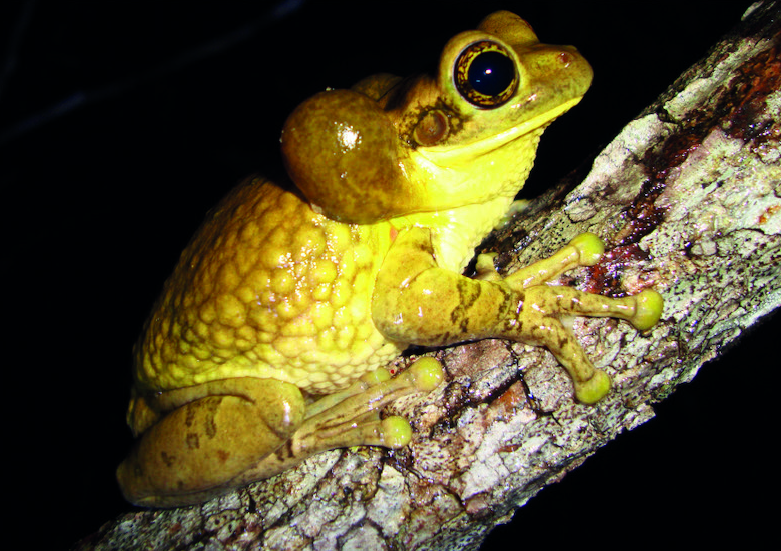
Amapá, Brazil

This species was previously within the genus Phrynohyas, which was recently synonymized with Trachycephalus. It is found in Central and South America. Its natural habitats are subtropical or tropical dry forest, subtropical or tropical moist lowland forest, subtropical or tropical moist shrubland, subtropical or tropical dry lowland grassland, rivers, intermittent rivers, freshwater lakes, freshwater marshes, intermittent freshwater marshes, arable land, pastureland, plantations, rural gardens, urban areas, heavily degraded former forest, water storage areas, and ponds. The veined tree frog is nocturnal, and can typically be found in tree branches and in areas with large amounts of vegetation. This frog is one of several other tree frogs in the family Hylidae that secrete a toxic substance from their skin that produces extreme irritation and pain when in contact with mucosal membrane surfaces.

The veined tree frog has been observed being eaten by a mantis.
